= List of Mexican Revolution and Cristero War films =

Below is an incomplete list of feature films, television films or television series which include events of the Mexican Revolution and Cristero War. This list does not include documentaries, short films.

== 1910s ==
Year	Country	Main title (Alternative title)	Original title (Original script)	Director	Subject
1914	United States	The Life of General Villa		Christy Cabanne	Action, Adventure, Biography, Drama. Pancho Villa

== 1920s ==
Year	Country	Main title (Alternative title)	Original title (Original script)	Director	Subject
1923	United States	The Broken Wing		Tom Forman	Comedy, Drama. Based on the play The Broken Wing.
1928	United Kingdom	Adventurous Youth		Edward Godal	Adventure, Drama, War, Western.

== 1930s ==
Year	Country	Main title (Alternative title)	Original title (Original script)	Director	Subject
1932	United States; Mexico	Long Live Mexico!	¡Que viva México! Да здравствует Мексика!	Sergei Eisenstein; Grigori Aleksandrov	History.
1933	Mexico; United States	Thunder Over Mexico		Sergei Eisenstein	Drama, History.
1933	Mexico	Prisoner 13	El prisionero trece	Fernando de Fuentes	Drama, War.
1933	Mexico	Revolution	Revolución	Miguel Contreras Torres	Drama, Adventure, War.
1934	Mexico	Godfather Mendoza	El compadre Mendoza	Fernando de Fuentes	Drama, War. Based on an unknown story.
1934	United States	Viva Villa!		Jack Conway; Howard Hawks; William A. Wellman	Western. Pancho Villa
1936	Mexico	Beautiful Sky	Cielito lindo	Robert Quigley; Roberto Gavaldón	Musical, Comedy, Drama.
1936	Mexico	Let's Go with Pancho Villa	Vámonos con Pancho Villa	Fernando de Fuentes	Drama, War. Based on a novel Vámonos con Pancho Villa. Pancho Villa
1937	Mexico	Rebel Souls	Almas rebeldes	Alejandro Galindo	Adventure, Western. La Adelita
1937	Mexico	Such Is My Country	¡Así es mi tierra!	Arcady Boytler	Drama, Comedy.
1937	United States	Under Strange Flags		Irvin Willat	Romance.
1938	Mexico		La Adelita	Guillermo Hernández Gómez; Mario de Lara	Drama, War. La Adelita
1938	Mexico	La Valentina		Martín de Lucenay	Comedy, Drama, Musical, War.
1939	Mexico	With Villa's Veterans	Con los Dorados de Villa	Raúl de Anda	Drama, War.

== 1940s ==
Year	Country	Main title (Alternative title)	Original title (Original script)	Director	Subject
1940	Mexico	Those below	Los de abajo	Chano Urueta	Drama, War. Based on a novel The Underdogs.
1941	Mexico	Jalisco, don't back down	¡Ay, Jalisco, no te rajes!	Joselito Rodríguez	Comedy, Drama, Musical. Based on a novel ¡Ay, Jalisco...no te rajes! o la guerra santa.
1942	Mexico	The Eternal Secret	Secreto eterno	Carlos Orellana	Drama.
1942	Mexico; Argentina; Spain	Passion Island	La isla de la pasión	Emilio Fernández	Drama.
1943	Mexico	The machine gun	El Ametralladora	Jaime L. Robles	Drama.
1943	Mexico	Wild Flower	Flor silvestre	Emilio Fernández	Drama, Romance, War.
1944	Mexico	The Legend of a Bandit	La leyenda del bandido	Fernando Méndez	Western, Adventure, Drama.
1945	Mexico	The aviary	La pajarera	Emilio Gómez Muriel	Drama, War.
1945	Mexico	Between brothers	Entre hermanos	Ramón Peón	Drama, War.
1945	Mexico	The Abandoned	Las Abandonadas	Emilio Fernández	Drama, Romance, War.
1946	Mexico	When the brave cry	Cuando lloran los valientes	Ismael Rodríguez	Drama, Romance.
1946	Mexico	Here is Juan Colorado	Aquí está Juan Colorado	Rolando Aguilar	Drama, War, Western.
1946	Mexico	Enamoured	Enamorada	Emilio Fernández	Drama, Romance, War.
1947	Mexico	The red house	La casa colorada	Miguel Morayta	Action, Drama, War.
1948	Mexico	The fox's grandson	El nieto del zorro	Jaime Salvador	Comedy.
1948	Mexico	If Adelita went with another	Si Adelita se fuera con otro	Chano Urueta	Action, Adventure, Drama, War.
1948	Mexico		Rosenda	Julio Bracho	Drama, Romance, War.
1949	Mexico	Witch corner	Rincón brujo	Alberto Gout	Drama.

== 1950s ==
Year	Country	Main title (Alternative title)	Original title (Original script)	Director	Subject
1950	Mexico	One Day of Life	Un día de vida	Emilio Fernández	Drama, Romance, War.
1950	Mexico	The whirlpool came and lifted us up	Vino el remolino y nos alevantó	Juan Bustillo Oro	Drama, War.
1950	Mexico	Duel in the mountains	Duelo en las montañas	Emilio Fernández	Drama, Romance, War.
1950	Mexico	The black Angustias	La negra Angustias	Matilde Landeta	Drama, War. La Adelita
1950	United States; Mexico	The Torch	Del odio nace el amor	Emilio Fernández	Action, Adventure, Comedy, Drama, Romance, War. Based on a comedy The Taming of the Shrew.
1950	Mexico	Pancho Villa returns	Vuelve Pancho Villa	Miguel Contreras Torres	Adventure, Drama, Romance, War.
1950	Mexico	Pancho Villa Returns		Miguel Contreras Torres	Western.
1951	Mexico	Sentenced to death	Sentenciado a muerte	Víctor Urruchúa	Drama.
1951	Mexico	Rural captain	Capitán de rurales	Alejandro Galindo	Drama, War.
1951	Mexico	My General's Women	Las mujeres de mi general	Ismael Rodríguez	Drama, War.
1952	United States	The Fighter		Herbert Kline	Drama, Sport. Based on a short story The Mexican.
1952	United States; Mexico	Viva Zapata!		Elia Kazan	Biography, Drama, History, Western. Based on the book Zapata the Unconquerable. Emiliano Zapata
1953	United States	Wings of the Hawk		Budd Boetticher	Adventure, Romance, Western.
1955	Mexico	The 7 leagues	El 7 leguas	Raúl de Anda	Adventure, Drama, Western.
1955	Mexico; Spain	Three love melodies	Tres melodías de amor	Alejandro Galindo	Drama, Romance.
1955	Mexico	The Criminal Life of Archibaldo de la Cruz	Ensayo de un crimen	Luis Buñuel	Comedy, Crime, Drama.
1955	United States	The Treasure of Pancho Villa		George Sherman	Romance, War, Western.
1955	Soviet Union	The Mexican	Мексиканец	Vladimir Kaplunovsky	Drama. Based on a short story The Mexican.
1956	Mexico	The Hidden One	La escondida	Roberto Gavaldón	Adventure, Drama, War, Western. Based on a novel La escondida.
1956	United States	Bandido		Richard Fleischer	Action, Adventure, Drama, War, Western.
1957	Mexico	Sweetheart!	¡Cielito lindo!	Miguel M. Delgado	Musical, Drama.
1957	Mexico	This was Pancho Villa	Así era Pancho Villa	Ismael Rodríguez	Action, Adventure, Drama, War. Pancho Villa
1957	Mexico	land of men	Tierra de hombres	Ismael Rodríguez	Action, Drama, History, War.
1957	Mexico	Pancho Villa's treasure	El tesoro de Pancho Villa	Rafael Baledón	Adventure, Action, Drama, War.
1958	United States	Villa!!		James B. Clark	Adventure, Western. Pancho Villa
1958	Mexico	The three pelonas	Las tres pelonas	René Cardona	Comedy, Drama, Music, War.
1959	Mexico	The Soldiers of Pancho Villa	La Cucaracha	Ismael Rodríguez	Drama, Romance, War. La Adelita
1959	United States	They Came to Cordura		Robert Rossen	Adventure, Drama, History, War, Western. Based on a novel They Came to Cordura. Pancho Villa Expedition
1959	Mexico	Café Colón		Benito Alazraki	Drama, Adventure, Romance, War.
1959	Mexico	People in arms	Pueblo en armas	Miguel Contreras Torres	Drama, Adventure, War. Based on a novel Viva la Soldadera.
1959	Mexico	The colonels	Las coronelas	Rafael Baledón	Comedy, Adventure, War.

== 1960s ==
Year	Country	Main title (Alternative title)	Original title (Original script)	Director	Subject
1960	Mexico	Long live the soldier!	¡Viva la soldadera!	Miguel Contreras Torres	Drama, Adventure, Action, War. Based on a novel Viva la Soldadera.
1960	Mexico	When Viva Villa..! it's death	Cuando ¡Viva Villa..! es la muerte	Ismael Rodríguez	Action, Drama, History, War. Pancho Villa
1960	Mexico	Pancho Villa and Valentina	Pancho Villa y la Valentina	Ismael Rodríguez	War, Action, Adventure, Drama. Pancho Villa
1960	Mexico	Impatient Heart	Impaciencia del corazón	Tito Davison	Drama, Romance, War.
1960	Spain; West Germany; Argentina	Juanito		Fernando Palacios	Adventure, Western.
1961	Mexico	Juana Gallo		Miguel Zacarías	War, Drama. La Adelita
1962	Mexico	The Centaur of the North	El centauro del norte	Ramón Pereda	Western, Drama. La Adelita
1962	Mexico	The Ajusco Turtle Dove	La tórtola del Ajusco	Juan Orol	Drama, Romance, War.
1962	Mexico	Sun on fire	Sol en llamas	Alfredo B. Crevenna	Adventure, War, Drama.
1963	Mexico	La Bandida		Roberto Rodríguez	Drama, Musical, Romance, War.
1964	Mexico	María Pistolas' corrido	El corrido de María Pistolas	René Cardona; Tito Novaro	Adventure, Drama, War, Western.
1964	Mexico	The Death Brothers	Los hermanos Muerte	Rafael Baledón	Action, Drama, War.
1966	Mexico		¡Viva Benito Canales!	Miguel M. Delgado	Action, Adventure, Drama, War.
1966	Mexico	The Bay Horse	El caballo bayo	Tito Novaro; René Cardona	Drama, Western.
1966	Mexico	The four Juanes	Los cuatro Juanes	Miguel Zacarías	Adventure, Western, Action, Comedy.
1966	Italy	A Bullet for the General	Quién sabe?	Damiano Damiani	Action, Western.
1966	United States	The Professionals		Richard Brooks	Action, Adventure, Drama, Western. Based on a novel A Mule for the Marquesa.
1966	Mexico	La Valentina		Rogelio A. González	Adventure, Comedy, Drama, Romance, War. Based on the corrido La Valentina.
1967	Mexico	The centaur Pancho Villa	El centauro Pancho Villa	Alfonso Corona Blake	Drama, Action, War. Pancho Villa
1967	Mexico	A Faithful Soldier of Pancho Villa	Un dorado de Pancho Villa	Emilio Fernández	Adventure, Drama, War.
1967	Mexico	The Female Soldier	La soldadera	José Bolaños	Action, Drama, War.
1967	Italy	Killer Kid		Leopoldo Savona	Drama, Romance, Western.
1967	Mexico	My rebellious tight horse	Mi caballo prieto rebelde	Arturo Martínez	Action, Adventure, Drama, War, Western. Pancho Villa
1967	Spain; United States	The Vengeance of Pancho Villa	Los 7 de Pancho Villa	José María Elorrieta	Drama, Western. Pancho Villa
1967	Spain; Italy	Dakota Joe	Un hombre y un Colt	Tulio Demicheli	Western.
1967	Mexico	The Partisan of Villa	La guerrillera de Villa	Miguel Morayta	Comedy, Drama, Romance, War. La Adelita
1968	Mexico		Lucio Vázquez	René Cardona; Tito Novaro	War, Western, Adventure, Drama.
1968	Mexico	The leader	El caudillo	Alberto Mariscal	Drama, Action, War.
1968	Mexico	Valentín de la Sierra		René Cardona	Action, Adventure, Drama, Romance, War. Based on the corrido Valentín de la Sierra.
1968	Italy; Spain	Train for Durango	Un treno per Durango	Mario Caiano	Western, Comedy.
1968	Mexico	Dark jet horse	Caballo prieto azabache	René Cardona	Adventure, Drama, War.
1968	Italy; Spain; United States	The Mercenary	Il mercenario	Sergio Corbucci	Comedy, Western.
1968	Italy; France	Run, Man, Run	Corri uomo corri	Sergio Sollima	Adventure, Comedy, Western.
1968	United States	Villa Rides		Buzz Kulik	Drama, War, Western. Pancho Villa
1969	United States	The Wild Bunch		Sam Peckinpah	Action, Adventure, Drama, Western.
1969	Italy; Spain	Tepepa		Giulio Petroni	Action, Adventure, Drama, Western.
1969	Mexico	The Glass Eye	El ojo de vidrio	René Cardona Jr.	Action, Adventure, Comedy, Drama, War.
1969	Mexico	Lauro Daggers	Lauro Puñales	René Cardona	Adventure, Drama, War.
1969	Italy	The Five Man Army	Un esercito di 5 uomini	Don Taylor; Dario Argento	Action, Adventure, Western.
1969	United States	100 Rifles		Tom Gries	Adventure, Drama, War, Western. Based on a novel The Californio.
1969	United States	Guns of the Magnificent Seven		Paul Wendkos	Action, Drama, Western.
1969	Italy; Spain	Viva Cangaceiro	O' Cangaçeiro	Giovanni Fago	Drama, Western.
1969	Mexico	The trench	La trinchera	Carlos Enrique Taboada	Action, Drama, War.

== 1970s ==
Year	Country	Main title (Alternative title)	Original title (Original script)	Director	Subject
1970	United States	Cannon for Cordoba		Paul Wendkos	Action, Romance, Western.
1970	Italy; Spain; West Germany	Companions	Compañeros	Sergio Corbucci	Action, Comedy, Western.
1970	Mexico	Emiliano Zapata		Felipe Cazals	Action, Biography, Drama, History, War.
1970	Mexico	The Glass Eye Returns	Vuelve el ojo de vidrio	René Cardona Jr.	Action, Adventure, Comedy, Drama, History, War.
1970	Mexico	At the general	La generala	Juan Ibáñez	Thriller, War, Drama.
1971	Italy; Spain	The long day of violence	Il lungo giorno della violenza	Giuseppe Maria Scotese	Western.
1971	Mexico	The Charred	La chamuscada	Alberto Mariscal	Action, Drama, War.
1971	United Kingdom; Spain	A Town Called Bastard		Robert Parrish	Action, Drama, Western.
1971	Italy; West Germany; Spain	Long Live Your Death	Viva la muerte... tua!	Duccio Tessari	Action, Adventure, Comedy, War, Western.
1971	Italy	Duck, You Sucker!	Giù la testa	Sergio Leone	Drama, War, Western.
1971	Italy; United States	Blindman	Il Pistolero Cieco	Ferdinando Baldi	Western.
1971	Italy; France; Spain	Bad Man's River	E continuavano a fregarsi il milione di dollari El hombre de Río Malo	Eugenio Martín	Comedy, Romance, Western.
1972	Mexico	Endless waltz	Vals sin fin	Rubén Broido	Biography, Drama, War. Ramón López Velarde
1972	Mexico	It happened in Jalisco	Sucedió en Jalisco	Raúl de Anda	Action, Adventure, Drama, War, Western. Based on a novel Sucedió en Jalisco.
1972	Italy; Spain	What Am I Doing in the Middle of a Revolution?	Che c'entriamo noi con la rivoluzione?	Sergio Corbucci	Comedy, Western, Adventure.
1972	United Kingdom; Spain; United States	Pancho Villa		Eugenio Martín	Action, Biography, Comedy, Drama, Western. Pancho Villa
1973	Mexico	The beginning	El principio	Gonzalo Martínez Ortega	Action, Drama, History, Romance, War.
1973	Mexico	Valente Quintero		Mario Hernández	Adventure, Drama, Western. Based on the corrido Valente Quintero. Valente Quintero
1973	Mexico	Reed: Insurgent Mexico	Reed, México insurgente	Paul Leduc	Biography, Drama, War. Based on a novel México insurgente: la revolución de 1910.
1974	Mexico	The death of Pancho Villa	La muerte de Pancho Villa	Mario Hernández	Action, Biography, Drama, History, War. Pancho Villa
1975	Mexico	The Living Forces	Las fuerzas vivas	Luis Alcoriza	Action, Comedy, Drama, War.
1975	Mexico		Simón Blanco	Mario Hernández	Action, Drama, Romance, War.
1976	Mexico	Law of the hill	La ley del monte	Alberto Mariscal	Action, Drama, Romance, War. Based on a novel El niño de la bola.
1977	East Germany		Trini	Walter Beck	History, War, Western. Based on a novel Trini.
1977	Mexico	Quarter	Cuartelazo	Alberto Isaac	Action, Drama, History, War. Ten Tragic Days
1977	Mexico	The Divine Caste	La casta divina	Julián Pastor	Drama, History, War. Salvador Alvarado
1978	Mexico	Paloma's nights	Las noches de Paloma	Alberto Isaac	Comedy.
1978	Mexico	Death in Cold Blood	Muerte a sangre fría	Gilberto Gazcón de Anda	Adventure, Crime, Drama, War, Western.
1978	Mexico	Those below	Los de abajo	Servando González	Action, Adventure, Drama, History, War. Based on a novel The Underdogs.
1979	United States	She Came to the Valley		Albert Band	Action, Adventure, Drama, Western. Based on a novel She Came to the Valley.
1979	Mexico	Benjamín Argumedo the rebel	Benjamín Argumedo el rebelde	Mario Hernández	Western. Benjamín Argumedo

== 1980s ==
Year	Country	Main title (Alternative title)	Original title (Original script)	Director	Subject
1980	Mexico	Persecution and death of Benjamín Argumedo	Persecución y muerte de Benjamín Argumedo	Mario Hernández	Drama, Western. Benjamín Argumedo
1982	Mexico	The devil in person	El diablo en persona	Edgardo Gazcón	Comedy, Drama, Romance, War.
1982	Mexico; Soviet Union; Italy	Red Bells	Красные колокола. Фильм 1. Мексика в огне Messico in fiamme Campanas rojas	Sergei Bondarchuk	Drama, Western. John Reed
1983	Mexico	Guerilla from the North	El guerrillero del norte	Francisco Guerrero	Action, Drama, War.
1987	Mexico	Zapata in Chinameca	Zapata en Chinameca	Mario Hernández	Action, History.
1987	Mexico	La Coyota		Luis Quintanilla Rico	Action, Drama, War.
1988	Mexico	The rail	La rielera	Raúl Fernández	Action.
1989	Mexico	Rosendo Fierro: Villa's email	Rosendo Fierro: El correo de Villa	Tito Novaro; Roberto Sala Blanco	Action, Biography, Drama, History, War.
1989	United States; Mexico	Old Gringo		Luis Puenzo	Adventure, History, Romance. Based on a novel The Old Gringo.

== 1990s ==
Year	Country	Main title (Alternative title)	Original title (Original script)	Director	Subject
1992	Mexico	Like Water for Chocolate	Como agua para chocolate	Alfonso Arau	Drama, Romance. Based on a novel Like Water for Chocolate.
1995	United States; Mexico	Land of Darkness		Adrian Rudomin	Drama.
1999	Mexico; France; Spain	The Comet	El cometa	José Buil; Marisa Sistach Peret	Musical, Adventure, Drama.

== 2000s ==
Year	Country	Main title (Alternative title)	Original title (Original script)	Director	Subject
2000	Mexico	Bedtime Fairy Tales for Crocodiles	Cuentos de hadas para dormir cocodrilos	Ignacio Ortiz Cruz	Drama.

== 2010s ==
Year	Country	Main title (Alternative title)	Original title (Original script)	Director	Subject
2010	Mexico	Marcellin, bread and wine	Marcelino, pan y vino	José Luis Gutiérrez Arias	Drama, Family. Based on a novel Marcelino, pan y vino.
2010	Mexico	Big boy	Chico grande	Felipe Cazals	Drama, History, War, Western. Based on an unknown text.
2011	Mexico	The zebra	La cebra	Fernando Javier León Rodríguez	Action, Adventure, Comedy, Drama.
2012	Mexico	The walls speak	Las paredes hablan	Antonio Zavala Kugler	Drama, History.
2013	Mexico	Citizen Buelna	Ciudadano Buelna	Felipe Cazals	Drama, History. Rafael Buelna
2013	Mexico; Denmark	Killing Strangers	Matar extraños	Nicolás Pereda; Jacob Secher Schulsinger	

== Science fiction, fantasy, and horror films ==
Year	Country	Main title (Alternative title)	Original title (Original script)	Director	Subject
1967	Mexico	Pedro Páramo		Carlos Velo	Drama, Fantasy, Horror, Mystery, Romance, War. Based on a novel Pedro Páramo.
1968	Mexico	The scapular	El escapulario	Servando González	Crime, Drama, Fantasy, Horror, Mystery, War.
1968	Mexico	The door and the butcher's wife	La puerta y la mujer del carnicero	Luis Alcoriza; Ismael Rodríguez; Chano Urueta	Drama, Fantasy, Horror, Mystery.
1999	United States	From Dusk Till Dawn 3: The Hangman's Daughter		P. J. Pesce	Horror, Thriller, Western.
2004	Mexico	Zapata: The dream of a hero	Zapata: el sueño del héroe	Alfonso Arau	Biography, Drama, Fantasy, War. Emiliano Zapata

== Television films ==
Year	Country	Main title (Alternative title)	Original title (Original script)	Director	Subject
1972	United States	Hardcase		John Llewellyn Moxey	Western.
1976	United States	Wanted: The Sundance Woman		Lee Philips	Drama, Western.
1999	United States	The Adventures of Young Indiana Jones: Spring Break Adventure		Joe Johnston; Carl Schultz	Action, Adventure, History, War.
2003	United States; Mexico	And Starring Pancho Villa as Himself		Larry Gelbart	Biography, Drama, History, War, Western. Pancho Villa

== Television series ==
Year	Country	Main title (Alternative title)	Original title (Original script)	Director	Subject
1970	Mexico	The Constitution	La constitución	Raúl Araiza	Drama, History, War.
1987	Mexico	Path to Glory	Senda de gloria	Raúl Araiza	Biography, Drama, History, Romance, War.
2004	Mexico	Zapata: love in rebellion	Zapata: amor en rebeldía	Walter Doehner	Biography, Drama. Emiliano Zapata
2011	Mexico	The charm of the eagle	El encanto del águila	Mafer Suárez; Gerardo Tort	Biography.
2016-17	Mexico	Revolution - The Battles of Celaya	Revolución - Las Batallas de Celaya	Miguel Rico Tavera	History. Battle of Celaya
2023	Mexico	Pancho Villa: The Centaur of the North	Pancho Villa: El Centauro del Norte	Rafael Lara	Action, Adventure, Biography, Drama, War. Pancho Villa

== Cristero War ==
Year	Country	Main title (Alternative title)	Original title (Original script)	Director	Subject
1947	Mexico; United States	The Fugitive		John Ford	Drama, History. Based on a novel The Power and the Glory.
1947	Mexico	It Happened in Jalisco (The Cristeros)	Sucedió en Jalisco (Los cristeros)	Raúl de Anda	Drama, History, War. Based on a novel Sucedió en Jalisco o los Cristeros.
1949	Mexico	The charro del Cristo	El charro del Cristo	René Cardona	Drama.
1958	Mexico	Ash Wednesday	Miércoles de ceniza	Roberto Gavaldón	Drama, War.
1971	Mexico; United States	Rain for a Dusty Summer		Arthur Lubin	Drama, Western. Miguel Pro
1971	Mexico	The days of love	Los días del amor	Alberto Isaac	Drama, War.
1976	Mexico	Anyway, your name is Juan	De todos modos Juan te llamas	Marcela Fernandez Violante	Drama, Romance, War.
1979	Mexico	The holy war	La guerra santa	Carlos Enrique Taboada	Action, Drama, History, Thriller, War.
1980	Mexico	Lame Step	A paso de cojo	Luis Alcoriza	Action, Comedy, Crime, Drama, War.
2008	Mexico		Padre Pro	Miguel Rico	Drama. Miguel Pro
2008	Mexico	The Desert Within	Desierto Adentro	Rodrigo Plá	Drama.
2011	Mexico; Netherlands	The Last Christeros	Los Últimos Cristeros	Matías Meyer	Drama, Western. Based on a novel Rescoldo: los últimos cristeros.
2012	Mexico	For Greater Glory		Dean Wright	Drama, History, War, Western.
2023	Mexico		Mirando al Cielo	Antonio Peláez	Drama. José Sánchez del Río
2024	Mexico	Pedro Páramo		Rodrigo Prieto	Drama, Fantasy, Horror, Mystery, Romance, Western. Based on a novel Pedro Páramo.
