= List of Mexican films of 1970 =

A list of the films produced in Mexico in 1970 (see 1970 in film):

Title	Director	Cast	Genre	Notes
Alguien nos quiere matar	Carlos Velo	Angélica María, Carlos Bracho, Jorge Russek		
Un amante anda suelto	Rubén Galindo	Alberto Vázquez, Fernando Luján, Zulma Faiad		
Confesiones de una adolescente	Julián Soler	Hilda Aguirre, Jorge Rivero, Fernando Luján, Irma Lozano		
¿Porque nací mujer?	Rogelio A. González	Sara García, Pilar Pellicer, Prudencia Grifell		
Rosas blancas para mi hermana negra	Abel Salazar	Libertad Lamarque, Eusebia Cosme		
Las figuras de arena	Roberto Gavaldón	Valentín Trujillo, David Reynoso, Elsa Aguirre, Ofelia Medina		
La hermana Trinquete	René Cardona Jr.	Silvia Pinal, Chespirito, Manolo Fábregas, Carlos East, Evita Muñoz "Chachita"		
Faltas a la moral	Ismael Rodríguez	Ana Martín, Katy Jurado, Alberto Vázquez, Evita Muñoz "Chachita"		
Juan el desalmado	Miguel Morayta	Juan Miranda, Lucha Villa, Eric del Castillo, José Elías Moreno, Andrés García, Blanca Sánchez		
La rebelion de las hijas	José Díaz Morales	Ofelia Medina, Ana Martín, Irma Lozano, Enrique Rambal, Andrés García		
Quinto patio	Federico Curiel	Manuel López Ochoa, Jacqueline Andere, Rogelio Guerra, Norma Lazareno		
La mentira	Emilio Gómez Muriel	Julissa, Enrique Lizalde, Blanca Sánchez, Roberto Cañedo		Co-production with Brazil.
Claudia y el deseo	Miguel Zacarías	Maricruz Olivier, Guillermo Murray, Eric del Castillo, Carlos Bracho		
Los problemas de mamá	Alfredo B. Crevenna	Amparo Rivelles, Jacqueline Andere, Joaquín Cordero, Juan Ferrara, Alicia Bonet		
El amor de María Isabel	Federico Curiel	Silvia Pinal, José Suárez, Norma Lazareno, María Antonieta de las Nieves, Roberto Gómez Bolaños "Chespirito"		
La hermanita dinamita	Rafael Baledón	Hilda Aguirre, Jorge Rivero, Jorge Lavat, Fernando Lujan, Sara García, Ramón Valdés		
Crísto '70	Alejandro Galindo	Carlos Piñar, Nora Larraga "Karla", Gabriel Retes		
Jesús, nuestro Señor	Miguel Zacarías	Claudio Brook, Carlos East, Narciso Busquets, Elsa Cárdenas, Rita Macedo		
Los marcados	Alberto Mariscal	Antonio Aguilar, Flor Silvestre, Eric del Castillo, Carmen Montejo, Javier Ruán		
Chanoc en las garras de las fieras	Gilberto Martínez Solares	Gregorio Casal, Germán Valdés "Tin Tan", Ramón Valdés, Barbara Angely, Letícia Robles		
Las chicas malas del padre Méndez	José María Fernández Unsáin	David Reynoso, Jacqueline Andere, Lupita Ferrer, Norma Lazareno, Carlos Cámara, Víctor Alcocer, Alma Muriel		
Fútbol México 70	Alberto Isaac	Luz María Aguilar, Claudio Brook		1970 FIFA World Cup
Click, fotógrafo de modelos	René Cardona Jr.	Mauricio Garcés, Christa Linder		
Rubí	Carlos Enrique Taboada	Irán Eory, Aldo Monti		
El tunco Maclovio	Alberto Mariscal	Julio Alemán, Mario Almada, Eric del Castillo, Juliancito Bravo, José Ángel Espinoza "Ferrusquilla"		
El cuerpazo del delíto	Rene Cardona	Silvia Pinal, Elsa Aguirre, Angélica María		
El metiche	Gilberto Martínez Solares	Gaspar Henaine "Capulina", Monica Serna, Enrique Pontón, Ivonne Govea		
Lo que mas queremos	Miguel Zacarías	Guillermo Murray, Rosario Granados, Olga Breeskin, Irma Lozano		
El topo	Alexandro Jodorowsky	Alexandro Jodorowsky, Brontis Jodorowsky, David Silva, Alfonso Arau, José Legarreta		
A Man Called Horse	Elliot Silverstein	Richard Harris, Judith Anderson, Jean Gascon, Manu Tupou, Corinna Tsopei, Dub Taylor, James Gammon		Co-production with the United States
Angelitos negros	Joselito Rodríguez	Manuel López Ochoa, Martha Rangel, Titina Romay, Juanita Moore		
Capulina Speedy González	Alfredo Zacarías	Gaspar Henaine, Leonorilda Ochoa		
El oficio más antiguo del mundo	Luis Alcoriza			
Emiliano Zapata	Felipe Cazals	Antonio Aguilar		
Fray Don Juan	René Cardona Jr.	Mauricio Garcés, Lorena Velázquez, Norma Lazareno, Gina Romand, Barbara Angely, Luis Manuel Pelayo		
Macho Callahan	Bernard L. Kowalski	David Janssen, Jean Seberg, Lee J. Cobb, James Booth		Co-production with the United States
Pancho Tequila	Miguel M. Delgado	Alberto Vázquez		
Paraíso	Luis Alcoriza			
Q.R.R (Quien resulte responsable)	Gustavo Alatriste			
The Phantom Gunslinger	Albert Zugsmith	Troy Donahue, Sabrina, Elizabeth Campbell, Emilio Fernández, Germán Robles, Pedro Armendáriz Jr.		Co-production with the United States
Two Mules for Sister Sara	Don Siegel	Shirley MacLaine, Clint Eastwood		Co-production with the United States
Vuelve el ojo de vidrio	René Cardona Jr.	Antonio Aguilar, Flor Silvestre, Manuel Capetillo, Eleazar García, Alejandro Reyna, Guillermo Rivas		
OK Cleopatra	René Cardona Jr.	Enrique Guzmán, Enrique Rambal, Lupita Ferrer, Ángel Garasa, Lucy Gallardo		Co-production with Venezuela.

== See also ==
- 1970 in Mexico
