= List of Mexican films of 1969 =

A list of the films produced in Mexico in 1969 (see 1969 in film):

== 1969 ==
Title	Director	Cast	Genre	Notes
1969
Cuando los hijos se van	Julián Soler	Fernando Soler, Amparo Rivelles, Alberto Vázquez		
El aviso inoportuno	Rafael Baledón	Los Polivoces, Alfonso Arau, Javier López "Chabelo", Marco Antonio Campos "Viruta", Ramón Valdés		
El crepúsculo de un dios	Emilio Fernández	Emilio Fernández, Ana Luisa Peluffo		
El libro de piedra	Carlos Enrique Taboada	Marga López, Norma Lazareno		
Modisto de señoras	René Cardona Jr.	Mauricio Garcés, Zulma Faiad, Patricia Aspillaga, Irlanda Mora		
La casa de las muchachas	Fernando Cortés	Amparo Rivelles, Enrique Rambal, Maura Monti, Gilda Mirós		
La muñeca perversa	Rafael Baledón	Marga López, Joaquín Cordero		
Los recuerdos del porvenir	Arturo Ripstein	Pedro Armendáriz Jr., Susana Dosamantes		
Un Quijote sin mancha	Miguel M. Delgado	Cantinflas, Lupita Ferrer, Ángel Garasa		
Las Pirañas aman en Cuaresma	Francisco del Villar	Isela Vega, Julio Alemán		
Cuernos debajo de la cama	Ismael Rodríguez	Tere Velázquez, Espartaco Santoni, Isela Vega		
Dos valientes	Alfonso Corona Blake	Luis Aguilar, Lucha Villa, Rodolfo de Anda, Juan Gallardo, Dagoberto Rodríguez		
Flor marchita	Rogelio A. González	María Rivas, Sara García, Ofelia Guilmain, Guillermo Murray		
El pecado de Adán y Eva	Miguel Zacarías	Jorge Rivero, Candy Wilson		
Jesús, María y José	Miguel Zacarías	Guillermo Murray, Eric del Castillo, Enrique Rambal		
Todo por nada	Alberto Mariscal	Mario Almada, Fernando Almada, Narciso Busquets, Pedro Armendáriz Jr., Bruno Rey		
Somos novios	Enrique Carreras	Angélica María, Palito Ortega, Armando Manzanero		Co-production with Argentina
Al rojo vivo	Gilberto Gazcón	Zulma Faiad, Jorge Rivero, Rodolfo de Anda	Drama	
El Mundo de los Aviones		Gaspar "Capulina" Henaine, Lucy Gallardo, Enrique Rambal		
El día de las madres		Sara García		
El ojo de vidrio	René Cardona Jr.	Antonio Aguilar, Flor Silvestre, Manuel Capetillo, Eleazar García, Alejandro Reyna, Guillermo Rivas		
La señora Muerte	Jaime Salvador	John Carradine, Regina Torné		
La venganza de Huracán Ramírez	Joselito Rodríguez	Pepe Romay, Titina Romay, David Silva, Jean Safont, Freddy Fernández, Tonina Jackson		
Las golfas	Fernando Cortés	Isela Vega, Gilda Mirós, Gina Romand, José Luis Rodríguez, Ángel Garasa		
Lauro Puñales	René Cardona	Antonio Aguilar, Flor Silvestre, Jaime Fernández		
No se mande, profe	Alfredo B. Crevenna	Enrique Guzmán, Hilda Aguirre		
Pasiones infernales	Juan Orol	Velda González, Héctor Suárez, Esther Sandoval, Jaime Ruiz Escobar, Luis Antonio Cosme		
Persíguelas y alcanzalas				
Shark!	Samuel Fuller	Burt Reynolds, Silvia Pinal		Co-production with the United States
The Olympics in Mexico	Alberto Isaac			Nominated for an Academy Award for Best Documentary Feature

== See also ==
- 1969 in Mexico
