= Antonio Aguilar filmography =

Over the course of his career, Antonio Aguilar made over 400 films.

| Year | Title | Notes |
|---|---|---|
| 1952 | Un Rincon Cerca del Cielo | |
| 1952 | Ahora soy Rico | |
| 1952 | Yo Fui una Callejera | |
| 1953 | Por el mismo camino | |
| 1953 | Amor de Locura | |
| 1953 | Había una Vez un Marido | |
| 1953 | The Naked Woman | |
| 1953 | Mi Papá Tuvo la Culpa | |
| 1953 | Mi adorada Clementina | |
| 1953 | La Segunda Mujer | |
| 1953 | Yo Soy Muy Macho | |
| 1954 | Reventa de Esclavas | |
| 1954 | El Casto Susano | |
| 1955 | La Barranca de la Muerte | |
| 1955 | El Gavilán Vengador | |
| 1955 | Una Gallega en la Habana | |
| 1956 | La Huella del Chacal | |
| 1956 | El Fin de un Imperio | |
| 1957 | ¡Aquí están los Aguilares! | |
| 1957 | Cien Muchachas | |
| 1957 | Cuatro Contra el Imperio | |
| 1957 | La Justicia del Gavilán Vengador | |
| 1957 | La Cama de Piedra | |
| 1957 | La Ley de la Sierra | |
| 1958 | La Guarida del Buitre | |
| 1958 | Aquí Está Heraclio Bernal | |
| 1958 | Fiesta en el Corazón | |
| 1958 | Los Muertos No Hablan | |
| 1958 | La Cucaracha | |
| 1958 | Las Tres Pelonas | |
| 1959 | Yo... El Aventurero | |
| 1959 | Los Santos Reyes | |
| 1960 | Dos Hijos Desobedientes | |
| 1960 | El Siete de Copas | |
| 1960 | La Sombra del Caudillo | |
| 1960 | Rumbo a Brasilia (México, Brasil) | |
| 1960 | Bala Perdida | |
| 1960 | Que Bonito Amor | |
| 1961 | Vacaciones en Acapulco | |
| 1961 | La Joven Mancornadora | |
| 1961 | Los Hermanos del Hierro | |
| 1961 | Que Me Maten en Tus Brazos | |
| 1961 | El Caballo Blanco | |
| 1961 | Ahí Vienen los Argumedo | |
| 1962 | Ánimas Trujano | |
| 1962 | Sol en Llamas | |
| 1962 | Cazadores de Asesinos | |
| 1962 | Si Yo Fuera Millonario | |
| 1963 | Aquí Está Tu Enamorado | |
| 1963 | Yo, el Mujeriego | |
| 1963 | La Gitana y el Charro | |
| 1963 | Vuelven los Argumedo | |
| 1964 | El revólver sangriento | |
| 1964 | Gabino Barrera | |
| 1964 | El Alazán y el Rosillo | actor, producer and writer |
| 1965 | El Padre Diablo | |
| 1965 | Escuela para solteras | |
| 1965 | Alma llanera | |
| 1965 | Juan Colorado | |
| 1965 | El Hijo de Gabino Barrera | |
| 1965 | Los Dos Rivales | |
| 1966 | La Vida de Pedro Infante | |
| 1966 | Los Cuatro Juanes | |
| 1966 | Alazán y Enamorado | |
| 1967 | La Venganza de Gabino Barrera | |
| 1967 | El Ojo de Vidrio | |
| 1967 | La Captura de Gabino Barrera | |
| 1967 | Los Alegres Aguilares | |
| 1968 | Lucio Vázquez | |
| 1968 | El As de Oros | |
| 1969 | El Caballo Bayo | |
| 1969 | Lauro Puñales | |
| 1969 | The Undefeated | |
| 1970 | Emiliano Zapata | actor, producer and writer |
| 1970 | Vuelve el ojo de vidrio | writer |
| 1970 | Los Marcados | writer and producer |
| 1972 | La Yegua Colorada | |
| 1973 | Valente Quintero | actor and producer |
| 1973 | La Muerte de Pancho Villa | writer |
| 1973 | Peregrina | actor, producer and editor |
| 1974 | Simón Blanco | |
| 1974 | Mi Aventura en Puerto Rico | |
| 1975 | Don Herculano Enamorado | actor and producer |
| 1975 | El rey | |
| 1976 | El Moro de Cumpas | |
| 1977 | Volver, Volver, Volver | escritor, actor and producer |
| 1977 | La Muerte de un Gallero | escritor, actor and producer |
| 1977 | Soy el Hijo del Gallero | |
| 1977 | Sabor a Sangre | |
| 1977 | Mi Caballo el Cantador | writer and actor |
| 1978 | Los Triunfadores | |
| 1979 | Benjamín Argumedo, el Rebelde | |
| 1979 | Albur de Amor | escritor, actor and producer |
| 1980 | Persecución y Muerte de Benjamín Argumedo | |
| 1980 | El Tonto que Hacía Milagros | |
| 1981 | Los Gemelos Alborotados | writer and actor |
| 1981 | Noche de Carnaval | producer and writer |
| 1982 | El Ánima de Sayula | actor and editor |
| 1983 | Viva el Chubasco | escritor, actor and producer |
| 1983 | El Rey de Oros | |
| 1985 | Astucia | |
| 1986 | Contrabando y Muerte | escritor, actor and producer |
| 1987 | Lamberto Quintero | actor and producer |
| 1987 | Zapata en Chinameca | actor and producer |
| 1988 | Domingo Corrales | actor and producer |
| 1990 | El Hijo de Lamberto Quintero | |
| 1991 | Triste Recuerdo | actor and producer |
| 1992 | El Chivo | actor and producer |
| 1993 | La Sangre de un Valiente | actor and producer |
| 1994 | La Güera Chabela | producer |
