= Estudios América =

Former Mexican film studio and production company

Estudios América (English: America Studios) was a Mexican film studio and production company which grew to prominence producing films for Antonio Aguilar, Gaspar Henaine, María Elena Velasco, and Vicente Fernández. It was one of the four main film studios of the classic Mexican cinema along with Estudios Churubusco, Estudios San Ángel, and Estudios Tepeyac and one of the largest production companies in 1976.

The studio's sound stages appear in Duro pero seguro, a 1978 film starring María Elena Velasco as La India María, who became the studio's exclusive artist in the early 1980s after her contract with Diana Films ended.

In 1993, the studio was sold by the Mexican government as part of the sale of Imevisión. Bought by Ricardo Salinas Pliego, the studio shut down as a film company and in 1996 was converted into a television studio for TV Azteca, where their soap operas and other programming are taped. In 2012, the studio was expanded and currently consists of twelve soundstages.

== Selected films produced by Estudios América ==
Year	Film	Stars
1965	El proceso de Cristo	Enrique Rocha
1968	Dos valientes	Luis Aguilar
1969	Lauro Puñales	Antonio Aguilar
1969	El ojo de vidrio	Antonio Aguilar
1970	Vuelve el ojo de vidrio	Antonio Aguilar
1970	Capulina Speedy Gonzalez	Gaspar Henaine
1970	Confesiones de una adolescente	Hilda Aguirre
1971	Vuelo 701	Sonia Furió
1972	Tonta, tonta, pero no tanto	María Elena Velasco
1973	Tu camino y el mio	Vicente Fernández
1973	Uno y medio contra el mundo	Vicente Fernández
1973	Capulina contra las momias	Gaspar Henaine
1974	Pobre niño rico	Maricruz Olivier
1975	El albañil	Vicente Fernández

== Selected films shot at Estudios América ==
Year	Film	Stars
1968	Caballo prieto azabache	Antonio Aguilar
1969	Lauro Puñales	Antonio Aguilar
1969	El ojo de vidrio	Antonio Aguilar
1970	Vuelve el ojo de vidrio	Antonio Aguilar
1970	Capulina Speedy Gonzalez	Gaspar Henaine
1970	Jesús, Nuestro Señor	Claudio Brook
1972	Jesús, El Niño Dios	Jorge Rivero
1972	Jesús, María y José	Guillermo Murray
1972	Tacos al carbón	Vicente Fernández
1972	Tonta, tonta, pero no tanto	María Elena Velasco
1972	Los cacos	Germán Valdés
1973	Tu camino y el mio	Vicente Fernández
1973	Uno y medio contra el mundo	Vicente Fernández
1973	Valente Quintero	Antonio Aguilar
1973	Capulina contra las momias	Gaspar Henaine
1973	Pobre pero Honrada	María Elena Velasco
1974	Jalisco nunca pierde	Vicente Fernández
1974	El hijo del pueblo	Vicente Fernández
1974	La madrecita	María Elena Velasco
1974	El carita	Gaspar Henaine
1975	La presidenta municipal	María Elena Velasco
1975	El albañil	Vicente Fernández
1976	El miedo no anda en burro	María Elena Velasco
