= Norvind =

Norvind is a surname. Notable people with the surname include:

- Eva Norvind (1944–2006), Norwegian-Mexican actress, writer, producer, director, and sex therapist
- Naian Gonzalez Norvind (born 1992), Mexican actress and writer
- Nailea Norvind (born 1970), Mexican actress
