= Valente Quintero (film) =

- Theatrical release poster
- Directed by: Mario Hernández
- Screenplay by: Mario Hernández; Antonio Aguilar
- Based on: "Valente Quintero" by Rosendo Monzón
- Produced by: Antonio Aguilar
- Starring: Antonio Aguilar; Saby Kamalich; Narciso Busquets; Sara García; Eleazar García «Chelelo» Cornelio Reyna; Alejandro Reyna «Tío Plácido»
- Narrated by: Eleazar García
- Cinematography: Fernando Álvarez Colín
- Edited by: Sergio Soto
- Music by: Sergio Guerrero
- Production company: Estudios América
- Distributed by: Producciones Águila
- Release date: April 12, 1973 (Mexico City)
- Running time: 85 minutes
- Country: Mexico
- Language: Spanish
- Box office: $1,036,752

Valente Quintero is a 1973 Mexican historical drama film directed by Mario Hernández and starring Antonio Aguilar, Saby Kamalich, Narciso Busquets, Sara García, Eleazar García «Chelelo» and Cornelio Reyna. The supporting cast includes Enriqueta Jiménez «La Prieta Linda» and Alejandro Reyna «Tío Plácido», among others.

Flor Silvestre appears in a special musical performance.

Valente Quintero was the second-highest grossing film of 1973 in Mexico City.

== Plot ==
Around 1973, two foreign tourists stop at the provincial town of Perales. Two small memorials surrounded by pebbles in a corner of a street attract their attention. Two elderly veterans of the Mexican Revolution, Chelelo and Cornelio, come out from a nearby building to receive them. They explain to the tourists about the memorials and to whom are they in memory of. Chelelo then recounts the story of two revolutionary friends, Sub-lieutenant Valente Quintero and Major Atanasio Pizarro, who fought in a battle in one of Perales' residential streets.

Valente is severely injured when he is shot in front of the late General Gumersindo Carrillo's house, where his widow, doña Elvira Peña, his daughter, Leonor Carrillo, and their housemaid, Carmen, reside. Leonor decides to help Valente, against her mother's wishes. Leonor then tells her mother that she is returning a favor that could have been made to her father, who died bleeding in the midst of a forest. Leonor runs across the street to get the town's drunkard physician, Doctor Plácido. Elvira, Carmen, and Leonor carry Valente into the house and lay him in a bed. Valente stays ill in bed for several days.

His friend Atanasio later receives word of his survival. Atanasio falls in love with the elegant and sophisticated Leonor and admires the conservative and sharp-tongued matron Elvira. Valente and Leonor also start a romantic relationship, which leads to marriage. Atanasio, now a rich and alcoholic landowner, duels Valente for the love of Leonor on the night of their honeymoon. Valente and Atanasio kill each other.

== Cast ==
- Antonio Aguilar as Valente Quintero
- Saby Kamalich as Leonor Carrillo
- Narciso Busquets as Atanasio Pizarro
- Sara García as Elvira Peña
- Eleazar García as Chelelo
- Cornelio Reyna as Cornelio
- Flor Silvestre as Rafaela
- Enriqueta Jiménez as Carmen
- Alejandro Reyna as Doctor Plácido
- Salvador Sánchez as a Carrancista captain
- Vicky Roig as a Female tourist
- Paco Sañudo as Procopio

== Production ==
Principal photography for Valente Quintero commenced in the village of Tayahua, Zacatecas, on February 23, 1972. Other few scenes were shot in sound stages at Estudios América in Mexico City. Filming ended on March 17 of the same year. La yegua colorada, the first film directed by Mario Hernández, had been shot in January 1972 but was released later than Valente Quintero.

== Music ==
The film features an acoustic music score by Sergio Guerrero, and four of the ten songs featured in the film were written by Antonio Aguilar who was credited under his pseudonym "Pascual Barraza".

=== Songs ===
- "Valente Quintero" – written by Pascual Barraza and performed by Antonio Aguilar.
- "Que se Vaya mi Vida" – written by Cornelio Reyna and performed by Cornelio Reyna.
- "No me lo Tomes a Mal" – written by José Ángel Espinoza and performed by Flor Silvestre.
- "Paloma Querida" – written by José Alfredo Jiménez and performed by Antonio Aguilar.
- "De las 3 que Vienen Ahi" – written by Pascual Barraza and performed by Antonio Aguilar.
- "Tu Tienes la Culpa" – written by Cornelio Reyna and performed by Cornelio Reyna.
- "Ora no me Voy de Aqui" – written by Pascual Barraza and performed by Antonio Aguilar.
- "Dos Corazones Errantes" – written by Benjamín Sánchez Mota and performed by Antonio Aguilar.
- "Ya no Llores" – written by Cornelio Reyna and performed by Cornelio Reyna and Eleazar García.
- "Mira Elvira" – written by Pascual Barraza and performed by Antonio Aguilar.

== Reception ==
The film premiered in Mexico City, on April 12, 1973, exclusively in the theaters Mariscala, Carrusel, De la Villa, and Marina for six weeks. Along with La yegua colorada, another film he also directed, Mario Hernández tried to revive the Mexican Revolution subject in Mexican cinema.
