= Juan Pistolas (1966 film) =

- Directed by: René Cardona Jr.
- Written by: Alfredo Zacarías
- Produced by: Mario A. Zacarías
- Starring: Javier Solís; Eleazar Garcia "Chelelo"; Eva Norvind; Aurora Alvarado
- Cinematography: José Ortiz Ramos
- Edited by: Gloria Schoemann
- Music by: Víctor Cordero; Manuel Esperón
- Production company: Producciones Zacarías
- Release date: 13 October 1966
- Running time: 90 minutes
- Country: Mexico
- Language: Spanish

Juan Pistolas is a 1966 Mexican adventure film produced by Mario A. Zacarías, written by Alfredo Zacarías, directed by René Cardona Jr. and starring Javier Solís, Eleazar Garcia "Chelelo", Eva Norvind and Aurora Alvarado.

== Cast ==
- Javier Solís
- Eleazar Garcia "Chelelo"
- Eva Norvind
- Aurora Alvarado
- John Kelly
- Crox Alvarado
- Carlos Agostí
- Guillermo Rivas
- Carlos Ruffino
- Stillman Segar
- Antonio Raxel
- José Eduardo Pérez
- Fernando Yapur
- Manuel Dondé
