= El revólver sangriento =

1964 film

- Theatrical poster
- Directed by: Miguel M. Delgado
- Screenplay by: Alfredo Salazar
- Starring: Luis Aguilar; Lola Beltrán; Flor Silvestre; Manuel Capetillo; Cuco Sánchez; Antonio Aguilar; Irma Dorantes
- Cinematography: José Ortiz Ramos
- Edited by: Jorge Bustos
- Music by: Antonio Díaz Conde
- Production company: Cinematográfica Calderón
- Release date: April 2, 1964 (Mexico City)
- Running time: 98 minutes
- Country: Mexico
- Language: Spanish

El revólver sangriento ("The Bloody Revolver" in English) is a 1964 Mexican western drama film directed by Miguel M. Delgado, and starring Luis Aguilar, Lola Beltrán, Flor Silvestre, Manuel Capetillo, Cuco Sánchez, Antonio Aguilar and Irma Dorantes, with the special participation of the comedian actors, Eleazar García «Chelelo» and María Elena Velasco «La India María».

The lead actors were credited in an unusual "rigorous appearance on the screen" style, where the film's main characters are not ordered by importance, but by on-screen appearance. Written for the screen by Alfredo Salazar, the film was a production of Cinematográfica Calderón and follows the account of a silver-plated revolver, which has a deadly curse and falls on the hands of different men.

== Plot ==
The film opens in a cave with a close-up of Juan Chávez's (Luis Aguilar) silver-plated revolver as he glances at a "Wanted" poster that offers a reward, dead or alive, for his capture. A suspicious man follows Juan out of the cave, and traces him into a small town. There, he enters a bar called "La Patrona", whose bartender is Carmen (Lola Beltrán) who is infatuated with Juan. She serves him something to drink, and they converse, as a next scene focuses on a beautiful woman named Rosa (Flor Silvestre) who sings the song "Cariño bonito" as she waters her geraniums and watches her birds. At the end of her singing, her aunt (Emma Roldán) arrives at the house and tells her of Juan's return to the town. She replies that he came back for her to take her with him, and to prepare her clothes. When Rosa arrives at the bar, Juan responds to her coldly, and even depreciates her.

== Cast ==
- Luis Aguilar as Juan Chavéz, outlaw who dies in a duel for the love of Rosa or Carmen.
- Lola Beltrán as Carmen, bartender girl who is in love with Juan.
- Flor Silvestre as Rosa, Juan's love-interest and former girlfriend.
- René Cardona as Sheriff
- Emilio Fernández as Félix Gómez, as jailed bandit who escapes with the revolver.
- Manuel Capetillo as Rogelio Cruz, horse wrangler who steals Félix's money and revolver.
- Cuco Sánchez as Cuco
- Antonio Aguilar as Ramón, ex-bandit who seeks a peaceful life as a cattle rancher.
- Irma Dorantes as Ramón's wife, and mother of his child.
- David Silva as "El Manso"
- Arturo Martínez as "El Chacal"
- David Reynoso as "El Toro" Díaz
- Enrique Lucero as Pedro
- Emma Roldán as Rosa's aunt
- Jorge Mondragón as the Doctor
- Jose Chávez as the Hotel owner
- Lupe Mejía as Vicente's wife
- Julián de Meriche as don León
- Alfonso Arnold as Sheriff Ruiz
- Jorge Russek as "El Toro"'s bandit
- Quintín Bulnes as "Chimuelo"
- Leon Barroso as Manuel
- Emilio Garibay as Vigilant
- Eleazar García «Chelelo» as the stagecoach driver
- María Elena Velasco «La India María» as Pedro's wife, and the mother of his three children.
- Carlos León as assistant commissioner

== Soundtrack ==
- "Cuando no se de ti", written by Enrique Sarabia and performed by Irma Dorantes.
- "Cariño bonito", written by Cuco Sánchez and performed by Flor Silvestre.
- "Fallaste corazón", written and performed by Cuco Sánchez.
- "El hombre alegre", written by Cuco Sánchez and performed by Manuel Capetillo.
- "Nube bajas", written by Tomás Méndez and performed by Lola Beltrán.
- "Cuando dos almas", written by Fructuoso G. Reyes and performed by Antonio Aguilar.
- "El pecador", written by Alex F. Roth and performed by Juan Mendoza.

== International releases ==
The film was released in Italy in 1966, under the title Duello a Santo Cruz (Duel in Santa Cruz). Some of the Italian promotional movie posters for the film only credit James Fields, the sound supervisor, Jorge Russek, as "Georgia Russek", David Silva as "David Rayen", and Quintín Bulnes as "Quentin Bulness" as the head cast.

== Home media releases ==
Laguna Films has released the film individually in VHS once, and also along other four Antonio Aguilar feature films in DVD in the "Latigo Norteño" double-sided 2-disc pack.
