= Beaks: The Movie =

- Directed by: René Cardona Jr.
- Written by: René Cardona Jr.
- Produced by: René Cardona Jr.
- Starring: Christopher Atkins; Michelle Johnson
- Cinematography: Leopoldo Villaseñor
- Edited by: Jesús Paredes
- Music by: Stelvio Cipriani
- Distributed by: International Video Entertainment
- Release dates: October 1987 (USA); 30 October 1991 (France)
- Running time: 100 minutes
- Country: Mexico
- Language: English

Beaks: The Movie (Spanish: El ataque de los pájaros, "The Attack of the Birds") is a 1987 English-language Mexican horror film written, produced and directed by René Cardona Jr. It stars Michelle Johnson and Christopher Atkins as reporters trying to figure out why birds have starting attacking people. It was first released in Europe in 1987 and also known as Beaks: The Birds 2, Birds of Prey and Evil Birds.

== Plot ==
Vanessa, a television reporter covering a story about a farmer attacked by his chickens, discovers that this is not an isolated incident. Travelling to Spain with her henchman, (also cameraman and boyfriend) Peter, the two discover the survivors of a town wiped out by the birds thirty years ago. Meanwhile, attacks continue as a child's birthday party ends in tragedy and doves devour a poultry farmer and his wife. Vanessa soon comes to the conclusion that the birds are organizing themselves against the ecological ravages of man (for what they did to them), but time is running out as thousands of birds of all types launch attack for revenge against a train Vanessa is travelling on. The birds then attack the whole town village in the movie.

== See also ==
- The Birds, an Alfred Hitchcock movie in which birds turn against humans.
