= La casa de las muchachas =

- Directed by: Fernando Cortés
- Screenplay by: Alfredo Varela; Fernando Cortés
- Based on: a play by Juan Vaszary and Juan José de Arteche
- Produced by: Fernando Cortés; Lucho Gatica
- Starring: Amparo Rivelles; Enrique Rambal; Maura Monti; Gilda Mirós; Malú Reyes
- Cinematography: Roberto Jaramillo
- Edited by: Sergio Soto
- Music by: Sergio Guerrero
- Production companies: Producciones Fernando J. Cortés, S.A.
- Release date: 30 October 1969 (Mexico)
- Running time: 110 minutes
- Country: Mexico
- Language: Spanish

La casa de las muchachas (Spanish: "The House of the Girls") is a 1969 Mexican comedy film directed by Fernando Cortés and starring Amparo Rivelles, Enrique Rambal, Maura Monti, Gilda Mirós and Malú Reyes.

== Plot ==
A Mexican, winner of the Nobel Prize, returns to the town where he was born. The local authorities, in tribute, decide to place a plaque on the house where he was born, only to realize that his birthplace is now the local brothel. Consequently, they try to ask the madame to leave the house with her prostitutes and she refuses, but when the honoree arrives, she and her pupils pass themselves as a widow and her decent daughters. From there, the man involuntarily transforms the brothel into a decent house.

== Reparto ==
- Amparo Rivelles as Doña Marta
- Enrique Rambal as Marcelo Ledón
- Maura Monti as Ana Luisa "La Marquesa"
- Gilda Mirós as Amalia "La Profe"
- Malú Reyes
- Héctor Lechuga as Commissioner
- Óscar Ortiz de Pinedo as Ahumado Cienfuegos, chief of the fire department
- Óscar Pulido as Abundio Oropeza, Mayor
- Carolina Cortázar
- Alfredo Varela as Ramirito
- Antonio Raxel as Fernández (as Antonio Raxell)
- Arturo Cobo
- Gloria Jordán
- Florencio Castelló
- Mario Herrera
- Ada Carrasco
- Clara Osollo
- Reyna Dunn
- Rogelio Moreno
- Julián de Meriche
