= Uno y medio contra el mundo =

- Directed by: José Estrada
- Written by: José Estrada
- Starring: Vicente Fernández; Ofelia Medina; Rocío Brambila
- Cinematography: Fernando Colín
- Edited by: Ángel Camacho
- Music by: Sergio Guerrero
- Production companies: Cinematográfica Marte S.A. Estudios América
- Release date: 1 November 1973 (Mexico)
- Running time: 85 minutes
- Country: Mexico
- Language: Spanish

Uno y medio contra el mundo (English: "One and a Half Against the World") is a 1973 Mexican comedy drama film directed by José Estrada and starring Vicente Fernández, Ofelia Medina and Rocío Brambila.

== Plot ==
Lauro (Fernández) is a thief who, while escaping from one of his robberies, meets a boy named Chava (Brambila), who is as much of a rogue as he is. Upon arriving in Mexico City they decide to work and live together. They move to a barber shop where Chava begins teaching Lauro to read. After Lauro is apprehended for his crimes, and while visiting him in jail, Chava reveals that he is actually a female. Years later, after Lauro leaves prison, he meets the already adult Chava (Medina), and they decide to steal as before, with her disguised as a male. As time passes, they both fall in love and one day they kiss. However, a group of drunks see them, and due to Chava's disguise, confuses them for a homosexual couple, and they attack them violently, pummeling Lauro and stabbing Chava. The film ends with an injured Lauro carrying the already dead Chava in his arms as another child tried to join him. Lauro leaves, not wanting to expose another person to death once more.

== Cast ==
- Vicente Fernández as Lauro
- Ofelia Medina as adult Chava
- Rocío Brambila as child Chava
- Mario García González
- José Chávez (credited as José Chávez Trowe)
- Alfredo Gutiérrez
- Ernesto Gómez Cruz
- Eduardo López Rojas
- Yolanda Vázquez
- Federico González
- Jorge Fegán
- Armando Acosta
- Juan Garza
- Lalo "El Mimo" (credited as Lalo de la Peña 'El Mimo')
- Alfredo Rosas
- Vicente Fernández Jr. (credited as Vicente F. Abarca)
- Manuel Dondé
- Felipe del Castillo
- Gustavo Negrete (credited as Gustavo del Castillo)
- Jesús Gómez

== Reception ==
In Cinema of Solitude: A Critical Study of Mexican Film, 1967–1983, Charles Ramírez Berg mentions the film together with El albañil (The Bricklayer, 1975) and El Coyote y la Bronca (Coyote and Bronca, 1980) as examples of films of Vicente Fernández in which "the Fernández character is helped by women, and he is able to accept it without feeling that he is losing his manhood," because "For him, women are mysterious but unthreatening, so he treats them as equals, not as serfs." A review by Etcétera in 2019 considers the film Vicente Fernández's "only worthwhile" film, "perhaps together" with El albañil.

Because of the film's ending, in which Ofelia Medina's character is stabbed for kissing Vicente Fernández's character while she is dressed as a man, the film received notoriety after a controversy in which Fernández claimed in 2019 that he refused to receive a liver transplant, after being diagnosed with cancer, in case the donor was homosexual. Etcétera's review stated "46 years after that film, Vicente Fernández himself still does not understand."

== Bibliography ==
- Ramírez Berg, Charles. Cinema of Solitude: A Critical Study of Mexican Film, 1967–1983. University of Texas Press, 2010.
