= Vuelve el ojo de vidrio =

1970 Mexican epic film

- Lobby card
- Directed by: René Cardona Jr.
- Screenplay by: Alfredo Varela, Jr.
- Story by: Alfredo Varela, Jr. Antonio Aguilar
- Based on: El ojo de vidrio by Víctor Cordero
- Produced by: Jacobo Derechín
- Starring: Antonio Aguilar; Flor Silvestre; Manuel Capetillo; Eleazar García «Chelelo» Alejandro Reyna «Tío Plácido» Guillermo Rivas
- Cinematography: Raúl Domínguez
- Edited by: Federico Landeros
- Music by: Enrico C. Cabiati
- Production company: Estudios América
- Distributed by: Cinematográfica Águila
- Release date: January 8, 1970 (Mexico City)
- Running time: 107 minutes
- Country: Mexico
- Language: Spanish

Vuelve el ojo de vidrio ('The Glass Eye Returns') is a 1970 Mexican revolution-epic film, written and directed by René Cardona Jr. and starring Antonio Aguilar, Flor Silvestre, Manuel Capetillo, Eleazar García «Chelelo», Alejandro Reyna «Tío Plácido», and Guillermo Rivas. It is the sequel to the film El ojo de vidrio.

== Plot summary ==
The story follows Porfirio and his band of loyal followers, including his brothers Gumaro, Chelelo, Plácido, and Jerónimo Buenavista, as they continue their fight against oppression and injustice in revolutionary Mexico. Porfirio's romantic interest María "La Coralillo" remains by his side as both a love interest and a fierce companion in their revolutionary activities.

The plot centers around the group's conflict with Melitón Barbosa, a corrupt official who represents the ongoing political corruption that plagued Mexico during this period. As government forces under Carrancista soldiers pursue the revolutionary band, Porfirio must use his cunning, marksmanship, and leadership skills to protect his people and advance their cause.

The film incorporates typical elements of the Mexican Revolution cinema genre, including horseback chases, gunfights, betrayals, and displays of revolutionary heroism. Musical numbers featuring traditional Mexican folk songs are woven throughout the narrative, reflecting the cultural importance of music in Mexican revolutionary folklore.

The story builds to a climactic confrontation where Porfirio's tactical brilliance and the loyalty of his followers are put to the ultimate test against superior government forces, ultimately reinforcing the themes of justice, brotherhood, and resistance against tyranny that defined the Mexican Revolution era.

== Cast ==
- Antonio Aguilar as Porfirio Alcalá y Buenavista "El Ojo de Vidrio"
- Flor Silvestre as María "La Coralillo"
- Manuel Capetillo as Gumaro Buenavista
- Eleazar García as Chelelo Buenavista
- Alejandro Reyna as Plácido Buenavista
- Guillermo Rivas as Jerónimo Buenavista
- Arturo Martínez as Melitón Barbosa
- Yuyú Varela as Socorro González "La Cocorito"
- Alfredo Varela, Jr. as Mr. Fregoli "Fregolini"
- Eduardo Alcázar as Colonel
- Emma Arvizu as Colonel's Wife
- Jorge Cabrera
- Miguel Ángel Gómez as Melitón's Friend
- René Cardona Jr. as Mission Priest
- Mario García "Harapos" as Carrancista Soldier
- Fernando Durán Rojas (as Fernando Durán)
- Juan Hernández
- Jesús Gómez as Carrancista Sentinel
- Carlos Suárez
- Fídel Castañeda
- Salvador Aguilar
- Roberto Iglesias
