= Capulina contra las momias =

- Directed by: Alfredo Zacarías
- Written by: Alfredo Zacarías
- Produced by: Alfredo Zacarías
- Starring: Gaspar Henaine «Capulina» Jacqueline Voltaire
- Cinematography: Raúl Domínguez
- Edited by: Francisco Chiu
- Music by: Carlos Camacho
- Production companies: Estudios América; Panorama Films
- Release date: October 8, 1973 (Mexico)
- Running time: 91 minutes
- Country: Mexico
- Language: Spanish

Capulina contra las momias ("Capulina Against the Mummies") is a 1973 Mexican horror comedy film produced, written, and directed by Alfredo Zacarías, and starring Gaspar Henaine «Capulina» and Jacqueline Voltaire. This is the only film in which Capulina acts alongside Voltaire (as his romantic interest), and the second part of a trilogy of comedy films based in Halloween Night, including Capulina contra los vampiros (1971) and Capulina contra los monstruos (1974).

== Plot ==
A taxi driver winds up working as a butler for a old scientist who is trying to revive mummies.

== Cast ==
- Gaspar Henaine as Capulina
- Jacqueline Voltaire as Jackie
- Freddy Fernández as Scientist's Nephew
- Enrique Pontón as Scientist
- Miguel Ángel Sanroman as The Mummy / The Monday Thief
- Manuel Dondé as The Dead One
- Cristóbal Martell as Second Mummy
- Citlali Breceda as Rejuvenated Mummy
- Argentina Candelario as Rejuvenated Mummy
- Dinorah Cornejo as Rejuvenated Mummy
- Susana Álvarez as Rejuvenated Mummy
- Leticia Perdigón as Rejuvenated Mummy
- Sessi Castin as Rejuvenated Mummy
- Cecilia Leger as Capulina's Mother
