= Jesús, nuestro Señor =

- Directed by: Miguel Zacarías
- Screenplay by: Alfredo Zacarías
- Based on: The Four Gospels
- Produced by: Alfredo Zacarías
- Starring: Claudio Brook; Narciso Busquets; Elsa Cárdenas; Pancho Córdova; Carlos Agostí
- Cinematography: Eduardo Rojo
- Edited by: Federico Landeros
- Music by: Enrico C. Cabiati
- Production company: Estudios América
- Distributed by: Panorama Films
- Release date: April 8, 1971 (Mexico)
- Running time: 115 minutes
- Country: Mexico
- Language: Spanish

Jesús, nuestro Señor (English: Jesus, our Lord) is a 1971 Mexican religious epic film starring Claudio Brook in the title role as Jesus. It was directed by Miguel Zacarías and produced and written by Alfredo Zacarías. The film features an ensemble cast that includes Narciso Busquets, Elsa Cárdenas, Pancho Córdova, and Carlos Agostí.

Shot in 1969, the film was released on Holy Thursday, April 8, 1971. It was filmed in full color and is the last installment of a trilogy that includes Jesús, el niño Dios and Jesús, María y José.

== Trivia ==
- In a scene in which Jesus enters Jerusalem, the houses at Guanajuato were almost seen
- In another scene, the crowd gathered for the Sermon on the Mount scene amidst the volcano Popocatepetl as the backdrop
- In this film most of the scenes were filmed in 1969, and couple of them were filmed in 1970.
- The 1st Movie of Claudio Brook filmed coming back to his home country from Europe.

== Differences Between the Film and the Gospel ==
- The presence of John the Apostle is only appeared on the Gospels when Jesus called the first four apostles. In the film, in the Baptism scene, John was looking for the Messiah by approaching another John, the Baptist.
- The Crucifixion scene is followed directly by the appearance of Christ to the Apostles and the Ascension scene. In the Gospels, the death of Jesus is followed by the burial and resurrection before going to the Ascension.
- The Pater Noster is supposed to be used during the Sermon at the Mount scenes in most film adaptations of Jesus. This prayer is said by apostles followed by an act of Benediction by Jesus to them before going up to Heaven.

== See also ==
- Claudio Brook
- Mexican films of 1969
- Mexican films of 1970
