= Jacqueline Voltaire =

British-born Mexican actress, model and singer

- Born: Jacqueline Anne Walter Clisson; 6 November 1948; Warwickshire, England, United Kingdom
- Died: 8 April 2008 (aged 59); Mexico City, Mexico
- Other name: Jackie
- Occupations: Actress, singer, model, vedette and dancer

Jacqueline Voltaire (6 November 1948 – 8 April 2008) was a British-born Mexican actress, singer, model, vedette and dancer, known for her successful career in telenovelas, especially on Televisa. Voltaire also appeared in Mexican and international films, including Alejandro Jodorowsky's The Holy Mountain in 1973, John Sayles' Men with Guns and Dune, which was directed by David Lynch.

Voltaire was born as Jacqueline Anne Walter Clisson in Warwickshire, England, United Kingdom, on 6 November 1948. She lived in several countries and continents during her early life, including France, Germany, the United States and parts of Africa, before settling in Mexico, where she lived for over thirty years. She first worked as a dancer and performer. She danced in some of the world's most famous nightclubs, including the Moulin Rouge, the Casino de Paris and Le Lido. She became fluent in Spanish, Italian and French through her career and travels.

Voltaire made her big screen debut after settling in Mexico in the 1971 film Un Quijote sin mancha, opposite Mario Moreno, who was better known as Cantinflas. Voltaire officially joined the National Association of Actors (ANDA), the Mexican actors guild, in February 1979, where she held membership number 19216. Voltaire appeared opposite a number of well known Mexican and international actors including Arnold Schwarzenegger, Queta Carrasco, Mauricio Garcés, Sharon Stone, Óscar Chávez, Silvia Pinal, Patrick Stewart, Roberto Gómez Bolaños and Susana Dosamantes. In the 1990s and 2000s, Voltaire became known as one of Mexico's famed telenovela stars, but continued to work in films. She won a MTV Latinoamérica award in the category "Most bizarre sex scene" in 2005 for a scene in the film Matando Cabos with actor Silverio Palacios. She also worked as an image consultant during the later years of her career.

Voltaire's last role in television was on the Mexican telenovela Palabra de Mujer, in which she played the character of Flora Navarro. Her last stage role was in the Mexican staging of the musical Dirty Rotten Scoundrels, renamed Una Eva y dos patanes, opposite actors Alessandra Rosaldo and Eugenio Derbez.

Jacqueline Voltaire died at a hospital in Mexico City on 8 April 2008 of melanoma (a most dangerous type of skin cancer) at the age of 59. Her remains were cremated on 10 April 2008.

== Telenovelas ==
- Palabra de Mujer (2008)
- Amor sin maquillaje (2007)
- Muchachitas como tú (2007)
- Destilando amor (2007)
- Contra viento y marea
- La verdad oculta (2006)
- Apuesta por un amor (2005)
- Rebelde (2004)
- Corazones al límite (2004)
- Amor Real (2003)
- Clase 406 (2002)
- ¡Vivan los Niños! (2002-2003)
- Salomé (2002)
- Por un beso (2000)
- DKDA: Sueños de juventud (2000)
- Tres mujeres (1999)
- El privilegio de amar (1999)
- Preciosa (1998)
- Agujetas de color de rosa (1994)
- Alcanzar una estrella (1990)
- Simplemente María (1989)

== Filmography ==
- Under the Same Moon (2007)
- Morirse está en hebreo (2005)
- Romancing the Bride (2005)
- Matando Cabos (2004)
- Conejo en la luna (2004)
- Men with Guns (1997)
- The Arrival (1996)
- Soy hombre y que (1993)
- La tumba del Atlántico (1992)
- The Taking of Beverly Hills
- Dune (1984)
- Peor que los buitres (1974)
- Debieron ahorcarlos antes (1974)
- Capulina contra las momias (1973)
- La montaña sagrada (Holly Mountain) (1973)
- Masajista de señoras (1973)
- Vanessa (1972)
- El rey de Acapulco (1972)
- Espérame en Siberia vida mía (1971)
- Los desalmados (1971)
- Un Quijote sin mancha (1971)
- Un amante anda suelto (1970)
- La Hermana Trinquete (1970)
- Flor de durazno (1970)
- Un Quijote sin mancha (1969)
