= Telemiami =

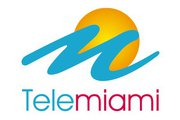
- Country: United States
- Broadcast area: Miami/Fort Lauderdale, Florida/West Palm Beach
- Headquarters: Miami, Florida

Programming
- Language: Spanish

Links
- Website: http://www.telemiami.com

Telemiami is a cable television station broadcasting from Miami, Florida. Since its official launch over 30 years ago, it has created a Spanish-language television alternative for South Florida's Hispanic audiences. The station transmits 24 hours a day on local cable systems and was recently launched on AT&T’s U-verse throughout the state of Florida on channel 20.

== Programming ==
The station’s programming currently focuses on the needs and interests of the local Hispanic community present in South Florida. Telemiami broadcasts original, locally produced news and entertainment shows along with several top-rated programs from Spain’s award-winning Antena 3 International network. The former mentioned, leader in international programming, provides Telemiami with access to all of its programming.

Telemiami also gives its viewers the option to speak with the hosts, presenters, newscasters and guests in its broadcast. In some of the station’s live segments, the audience is invited to call the studio where they will be able to question the invited experts, candidates for public office, etc., and to express their opinions freely on the issues under discussion.

Some of the station’s most watched shows include “¿Dónde Estás Corazón?” (Where Are You Darling?), “El Diario” (a daily talk show), and “El Informativo” (TV News).

== Channels ==
- AT&T U-verse // South Florida (Miami-Dade, Broward, Monroe, Palm Beach) 20
- AT&T U-verse // Central Florida (Orlando) 20
- AT&T U-verse // North Florida (Jacksonville) 20
- Comcast Miami // City of Miami / Opalocka 80
- Comcast North // North Miami Beach, Aventura, Northeast and Northwest Dade 80
- Comcast South Dade // Pinecrest, South Miami 80
- Comcast West // Sweetwater, Coral Gables, Hialeah, Miami Springs 80
- Comcast Broward // All Broward County 80
- Comcast // South Dade, Doral, Homestead, Key Biscayne, Florida City 80
- Atlantic Broadband // Miami Beach, Bal Harbour Islands, South Miami 82
- Comcast Monroe // Monroe County 80

== Florida's Hispanic Market ==
The Hispanic market in Florida is significant in size and is also rapidly growing. There are approximately 6.9 million Hispanics living in Florida, making up the largest minority group (which can be referred to as a minority-majority). The percentage of total Hispanic presence in South Florida is even more impressive: of the 2,373,297 people living in Miami-Dade County, 63% are Hispanic or Latino. This has created a powerful, growing market for television stations like Telemiami, which are concentrating on the Hispanic audience's interests.

== Audience and Growth ==
Telemiami's audience has grown with the station, which is now broadcasting to over 1,500,000 households and over 3,750,000 viewers throughout Florida. The station's audience is primarily Hispanic, between the ages of 25–75.
