= Eva Norvind =

Mexican actress, writer and filmmaker

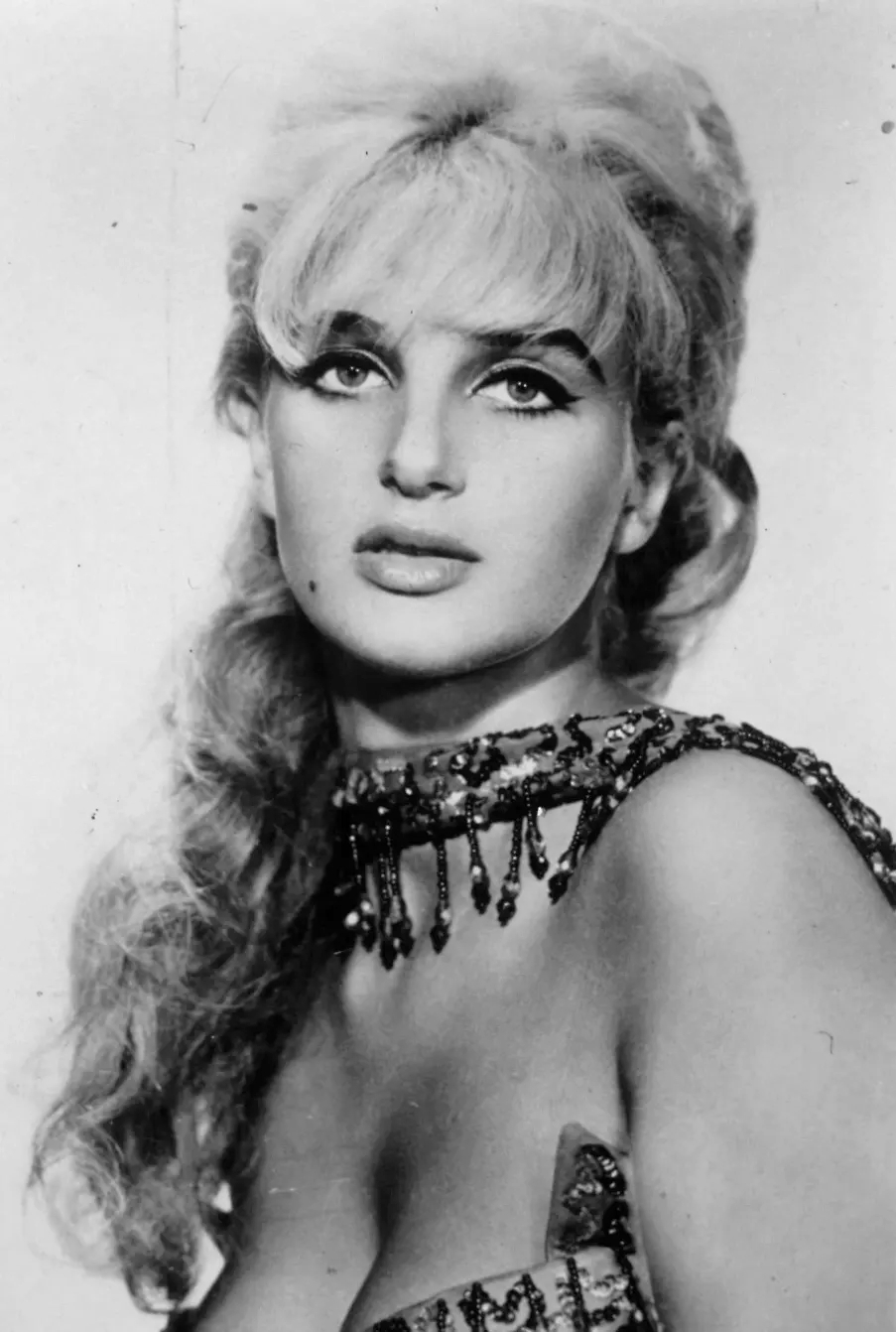
- Eva Norvind in 1965
- Born: Eva Johanne Chegodayeva Sakonsky; May 7, 1944; Trondheim, Norway
- Died: May 14, 2006 (aged 62); Zipolite, Oaxaca, Mexico
- Occupations: Actress, writer, documentary producer, director, sex therapist, dominatrix
- Years active: 1961–1968 (actress); 1961–2006 (writer, producer, director)
- Children: Nailea Norvind

Eva Norvind (born Eva Johanne Chegodayeva Sakonsky; May 7, 1944 – May 14, 2006) was a Norwegian-born Mexican actress, writer, documentary producer, director, sex therapist, and dominatrix.

== Early life ==
Norvind was the daughter of Russian prince Paul Vernstad née Chegodayef Sakonsky and Finnish sculptor Johanna Kajanus, who won the bronze medal for sculpture at the Exposition Internationale des Arts et Techniques dans la Vie Moderne (1937). She is sister to pop musician Georg Kajanus. Norvind, her mother and her brother moved to France when Norvind was 15 years old.

== Career ==
The following year she won the second prize in the beauty contest at the Cannes Film Festival which enabled her to win a minor role in the film Saint Tropez Blues. She then joined the cast of the Folies Bergère and changed her stage name to Eva Norvind. She also appeared in A School for Scandal at the Comédie-Française.

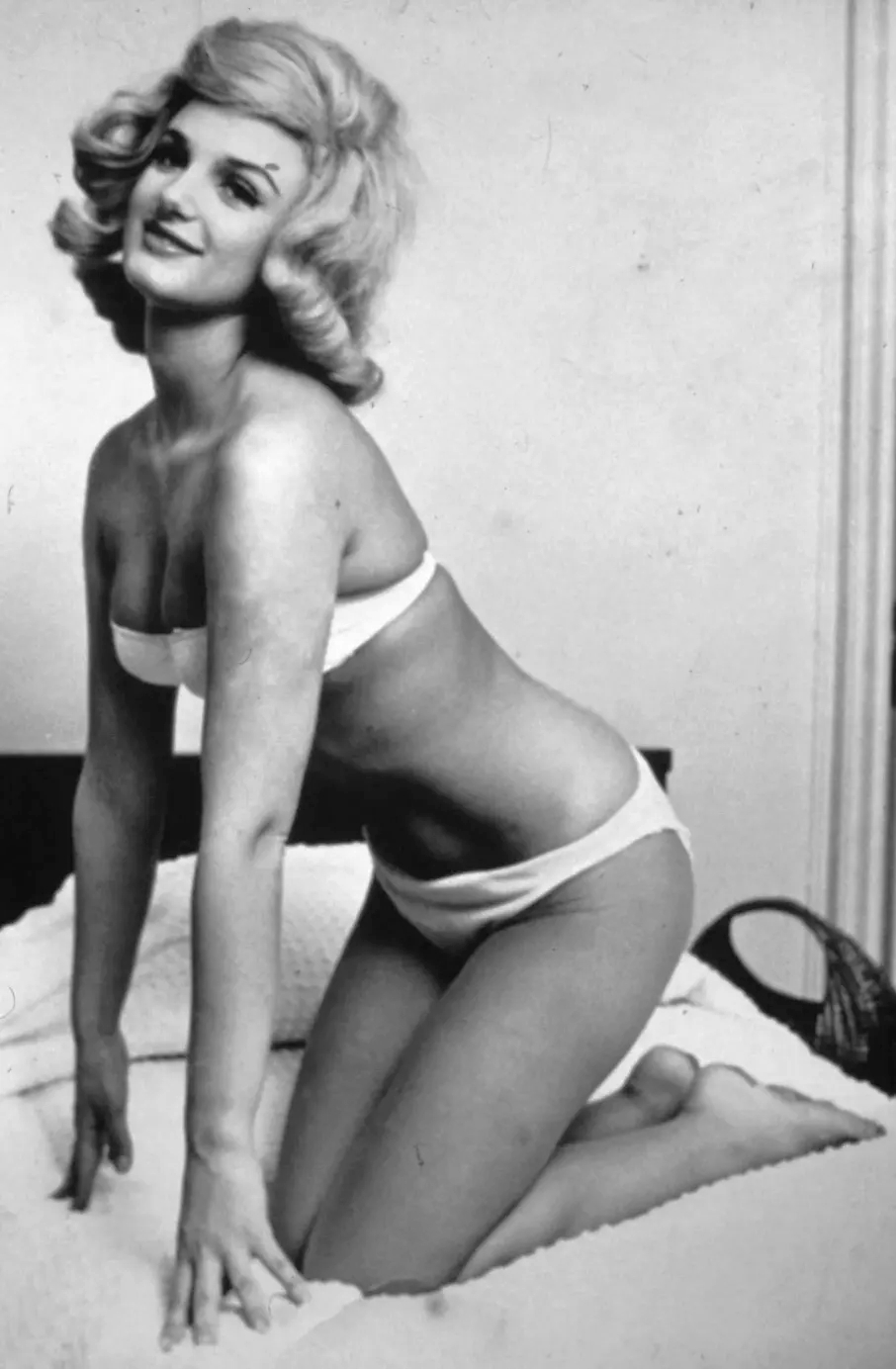
Eva Norvind in 1963

In 1962, Norvind moved to Canada and then to New York City, where at the age of 18 she worked as a Playboy Bunny and a Can-Can dancer. She finished high school in 1964 and then moved to Mexico City to study Spanish when she was recruited as an actress. She made seven films in Mexico, her last one being Báñame mi amor in 1968.

Norvind was the object of controversy in Mexico, when on the highly censored national television she spoke in defense of birth control. The government of Mexico then asked her to leave the country within 24 hours but with the help of the National Association of Actors she was able to stay in the country, although she was forbidden from appearing on television for one year. She performed in two plays, En el closet, no and Machiavelli's La mandragola (The Mandrake).

In 1968, she became a photographer covering fashion and celebrity news - traveling to Paris and New York City. She also wrote film articles and worked on distribution of Mexican films to Scandinavia and vice versa.

In 1970, Norvind gave birth to her daughter Nailea Norvind in Mexico City and returned to New York City in 1980 to study film at New York University (NYU), graduating in 1982 with a Bachelor in Fine Arts degree. In 1985, she became interested in erotic power exchange and two years later founded Taurel Associates, an umbrella company for counselling, erotic role play and video production for health related services. She gave lectures at national conferences worldwide, to both health professionals and lay audiences. In 1996, she obtained her master's degree in Human Sexuality from NYU. The following year, a movie about her life entitled Didn't Do It For Love was made by German filmmaker Monika Treut. She appeared in that film as well as in the 1999 film Tops & Bottoms.

In 1999, John McTiernan hired Norvind to coach Rene Russo for her assertive sexual image in The Thomas Crown Affair for which she got screen credit. Norvind also pursued graduate studies in Forensic Psychology at John Jay College of Criminal Justice. In 2003, she provided sexual consultation for the film Distress.

== Death ==
Norvind died on 14 May 2006, drowned in the waters off the beaches of Zipolite, in Oaxaca, Mexico. At the time of her death, she was writing, directing and producing a documentary about severely disabled Mexican actor and musician José Flores, entitled Born Without. In March 2007, Born Without won Best International Documentary at the Festival Internacional de Cine Contemporaneo de la Ciudad De Mexico (FICCO), Best Documentary Feature at the Vancouver International Film Festival 2008 and the Audience Award for Best International Feature at the 2009 LA Film Festival.

== Plays ==
- La Mandragola (The Mandrake)
- En el Closet, no

== Films ==
- Saint Tropez Blues (1961) as a German Tourist
- Pacto de sangre (1966) as Helen
- Esta noche no (1966) as Blond in Acapulco
- Juan Pistolas (1966)
- Nuestros buenos vecinos de Yucatán (1967)
- Santo el Enmascarado de Plata vs. la invasión de los marcianos (1967) as Selene
- Don Juan 67 (1967) as Helga
- Un yucateco honoris causa (1967)
- Báñame mi amor (1968) as Priestess
- Whipped (1998) as herself
- The City (2007) as herself
