= Mario Hernández (film director) =

Mexican film director and screenwriter

- Born: Mario Hernández Sepúlveda; 8 March 1936; Piedras Negras, Coahuila, Mexico
- Died: 9 June 2015 (aged 79); Cuernavaca, Morelos, Mexico
- Occupation(s): Film director, screenwriter

Mario Hernández Sepúlveda (March 8, 1936 - 9 June 2015) was a Mexican film director and screenwriter. He was best known for collaborating with Antonio Aguilar in films such as Valente Quintero (1973).
