= Eleazar García =

Mexican actor

Eleazar "El Chelelo" García
- Born: September 28, 1924; El Rancho de Las Guerras, Mier, Tamaulipas, Mexico
- Died: August 24, 1999 (aged 74); Monterrey, Nuevo León, Mexico
- Occupation: Actor

Eleazar García Sáenz (September 28, 1924 – August 24, 1999), known as Chelelo, was a Mexican character actor, best remembered as Antonio Aguilar's comic sidekick. He was also one of the three main norteño comedian actors of Golden Age of Mexican cinema, alongside Eulalio González «Piporro» and Alejandro Reyna «Tío Plácido».

He died on 24 August 1999 after three years of struggle to recover from embolism. His son Eleazar Lorenzo García Gutiérrez (1957-2011) was known as Chelelo Jr.

== Selected filmography ==
- El revólver sangriento (1964)
- Viento negro (1965)
- Juan Pistolas (1966)
- Lauro Puñales (1969)
- El ojo de vidrio (1969)
- Vuelve el ojo de vidrio (1970)
- Valente Quintero (1973)
- Nobleza Ranchera (1974)
- Contrabando y Traicion (alternative title, Camelia la Texana) 1977
- El miedo no anda en burro (1976)
- El rey de oro (1982)
- El Traficante (1983)
- El Vengador del 30-06 (1983)
- Todos Eran Valientes (1983)
- Los Peseros (1984)
- El Traficante 2 (1984)
- La Muerte Cruzó el Río Bravo (1984)
- La Cárcel De Laredo (1985)
