= Gilda Mirós =

American actress and producer (born 1938)

- Born: September 20, 1938 (age 87); Santurce, Puerto Rico
- Occupations: Journalist, radio and television producer, author and entertainer

Gilda Mirós (born September 20, 1938, in Santurce, Puerto Rico) is an American actress, radio and television producer, and author, of Puerto Rican descent. As a theater and film actress, Mirós has worked in the US, Mexico, and Puerto Rico. She became one of the first Latina journalists on television when she moved from film to journalism and was one of the first to appear pregnant on television. Her documentaries include works on the Viet Nam War and New York's Riker’s Island prison. She has published at least ten books and audiobooks, including works on Latin American culture. In 2020, she received a Lifetime Achievement Award from the National Association of Hispanic Journalists (NAHJ)

== Early life and education ==
Carmen Gilda Santiago Díaz was born on September 20, 1938 in Santurce, Puerto Rico. In 1946, she moved with her mother and stepfather to New York City, where she lived in The Bronx. She grew up bilingual in Spanish and English.

While studying painting at university, Mirós saw an advertisement for an acting academy in Mexico. In 1957, she and her mother went to an audition at the Asociación Nacional de Actores, ANDA, in Mexico City. Mirós was accepted and began to study acting, diction, and the history of the theater at age 18.

== Career ==
Mirós' first work in Mexican television was as a model, working with Agustín Lara and Libertad Lamarque. She went on to work in film, soap operas, theater, and television in Mexico, Puerto Rico, and NYC. She appeared in films such as La Vendedora de Amor, 1964.

In 1971, Mirós traveled to Vietnam with the USO as a performer in “Puerto Rico Sings”. She also worked as a correspondent on a documentary, visiting military camps such as Danang to interview soldiers about their experiences. She received awards for this work from the Department of Defense and was made an honorary member of the National Congress of Puerto Rican Veterans (Congreso National de Veteranos Puertorriqueno).

She became a host and producer of remote radio/TV specials in Latin America, a broadcaster, narrator, actress, and columnist. Mirós has worked with radio and television stations such as WADO, WJIT, and WBNX-AM (later WKDM) in New York; WXTV, channel 41 (Univision); and WNJU, channel 47 (Telemundo) in the NY, NJ, and CT areas. Mirós hosted the first daily radio program to be broadcast live simultaneously in New York and Los Angeles, from the Spanish Broadcasting System (SBS) FM 92 in Miami. Mirós' program "Amorosamente" aired on WWFE, Telemundo and Telemiami Cable in Miami.

Mirós produces "Latin Icons of the Past and Present," a cable/streaming program in NYC, and is part of the "Performing Arts Legacy Project". Her oral history (in English) is available at the Center for Puerto Rican Studies at Hunter College-CUNY. Miros has received a Star on the Paseo del Parque Celia Cruz in Union City, New Jersey, and was the International Godmother (Madrina Internacional) of the Parada Cubana in New Jersey in 2017.

In the book Celia Cruz and Sonora Matancera (2003) and the audiobook My Best Radio Interviews (Mis Mejores Entrevistas de Radio) Mirós published recorded interviews with members of the Sonora Matancera orchestra from her decades of Spanish-language radio programs. They include Rogelio Martínez, co-founder and director; musician and singer Carlos Manuel Diaz; Celia Cruz, Bobby Capó, Leo Marini, Carlos Argentino, Celio Gonzalez, Nelson Pinedo, Carmen Delia Dipini, Yayo el Indio, Alberto Beltrán, Joe Quijano, Javier Vazquéz, Elliot Romero, and Calixto Leicea. Mirós produced and hosted the 65th Anniversary of the group, Sonora Matancera with Celia Cruz and co-stars at Carnegie Hall in 1989.

From September 15, 2023 – August 17, 2025, she was one of seven Latinas profiled in the Smithsonian Institution's National Museum of American History's exhibit "¡De última hora!: Latinas Report Breaking News."

== Awards and honors ==
- 2021, Best National Journalist of 2021, National College of Cuban Journalists in Exile, Miami, Florida
- 2020, Lifetime Achievement Award from the National Association of Hispanic Journalists (NAHJ)
- 2019, Hometown National Media Award, Alliance for Community Media
- Multiple Awards, Association of Latin Entertainment Critics of New York (ACE)
- Medal of Our Lady of Providence, Archdiocese of New York
- Star, Paseo del Parque Celia Cruz, Union City, New Jersey,
- 1972, Certificate of Appreciation, United States Department of Defense
- Honorary member, National Congress of Puerto Rican Veterans (Congreso National de Veteranos Puertorriqueno)

== Selected works ==
- El Preso Hispano y la Comunidad Penal
- Celia Cruz & Sonora Matancera (2003)
- A Portrait of Puerto Rico (2005)
- Hortense and Her Happy Ducklings (2006)
- Memorias De Los Espiritus y Mi Madre (2009)
- Spirit Messages To My Mother (2010)
- Mystical Wings/Alas Místicas (2011)
- In Touch With Mom in Spirit/En Contacto Con Mami en Espiritu
- De La Montaǹa Venimos – Ìconos Latinoamericanos (2017)
- Spoken word recording Poética (2023)
