= Alejandro Reyna =

Mexican actor

- Born: Alejandro Reyna; Torreón, Coahuila, Mexico
- Occupations: Actor and singer
- Years active: 1958–1982

Alejandro Reyna, known as "El Tío Plácido", was a Mexican character actor and singer. He usually appeared in films starring Antonio Aguilar. He was one of the three main norteño actors of Mexican cinema, alongside Eulalio González "Piporro" and Eleazar García "Chelelo".

Born in Torreón, Coahuila, Reyna sang norteña music in the group "El Tío Plácido con sus Sobrinos". He appeared in films for the first time in 1958 and left cinema in 1982. After many minor roles, Reyna was given a special billing in Caballo prieto azabache. He was mostly cast as one of Aguilar's sidekicks alongside Eleazar García "Chelelo". Such is the case in Lucio Vázquez and Lauro Puñales.

== Filmography ==
- El castillo de los monstruos (1958) as Licenciado (as Alejandro Reyna García)
- Ando volando bajo (1959)
- Me gustan valentones! (1959)
- Thirst for Love (1959)
- Dos fantasmas y una muchacha (1959)
- Calibre 44 (1960) (uncredited)
- Conquistador de la luna (1960) (as Alejandro Reina García)
- El padre Pistolas (1961) (as Alejandro Reyna García)
- Escuela de valientes (1961) (as Alejandro Reyna G.)
- Pilotos de la muerte (1962) (as Alejandro Reyna García)
- Cazadores de asesinos (1962) (as Alejandro Reyna G.)
- Camino de la horca (1962)
- El amor llegó a Jalisco (1963) (as Reyna García)
- México de mi corazón (Dos mexicanas en México) (1964)
- Héroe a la fuerza (1964) (as Alejandro Reyna 'Tío Plácido')
- Cuando el diablo sopla (1966) (as Reyna García)
- Caballo prieto azabache (aka La tumba de Villa) (1968) as Plácido López (as Alejandro Reyna 'Tío Plácido')
- Lucio Vázquez (1968) as Ventura
- Valentín de la Sierra (1968) as Revolucionario
- El caballo Bayo (1969)
- Lauro Puñales (1969) (as Alejandro Reyna 'Tío Plácido')
- El ojo de vidrio (1969)
- Vuelve el ojo de vidrio (1970) (as Alejandro Reyna 'Tío Plácido')
- Pancho Tequila (1970) (as Reyna 'Tio Plácido', Alejandro)
- La captura de Gabino Barrera (1970) as Plácido
- Emiliano Zapata (1970)
- El quelite (1970) as Rucasio Ontiveros
- Santo and the Vengeance of the Mummy (1971) as Plácido (as Tío Plácido)
- Valente Quintero (1973) as Doctor
- La yegua colorada (1973) (as Alejandro 'Tío Plácido' Reyna)
- La muerte de Pancho Villa (1974)
- Simón Blanco (1975) as Celestino
- La muerte de un gallero (1977) (as Alejandro Reyna García 'Tío Plácido')
- México Norte (1979)
- Sin fortuna (1980) (as Tío Plácido)
- El ánima de Sayula (1982) (as Tío Plácido)
