= El caballo bayo =

1966 film

El caballo bayo (English: The Bay Horse) is a 1966 Mexican Western drama film starring Antonio Aguilar and Maricruz Olivier.
