= Valente Quintero =

- Born: 1887; Bamopa, Badiraguato Municipality, Sinaloa
- Died: March 19, 1922 (aged 34-35); Babunica, Badiraguato Municipality, Sinaloa
- Burial place: Bamopa
- Military career
- Allegiance: State of Sinaloa, Mexico
- Rank: Sub-lieutenant

Valente Quintero (1887 – March 19, 1922) was a Mexican sub-lieutenant who is remembered today for his duel against Martín Elenes on March 19, 1922. The event resulted in the death of both men, and was popularized in song as a corrido written by Rosendo Monzón, and as a popular 1973 movie adapted from Monzón's corrido.

He participated in the maderistas forces until his triumph in Sinaloa. He was born in 1887, in the hamlet of Bamopa, in the Badiraguato Municipality. Valente's widow, Martina Ortiz de Quintero, was interviewed by Francisco Gil Leyva about the events that took place on that day.

== In popular culture ==
Valente Quintero's life was dramatized in music and film. Songwriter Rosendo Monzón wrote the lyrics of Quintero's last moments and his death, and Antonio Aguilar portrayed him in the film Valente Quintero, which he produced and co-wrote. Singer-actress Lucha Villa has also sung the corrido of Valente Quintero.
