= Alfredo Zacarías =

Mexican screenwriter and film producer

- Born: Alfredo Héctor Zacarías Bustos; November 21, 1941 (age 84); Mexico City, Mexico
- Occupations: Screenwriter, film producer, film director, songwriter

Alfredo Héctor Zacarías Bustos (born November 21, 1941) is a Mexican screenwriter, film producer, film director, and songwriter. He is the son of director Miguel Zacarías.

== Selected filmography ==
- Cada quién su lucha (1966)
- Los cuatro Juanes (1966)
- Dos pintores pintorescos (1967)
- Capulina Speedy González (1970)
- Jesús, nuestro Señor (1971)
- El bueno para nada (1973)
- Capulina contra las momias (1973)
- Demonoid (1981)
- The Pearl (2001)
