= René Cardona Jr. =

Mexican filmmaker and actor (1939-2003)

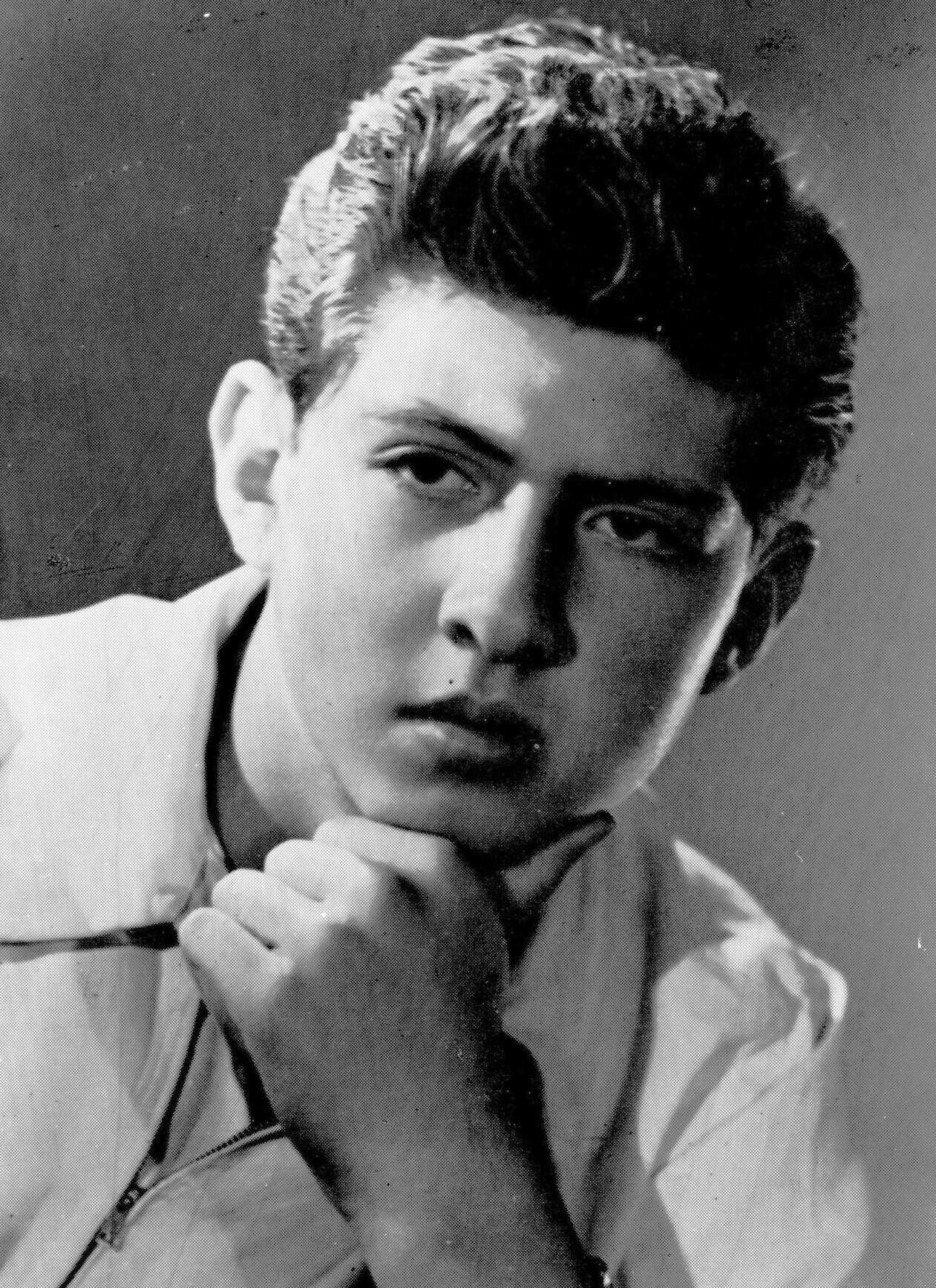
- René Cardona in 1954
- Born: René Cardona Zacarías; 11 May 1939; Mexico City, Mexico
- Died: 5 February 2003 (aged 63); Mexico City, Mexico
- Occupations: Film director, actor
- Children: 2
- Father: René Cardona
- Relatives: Miguel Zacarías (uncle); Alfredo Zacarías (cousin); Karen Zacarias (niece)

René Cardona Zacarías (11 May 1939 – 5 February 2003) was a Mexican film director, screenwriter, producer, and actor. He was the son of actor and filmmaker René Cardona. Internationally, he is known for his various B movies and exploitation films produced during the 70's and 80's.

== Life and career ==
The son of actor/director René Cardona and Julieta Zacarías (the sister of director Miguel Zacarías), Cardona began by acting in his father's films and then took over his father's craft in the mid-1960s, directing, writing, and producing over 100 films over the years. He enjoyed some notoriety and success, particularly in the late 1970s, as a result of his Jaws-inspired film Tintorera (1977), which became a cult classic.

He capitalized on the spirit of cooperation between the Mexican, Spanish, and Italian film industries prevalent in the late 1970s and was able to make a spate of comparatively large-budget exploitation films with professional international casts and crews. He also managed to hire several once-popular American actors during this period, such as Joseph Cotten, John Huston, Gene Barry, Stuart Whitman, John Ireland, Arthur Kennedy, and Lionel Stander to help boost international ticket sales. Most of these actors were fresh from similar guest appearances in Italian films of the same period.

This brief period of international success waned in the mid-1980s, and he went back to Spanish-language Mexican "B-films" for the next few decades up to his death. He commonly worked with either Mexican leading man Hugo Stiglitz or Andrés García, who both briefly enjoyed some international fame while regulars in Cardona's films.

He dabbled in a variety of genres, touching everything from disaster movies such as Cyclone (1978) to horror films (Night of a Thousand Cats in 1972), sci-fi films (The Bermuda Triangle in 1978), and even sensational dramas of historic events as the Jonestown Massacre, as retold as Guyana: Crime of the Century (1979).

Cardona Jr. is particularly infamous for his predilection for cruelty towards animals while filming. A live shark was killed during the filming of Tintorera, a cat was thrown over a wall in Night of a Thousand Cats, and live birds were thrown through windows to film the bird attack scenes in Beaks: The Movie (1987).

== Personal life ==
Cardona had two children, including actor/director René Cardona III (1962-2021), who appeared in some of his father's films under the stage name 'Al Coster'.

=== Death ===
A lifelong resident of Mexico City, Cardona died there aged 63, on February 5, 2003.

== Partial filmography ==
- Marked Cards (1948)
- Buenos días Acapulco (1963)
- Juan Pistolas (1966)
- Dos pintores pintorescos (1967)
- Un par de robachicos (1967)
- El ojo de vidrio (1969)
- Vuelve el ojo de vidrio (1970)
- Blood Feast (1972)
- Zindy the Swamp Boy (1973)
- El valle de los miserables (1975)
- Tintorera (1977)
- King of the Gorillas (1977)
- The Bermuda Triangle (1978)
- Cyclone (1978)
- Guyana: Crime of the Century (1979)
- Spicy Chile (1983)
- Fiebre de amor (1985)
- Treasure of the Amazon (1985)
- Escápate conmigo (1987)
- Beaks: The Movie (1987)
- Pero sigo siendo el rey (1988)
- Deliciosa Sinvergüenza (1990)
- Historias y testigos: ¡Ni una muerta más! (TV film, 2004)
