= Capulina Speedy González =

1970 film

- Theatrical release lobby card
- Directed by: Alfredo Zacarías
- Written by: Alfredo Zacarías
- Produced by: Alfredo Zacarías
- Starring: Gaspar Henaine «Capulina» Leonorilda Ochoa
- Cinematography: Javier Cruz
- Edited by: Federico Landeros
- Music by: Ernesto Cortázar II
- Production companies: Estudios América, S.A.
- Release date: August 13, 1970 (Mexico)
- Running time: 93 minutes
- Country: Mexico
- Language: Spanish

Capulina Speedy González is a 1970 Mexican western-comedy film produced, written and directed by Alfredo Zacarías, and starring Gaspar Henaine «Capulina» and Leonorilda Ochoa. It is a parody of Speedy Gonzales, from Looney Tunes.

The film revolves around the hilarious mishaps of a Mexican courier working for an American post office who is framed by two U.S. army deserters-turned-bandits.

== Cast ==
- Gaspar Henaine as Capulina Espiridión González
- Leonorilda Ochoa as Rosita Smith
- Xavier Loyá as Timothy
- Jorge Rado as Sheriff
- John Kelly as Sergeant
- Víctor Alcocer as Priest
- Nathanael León as Bartender
- Conjunto "Los Tonchis" as Musician
- Jorge Casanova as Mailman
- Julián de Meriche as Judge
- Juan Garza as Sheriff's assistant
- Jesús Gómez as Courier
- Víctor Almazán as Townsman
