= Caballo prieto azabache =

- Theatrical release poster
- Directed by: René Cardona
- Screenplay by: René Cardona; Rafael García Travesi
- Story by: Rafael García Travesi
- Based on: "El prieto azabache" by José Albarrán
- Starring: Antonio Aguilar; Flor Silvestre
- Cinematography: Fernando Colín
- Edited by: Federico Landeros
- Music by: Enrico C. Cabiati
- Production company: Estudios América
- Distributed by: Cinematográfica Filmex
- Release date: February 8, 1968 (Mexico)
- Running time: 85 minutes
- Country: Mexico
- Language: Spanish

Caballo prieto azabache (La tumba de Villa) is a 1968 Mexican historical drama film written and directed by René Cardona, and starring Antonio Aguilar and Flor Silvestre. This film marked the acting debut of Raúl "Chato" Padilla, playing Pancho Villa, and later better known for portraying Jaimito, el cartero in the 1970s sitcom El Chavo del Ocho.

It focuses on a horse breeder named Jesús who is set on buying a horse known as "Caballo prieto" (dark horse) and pursuing a relationship with a singer named Genoveva Alarios. Eventually, he and Genoveva are recruited as spies for the revolutionary leader Pancho Villa. The film was successful at the box office and stayed in theaters for a surprising nine weeks.

== Cast ==
DVD release cover

- Antonio Aguilar as Jesús Aguilar
- Flor Silvestre as Genoveva Larios
- Jaime Fernández as Rodolfo Fierro
- Jorge Russek as El Coyote
- Jessica Munguía as Martina Arango
- Guillermo Rivas as Daniel
- Tito Novaro as Colonel Jiménez
- José Luis Moreno as Hipólito Arango
- José Eduardo Pérez as Juan
- Pascual García Peña as Old Townsman
- Victorio Blanco as General Velasco
- Víctor Velázquez as Emeterio Leyva
- José Luis Fernández as Jacinto
- Alejandro Reyna «Tío Plácido» as Plácido López
- Raúl «Chato» Padilla as Pancho Villa (uncredited)
- Francisco Salinas Cortes as Background Actor (uncredited)
