= El albañil =

1975 Mexican comedy film

- Directed by: José Estrada
- Written by: José Estrada
- Produced by: Gregorio Walerstein
- Starring: Vicente Fernández; Manoella Torres
- Cinematography: Fernando Colín
- Edited by: Maximino Sánchez Molina
- Music by: Gilberto Parra
- Color process: Technicolor
- Production companies: Estudios América; Cima Films
- Release date: 30 October 1975
- Running time: 97 minutes
- Country: Mexico
- Language: Spanish

El albañil (English: The Bricklayer) is a 1975 Mexican comedy film directed by José Estrada and starring Vicente Fernández, Manoella Torres

== Cast ==
- Vicente Fernández as Reinaldo
- Manoella Torres as Manuela Torres
- Luis Manuel Pelayo as Idem
- Dacia González as Enedina
- Alberto Rojas as El Cáncer o El Cancerbero
- Graciela Lara as Mapy
- Orville Miller as Juan Carlos Marotti
- Leandro Martínez
- Agustín Silva
- Juan Ángel Martínez as El Perro, albañil
- Raúl «Chato» Padilla as Juez
- Liza Willert
- Jorge Fegán as Bermúdez, albañil
- Rafael Valdés as Ingeniero Armando de la Rosa
- Florencio Castelló as Don Agri
- Alfredo Gutiérrez as Maestro Nava
- Juan Garza as Albañil
- Hortensia Santoveña as Monja enfermera
- Arsenio Campos as El del Diners
- Manuel Dondé as Velador

== Bibliography ==
- Berg, Charles Ramírez (5 July 2010). Cinema of Solitude: A Critical Study of Mexican Film, 1967-1983. University of Texas Press. ISBN 978-0-292-79192-3.
