= Tayahua, Zacatecas =

Coordinates: 22.083°N 102.867°W

Tayahua is a small provincial town in the central Mexican state of Zacatecas. The town has less than 2,193 inhabitants. Tayahua is a municipality of the city Villanueva. It is located south of Villanueva and north of the City Tabasco. This town was once inhabited by the famous actor/singer, Antonio Aguilar. before he built his own ranch "El Soyate" approximately 6km north of Tayahua off the main highway road. Antonio Aguilar and family once lived in La Hacienda by the Catholic Church in Tayahua.

== Climate ==
Climate data for Tayahua (1951–2010)
Month	Jan	Feb	Mar	Apr	May	Jun	Jul	Aug	Sep	Oct	Nov	Dec	Year
Record high °C (°F)	33.0 (91.4)	39.0 (102.2)	38.0 (100.4)	38.0 (100.4)	41.0 (105.8)	40.0 (104.0)	38.0 (100.4)	35.0 (95.0)	37.0 (98.6)	38.0 (100.4)	37.0 (98.6)	35.0 (95.0)	41.0 (105.8)
Mean daily maximum °C (°F)	24.7 (76.5)	26.6 (79.9)	29.4 (84.9)	31.3 (88.3)	33.5 (92.3)	32.2 (90.0)	29.4 (84.9)	29.2 (84.6)	28.8 (83.8)	28.6 (83.5)	27.1 (80.8)	25.0 (77.0)	28.8 (83.8)
Daily mean °C (°F)	14.4 (57.9)	15.9 (60.6)	18.3 (64.9)	20.6 (69.1)	23.3 (73.9)	23.7 (74.7)	21.9 (71.4)	21.7 (71.1)	21.2 (70.2)	19.7 (67.5)	16.9 (62.4)	15.1 (59.2)	19.4 (66.9)
Mean daily minimum °C (°F)	4.2 (39.6)	5.1 (41.2)	7.1 (44.8)	9.8 (49.6)	13.0 (55.4)	15.3 (59.5)	14.4 (57.9)	14.2 (57.6)	13.7 (56.7)	10.8 (51.4)	6.7 (44.1)	5.2 (41.4)	10.0 (50.0)
Record low °C (°F)	−4.0 (24.8)	−6.0 (21.2)	−3.0 (26.6)	1.0 (33.8)	4.0 (39.2)	6.0 (42.8)	7.5 (45.5)	8.0 (46.4)	4.0 (39.2)	2.0 (35.6)	−5.0 (23.0)	−3.5 (25.7)	−6.0 (21.2)
Average precipitation mm (inches)	18.0 (0.71)	8.0 (0.31)	3.6 (0.14)	4.0 (0.16)	14.3 (0.56)	81.9 (3.22)	139.3 (5.48)	126.8 (4.99)	92.4 (3.64)	36.0 (1.42)	10.6 (0.42)	12.8 (0.50)	547.7 (21.56)
Average precipitation days (≥ 0.1 mm)	2.2	1.1	0.6	0.7	2.3	7.9	12.5	11.9	9.7	4.2	1.4	2.0	56.5
Source: Servicio Meteorologico Nacional
