= Lauro Puñales =

- Directed by: René Cardona
- Written by: Rafael García Travesi
- Produced by: Gregorio Walerstein
- Starring: Antonio Aguilar; Flor Silvestre; Alma Delia Fuentes; Elsa Cárdenas
- Cinematography: Raúl Domínguez
- Edited by: Federico Landeros
- Music by: Enrico C. Cabiati
- Production companies: Estudios América S.A. Cima Films S.A.
- Release dates: March 13, 1969 (Mexico City, Mexico)
- Running time: 87 minutes
- Country: Mexico
- Language: Spanish

Lauro Puñales (English: Lauro Daggers) is a 1969 historical drama film directed by René Cardona, and starring Antonio Aguilar, Flor Silvestre, Alma Delia Fuentes and Elsa Cárdenas.

== Plot ==
In Emiliano Zapata's hometown of Anenecuilco lives Lauro Puñales, a famous revolutionary leader and agrarian. The town's political boss and municipal president are confidants to the federals. The political boss urges the peasants to give him back the lands that they took from them, albeit Lauro defends the peasants and also promotes the revolutionary cause. He is in love with Rosenda, a widow and daughter of notable citizen Damián Rodríguez.

== Cast ==
- Antonio Aguilar – Lauro González
- Flor Silvestre – Rosenda Rodríguez
- Alma Delia Fuentes – Teresa Rodríguez
- Elsa Cárdenas – María Elena Rodríguez
- Carlos López Moctezuma – don Damián Rodríguez
- Eleazar García «Chelelo» – Juvencio (as Eleazar García 'Chelelo')
- Alejandro Reyna «Tío Plácido» – Albino (as Alejandro Reyna 'Tio Placido')
- Jaime Fernández – Emiliano Zapata
- Carlos Cortés – Capitan Luis Bermúdez
- Julián Pastor – Carlos Reyes
- Miguel Ángel Ferriz – General Bermúdez
- Guillermo Rivas – Saturnino López
- Jorge Russek – Coronel Villegas
- Arturo Martínez – don Leobardo Nochebuena
- Agustín Isunza – doctor
- Joaquín Martínez – Matías
- Manuel Garay
- René Barrera
