= Emiliano Zapata (film) =

- Directed by: Felipe Cazals
- Written by: Antonio Aguilar; Ricardo Garibay; Mario Hernández
- Produced by: Antonio Aguilar
- Starring: Antonio Aguilar, Jaime Fernández, Mario Almada, Patricia Aspíllaga, David Reynoso
- Edited by: Joaquín Ceballos; Rafael Ceballos
- Music by: Paul Sawtell; Bert Shefter
- Release date: 20 November 1970
- Running time: 120 minutes
- Country: Mexico
- Language: Spanish

Emiliano Zapata is a 1970 Mexican drama film directed by Felipe Cazals and written, produced, and starring Antonio Aguilar alongside Patricia Aspíllaga. It has been described as one of the first large-scale, expensive, and unconventional epics ever to be made in Mexico.

== Cast ==
- Antonio Aguilar as Emiliano Zapata
- Jaime Fernández as Montaño
- Mario Almada as Eufemio Zapata
- Patricia Aspíllaga as Josefa Espejo
- David Reynoso as Pancho Villa
- Jorge Arvizu as Francisco Madero

== Box office ==
After just over a month of release in Mexico, the film had grossed $480,000.

== Awards ==
Emiliano Zapata won Premio ACE Cinema awards for Film of the Year, Best Actor (Antonio Aguilar), and Best Director (Felipe Cazals).
