= Alberto Isaac =

Mexican film director

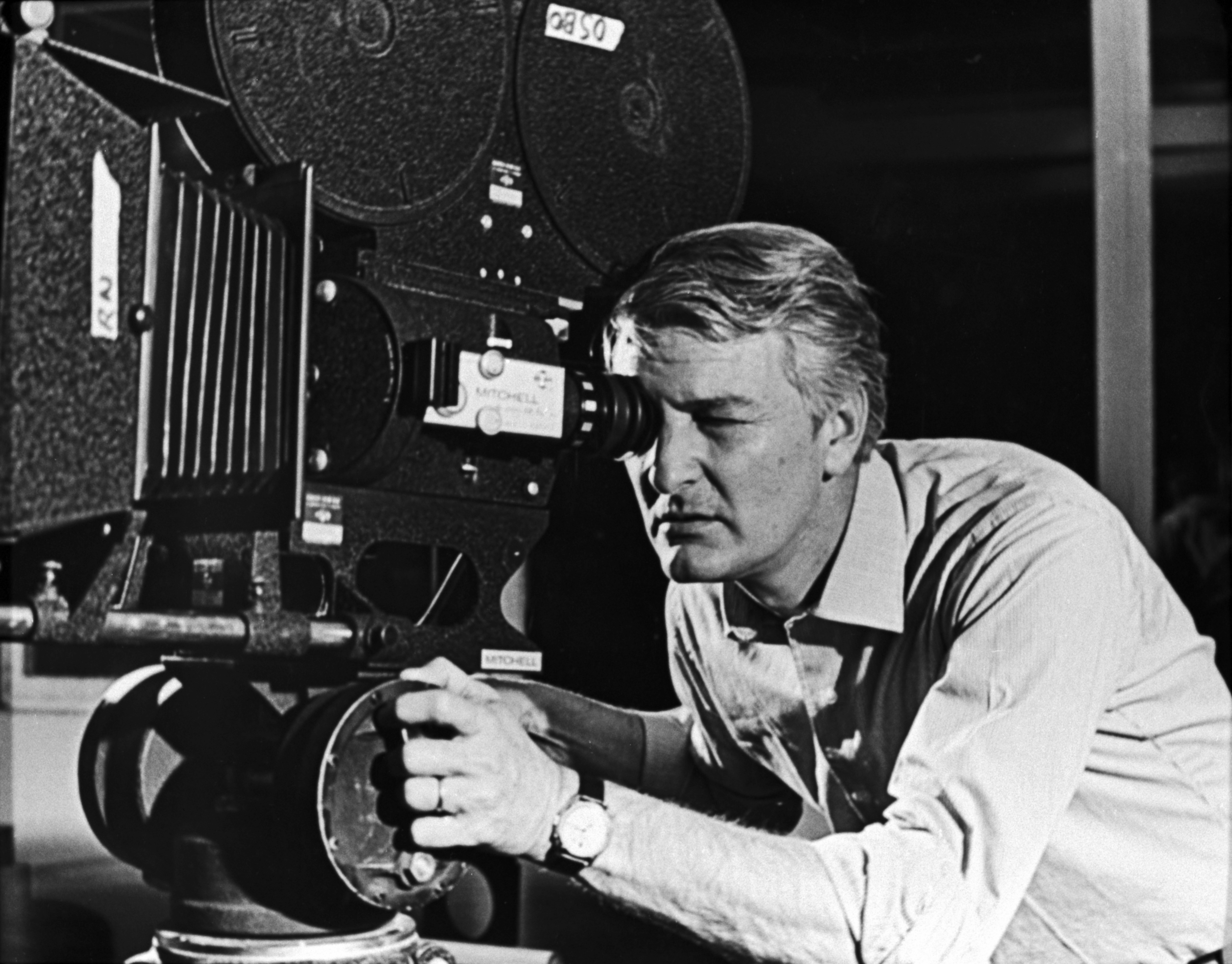

Personal information
- Full name: Alberto Isaac Ahumada
- Born: 18 March 1923 Mexico City, Mexico
- Died: 9 January 1998 (aged 74) Mexico City, Mexico
- Height: 1.85 m (6 ft 1 in)
- Weight: 71 kg (157 lb)

Sport
- Sport: Swimming
- Strokes: Freestyle
Medal record
Men's swimming
Representing Mexico
Pan American Games
Bronze medal – third place	1951 Buenos Aires	3 x 100 m medley

Alberto Isaac (18 March 1923 – 9 January 1998) was a Mexican freestyle swimmer and later a film director and screenwriter. He competed in the 1948 Summer Olympics and the 1952 Summer Olympics.

In 1969, he directed the documentary film The Olympics in Mexico which was nominated for an Academy Award for Best Documentary Feature. In 1980 he was a member of the jury at the 30th Berlin International Film Festival. In 1987, he was a member of the jury at the 15th Moscow International Film Festival.
