= Manuel Capetillo =

Mexican bullfighter and actor (1926–2009)

Manuel Antonio Capetillo Villaseñor (15 April 1926 – 5 May 2009) was a Mexican film actor, bullfighter, singer, and songwriter from Ixtlahuacán de los Membrillos, Jalisco.

On 5 May 2009, Capetillo died of respiratory insufficiency, in Chacala, Nayarit. The wake was held in Guadalajara, Jalisco, and he was buried in the capital. The news media said that the cause of his death was intoxication and a problem with ulcers, but the actor's son said that it was respiratory insufficiency.

== Selected filmography ==
- El revólver sangriento (1964)
- Alma llanera (1965)
- El ojo de vidrio (1969)
- El as de oros (1968)
