= Antonio Aguilar =

Mexican singer and actor (1919–2007)

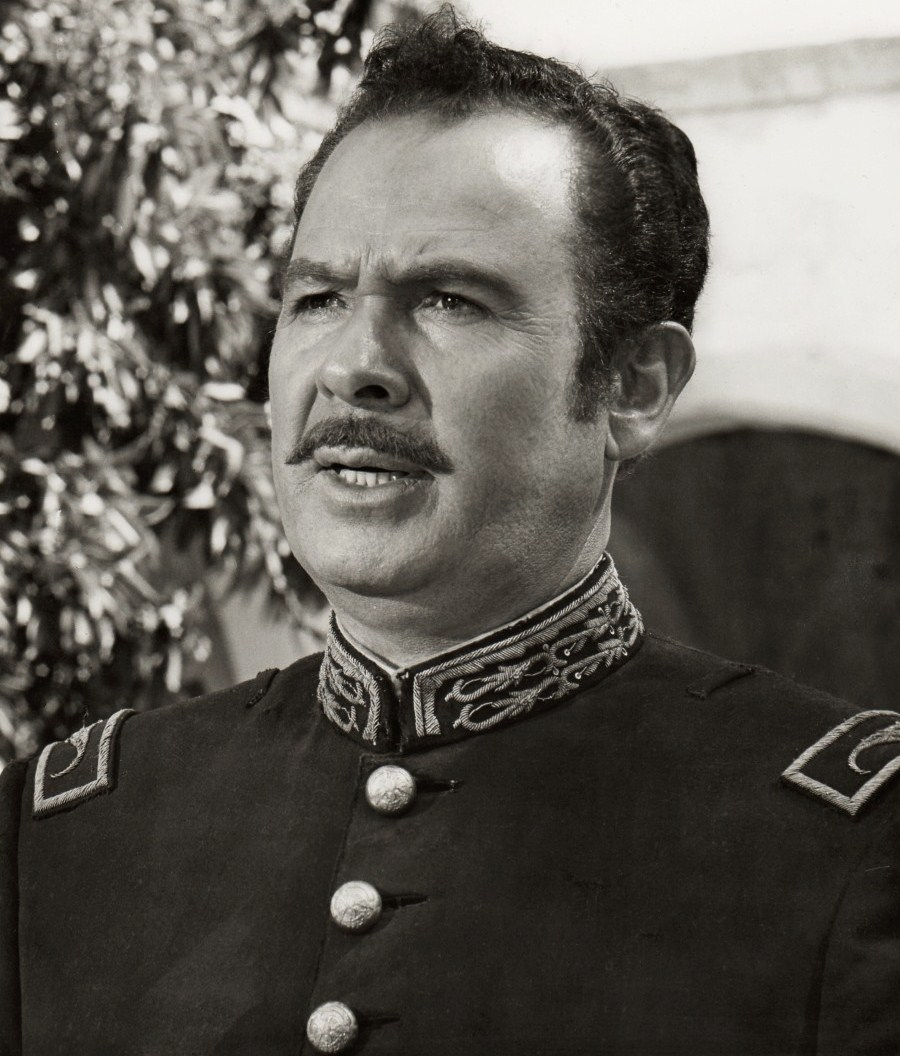
- Aguilar in The Undefeated (1969)
- Born: José Pascual Antonio Aguilar Márquez Barraza; 17 May 1919; Villanueva, Zacatecas, Mexico
- Died: 19 June 2007 (aged 88); Mexico City, Mexico
- Resting place: Cerro de San Cayetano, El Soyate, Zacatecas, Mexico
- Other names: El Charro de México; Tony Aguilar; Pascual Barraza; The Godfather of Banda Music
- Occupations: Singer, actor
- Years active: 1950–2005
- Spouses: Otilia Larrañaga; Flor Silvestre (m. 1959)
- Children: Antonio Aguilar Hijo; Pepe Aguilar
- Relatives: Emiliano Aguilar (grandson); Majo Aguilar (granddaughter); Ángela Aguilar (granddaughter); Leonardo Aguilar (grandson); Guadalupe Pineda (niece); Dalia Inés (stepdaughter); Francisco Rubiales (stepson); Marcela Rubiales (stepdaughter); La Prieta Linda (sister-in-law); Mary Jiménez (sister-in-law)
- Awards: Golden Ariel (1997)
- Musical career
- Genre: Regional Mexican
- Instrument: Vocals
- Label: Musart
- Website: antonioaguilaroficial.com

José Pascual Antonio Aguilar Márquez Barraza (17 May 1919 – 19 June 2007), known as Antonio Aguilar and accredited as Tony Aguilar, was a Mexican singer and actor. He recorded over 150 albums, which sold 25 million copies, and acted in more than 120 films. He was given the honorific nickname "El Charro de México" (Mexico's Horseman) because he is credited with popularizing the Mexican equestrian sport la charrería to international audiences.

Aguilar began his career singing on Mexican radio station XEW in 1950. That year, he signed a contract with Mexican independent label Musart Records and became one of its best-selling artists. He made his acting debut with Pedro Infante in the drama Un rincón cerca del cielo (1952). After appearing in gentleman roles in several films, he achieved popularity as a film star with his performance as lawman Mauricio Rosales in a series of seven films in the mid-1950s. His success increased with his tours throughout Latin America and his studio albums, which included Mexican folk songs (rancheras) and ballads (corridos). In the 1960s, he focused on producing and starring in films set in the Mexican Revolution. In 1970, he won Latin ACE Award for Best Actor for his portrayal of Emiliano Zapata in the 1970 epic film of the same name. He also portrayed Pancho Villa twice in film. In 1997, Aguilar was awarded the Golden Ariel for his "invaluable contribution and spreading of Mexican cinema". To this day, he has been the only Hispanic artist to sell out the Madison Square Garden of New York City for six consecutive nights in 1997.

His second wife was famous singer and actress Flor Silvestre. They had two sons, Antonio Aguilar Hijo, and Pepe Aguilar, who also became singers and actors. His family is known as "la dinastía Aguilar" (the Aguilar dynasty).

== Early life ==
Aguilar was born in Villanueva, Zacatecas, the son of Jesús Aguilar Aguilar and Ángela Márquez Barraza Valle, both of Villanueva.

== Career ==
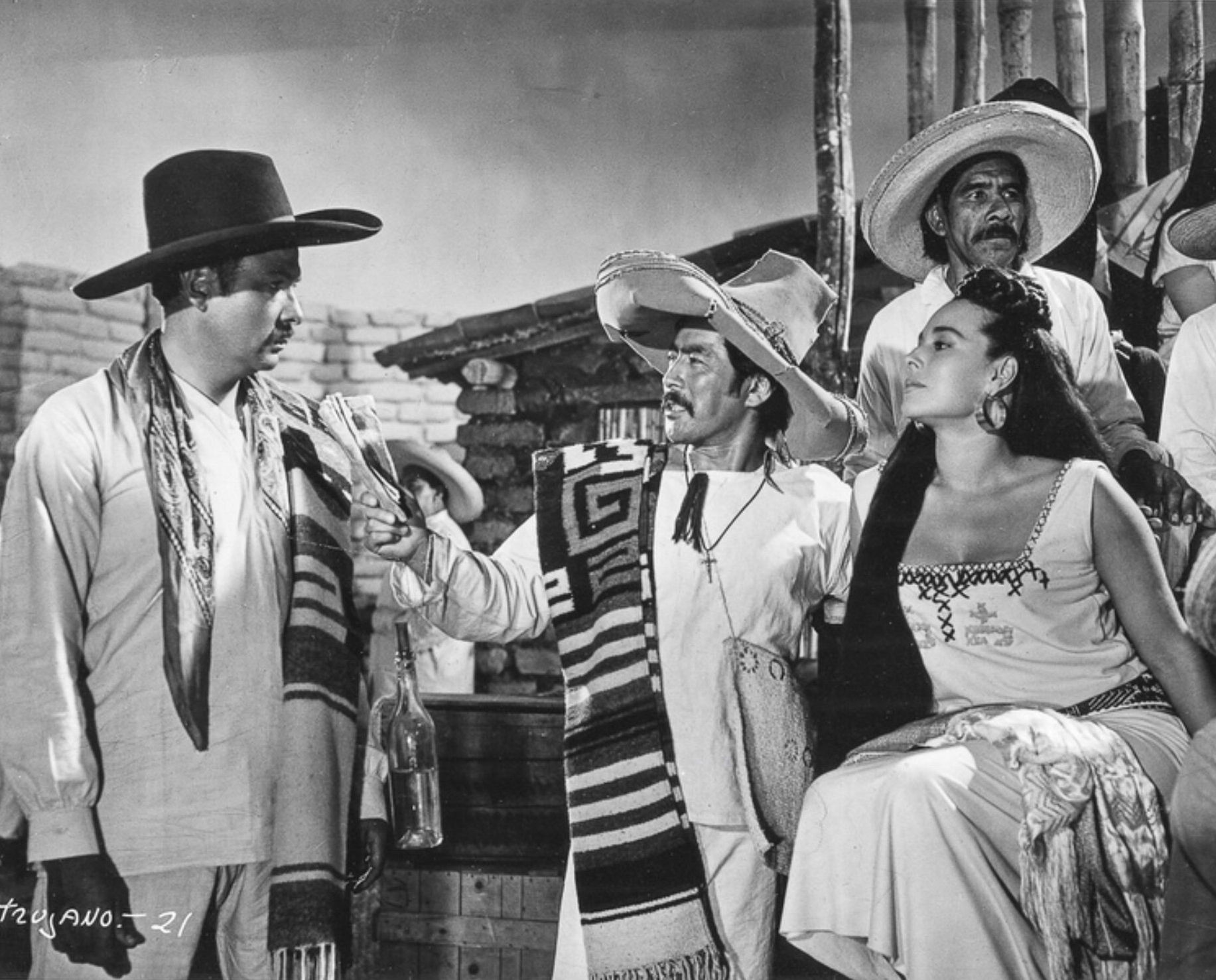
From left to right: Aguilar, Toshiro Mifune, and Flor Silvestre in Animas Trujano (1964)

Aguilar began his recording career in 1950, eventually making over 150 albums and selling more than 25 million records. He was known for his corridos, with some of his best known songs including "Gabino Barrera", "Caballo prieto azabache", "Albur de amor", and "Un puño de tierra". He was the first Mexican performer to mix rodeos and concerts while touring his show in Latin America and the United States.

He began his acting career in 1952 during the Golden Age of Mexican cinema. In the 1950s, Aguilar was cast in a series of films centered on rural hero "Mauricio Rosales" in El rayo justiciero (1955), La barranca de muerte (1955), La sierra del terror (1956), La huella del chacal (1956), La pantera negra (1957), La guarida del buitre (1958), and Los muertos no hablan (1958). Seven low-budget ranchera films produced by Rosas Films S.A. Aguilar gained cinematic notice when cast in Ismael Rodríguez's Tierra de hombres in 1956. His other collaborations with Rodríguez include La Cucaracha (1959) and Ánimas Trujano (1962), in which he received starring roles. Among his best ranchera films are Yo... el aventurero (1959), Caballo prieto azabache (1968), El ojo de vidrio (1969), and Valente Quintero (1973). Aguilar appeared in American Western films including 1969's The Undefeated starring John Wayne.

== Family ==
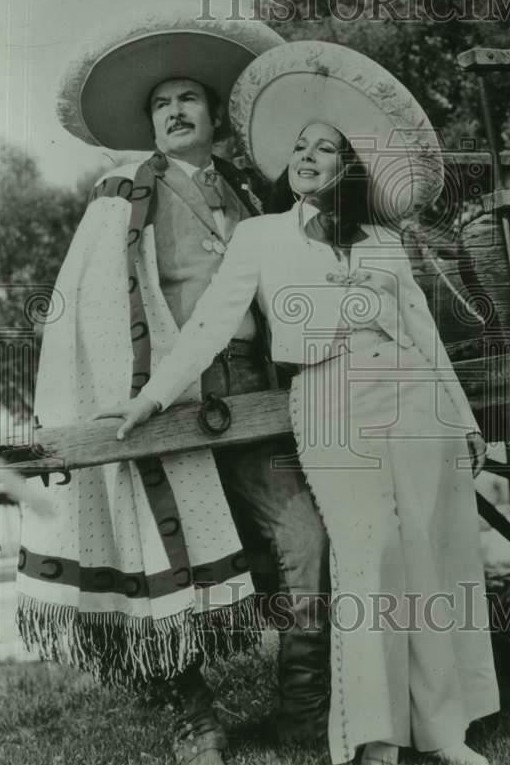
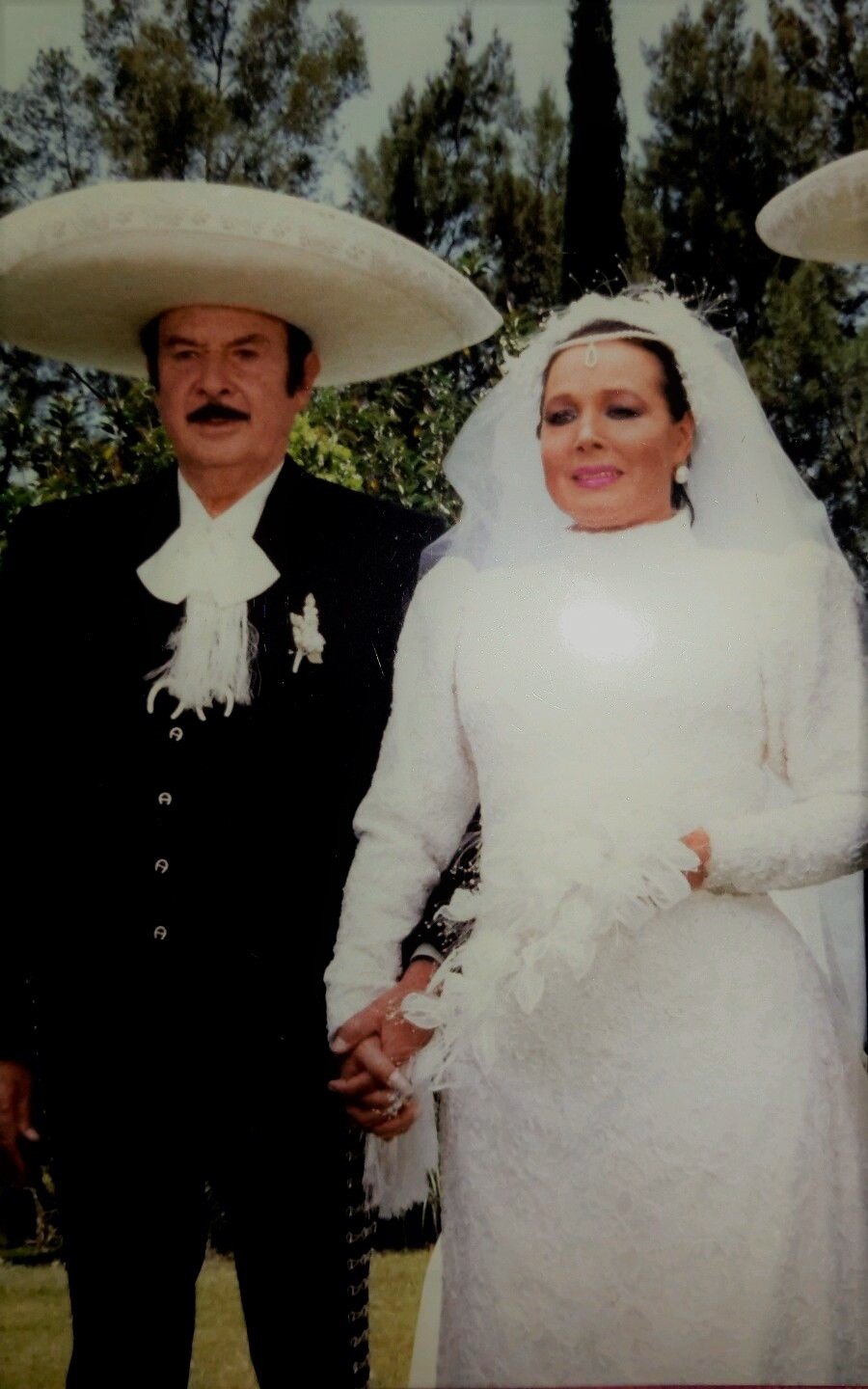
Aguilar and Flor Silvestre, circa 1976 (left), circa 1980s (right)

== Awards and honors ==
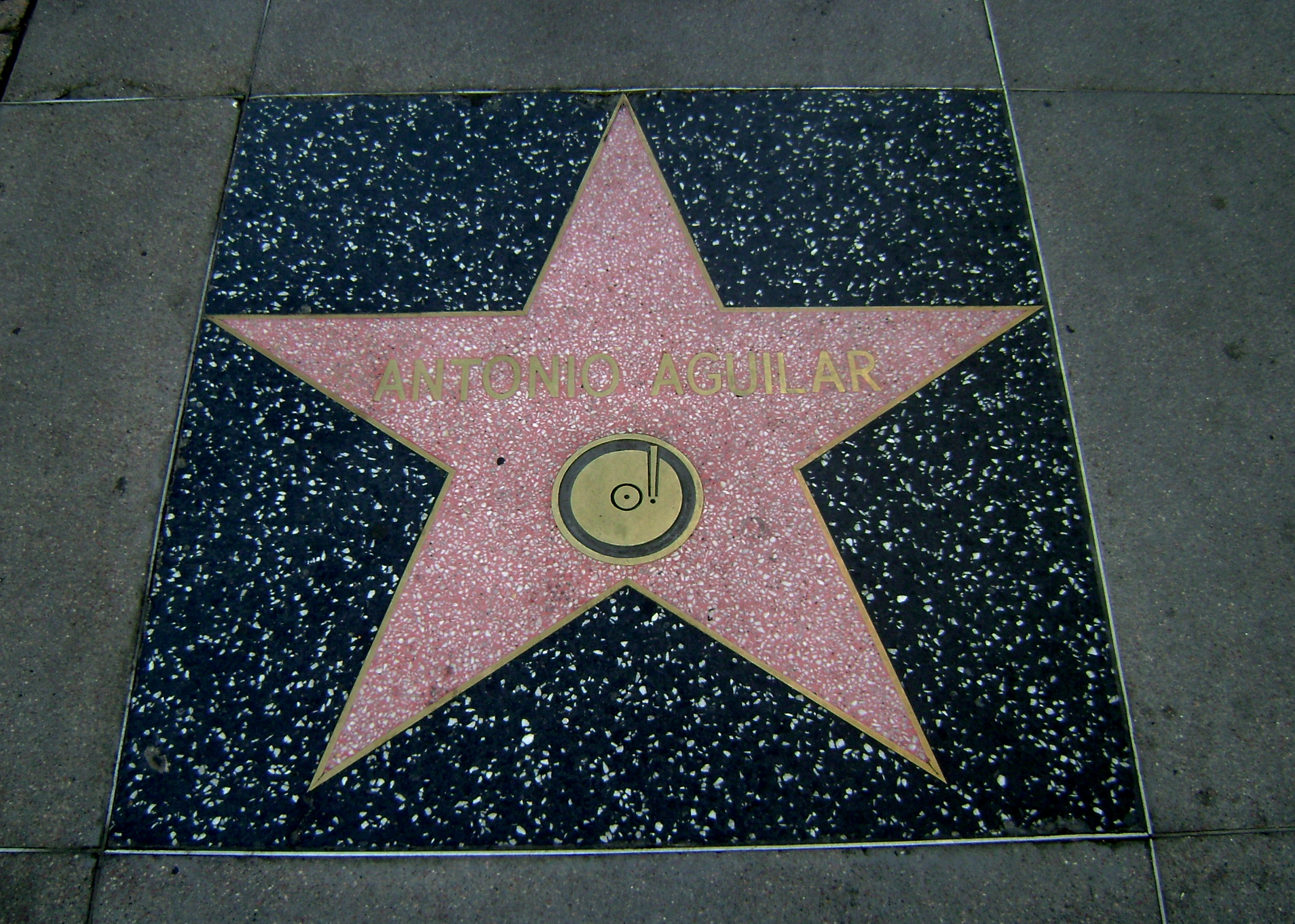
Aguilar's star on the Hollywood Walk of Fame

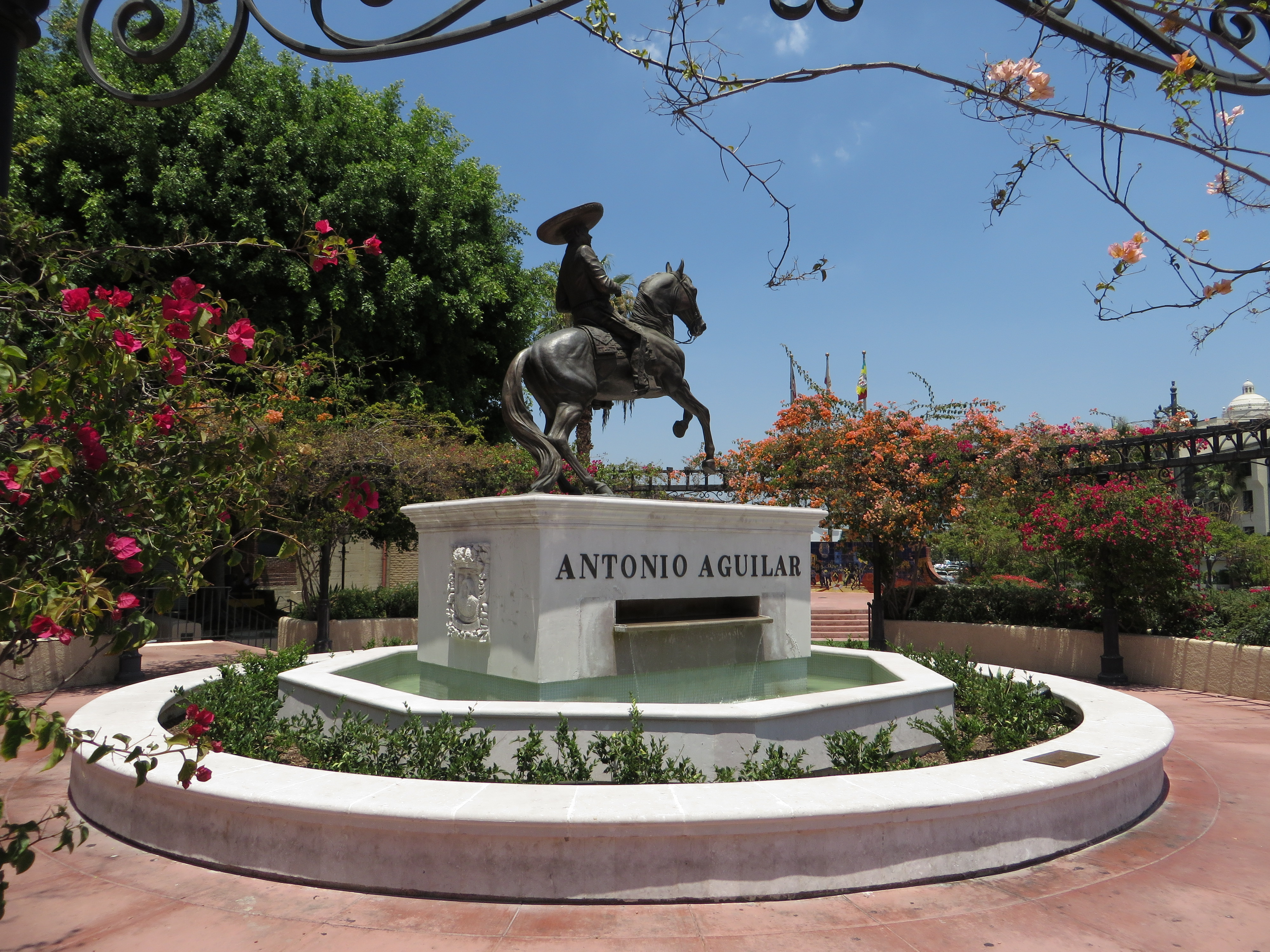
Equestrian statue of Antonio Aguilar in Los Angeles

In 2000, for his contributions to the recording industry, Aguilar was honored with a star on the Hollywood Walk of Fame at 7056 Hollywood Boulevard. In the same year, he was the recipient of the Excellence Award at the 2000 Lo Nuestro Awards and the ASCAP Latin Heritage Award. In 2004, he was the presented with the Latin Grammy Lifetime Achievement Award. He was similarly honored with his handprints and star on the Paseo de las Luminarias in Mexico City for his work in movies and in the recording industry.

== See also ==
- Antonio Aguilar filmography
- List of best-selling Latin music artists
