= List of Mexican films of 1971 =

A list of the films produced in Mexico in 1971 (see 1971 in film):

Title	Director	Cast	Genre	Notes
Águilas de acero	Rubén Galindo	Alberto Vázquez, Rodolfo de Anda, Marco Antonio Campos "Viruta"		
El águila descalza	Alfonso Aráu	Alfonso Aráu, Christa Linder		
Apolinar	Julio Castillo			
Caín, Abel y el otro	René Cardona Jr.	Enrique Guzmán, Alberto Vázquez, César Costa, Silvia Pinal		
El cielo y tu	Gilberto Gazcón	Braulio Castillo, Iran Eory, Susana Salvat, Carlos East, Gabriel Retes, Juan Peláez, Angelines Fernández		
Cuna de valientes	Gilberto Martínez Solares	Valentín Trujillo, Enrique Rambal, Marco Antonio Campos "Viruta", René Muñoz, Gregorio Casal		
Departamento de Soltero	René Cardona Jr.	Mauricio Garcés, Tere Velázquez		
Los campeones justicieros	Federico Curiel	Blue Demon, Mil Máscaras, Médico Asesino, Elsa Cárdenas, Tinieblas, David Silva, Maribel Fernández "La Pelangocha"		
Los desalmados	Rubén Galindo	Mario Almada, Fernando Almada, Lorena Velázquez, Hugo Stiglitz, Marco Antonio Campos "Viruta"		
La generala	Juan Ibáñez	María Félix, Ignacio López Tarso		
Jesús, el niño Dios	Miguel Zacarías	Jorge Rivero, Guillermo Murray		
Juegos de alcoba	Raul de Anda	Rodolfo de Anda, Claudia Islas, Natalia "Kiki" Herrera Calles		
El médico módico	Gilberto Martínez Solares	Gaspar Henaine "Capulina", Nora Larraga "Karla", Eric del Castillo, Pancho Córdova		
El ogro	Ismael Rodríguez	Tin Tan		Co-production with Guatemala
Secreto de confesión	Julián Soler	Silvia Pinal, Raúl Ramírez, Silvia Pasquel		
Vuelo 701	Raúl de Anda Jr.	Pedro Armendáriz, Jr., Sonia Furió, Jacqueline Andere, Carlos East, Héctor Suárez, Carlos Bracho		
Yesenia	Alfredo B. Crevenna	Jacqueline Andere, Jorge Lavat		
El jardín de la tía Isabel	Felipe Cazals	Jorge Martínez de Hoyos, Claudio Brook, Gregorio Casal, Jorge Luke, Germán Robles, Alfonso Aráu		
Tampico	Arturo Martínez	Julio Alemán, Norma Lazareno, Anel, Alicia Bonet		
Ya sé quién eres (Te he estado observando)	José Agustín	Angélica María, Claudia Islas, Octavio Galindo, Natalia "Kiki" Herrera Calles		
La casa del farol rojo		Sara García		
La chamuscada				
Los Beverly de Peralvillo	Fernando Cortés	Guillermo Rivas, Leonorilda Ochoa, Arturo Castro, Amparo Arozamena		
Octaman	Harry Essex	Pier Angeli, Kerwin Mathews, Jeff Morrow		Co-production with the United States
Sentinels of Silence	Robert Amram		Documentary	Won two Academy Awards in 1972; one for Best Short Subject and one for Best Documentary Short Subject
The Incredible Invasion	Luis Enrique Vergara	Boris Karloff, Yerye Beirute, Enrique Guzmán		

== See also ==
- 1971 in Mexico
