= ¡Qué familia tan cotorra! =

1973 film by Fernando Cortés

- Directed by: Fernando Cortés
- Written by: Mauricio Kleiff
- Based on: Los Beverly de Peralvillo TV series by Mauricio Kleiff
- Starring: Guillermo Rivas; Leonorilda Ochoa; Arturo Castro; Amparo Arozamena
- Production companies: América Films, Diana Films
- Release date: February 22, 1973 (Mexico City)
- Country: Mexico

¡Qué familia tan cotorra! (English: What a talkative family!) is a 1973 Mexican comedy film directed by Fernando Cortés. It is the sequel to the film, Los Beverly de Peralvillo (1971).

== Synopsis ==
As Borras and Pecas get ready for their new child, the Beverlys come into the new family's home.

== Cast ==
- Guillermo Rivas as "El Borras"
- Leonorilda Ochoa as "La Pecas"
- Arturo Castro as "Bigotón"
- Amparo Arozamena as Doña Chole "La Tarantula"
