= Rosa Furman =

Mexican actress (1930–1999)

- Born: Rosa Furman Epstein; 25 October 1930; Mexico City, Mexico
- Died: 29 October 1999 (aged 69); Mexico City, Mexico
- Education: National Autonomous University of Mexico
- Occupation: Actress
- Years active: 1950–1999

Rosa Furman Epstein (25 October 1930 – 29 October 1999) was a Mexican actress.

== Career ==
Furman was born in Mexico City to Favy Furman Jaitzer of Mogilev, Belarus, and Sulamita Epstein Lamdansky of Aukštadvaris, Lithuania. She was raised in Pachuca, Hidalgo. She studied dramatic arts and English at the National Autonomous University of Mexico.

She began her career on the stage, appearing in plays such as El tiempo es un sueño (1950) and Anunciación de María (1963), both at Guadalajara's Teatro Degollado. After her film debut in the early 1960s, she participated in many popular films and television series. She is remembered for her role as Dorotea "La Cuarraca" in the very prestigious 1967 film adaptation of Juan Rulfo's novel Pedro Páramo. She also received critical acclaim for her performance in the French film Le Rapace (1968), which was shot in Mexico and contains her only starring role. She appeared, albeit uncredited, in the Cantinflas vehicle Un quijote sin mancha (1969). She then played a friend of Shirley MacLaine's character in Two Mules for Sister Sara (1970). In 1972, she traveled to Antonio Aguilar's hacienda in Tayahua, Zacatecas, to play a small role in his film La yegua colorada (released in 1973). She and Diana Ochoa memorably played sisters "La Seca" and "La Meca", two gossipy spinsters, in the comedy La presidenta municipal (1975), starring María Elena Velasco (as La India María), Adalberto Martínez "Resortes" and Pancho Córdova. She had a supporting role in Albur de amor (1980).

In 1997, she received a nomination for the Ariel Award for Best Actress in a Minor Role (Mejor Actriz de Cuadro) for her performance in Profundo carmesí (1996).

== Death ==
She died from cardiac arrest on October 29, 1999, at age 69.

== Filmography ==
- De color moreno (1963) - Aspirante a bailarina
- Viento distante (1965) - Aunt
- Lola de mi vida (1965)
- Amor amor amor (1965) - (segment "Lola de mi vida")
- Pedro Páramo (1967) - Dorotea la Cuarraca
- Domingo salvaje (1967)
- Santo vs. the Martian Invasion (1967) - Esposa en fiesta (uncredited)
- Santo vs. the Villains of the Ring (1968) - Mujer en una sesión (uncredited)
- Guns for San Sebastian (1968) - Agueda
- Le Rapace (1968) - Camito
- Los amigos (1968)
- Un Quijote sin mancha (1969) - Presidenta de la moral (uncredited)
- La maestra inolvidable (1969) - Bruja
- Two Mules for Sister Sara (1970) - 2nd Woman in the Night
- Yesenia (1971) - Trifenia
- Los marcados (1971)
- Pubertinaje (1971) - (segment "Juego de espejos")
- El medio pelo (1972) - Romana
- The Revengers (1972) - (uncredited)
- Mi niño Tizoc (1972) - Turista gringa
- La yegua colorada (1973) - Mujer en restaurant
- El profeta Mimi (1973) - Prostituta asesinada
- Calzonzín inspector (1974)
- Descenso del pais de la noche (1974) - Esposa de Rodrigo
- La presidenta municipal (1975) - Eufracia Mastuerzo 'La Seca'
- Santo vs. las lobas (1976) - Ana
- Celestina (1976) - Alisa
- Alucarda (1977) - (uncredited)
- La plaza de Puerto Santo (1978) - Candida
- La casa del pelícano (1978) - Amelia
- Matar por matar (1979)
- El secuestro de los cien millones (1980)
- Albur de amor (1980) - madre de Alfredo
- Veneno para las hadas (1986) - Señora Krinsky (uncredited)
- Oro, dolor y muerte (1991)
- Profundo carmesí (1996) - Sara Silberman
- Abolengo (1998) - Doña Mercedes
- Entre la tarde y la noche (2000) - Mother Superior (final film role)
