= Lupita Pallás =

Mexican actress

- Born: Guadalupe Pallás Téllez; 29 April 1926; Mexico City, Mexico
- Died: 24 November 1985 (aged 59); Luqa, Malta
- Occupations: Actress, dancer
- Years active: 1974–1985
- Spouse: Óscar Ortiz de Pinedo
- Children: Jorge, Óscar, Laila

Guadalupe "Lupita" Pallás Téllez (29 April 1926 – 23 November 1985) was a Mexican actress and dancer. The wife of character actor Óscar Ortiz de Pinedo and the mother of comedian Jorge Ortiz de Pinedo, she died (along with her daughter, Laila Guadalupe Ortiz de Pinedo Pallás) during a terrorist attack aboard their flight from Greece to Egypt.

== Filmography ==
Year	Title	Role	Notes
1974	La madrecita	Sor	Credited as Lupe Pallas
1975	La presidenta municipal	Epigmenia	Credited as Lupe Pallas
1977	Sor Tequila	Domingo's sister	Uncredited
1979	La sotana del reo	Doña Delfina	
1987	Mas buenas que el pan		Credited as Guadalupe Pallás (posthumous release)

== Television work ==
Year	Title	Role
1981	Juegos del destino	Josefina
1982	Gabriel y Gabriela	Eduviges
1983	Hogar, dulce hogar	Xochitl's mother
1985	Abandonada	Cupertina
