= José Ángel Espinoza =

Mexican singer-songwriter and film actor

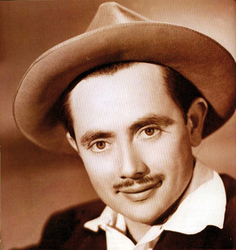
- Born: José Ángel Espinoza Aragón; 2 October 1919; Choix, Sinaloa, Mexico
- Died: 6 November 2015 (aged 96); Mazatlán, Sinaloa, Mexico
- Other name: Ferrusquilla
- Occupations: Singer-songwriter and film actor
- Children: Angélica Aragón; Isaura Espinoza
- Relatives: Martha Ofelia Galindo

José Ángel Espinoza Aragón (2 October 1919 – 6 November 2015), also known as Ferrusquilla, was a Mexican singer-songwriter and film actor. He was the father of actress Angélica Aragón. There is a statue of him along Olas Altas Promenade in Mazatlán, Mexico. He also was a composer affiliated to the SACM (Society of Authors and Composers of Mexico).

Espinoza was born in Choix, Sinaloa on 2 October 1919, though the family moved to El Guayabo after the death of his mother. The family moved once again to Los Mochis, where Espizona attended secondary school. He went to Mazatlán in 1935 to continue his studies before going to Mexico City two years later to pursue a medical degree. However, Espinoza became enamored by the radio industry and began working at XEQ-AM in 1938.

== Selected filmography ==
- ¡Ya tengo a mi hijo! (1946) – Gitano (uncredited)
- A media luz (1947)
- The Private Affairs of Bel Ami (1947) – Vendedor de paraguas (uncredited)
- The Newlywed Wants a House (1948) – José Conejo
- Hijos de la mala vida (1949)
- Midnight (1949) – Profesor Florentino Mendizábal
- The Perez Family (1949) – Narrator
- Carta Brava (1949) – Gilberto
- Las puertas del presidio (1949) – Zeferino Martínez 'El Ciengramos'
- La liga de las muchachas (1950) – Mario
- Mariachis (1950)
- Quinto patio (1950) – Javier
- Pata de palo (1950) – Ferruco
- La tienda de la esquina (1951) – Cristóbal
- La hija de la otra (1951) – Picot
- Retorno al quinto patio (1951) – Javier
- Mátenme porque me muero (1951) – Narrator
- Por el mismo camino (1953) – Fritas
- The Strange Passenger (1953) – Lucas Soriano
- Reportaje (1953) – Young doctor from Yucatán
- The Rapture (1954) – Don Cándido
- Madame X (1955) – Ruperto Sánchez (Sanchitos)
- Amor de lejos (1955) – El enchufe
- Fury in Paradise (1955)
- The Littlest Outlaw (1955) – Señor Garcia
- Massacre (1956) – Vincent
- Comanche (1956) – Scalphunter (uncredited)
- Bandido (1956) – Driver
- Mi influyente mujer (1957)
- Tres desgraciados con suerte (1958)
- Aquí está Heraclio Bernal (1958) – Vicente Bernal
- El rayo de Sinaloa (La venganza de Heraclio Bernal) (1958) – Vicente Bernal
- Sierra Baron (1958) – Felipe
- La rebelión de la sierra (1958) – Vicente Bernal
- Qué noche aquella (1959)
- Pa' qué me sirve la vida (1961)
- Dos Alegres Gavilanes (1963) – Tito
- Qué bonito es querer (1963)
- El hombre de papel (1963) – Torcuato
- El amor llegó a Jalisco (1963)
- El norteño (1963)
- Dos alegres gavilanes (1963) – Titote
- Vuelve el Norteño (1964) – Chimino
- Dos inocentes mujeriegos (1964)
- Los hermanos Barragán (1964) – Figaro
- Cuatro balazos (1964) – Borracho
- La sombra del mano negra (1964)
- La nueva Cenicienta (1964)
- El niño y el muro (1965) – Hombre que escapa del muro
- Las tapatías nunca pierden (1965) – Casio
- El dengue del amor (1965)
- Viva Maria! (1965) – The Dictator of San Miguel
- El tragabalas (1966) – Viejo preso
- Gigantes planetarios (1966) – Rey Taquito
- El planeta de las mujeres invasoras (1966) – Taquito
- Los jinetes de la bruja (En el viejo Guanajuato) (1966) – Don Manuelito
- Rage (1966)
- La guerrillera de Villa (1967)
- The Bandits (1967)
- El centauro Pancho Villa (1967) – Miguelito
- Guns for San Sebastian (1968) – Luis
- House of Evil (1968) – Dr. Emery Horvath
- The Candy Man (1969) – The Vagabond
- Faltas a la moral (1970) – Filarmonico
- Two Mules for Sister Sara (1970) – French Officer
- Chisum (1970) – Governor's Aide (uncredited)
- El hermano Capulina (1970) – Carlos Gutiérrez
- The Bridge in the Jungle (1970) – Garcia
- El tunco Maclovio (1970) – The Gunfighter
- Rio Lobo (1970) – (uncredited)
- Big Jake (1971) – Hotel Clerk (uncredited)
- Chico Ramos (1971)
- Something Big (1971) – Emilio Estevez
- Los Beverly de Peralvillo (1971) – El Padrino, abogado
- The Doubt (1972) – Don Pío
- Pobre, pero honrada (1973) – Chimino
- El extraño caso de Rachel K (1973)
- En busca de un muro (1974) – Dr. Atl
- El desconocido (1974) – Sanchito
- Mary, Mary, Bloody Mary (1975)
- El padrino... es mi compadre (1975)
- El alegre divorciado (1976) – Gonzalitos
- Cuartelazo (1977) – Manuel Gutiérrez Zamora
- Mariachi – Fiesta de sangre (1977) – Don Nico
- Ratero (1979) – Profe
- El Bronco (1982) – Manager
- To Kill a Stranger (1984) – Gas attendant
- Guantanamera (1995) – Justo
- Sabor latino (1996) – Comisario René
- Mambí (1998) – Parroquiano (final film role)

== Selected songs ==
- "Échame a mi la culpa"
- "La ley del monte"
- "El tiempo que te quede libre"
- "Cariño nuevo"
- "Silencio Corazón"
- "Sufriendo a solas"
