= Xavier Marc =

Mexican actor (1948–2022)

Xavier Rivera Marc (16 January 1948 – 19 February 2022) was a Mexican actor, known for his roles in Two Mules for Sister Sara, The Bridge in the Jungle, and The Legend of Zorro.

== Life and career ==
He studied acting at the School of Theatre Arts of the National Institute of Fine Arts, in New York, at the Dimitrio Sarrás Studio, and at the academy of Uta Hagen and Herbert Berghof in New York. He received a grant from the French government to study the Brecht and Stanislavski methods in Paris. At the University of California at Los Angeles (UCLA) he took classes in screenwriting, acting, singing, and pantomime. He debuted as an actor in the theatre in the play "The Comedy of Errors" in 1960. Marc died on 19 February 2022, at the age of 74.
