= Las golfas =

- Directed by: Fernando Cortés
- Screenplay by: Alfonso Anaya (play); Alfredo Varela
- Produced by: Fernando Cortés; Luis Antonio Gatica
- Starring: Isela Vega; Gilda Mirós; Gina Romand; José Luis Rodríguez; Ángel Garasa
- Cinematography: Eduardo Rojo
- Edited by: Sergio Soto
- Music by: Sergio Guerrero
- Release date: 11 September 1969 (Mexico)
- Running time: 87 minutes
- Country: Mexico
- Language: Spanish

Las golfas is a 1969 Mexican film directed by Fernando Cortés and starring Isela Vega, Gilda Mirós, Gina Romand, José Luis Rodríguez and Ángel Garasa.

== Plot ==
The stories of sex workers and their struggle to leave their lifestyle behind.

== Cast ==
- Isela Vega as Otilia
- Gilda Mirós as Rosaura
- Gina Romand as Mariana
- Malú Reyes as Emma
- Sandra Boyd as Elvira
- José Luis Rodríguez as Andrés "El Uñas"
- Ángel Garasa as Don Florentino Fernández (as Don Angel Garasa)
- Sergio Barrios as The Director
- Omar Jasso as Crisóforo Belloso, the drunk (as Omar Jaso)
- Jorge Ortiz de Pinedo as El Quinto
- Rafael Inclán as The Preacher
- Enrique Pontón
- Clara Osollo
- Aurora Alonso as La costeña
- Arturo Silva
- Clarissa Ahuet (as Clarisa Ahuet)
- Polo Villa
- Antonio Brillas
- Carlos Bravo y Fernández (uncredited)
- Roberto Meyer as Don Nachito (uncredited)

== Bibliography ==
- Gomezjara, Francisco A.; Barrera, Estanislao; Pérez Ramírez; Nicolás. Sociología de la prostitución. Ediciones Nueva Sociología, 1978.
- García Riera, Emilio. Historia documental del cine mexicano: 1968-1969. Universidad de Guadalajara, 1994.
- Garcia Berumen, Frank Javier. Latino Image Makers in Hollywood: Performers, Filmmakers and Films Since the 1960s. McFarland, 2016.
