= Tonta, tonta, pero no tanto =

Tonta, tonta, pero no tanto (English: Foolish, Foolish, But Not So Much) is a 1972 Mexican comedy film directed by Fernando Cortés and starring María Elena Velasco as La India María.

== Plot ==
In San Jose de Los Burros, María Nicolasa Cruz is encouraged by her cousin Eufemia, who has found work for her, to migrate to Mexico City for a better life. However, she is robbed as soon as she gets out of the train, and is homeless. But she soon finds help from TV personality Paco Malgesto, who makes an announcement of her story, where Eufemia soon goes after to pick her up.

== Cast ==
- Maria Elena Velasco as Maria Nicolasa Cruz
- Sergio Ramos as Crescencio "Chencho" Torrijos
- Paco Malgesto as himself
- Julián de Meriche as Wilfredo Villegas/Leandro McKinley
- Emma Arvizu as Doña Julia Escandón de León
- Anel as Lucy
- Kiki Herrera Calles as Leandro McKinley's widow
- Antonio Bravo as Esteban the butler
- Héctor Herrera as Gómez
