= María Dueñas =

María Dueñas may refer to:

- María Dueñas (writer)
- María Dueñas (violinist)
- Maru Dueñas, born María Eugenia Dueñas Posadas, Mexican actress, director and producer
