= La presidenta municipal =

- Directed by: Fernando Cortés
- Screenplay by: Alfredo Varela, Jr. Fernando Cortés
- Story by: Marco Antonio Almazán
- Produced by: Fernando de Fuentes, Jr.
- Starring: María Elena Velasco «La India María» Adalberto Martínez "Resortes"; Fernando Soto «Mantequilla» Joaquín García "Borolas"; Manuel "Flaco" Ibáñez; Leopoldo "Polo" Ortín; Rosita Bouchot; Rosa Furman
- Cinematography: Fernando Colín
- Edited by: Sergio Soto
- Music by: Sergio Guerrero
- Production company: Estudios América
- Distributed by: Diana Films
- Release date: September 11, 1975
- Running time: 95 minutes
- Country: Mexico
- Language: Spanish

La presidenta municipal ("The Municipal President") is a 1975 Mexican comedy film written and directed by Fernando Cortés and starring María Elena Velasco «La India María», Adalberto Martínez "Resortes", Fernando Soto «Mantequilla», Joaquín García "Borolas", Manuel "Flaco" Ibáñez, Leopoldo "Polo" Ortín, Rosita Bouchot and Rosa Furman. The film was shot at Tlayacapan, Morelos, Mexico.

== Plot ==
In the small town of Chipitongo el Alto (in English: High Chipitongo), the political boss Don Mario N. Cruz is the only presidential (town mayor) candidate of that municipality. When the town's clumsy and blind pressman Don Casimiro Buenavista prints "María" instead of "Mario" on all the ballots, the presidential candidacy automatically reverts to María Nicolasa Cruz, an illiterate and indigenous potter. Once informed, María Nicolasa accepts her new job as municipal president of Chipitongo el Alto only to rebuke the town's corrupt secretaries. Mario Nicanor Cruz, the former candidate, plans several schemes along with lawyer Topillo in order to get rid of María.

== Cast ==
- María Elena Velasco «La India María» as María Nicolasa Cruz
- Adalberto Martínez "Resortes" as Cabo Melquiádes
- Pancho Córdova as Mr. Peppermint
- Fernando Soto «Mantequilla» as Don Chepito Domínguez
- Joaquín García "Borolas" as Secretario López (credited as Joaquín García)
- Raúl Meraz as Mario Nicanor Cruz
- José Chávez Trowe as Pedro
- Polo Ortín as Licenciado Hugo T. Topillo
- Chis Chas as Pablo
- Alfonso Zayas as Secretario Rodríguez
- Manuel "Flaco" Ibáñez as Licenciado Cástulo Barrenillo (credited as Manuel Ibáñez)
- Antonio Bravo as Sacerdote
- Rosita Bouchot as Chencha
- Lupita Pallás as Epigmenia (credited as Lupe Pallas)
- Armando Arriola as Don Casimiro Buenavista
- Ivan de Meriche as Rosendo
- Rosa Furman as La Seca
- Diana Ochoa as La Meca
- Rolando Barral as himself
- Carlos Bravo y Fernández as Director de banda municipal (credited as Carlos Bravo)
- Queta Carrasco as Queta, esposa de don Casimiro
- María Andrea Cantú
- Angelina Cruz
- Yolanda de Fuentes as Hija ilegítima
- Gabriela de Fuentes as Gabriela Martínez
- María Fernanda de Fuentes as María Fernanda Martínez
- Gerardo Zepeda as Boticario
- José L. Murillo as Don Salustio, cantinero
- Lina Montes as Esposa del boticario (uncredited)

== Trivia ==
- Actors Pancho Córdova, José Chávez Trowe, and Rosa Furman also appear in the film Two Mules for Sister Sara (1970), also filmed in Tlayacapan, Morelos, Mexico.
