= El que no corre...vuela =

1982 Mexican film by Gilberto Mastinez Solares

El que no corre ...vuela (translation: Run fast or fly high) is a 1982 Mexican adventure and comedy film directed and co-written by Gilberto Martínez Solares, starring María Elena Velasco, Evita Muñoz 'Chachita' and Freddy Fernández.

== Plot ==
María, from San Pablo Cuatro Venados, arrives in Mexico City to speak with a deputy who had promised to help the farmers after their land was stolen from them. As the deputy does not receive her she quickly discovers just how chaotic urban living can be. A misunderstanding land her in jail where she befriends Laura, an unjustly imprisoned woman whose kids live in the streets. When she is released, Laura implores Maria to look for her children. María finds them with a chap who treats them badly, and to take care of them she works as a maid.

In struggling to adapt to a new city, and community, she realizes that in life in the city, like everywhere else, you have to run or even fly to get what you want and that no one would do for you what you do not do for yourself. How she copes with what life throws at her and those around her is what supplies the laughter and comedy.
