= Poor But Honest =

1973 film by Fernando Cortés

- Directed by: Fernando Cortés
- Written by: Fernando Galiana; Julio Porter; Fernando Cortés
- Produced by: Fernando de Fuentes hijo
- Starring: María Elena Velasco; Fernando Soler; Norma Lazareno
- Cinematography: Sergio Soto
- Music by: Gustavo Pimentel
- Production company: Diana Films
- Release date: 1 November 1973
- Running time: 88 minutes
- Country: Mexico
- Language: Spanish

Poor But Honest (Spanish: Pobre, pero honrada!) is a 1973 Mexican comedy film directed by Fernando Cortés and starring María Elena Velasco, Fernando Soler and Norma Lazareno. It was made at the Estudios América. It was one of a series of films featuring Velasco as the comic character La India María.

== Cast ==
- María Elena Velasco as María
- Fernando Soler as Don Abundio
- Norma Lazareno as Marcela
- Ángel Garasa as Padre Bonifacio
- Adalberto Rodriguez
- José Ángel Espinoza as Chimino
- Raúl Meraz as Ayundante de don Abundio
- Héctor Herrera
- Julián de Meriche as Doctor Villegas
- Alicia del Lago as Enamorada de don Abundio
- Armando Arriola as Viejito
- Elena Contla as Criada de don Abundio
- Jorge Fegán
- Jaime Manterola
- Alfonso Zayas as Borracho
- Patricia Olmos
- Pura Vargas
- Manuel Dondé
- Armando Acosta
- Fernando Cortés
- José Luis Jiménez

== Bibliography ==
- Mora, Carl J. Mexican Cinema: Reflections of a Society, 1896-2004. McFarland & Co, 2005.
