= Guillermo Rivas =

Guillermo Rivas may refer to:

- Guillermo Rivas (actor) (1927–2004), Mexican character actor
- Guillermo Rivas (tennis) (born 1964), Argentine tennis player
