= Fury in Paradise =

- Directed by: George Bruce
- Written by: George Bruce
- Produced by: Alfonso Sánchez Tello
- Starring: Peter M. Thompson; Rebeca Iturbide; Eduardo Noriega; Fanny Schiller; Carlos Rivas
- Cinematography: Jack Draper
- Edited by: Charles Kimball
- Music by: Gonzalo Curiel
- Production companies: Amex, Inc.
- Distributed by: Gibraltar Motion Picture Distributors, Inc.
- Release date: 1955
- Running time: 77 minutes
- Country: United States
- Language: English

Fury in Paradise is a 1955 Western film written and directed by George Bruce. Set in 1910 Mexico, the film follows a gringo Texan (Thompson) who is caught up in the on-going revolution while on vacation and becomes romantically involved with a wealthy Mexican rancher's daughter (Iturbide).

Shot in Mexico in 1953, the film was an independent co-production between the United States and Mexico, and was released in the U.S. in 1955 and in Mexico in 1965.

== Cast ==
- Peter M. Thompson as Jim Gregg
- Rebeca Iturbide as Consuelo Alvarez
- Eduardo Noriega as Captain Vasquez
- Felipe Nolan as Don Francisco Alvarez
- José Ángel Espinosa as Chucho
- Fanny Schiller as Doña Mercedes
- Carlos Rivas as General López

== Production ==
The film was a project of executive producer Howard Caldren, a retired lumberman, who saw the film as a way promote friendly relations between the United States and Latin America.

Filming took place on location in Mexico at the Hacienda Vista Hermosa in Jojutla, Morelos in 1953.
