= María Elena Velasco =

Mexican actress, comedian, singer-songwriter and dancer (1940–2015)

María Elena Velasco Fragoso
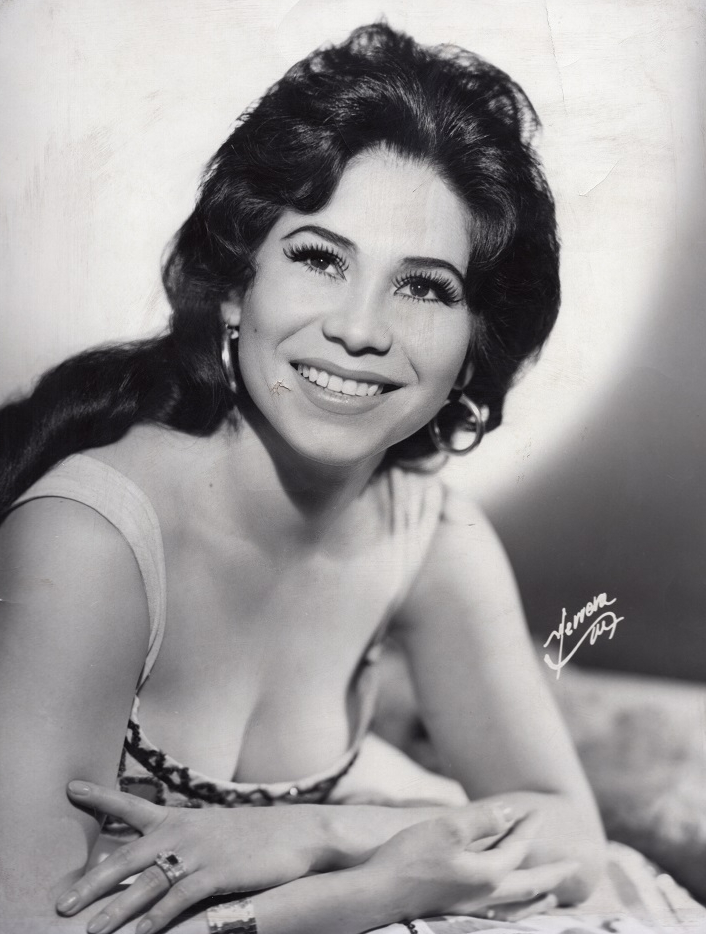
- Velasco, c. 1950s
- Born: María Elena Velasco Fragoso; 17 December 1940; Puebla, Puebla, Mexico
- Died: 1 May 2015 (aged 75); Mexico City, Mexico
- Spouse: Julián de Meriche (m. 1965; died 1974)
- Children: 2

Comedy career
- Years active: 1962–2015
- Medium: Film, television, music, theatre
- Genres: Character comedy, slapstick
- Subject: Indigenous Mexican women

María Elena Velasco Fragoso (17 December 1940 – 1 May 2015) was a Mexican actress, comedian, singer-songwriter and dancer. She was known for creating and portraying La India María, a comical character based on indigenous Mexican women.

== Early life ==
Velasco was born in Puebla, to Tomás Velasco Saavedra, a railway mechanic, and María Elena Fragoso Peón. She had three siblings, Gloria, Tomás and Susana.

After the death of Tomás Velasco, the family moved to Mexico City, where she worked as a dancer at the Teatro Tívoli (Mexico City). Later, she became one of the showgirls of the Teatro Blanquita, where she also participated in sketches starring comedians such as José "El Ojón" Jasso and Óscar Ortiz de Pinedo, among others.

== Career ==
In 1962, her popularity at the Teatro Blanquita attracted the attention of producer Miguel Morayta, who cast her in her first film role in the drama Los derechos de los hijos (1963), starring Elvira Quintana and Carlos Agostí. Juan Bustillo Oro gave her the small part of Petra, a maid, in México de mis recuerdos (1963). In 1964, she began to include comedic material to her appearances in sketches and, in the meantime, played servants in television programs. She soon developed a comedy character named Elena María, a rural Mexican woman. Her breakthrough came when director Fernando Cortés recommended her to portray an indigenous woman named "María" in one of Mantequilla's sketches. The character was dressed in traditional garb consisting of traditionally braided and ribboned hair and colorful native-type blouses and skirts. In an effort to make her portrayal more authentic, she observed the gestures and mannerisms of indigenous women; her own mother made dresses for the character. She later appeared in the western El bastardo (1968), where she was credited for the first time as "María Elena Velasco 'La India María'".

In 1969, Velasco appeared as La India María in a comic segment of the weekly program Siempre en domingo, hosted by Raúl Velasco (who is unrelated to María Elena). The segment quickly became a hit and she starred in other successful television programs. Her first La India María film, Tonta, tonta, pero no tanto (1972), was directed by Fernando Cortés; in total, Cortés directed eight La India María films until his death in 1979. The enormous success of the film spawned a series of low-budget comedies that became a mainstay in Mexican movie theaters. Velasco won a Silver Goddess Award for Best Comedic Performance for ¡El que no corre... vuela! (1982). She made her directorial debut in El coyote emplumado (1983). She also starred the television series Ay María, qué puntería (1998).

== Personal life ==
In the early 1960s, Velasco met Russian-born Mexican film actor and choreographer Julián de Meriche (born Vladimir Lipkies Chazan) at the Teatro Blanquita. They married and had two children, producer-director Iván Lipkies and actress, screenwriter and producer Ivette Eugenia Lipkies, also known as Goretti Lipkies. She later said: "My husband was worth gold, I will not lie and say he was the perfect man, but he was the love of my life."

== Death ==
Her death was announced over Twitter by the Instituto Mexicano de Cinematografía on 1 May 2015; the cause of death was not made public, but it was known that she had been suffering from stomach cancer.

== Performances ==
=== Film ===
Year	Title	Role	Logos	Notes
1963	México de mis recuerdos	Petra		First credited film role
1963	Los derechos de los hijos	María		
1964	El revólver sangriento	Pedro's wife		
1968	El bastardo	María		
1972	Tonta, tonta, pero no tanto	María Nicolasa Cruz	Warner Bros.	First India María film
1973	¡Pobre, pero honrada!	María Nicolasa Cruz	Warner Bros.	
1974	La madrecita	Sor María Nicolasa Cruz	American International Pictures	
1975	La presidenta municipal	María Nicolasa Cruz	Universal Pictures	
1976	El miedo no anda en burro	María Nicolasa Cruz	Warner Bros.	
1977	Sor Tequila	María Nicolasa "Sor Tequila"	United Artists	
1978	Duro pero seguro	María Nicolasa Cruz	American International Pictures	
1978	La comadrita	María Nicolasa Cruz	Warner Bros.	
1981	Okey, Mister Pancho	María Nicolasa Cruz	20th Century Fox	
1982	El que no corre vuela	María Nicolasa Cruz	Columbia Pictures	Silver Goddess Award for Best Comedy Performance
1983	El coyote emplumado	María	United Artists	Directorial debut
1984	Ni Chana, ni Juana	Juana Cruz / Emilia Falcón	Universal Pictures	
1988	Ni de aquí, ni de allá	María	Paramount Pictures	
1993	Se equivocó la cigüeña	María Nicolasa Cruz	Columbia Pictures	
1999	Las delicias del poder	María / Lorena Barriga	Warner Bros. Pictures	
2014	La hija de Moctezuma	María Nicolasa Cruz	Paramount Pictures	Nominated – Silver Goddess Award for Best Original Song

=== Television ===
Year	Title	Role	Notes
1969	Domingos espectaculares	La India María	
1970	Siempre en domingo	La India María	
1972	Revista musical Nescafé	La India María	
1988	Papá soltero	La India María	1 episode
1998	¡Ay María qué puntería!	La India María	
2003	La hora pico	La India María	1 episode
2003	Mujer, casos de la vida real	La India María	1 episode – "Amor incondicional"
2004	La familia P. Luche	La India María	Season 1 episode 38 – "Nos vamos de viaje"
2013	Corazón indomable	María Nicolasa Cruz de Olivares	

=== Stage ===
Year	Production	Author	Notes
1970	El séptimo sello	Ingmar Bergman	
1972	Dos viejos pánicos	Virgilio Piñera	
1972	Inmaculada	Héctor Azar	
1994	México canta y aguanta	María Elena Velasco	Mexican Theatre Critics Association Award for Best Revue

== Discography ==
- La mejor cantante de todas las grabadoras (1971)
- De chile, de dulce y de manteca (1982)

== See also ==
- List of Mexicans
- Lucila Mariscal - who played "Lencha, la india"
