= El miedo no anda en burro =

- Directed by: Fernando Cortés
- Written by: Fernando Galiana
- Produced by: Fernando de Fuentes
- Starring: María Elena Velasco «La India María» Eleazar García «Chelelo» Fernando Luján; Emma Roldán; Óscar Ortiz de Pinedo
- Cinematography: Fernando Colín
- Edited by: Sergio Soto
- Music by: Sergio Guerrero; Gustavo Pimentel
- Distributed by: Diana Films
- Release date: 25 November 1976 (Mexico)
- Running time: 88 minutes
- Country: Mexico
- Language: Spanish

El miedo no anda en burro (Fear Doesn't Ride a Donkey) is a 1976 Mexican comedy horror film directed by Fernando Cortés and starring María Elena Velasco «La India María», Eleazar García «Chelelo», Fernando Luján and Emma Roldán. This film marked the last appearance of Óscar Ortiz de Pinedo in his film role, before his death in 1978.

Literally, the title is an idiom used to express that fear strikes quickly, not calmly as if on top of a donkey. The film is one of the most successful comedies of the India María franchise, having remained in the Cine Metropolitan for an astounding nineteen weeks.

In the film, the death of a wealthy woman is expected to benefit her greedy relatives. Her will actually leaves her entire estate to her pet dog, and entrusts her loyal maid to be its caretaker. The dead woman's family make several attempts to kill both the dog and its caretaker. During a vacation at a supposedly haunted house, the caretaker encounters several monsters. The monsters are actually the villains in disguise, preparing another murder attempt.

== Plot ==
María Nicolasa Cruz is doña Clarita's loyal indigenous maid. However, doña Clarita is dying, and she is leaving behind a large monetary estate, a mansion, properties, and Mimí: her affectionate Shih Tzu dog. María is with doña Clarita during her last moments, albeit her sister Paz, brother Marciano, nephew Braulio, and grandsons Raul and Laura are waiting anxiously downstairs for her death, believing they will inherit all her riches.

Doña Clarita finally dies at the hand of a corrupt doctor employed by her own relatives, and María inconsolably goes downstairs to the living room to deliver the news. As expected, María finds none of doña Clarita's relatives mourning her death. Believing she is of no use anymore, doña Clarita's relatives (or "The Vultures" as María calls them) fire María, therefore she decides to return to her native hometown. Marciano, Paz, Braulio, Raul, and Laura meet with the notary to hear Doña Clarita's will. To everyone's surprise, the will only mentions Mimí (the dog), and María as her guardian. As part of her will, the notary only gives all of the family members a raspberry. The family members go back to stop María from leaving the mansion.

The "zopilotes" (vultures, María's nickname for Doña Clarita's family) convince María to stay in the mansion to take care of Mimí as her new guardian. The "zopilotes" try several times to kill María along with Mimí but their attempts go awry. Until Marciano feeds Mimí a piece of meat with an explosive inside. Before Mimí eats it, María takes it from her and cooks it for the afternoon meal. Braulio, unfortunately, receives the piece of meat and after cutting it, the explosive goes off. Mimí's ears were gravely affected.

The doctor advises María to go on a vacation with Mimí - to Doña Clarita's old vacation house in Guanajuato. Upon arrival, María and Mimí are scared by the butler Franki who guides them through the haunted house. Both María and Mimí survive two scary hands, a cyclops, a giant talking frog, a fern monster, a werewolf, and many more horrific things.

To María's surprise, she discovers that those scary characters are the "zopilotes". They catch them and put them in a squishing torture machine. María and Mimí, on the verge of death, are saved by Franki who was a detective investigating Doña Clarita's murder - committed by her family members. María with all these surprises asks Franki, whose real name is Maldonado, permission to faint on the floor. As she does, Marciano, Paz, Braulio, Raul, and Laura end up arrested for homicide.

== Cast ==
- María Elena Velasco «La India María» as María Nicolasa Cruz
- Eleazar García «Chelelo» as Braulio
- Fernando Luján as Raúl
- Emma Roldán as doña Paz
- Óscar Ortiz de Pinedo as don Marciano
- Gloria Mayo as Laura
- Alfredo Wally Barrón as Frankie / Maldonado (credited as Wally Barron)
- José Cibrián Jr. as American tourist
- Antonio Bravo as Doctor
- Carlos Bravo y Fernández as Notary
- Alfonso Zayas as Policeman
- Mimí as herself (Eleazar García "Chelelo" was her owner)
