= The Bridge in the Jungle =

1971 film

- Directed by: Pancho Kohner
- Written by: Pancho Kohner
- Based on: The Bridge in the Jungle by B. Traven
- Produced by: Pancho Kohner
- Starring: John Huston; Katy Jurado; Elizabeth Guadalupe Chauvet; José Ángel Espinosa 'Ferrusquilla'; Enrique Lucero; Jorge Martínez de Hoyos
- Cinematography: Xavier Cruz
- Music by: LeRoy Holmes
- Production company: Capricorn Productions
- Distributed by: United Artists
- Release date: January 1971
- Running time: 87 minutes
- Country: United States
- Language: English

The Bridge in the Jungle is a 1971 American adventure film written and directed by Pancho Kohner. The film stars John Huston, Katy Jurado, Elizabeth Guadalupe Chauvet, José Ángel Espinosa 'Ferrusquilla', Enrique Lucero and Jorge Martínez de Hoyos. The film was released in January 1971, by United Artists.

== Plot ==
In a jungle Mexican Village, a boy drowns in a river under a bridge.

== Cast ==
- John Huston as Sleigh
- Katy Jurado as Angela
- Charles Robinson as Gales
- Elizabeth Guadalupe Chauvet as Carmelita
- José Ángel Espinosa 'Ferrusquilla' as Garcia
- Enrique Lucero as Perez
- Jorge Martínez de Hoyos as Augustin
- Xavier Marc as Manuel
- Chano Urueta as Funeral Singer
- Aurora Clavel as Aurelia
- Teddy Stauffer as Warner
- Eduardo López Rojas as Ignacio
- José Chávez as Hide Trader
- Sergio Calderón as Pedro
- Enrique de Peña as Dancer
- Ramiro Ramírez as Dancer
- Carlos Berriochea as First Boy
- Juan Antonio Edwards as Second Boy
- Elizabeth Dupeyrón as Joaquina
- Gilberto Ramos Atayde as Carlos

== See also ==
- List of American films of 1971
