= La hija de Moctezuma =

- Theatrical release poster
- Directed by: Iván Lipkies
- Screenplay by: Ivette Lipkies; Iván Lipkies; Raúl S. Figueroa; M. E. Velasco
- Produced by: Ivette Lipkies
- Starring: María Elena Velasco; Eduardo Manzano; Rafael Inclán; Raquel Garza; Ernesto Pape
- Production company: Vlady Realizadores
- Distributed by: Star Castle Distribution
- Release date: 9 October 2014 (Mexico)
- Running time: 100 minutes
- Country: Mexico
- Language: Spanish
- Box office: $3.8 million

La hija de Moctezuma ("Moctezuma's Daughter") is a 2014 Mexican comedy film directed by Iván Lipkies. It stars María Elena Velasco (as La India María), Eduardo Manzano, Rafael Inclán, Raquel Garza, and Ernesto Pape. This was Maria Elena Velasco's last film played as "La India Maria" before her death.

== Synopsis ==
At the request of her great-grandfather, Moctezuma Xocoyotzin, La India María must find Tezcatlipoca's magical black mirror in order to prevent the destruction of Mexico. A Spanish archaeologist (Alonso), a tricky treasure hunter (Bianchi), and a greedy governor (Brígida Troncoso) all find out about the existence of the black mirror and embark on a frenetic chase to obtain it.

== Cast ==
- María Elena Velasco as La India María
- Eduardo Manzano as Xocoyote
- Rafael Inclán as Moctezuma
- Raquel Garza as Brígida Troncoso
- Ernesto Pape as Alonso
- Irma Dorantes as unidentified character
- Armando Silvestre as unidentified character

== Production ==
=== Casting ===
Rafael Inclán had to learn Náhuatl to play Moctezuma.

Actress and singer Irma Dorantes wanted to participate in the film and was given a small part as a secretary.

== Release ==
The film premiered in Mexico on 9 October 2014 with 370 copies distributed by Star Castle Distribution.

== Critical response ==
La hija de Moctezuma received good reviews from critics. Lucero Calderón of Excélsior wrote: "I can only say that if [Mexican] viewers sometimes see scary movies made in Hollywood, why can't they give an opportunity to a well-made film that appeals to the nostalgia of popular cinema and that was done through the efforts and sacrifice of many people."
