= Los Beverly de Peralvillo (film) =

- Directed by: Fernando Cortés
- Written by: Mauricio Kleiff
- Based on: Los Beverly de Peralvillo TV series by Mauricio Kleiff
- Starring: Guillermo Rivas; Leonorilda Ochoa; Arturo Castro «Bigotón» Amparo Arozamena
- Production companies: América Films, Diana Films
- Release date: 9 December 1971 (Mexico City)
- Country: Mexico

Los Beverly de Peralvillo is a 1971 Mexican comedy film directed by Fernando Cortés and starring Guillermo Rivas, Leonorilda Ochoa, Arturo Castro «Bigotón» and Amparo Arozamena. This film is based on the television series of the same name.

== Synopsis ==
El Borras marries La Pecas, unaware of her mother's (Doña Chole) scheme against Borras. That of Borras to provide for all her family members who are a lazy bunch composed of her father and brothers.

== Cast ==
- Guillermo Rivas as "El Borras"
- Leonorilda Ochoa as "La Pecas"
- Arturo Castro as "Bigotón"
- Amparo Arozamena as Doña Chole "La Tarantula"
