= I Am Very Macho =

1953 film by José Díaz Morales

- Directed by: José Díaz Morales
- Written by: José Díaz Morales; Carlos Sampelayo; Alfredo Varela
- Produced by: Gregorio Walerstein
- Starring: Silvia Pinal
- Cinematography: Ezequiel Carrasco
- Edited by: Alfredo Rosas Priego
- Music by: Antonio Díaz Conde
- Production companies: Cinematográfica Filmex; Túxpan
- Release date: 29 October 1953
- Running time: 80 minutes
- Country: Mexico
- Language: Spanish

I Am Very Macho (Spanish: Yo soy muy macho) is a 1953 Mexican comedy film directed by José Díaz Morales and starring Antonio Aguilar and Silvia Pinal. This film features the film debut of the cuban actress Gina Romand.

== Cast ==
- Antonio Aguilar as Tony
- Miguel Ángel Ferriz
- Silvia Pinal as María Aguirre
- Salvador Quiroz
- Gina Romand as Mercedes Galán
- Fernando Soto "Mantequilla"
- Miguel Torruco
- Enrique Zambrano

== Bibliography ==
- María Luisa Amador. Cartelera cinematográfica, 1950-1959. UNAM, 1985.
