= Carlos Rivas (actor) =

American actor (1925–2003)

- In The Black Scorpion (1957)
- Born: Oscar Weber; February 16, 1925; El Paso, Texas, U.S.
- Died: June 16, 2003 (aged 78); Los Angeles, California, U.S.
- Occupation: Actor
- Years active: 1945–2000
- Known for: The King and I True Grit
- Spouse: Sylvia

Carlos Rivas (born, Oscar Weber, February 16, 1925 – June 16, 2003) was an American actor, best remembered as Lun Tha in The King and I (1956), Dirty Bob in True Grit (1969), and Hernandez in Topaz (1969).

== Early life ==
Rivas was born in El Paso, Texas, to a German father and Mexican mother. English was his first language and he was also known as Oscar von Weber and Karl Weber.

== Career ==
Carlos Rivas was discovered in a bar in Mexico. He began his career in Mexican and Argentinian Westerns, though his Argentinian films were actually filmed in Mexico.

His American debut was in The King and I (1956) opposite Rita Moreno. After this career highlight, he was quickly reduced to supporting roles. That same year, he appeared as Johnny Bravo in the TV Western Cheyenne in the episode titled "Johnny Bravo", and in the 1961 episode of Maverick titled "Poker Face" starring Jack Kelly. Rivas had co-starring roles in two science-fiction films, The Beast of Hollow Mountain (1956) and The Black Scorpion (1957). Rivas played Chingachgook in The Deerslayer (1957) with Lex Barker, Forrest Tucker, and Rita Moreno.

In 1970, Rivas joined Ricardo Montalbán, Henry Darrow, and other Latino actors in co-founding the Nosotros ("We") Foundation, a Los Angeles-based organization devoted to improving the way Hispanics are depicted in entertainment and to advocating for Latinos in the movie and television industry.

== Partial filmography ==
- A Life in the Balance (1955) - Police officer (uncredited)
- Amor en cuatro tiempos (1955) - Antonio del Río
- La vida tiene tres días (1955) - José
- Fury in Paradise (1955)
- De carne somos (1955) - Mario Vidal
- Comanche (1956) - Wounded Comanche (uncredited)
- The King and I (1956) - Lun Tha
- The Beast of Hollow Mountain (1956) - Felipe Sanchez
- The Big Boodle (1957) - Carlos 'Rubi' Rubin (uncredited)
- The Deerslayer (1957) - Chingachgook
- La ciudad de los niños (1957) - Padre Oliver
- The Black Scorpion (1957) - Artur Ramos
- Panama Sal (1957) - Manuel Ortego
- Livets vår (1958) - Folke Sundqvist (voice)
- Where Are Our Children Going? (1958) - Eduardo
- Machete (1958) - Carlos
- Pueblo en armas (1959) - Gorgonio
- Sonatas (1959) - Juan Guzmán
- The Miracle (1959) - Carlitos
- The Unforgiven (1960) - Lost Bird
- Yo sabia demasiado! (1960)
- The Dalton That Got Away (1960) - Grey Wolf
- ¡Viva la soldadera! (1960)
- Pepe (1960) - Carlos
- Mi guitarra y mi caballo (1961) - (uncredited)
- La máscara roja (1962) - Sebastián Carrillo
- Matar o morir (1963)
- They Saved Hitler's Brain (1963) (released 1968) - Camino Padua/Teo Padua
- Una cara para escapar (1963)
- Los viciosos (1962)
- El Club del clan (1964) - Chico Novarro (voice)
- Duelo de pistoleros (1966)
- Tarzan and the Valley of Gold (1966) - Romulo
- The Chinese Room (1968) - Nicolás Vidal
- Hang Your Hat on the Wind (1969) - Tall Bandit
- True Grit (1969) - Mexican Bob
- The Undefeated (1969) - Diaz
- Topaz (1969) - Hernandez
- The Phantom Gunslinger (1970) - Sam
- The Gatling Gun (1971) - Two-Knife
- Doc Savage: The Man of Bronze (1975) - Kulkan
- Tarjeta verde (1978)
- Young Rebels (1989) - Mr. Vincenzo
- Discriminación maldita (1990)
- Gas Food Lodging (1992) - Padre
- Mi Vida Loca (1993) - Sad Girl's Father
