= La madrecita =

- Directed by: Fernando Cortés
- Written by: Fernando Galiana
- Produced by: Fernando de Fuentes, Jr.
- Starring: María Elena Velasco; Pancho Córdova; Óscar Ortiz de Pinedo
- Cinematography: Fernando Colín
- Edited by: Sergio Soto
- Music by: Sergio Guerrero
- Production company: Estudios América
- Distributed by: Diana Films
- Release date: October 17, 1974 (Mexico)
- Running time: 83 minutes
- Country: Mexico
- Language: Spanish

La madrecita (The Little Nun, literally The Little Mother) is a 1974 Mexican film directed by Fernando Cortés and starring María Elena Velasco as La India María, with Pancho Córdova and Óscar Ortiz de Pinedo.

== Plot ==
On a Sunday morning, an attorney arrives at a small convent to bring bad news. The property, which was given by the Jovellanos family forty-seven years before, has been recollected as the inheritance was not done with the proper legal procedure, and the actual heir plans to sell it off to build a shopping mall there. However, due to this mishap, the nuns are given a right to buy the property, which is worth 400,000 pesos. At the same time, a letter with the news of a new arrival is received by the convent.

Soon the new arrival is on her way. Her name is Sor María Nicolasa, and in the train Sor María is traveling in she befriends the children there. When the doll of one of them falls through the window, Sor María pulls the emergency brakes to recover it and due to this unlawful stop she is sent to the commissary. After being released, she learns of a group of young boys who steal a couple of stores. Sor María convinces most of them to head to the convent in order to become better children. The only one who does not want to go is the leader, nicknamed "El Greñas" (Hairs). Sor María wants to give him tamales and hot chocolate from the convent. However, El Greñas is discovered by the police and the store's owner. El Greñas is arrested, but Sor María buys a radio he stole, so the proof against him is disregarded. El Greñas is freed but he believes Sor María to be a stool pigeon thus leaving angry. Sor María then enters a contest given by Novedades magazine to win a house. She tries to cheat with the contest to make her the winner in order to house the nuns, but the director is aghast and somewhat bothered by this petition.

After going to visit El Greñas' dad and convincing him to change his ways El Greñas later changes his attitude towards Sor María. He and the other children ask her to take them to the circus. Later the attorney arrives, stating the period to buy the property is over, and they are ordered to evict the building. Once again, Sor María does her thing by stopping the eviction and is arrested once more. Shortly after Sor María is seen singing the Ave Maria and the Novedades director arrives ready to give her the good news of her winning the house after all. The movie ends with Sor María showing her handcuffs.

== Cast ==
- María Elena Velasco as Sor María Nicolasa Cruz
- Pancho Córdova as Comisario
- Óscar Ortiz de Pinedo as Novedades director
- Ahui as El Greñas
- Martha Roth as the abbess
- Carlos Bravo y Fernández "Carlhillos" as the attorney
- Lupe Pallás as Sor Juana
