= Gina Romand =

Cuban-Mexican actress (1938–2022)

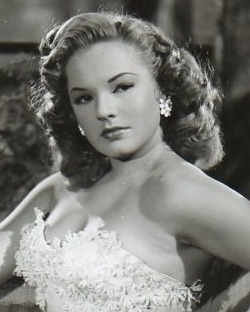
- Romand in 1953
- Born: Georgina García y Tamargo; 15 February 1938; Havana, Cuba
- Died: 3 December 2022 (aged 84); Mexico City, Mexico
- Occupation: Actress

Gina Romand (born Georgina García y Tamargo; 15 February 1938 – 3 December 2022) was a Cuban-Mexican actress. At the time of her death she was one of the last stars from the Golden Age of Mexican cinema.

== Life and career ==
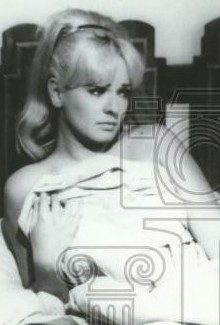
Romand in Dios te salve, psiquiatra (1966)

Romand was born as Georgina García y Tamargo on 15 February 1938 in Havana, Cuba. Her artistic career began in her native country as a star vedette of the Tropicana nightclub. Later she would move to the United States to dance in the show "La Parisien" held at the Casino de Paris, located in Las Vegas, Nevada. Later she would travel to Mexico, a country where she would start a career as an actress. She would make her film debut when she was barely fifteen years old in I Am Very Macho (1953). On 7 October 1954, she would embark on a trip back to the United States. During this stay in the country, she filmed the 1959 film Catch Me If You Can, co-produced with her native Cuba and in which she was only given a small supporting role.

She was nominated for an Ariel Award for Best Supporting Actress for her portrayal of Natalia “Kiki” Herrera Calles in the biopic of singer José José, Gavilán o Paloma (1985).

== Personal life and death ==
In 1966, she married Mexican theater producer Salvador Varela. Together they had three children, a girl named Georgina del Carmen Varela García, who is also an actress and singer as Gina Varela, and two boys, Gabriel Varela and Francisco, who died in 2001 at the age of 33 in a car accident. Her husband died on 8 August 2020.

Five days after her husband's death, Romand suffered a heart attack, for which she had to be rushed to a hospital, where her life was in danger, but she eventually managed to recover. In October of the same year, she was hospitalized again and her children had to ask for blood donors to save her life. After having been hospitalized for several days at the end of November 2022, she died on 3 December 2022 at the age of 84.

== Selected filmography ==
- I Am Very Macho (1953)
- Catch Me If You Can (1959)
- Immediate Delivery (1963)
- Los astronautas (1964)
- The Candy Man (1969)
- Las golfas (1969)
- Fray Don Juan (1970)
- Gavilán o Paloma (1985)
