= Pedro Páramo (1967 film) =

1967 film by Carlos Velo

- Directed by: Carlos Velo
- Written by: Manuel Barbachano Ponce; Carlos Fuentes; Juan Rulfo; Carlos Velo
- Produced by: Federico Amérigo; Manuel Barbachano Ponce; Felipe Subervielle
- Starring: John Gavin
- Cinematography: Gabriel Figueroa
- Edited by: Gloria Schoemann
- Music by: Joaquín Gutiérrez Heras
- Distributed by: Cimex
- Release date: 17 January 1967
- Running time: 110 minutes
- Country: Mexico
- Language: Spanish

Pedro Páramo is a 1967 Mexican drama film directed by Carlos Velo. It was entered into the 1967 Cannes Film Festival. It is based on the short novel of the same name by Juan Rulfo, with a screenplay partly by Carlos Fuentes.

== Cast ==
- John Gavin as Pedro Páramo
- Ignacio López Tarso as Fulgor Sedano
- Pilar Pellicer as Susana San Juan
- Carlos Fernández as Juan Preciado
- Julissa as Ana Rentería
- Graciela Doring as Damiana Cisneros
- Augusto Benedico as Padre Rentería
- Beatriz Sheridan as Eduviges Diada
- Claudia Millán as Dolores Preciado
- Rosa Furman as Dorotea la Cuarraca
- Joaquín Martínez as Abundio Martínez
- Jorge Russek as El Tilcuate
- Eric del Castillo as Perseverancio
- Amparo Villegas as Madre Villa
- Graciela Lara
- Alfonso Arau as Saltaperico

== Production ==
John Gavin was best known for appearing in films produced by Ross Hunter. He had a Mexican mother and said he made this film "so I could make something I was proud of". He was first asked to make the film by Fuentes in 1962. Gavin:

In Mexico, Pedro Páramo is as important as Don Quixote is in Spain. This may sound grandiose but it can be compared with Dante's Divine Inferno or Goethe's Faust. It is the journey of a young man in search of his father but, as an allegory, it is man in search of himself... It's the biggest Mexican film ever made.

Co-star Ignacio López Tarso described the decision to cast Gavin as a serious mistake: "The cast was very good, except for the main character."

== Release ==
The film was presented at the Cannes Film Festival in 1967 and released in Mexico and the US the same year.

== Reception ==
Despite the high expectations that surrounded its release, the film was not a success. It was poorly received at Cannes and Rulfo himself described it as "a very bad film". Velo said he was frustrated with the result because, despite its magnificent script and stupendous actors, it was "subjected to a flattening in its production, to a hateful level of industrial mediocrity".
