= Sor Tequila =

- Written by: Rogelio A. González
- Screenplay by: Fernando Galiana; Adolfo Martínez Solares; Gilberto Martínez Solares
- Produced by: Fernando de Fuentes Jr.
- Cinematography: Fernando Colín
- Edited by: Ignacio Chiu
- Music by: Ernesto Cortázar Jr.
- Release date: 1977
- Country: Mexico
- Language: Spanish

Sor Tequila (English: Sister Tequila) is a 1977 Mexican comedy film starring María Elena Velasco and Chilean comedian Lucho Navarro. TV guide described its premise as follows: "An Indian nun stumbles into a series of hilarious misadventures".

== Plot ==
Frantic and playful Franciscan nun María Nicolasa Cruz is sent by her abbess to a small town called Tlacahuixtla de Dos Santos. Despite their knowledge, the abbess is not allowed to forewarn María of an austere and eccentric Jesuit priest named Domingo who is the most powerful figure in town. After being told by his helper Jeronimo Pantoja about María and her open intention to restore and reopen the Catholic church, Domingo decides she must leave and does lots of antics to her. María's persistence and dismissal of such attacks makes Domingo realize that she may not be an easy target as he though. When María enters the town's annual festivities, winning them all, Domingo becomes desperate, asking for his niece to bring him lots of Boldo tea to presumably relax.

After encountering Domingo's niece Patricia who is going to marry a divorcee, María goes and gives Domingo a "serenade" asking him to let the couple be together. Domingo retaliates by throwing a bucket of water to María, laughing maniacally afterwards. After this María seeks help to restore the church from the town prisoners, but Jeronimo Pantoja, who is also the chief of police, jail director and group leader, who is Domingo's helper, is what stands in the way. As such he sabotages her attempt but after a crazy pastry fight María and the prisoners leave.

Domingo is later seen by Patricia after she declares she wants his blessing for her upcoming wedding. He is furious at her because he is against her marry a divorced person. He then gets a sharp chest pain. After attempting to use a helicopter to carry Domingo to a hospital, he is sent to a clinic. After thinking he had a heart attack, María then reveals what hurt Domingo was too much Boldo tea.

After mass, he redirects his attention to the town's people, stating his regret at his former conduct and giving his blessing to Patricia and her fianceé Ignacio. Due to his behavior, he reveals his intention to step down as the town's priest and give leeway to María, but she reveals that everyone does cherish him regardless. Touched, he leaves but his new resolutions are tested as María steps on his cassock, ripping it. As he comically tries to withhold his anger, a vulture lands in his hand as María nervously smiles.

== Cast ==
- María Elena Velasco as María Nicolasa Cruz
- Lucho Navarro as Father Domingo
- Lupita Pallás as Patricia's mother
- Flor Trujillo as Patricia
- Jorge Lavat as Ignacio
- Carlos Bravo y Fernández (Carhillos) as Town Barber

== Release ==
The film was a box-office success in Mexico.

== Themes ==
Sor Tequila 's main character is "a quick-witted Indian heroine whose antics subvert the cinematic stereotype of passive, self-sacrificing women." Various sources associate the character with the Virgin Mary.

The scene of the donkey beauty contest has been described as "brilliant, almost delirious".
