= Enrique Carrera Vega =

Mexican politician and trade unionist

Member of the Congress of Sonora Plurinominal
- In office 1982–1985

Personal details
- Born: 26 March 1957 Choix, Sinaloa, Mexico
- Died: 25 April 2015 (aged 58) Hermosillo, Sonora, Mexico
- Party: PSUM
- Children: 2
- Education: El Quinto Rural Normal School; Higher School of Nayarit

Enrique Carrera Vega (26 March 1957 – 25 April 2015) was a Mexican politician and trade unionist. He served in the L Legislature of the Congress of Sonora from 1982 to 1985 as a member of the now-defunct Unified Socialist Party of Mexico (PSUM).

After the disappearance of the PSUM, Carrera Vega joined the Party of the Socialist Revolution (PRS) and ran for Governor of Sonora in 1991 with the support of the Labor Party (PT). Outside of politics, he continued fighting for workers' rights, especially for field workers.

== Biography ==
Carrera Vega was born in Choix, Sinaloa on 26 March 1957. He earned his degree in education from the El Quinto Rural Normal School in Chucárit, Sonora before specializing in psychology and mathematics at the Higher School of Nayarit in Tepic, Nayarit.

Carrera Vega joined the Unified Socialist Party of Mexico (PSUM). He served in the L Legislature of the Congress of Sonora from 1982 to 1985 via proportional representation, becoming the first member of the PSUM to serve in the body. After the disappearance of the PSUM, Carrera Vega joined the Party of the Socialist Revolution (PRS) and formed part of its central committee. He ran for Governor of Sonora in the 1991 election and was endorsed by the Labor Party (PT).

Carrera Vega then served as general secretary of the General Union of Workers and Peasants of Mexico (UGOCM). In 1993, Carrera Vega founded the Central Unitaria de Trabajadores (CUT) and served as its secretary general. He later directed the Sonora Consejo Sindical y Social Permanente (CSSPES) from 2002 to 2011 and subsequently served as the organization's technical secretary.

Carrera died in Hermosillo on 25 April 2015; he was survived by his daughters, Nicté-Ha and Itzayana.
