= Leonorilda Ochoa =

Mexican actress and comedian (1939–2016)

- Born: Leonorilda Ochoa Pagaza; 30 October 1939; Mexico City, Mexico
- Died: 22 May 2016 (aged 76)
- Occupations: Actress, comedian
- Years active: 1953–2007
- Children: 2
- Website: www.leonorildaochoa.com

Leonorilda Ochoa Pagaza (30 October 1939 – 22 May 2016) was a Mexican actress and comedian who appeared in film since the Golden Age of Mexican cinema, television, and theatre productions. She became famous her role of La Pecas in the films Los Beverly de Peralvillo (1971) y Que familia tan cotorra! (1973), and also in the sitcom Los nuevos Beverlys (1996).

== Early life ==
Ochoa was born in Mexico City, the fourth of five children. Her father, Rubén Ochoa Silva, was a violinist and bassist who played in the philharmonic orchestra of Mexico City. She made her debut at the age of 14 in various broadcasts of Los aficionados, a program which was broadcast by the XEW radio station. She also studied accounting for two years.

== Career ==
One of her first professional jobs was as the showgirl for the Quinteto de los Hermanos Salinas. She then appeared in the pioneering television programs Variedades del mediodía (1954), starring Manuel "El Loco" Valdés, and Cómicos y canciones (1956), starring Viruta and Capulina. Her breakthrough in television came in the sitcom Chucherías (1962), which also starred Chucho Salinas, Héctor Lechuga, and Alejandro Suárez. However, her most successful television role is that of La Pecas, the wife of Guillermo Rivas' character, in Los Beverly de Peralvillo, a sitcom about a large family.

In 1967, she was nominated for the Silver Goddess Award for Best Supporting Actress for Despedida de soltera (1966). She starred opposite Gaspar Henaine "Capulina" in Capulina Speedy González (1970). She also reprised her role of La Pecas in the films Los Beverly de Peralvillo (1971) and Que familia tan cotorra! (1973) and in the sitcom Los nuevos Beverlys (1996).

Her last appearances were in the telenovelas Rubí (2004) and Código postal (2006-2007). She died of Alzheimer's disease at the age of 78 in 2016.

== Filmography ==
=== Film ===
- El dengue del amor (1965)
- La alegría de vivir (1965) - Lupe
- Despedida de soltera (1966) - Laura
- Amor a ritmo de go go (1966) - Leonor
- Los años verdes (1967)
- Novias impacientes (1967) - Rosita
- Caballos de acero (1967)
- Amor en las nubes (1968)
- Muñecas peligrosas (1969) - Leonor
- Con licencia para matar (1969) - Leonor
- Romance sobre ruedas (1969)
- Cazadores de espías (1969) - Leonorilda Ochoa
- Capulina Speedy Gonzalez (1970) - Rosita Smith
- La mujer de oro (1970)
- Los Beverly de Peralvillo (1971) - La Pecas
- La cigueña si es un bicho (1971)
- Que familia tan cotorra! (1973) - La Pecas
- Cinco nacos asaltan Las Vegas (1987)
- Raptola, violola y matola (1989)
- Oficio: Golfa (1990)
- No tan virgen (1991)
- Abuelita de Bakman (1993) - Esposa Politico
- El superman... Dilon (1993)

=== Television ===
- Los Beverly de Peralvillo (1968-1973) - La Pecas
- Alcanzar una estrella (1991) - Soledad 'Chole' Patiño
- Mujer, casos de la vida real (1997-2003)
- Vivo por Elena (1998) - Aurora
- Rubí (2004) - Dolores Herrera Guzmán'Doña Lola'
- Código postal (2006-2007) - Chuyita (final appearance)
