= El médico módico =

- Directed by: Gilberto Martínez Solares
- Screenplay by: Miguel Zacarías
- Story by: Mario Vaena
- Produced by: Miguel Zacarías
- Starring: Gaspar Henaine; Nora Larraga
- Cinematography: Alex Phillips, Sr.
- Music by: Sergio Guerrero
- Production company: Estudios Churubusco
- Distributed by: Producciones Zacarías
- Release date: August 12, 1971 (Mexico)
- Running time: 83 minutes
- Country: Mexico
- Language: Spanish

El médico módico ("The Moderate Doctor") is a 1971 Mexican comedy film directed by Gilberto Martínez Solares and produced by Miguel Zacarías. It is the ninth film starring Gaspar Henaine alone as Capulina (without Marco Antonio Campos as Viruta) and Karla.

== Cast ==
- Gaspar Henaine as Capulina
- Nora Larraga as Carmen (credited as Karla)
- Eric del Castillo as Luigi
- Óscar Ortiz de Pinedo as Don Arsenio
- Juan Gallardo as Juan
- Pancho Córdova as The Hospital Director
- Ramón G. Larrea as Eufemio Gallínazo (credited as Ramón Larrea)
- Betty Velázquez as The Cashier Nurse (credited as Bety Velázquez)
- Nathanael León as Luigi's Henchman (as Nothanael León)
- Juan Garza as Luigi's Henchman
- Armando Acosta as The Policeman
- Guillermo Bravo Sosa as Melquiádes (credited as Guillermo Bravo)
- Irma Torres as The Infarcted Woman
- Francisco Meneses as The Infarcted Woman's Husband
- Arturo Silva
