= Raquel Garza =

Mexican actress and comedian

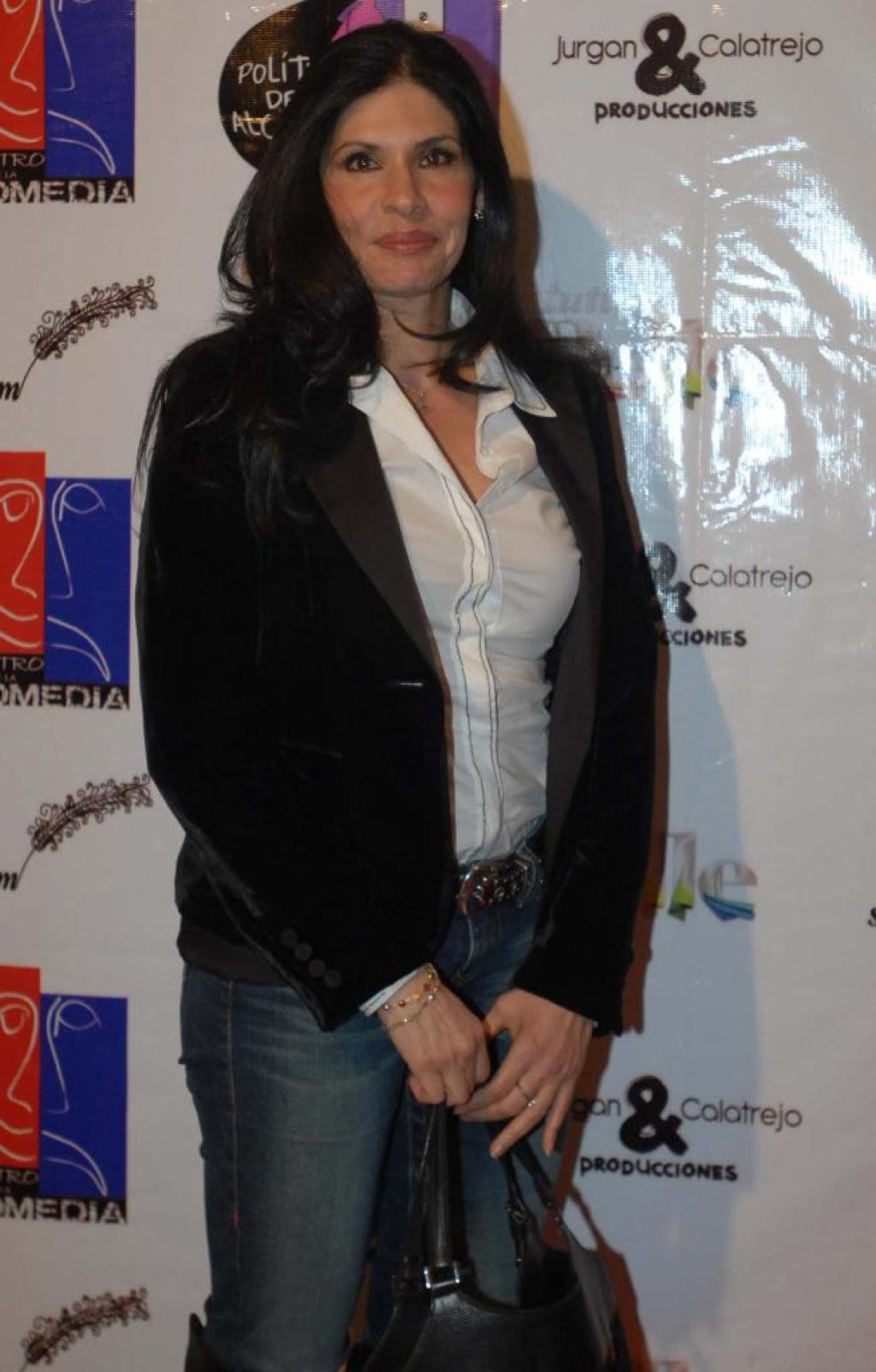
- Born: Tampico, Tamaulipas, Mexico
- Occupation: Actress
- Years active: 1997–present
- Spouse: Eduardo Alcobe (m. 1993)
- Children: 2

Raquel Garza is a Mexican actress and comedian.

== Personal life ==
She is married and has twins.

== Filmography ==
Television
| Year | Title | Role | Notes |
|---|---|---|---|
| 1997 | Gente bien | Martita | Supporting role |
| 2000–04 | Mujer, casos de la vida real | | Episode: "El silencio de Dios"; Episode: "Niña madre" Episode: "El derecho del parto " Episode: "Heridas mortales" Episode: "Mentiras navideñas" |
| 2002 | Las Vías del Amor | Teresa "Tere" | Supporting role |
| 2003 | Amor real | | uncredited |
| 2004 | Con todo | Tere "La Secretaria" | Protagonist |
| 2004 | La Oreja | Tere "La Secretaria" | Protagonist |
| 2004 | Big Brother VIP: México | Tere "La Secretaria" | Special appearance |
| 2004 | Otro rollo con: Adal Ramones | Tere "La Secretaria" | Special appearance |
| 2006–07 | La fea más bella | Sara Patiño | Supporting role |
| 2007 | Objetos perdidos | Various Characters | 8 episodes |
| 2007 | Amor sin maquillaje | | Supporting role |
| 2008 | Las tontas no van al cielo | Hortensia | Supporting role |
| 2009–10 | Atrévete a soñar | Nina | Antagonist |
| 2011 | Como dice el dicho | Lidia | Episode: "Season 1, Episode 26: Ten cuidado con lo que deseas" |
| 2012 | Miss XV: Sueña Princesa | Catalina de los Monteros / Galicia de García de Contreras | Special appearance |
| 2012–13 | Corona de lágrimas | Martina Durán | Supporting role |
| 2014–15 | Muchacha italiana viene a casarse | Adela | Supporting role |
| 2014 | La hija de Moctezuma | Brígida Troncoso | |
| 2015–16 | Pasión y poder | Petra/Samanta | Supporting role |
| 2018 | Tenías que ser tú | Amanda Topete | Co-Antagonist |
| 2018 | Amar a muerte | Bárbara | |
| 2019 | Médicos, línea de vida | Elena Estrada | Supporting role |
| 2024 | El precio de amarte | Perpetua Barrientos | |
| 2025 | Los hilos del pasado | Catalina | Supporting role |
