= Irma Dorantes =

Mexican actress

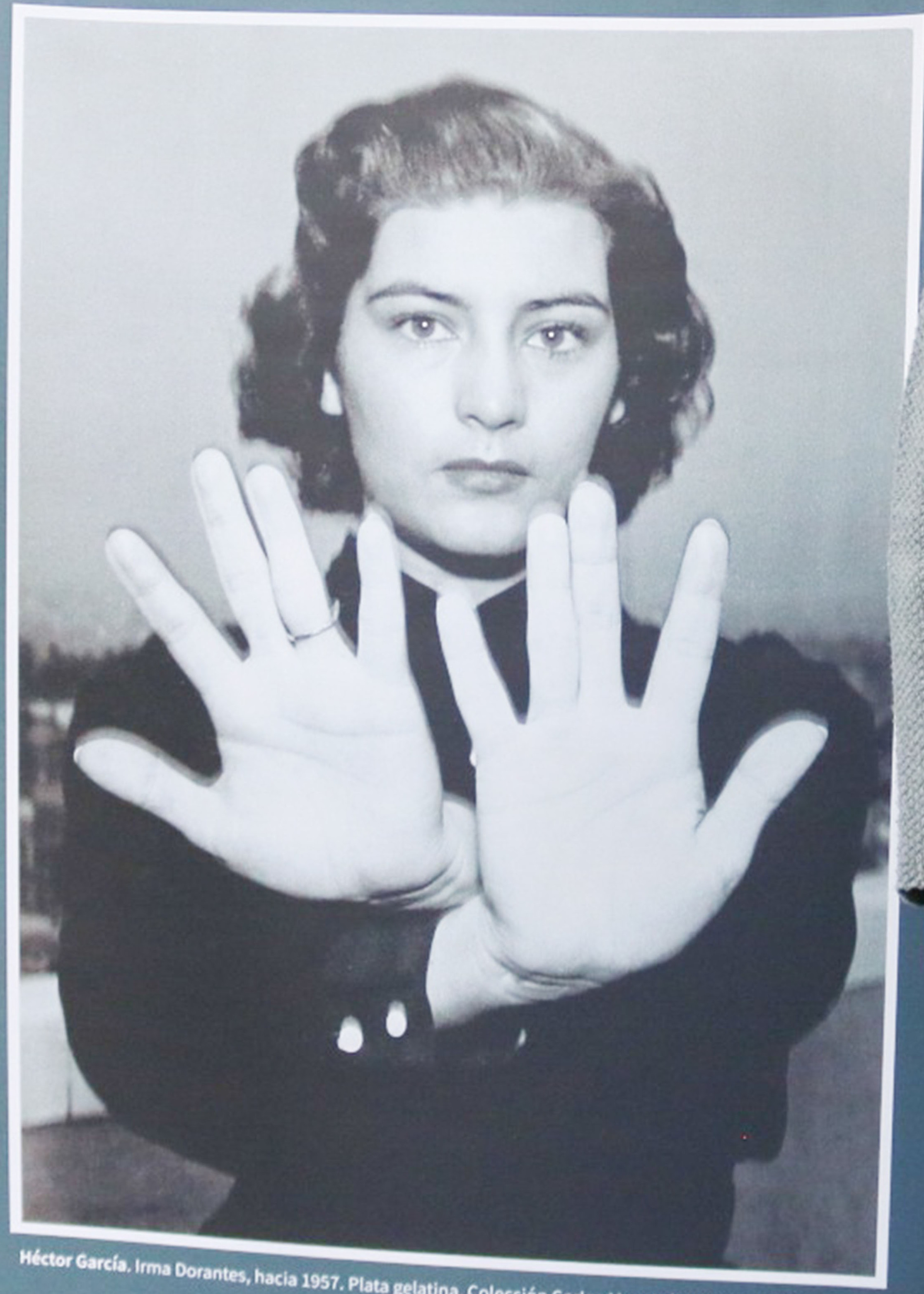
- Born: Irma Aguirre Martínez; 21 December 1934 (age 91); Mérida, Yucatán, Mexico
- Occupations: Actress and singer
- Years active: 1948–2014
- Partner: Pedro Infante (1949-1957)
- Children: 1

Irma Aguirre Martínez (born 21 December 1934), commonly known as Irma Dorantes, is a Mexican actress and singer, perhaps best remembered for her personal relationship with the also actor and singer Pedro Infante, with whom she appeared in various films, such as Los tres huastecos (1948), También de dolor se canta (1950), El Enamorado (1952), Now I Am Rich (1952), Anxiety (1953) and Pepe the Bull (1953).

== Career ==
Her first film, Los tres huastecos, was released in 1948. Dorantes participated in many Mexican films of the 1950s and 1960s. In 1963, she was nominated for a Silver Goddess Award for Best Supporting Actress for her performance in Sol en llamas (1962). Aside from acting, she is also a successful singer, obtaining gold and platinum records for her versions of the songs "Cuando no sé de ti", "Pequeña", "Ansiedad", "Recuerdos de Ipacarai", and "La Flor de la Canela". She was also known for her equestrian shows. In 1964, Dorantes and her horses Gatillo de Oro and Justiciero headed a touring company at the Million Dollar Theater in Los Angeles, California.

== Personal life ==
She met actor Pedro Infante in 1948 during the filming of Los 3 Huastecos. They married illegally in 1953, and their marriage was officially annulled on 9 April 1957. From their relationship they had one child, actress and singer Irma Infante.

== Selected filmography ==
- Los tres huastecos (1948)
- The Lady of the Veil (1949)
- A Galician in Mexico (1949)
- The Woman of the Port (1949)
- También de dolor se canta (1950)
- You Shall Not Covet Thy Son's Wife (1950)
- Doctor on Call (1950)
- Over the Waves (1950)
- Women Without Tomorrow (1951)
- The Cry of the Flesh (1951)
- El Enamorado (1952)
- Now I Am Rich (1952)
- Anxiety (1953)
- The Magnificent Beast (1953)
- Pepe the Bull (1953)
- Pablo and Carolina (1957)
- Juan Polainas (1960)
- El revólver sangriento (1964)
- Las delicias del poder (1999)
- La hija de Moctezuma (2014)
