= Rosita Bouchot =

Mexican actress and singer

- Born: Rosa Esther Gómez Bouchot; 30 August 1951 (age 74)
- Citizenship: Mexican
- Occupation: Actress

Rosa Esther Gómez Bouchot (born 30 August 1951), known as Rosita Bouchot, is a Mexican actress and singer. She has appeared in over fifty films during her career.

== Career ==
Bouchot played one of the versions of the character "Paty" in the Mexican sitcom El Chavo del Ocho. She took part in two episodes, which were remakes of previous ones.

Bouchot also worked with Manolo Fabregas in Fiddler on the Roof when it was produced in Mexico in the 1970s.

Bouchot worked for Chespirito in the 1970s. Later, she took part in episodes of El Chapulín Colorado. She has also appeared in Mexican telenovelas such as Triunfo del amor.

=== Movies ===
- Bienvenido paisano (2006)
- Tres huasnacos (1997)
- Bonita (1996)
- El supermán... Dilon dos (1995)
- El supermán... Dilon (1993)
- Nachas vemos vecinas no sabemos (1993)
- Las dos caras del diablo (1992)
- Chantaje al desnudo (1992)
- Mofles y Canek en máscara vs. cabellera (1992)
- Un asesino anda suelto (1991)
- El pozo del diablo (1990)
- Compadres a la Mexicana (1990)
- Oficio: Golfa (1990)
- El semental (1990)
- Con el odio en la piel (1988)
- El semental de Palo Alto (1988)
- Vuelven los mecánicos ardientes (1988)
- Solicito marido para engañar (1988)
- Los Psiquiatras Ardientes (1988)
- El cabaretero y sus golfas (1988)
- Pasaporte a la muerte (1988)
- Las zorras (1987)
- Niños sobre pedido (1987)
- Juventud rebelde (1987)
- Herencia de sangre (1987)
- El zapatero bailarín (1987)
- Testigo de un crimen (1987)
- Policía de narcóticos (1986)
- La celda del alacrán (1986)
- ¡Yerba sangrienta! (1986)
- Los mecánicos ardientes (1985)
- Entre hierba, polvo y plomo (1984)
- Corrupción (1984)
- Acorralado (1984)
- Burdel (1982)
- El color de nuestra piel (1981)
- Semana santa en Acapulco (1981)
- Intrépidos punks (1980)
- Juventud sin freno (1979)
- En esta primavera (1979)
- En la trampa (1979)
- Río de la muerte (1979)
- Cascabel (1977)
- El alegre divorciado (1976)
- La presidenta municipal (1975)
