= Ay María qué puntería =

- Starring: María Elena Velasco; Ruben Cerda; Carlos Gastelum; Adriana del Rio; Aidee Garcia; Adrian Ramos; Ernesto Pape; Alejandro Marquez
- Country of origin: Mexico
- Original language: Spanish
- No. of episodes: approx. 100

Production
- Producer: Gerardo L. Huillier
- Production location: Mexico City,
- Running time: 30 minutes

Original release
- Network: Canal de las Estrellas
- Release: 1998 – 2004

Related
- Las delicias de poder (1996)

Ay María qué puntería! (English: María, what an aim!) is a Mexican sitcom, from Televisa. It centers on the adventures of an indigenous Mexican woman named La India María, who works as a maid in Mexico City.

== Synopsis ==
When indigenous orange seller María Nicolasa Cruz is chased by a government inspector, she crosses paths with television producer and his crew. She is offered a job and soon becomes involved in many of their projects, leading to a series of comedic situation.

== Cast ==
- María Elena Velasco as María Nicolasa Cruz
- Carlos Gastelum as Estéban Spilman
- Rubén Cerda as Roque
- Ernesto Pape as Michel Lavalle
- Adrían Ramos as Sócrates Casiomero
- Adriana del Río as Ana María Chamorro Bueno, "Anilú"
- Aideé Gracia as Doña Macarena
- Alejandro Márquez as Chilango
