= Choix =

City in the Mexican state of Sinaloa

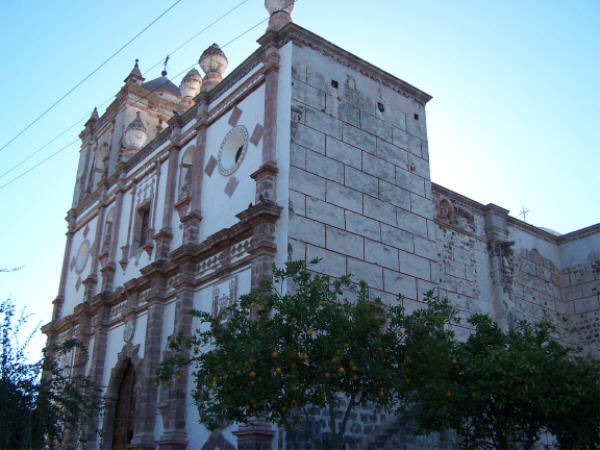

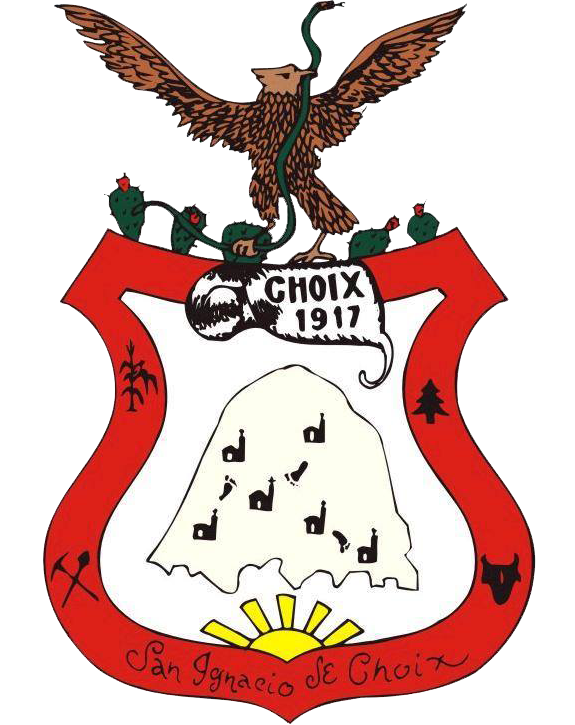
- Seal

- Location in Mexico Choix (Mexico)
- Coordinates: 26°42′31″N 108°19′31″W
- Country: Mexico
- State: Sinaloa
- Municipality: Choix
- Founded in: 1607
- Elevation: 229 m (751 ft)

Population (2010)
  - Total: 9,306
- Time zone: UTC-7 (Mountain Standard Time)
- Postal code: 81700 to
- Website: www.choix.gob.mx

Choix (Spanish pronunciation: [ˈtʃojks]) is a small city in the Mexican state of Sinaloa. It is the municipal seat of Choix Municipality and is located inland, in the northernmost corner of the state. The city reported 9,305 inhabitants in the 2010 census. It contains the locality Sauzadebaca.

== Notable people ==
- Enrique Carrera Vega, politician and trade unionist
- José Ángel Espinoza, actor
