= La ciudad de los niños =

- Starring: Sara García
- Release date: 1957
- Running time: 115 minute
- Country: Mexico
- Language: Spanish

La ciudad de los niños ("The City of the Children") is a 1957 Mexican film. It stars Sara García, Carlos Rivas, Eduardo Fajardo and Oscar Pulido. it was directed by Gilberto Martinez Solares and scripted by Julio Alejandro.
