= Anxiety (1953 film) =

1953 film by Miguel Zacarías

- Directed by: Miguel Zacarías
- Written by: Edmundo Báez; Miguel Zacarías
- Starring: Pedro Infante; Libertad Lamarque; Irma Dorantes
- Cinematography: Gabriel Figueroa
- Edited by: José W. Bustos
- Music by: Manuel Esperón
- Production company: Producciones Zacarías
- Release date: 1 October 1953
- Running time: 107 minutes
- Country: Mexico
- Language: Spanish

Anxiety (Spanish: Ansiedad) is a 1953 Mexican musical drama film directed by Miguel Zacarías and starring Pedro Infante, Libertad Lamarque and Irma Dorantes. It was shot at the Churubusco Studios in Mexico City. The film's sets were designed by the art director Javier Torres Torija.

== Cast ==
- Pedro Infante as Carlos Iturbe y Valdivia / Gabriel Lara / Rafael Lara
- Libertad Lamarque as María de Lara
- Irma Dorantes as Isabel Valdivia
- Arturo Soto Rangel as Don Lorenzo
- Guillermo Samperio as Policia
- Salvador Quiroz as Doctor
- José Muñoz as Asesino
- Miguel Funes hijo as Rafaelito
- Hernán Vera as Cantinero 1
- Felipe Montoya as Agente teatral
- Jorge Sareli as Investigador privado
- Chel López as Taxista
- José Pidal as Invitado a fiesta
- Marion de Lagos as Enfermera
- Ricardo Adalid as Locutor radio
- Manuel Casanueva as Invitado a fiesta
- Velia Lupercio as Invitada a fiesta
- Concepción Martínez as Espectadora programa de radio
- Carlos Robles Gil as Espectador programa radio
- Humberto Rodríguez as Empleado teatro

== Bibliography ==
- Amador, María Luisa. Cartelera cinematográfica, 1950-1959. UNAM, 1985.
