= The Chinese Room (film) =

1968 Mexican mystery film

The Chinese Room is a 1966 Mexican mystery and melodrama film directed by the American filmmaker Albert Zugsmith. It starred Guillermo Murray, Elizabeth Campbell, Carlos Rivas, and Cathy Crosby.

The film revolves around a doctor (Murray) "who uses unorthodox methods to cure a drug-addicted family".

== Production ==
It was based on a novel by Vivien Connell.

According to Cathy Crosby, she became ill during the filming and had to swim to shore from the boat they were rehearsing on.

== Reception ==
The film was described as a "mixture of melodrama , mystery and horror around various situations related to adultery and crime" . It was called "appalling rubbish" by Emilio Garcia Riera in his Brief History of Mexican Film.
