= Los Beverly de Peralvillo =

- Genre: Sitcom
- Written by: Mauricio Kleiff
- Directed by: Antonio Fernández
- Starring: Guillermo Rivas; Leonorilda Ochoa; Arturo Castro; Amparo Arozamena
- Country of origin: Mexico
- Original language: Spanish
- No. of seasons: 5
- No. of episodes: Approx. 120

Production
- Running time: 30 minutes
- Production companies: Televisión Independiente de México (now Televisa)

Original release
- Release: 28 October 1969 – 6 January 1973

Related
- Los nuevos Beverly

Los Beverly de Peralvillo is a Mexican sitcom that copied its similar name as a spoof from "The Beverly Hillbillies" that originally had aired from 1962 to 1971. Meanwhile, Los Beverly De Peralvillo aired from 1969 to 1973, including 2 motion pictures based on the Television show. It stars Guillermo Rivas, Leonorilda Ochoa, Arturo Castro, and Amparo Arozamena as the main characters.

The series was a success and spawned two films, Los Beverly de Peralvillo (1971) and ¡Qué familia tan cotorra! (1973), and a follow-up series, Los nuevos Beverly.

== Premise ==
El Borras is a taxi driver who falls in love with La Pecas. Not knowing that her shiftless family is waiting for someone to support them, Borras gladly marries her. Doña Chole, Pecas' mother, reveals the truth and forces Borras to provide for the whole family; Borras begins to detest her and calls her "La Tarantula". Borras relies on the help of his mustached friend, El Bigotón, who instantly becomes enamored of Doña Chole. El Comanche, the policeman who issues Borras' traffic citations, also falls in love with Doña Chole. The family lives in Colonia Peralvillo, a poor Mexico City neighborhood.

== Cast and characters ==
- Guillermo Rivas as El Borras
- Leonorilda Ochoa as La Pecas
- Arturo Castro as El Bigotón
- Amparo Arozamena as Doña Chole
- Sergio Ramos as El Comanche
- César González as El Abuelo

== Production ==
The series premiered on 28 October 1969 at 8:30 p.m. The series' intro billed the actors in this order: Rivas, Ochoa, Castro, and Arozamena; each character told an individual joke just before their credit appeared. The episodes were filmed in black-and-white until mid-1971, when they changed to color.

== List of episodes ==
Season 1 (1969)

1. Released 28 October 1969
2. Released 4 November 1969
3. Released 9 December 1969
4. Released 16 December 1969
5. Released 23 December 1969

== Impact ==
The sitcom could be assumed to be the forerunner of "comedic dysfunctional family" sitcoms of Mexico such as La familia P. Luche and Una familia de diez.

== DVD releases ==
In 2006, 20 episodes of the series were released in two disc packages by Televisa Home Entertainment. The first DVD is "Los Beverly de Peralvillo Vol. 1" and the second is "Los Beverly de Peralvillo Vol. 2", both contain ten episodes. The DVDs' special features include a photo gallery and an interview with the series' writer, Mauricio Kleiff.
