= Maru Dueñas =

Mexican actress, director and producer

- Born: María Eugenia Dueñas Posadas; October 3, 1967; Mexico City, Mexico
- Died: November 11, 2017 (aged 50); Cuernavaca, Morelos, Mexico
- Occupations: Actress, director, producer
- Years active: 1990–2017

Maru Dueñas (born María Eugenia Dueñas Posadas; October 3, 1967 – November 11, 2017) was a Mexican actress, director and producer.

Dueñas studied at the Andrés Soleracademy and later at the Centro de Educación Artística of Televisa in 1986.

== Death ==
Dueñas died in a car accident on November 11, 2017, when the truck in which she was traveling, owned by the Televisa company, hit a truck at kilometer 46 of the Mexico-Cuernavaca highway. The director Claudio Reyes Rubio, son of the Mexican actress María Rubio, also died in the accident.

== Filmography ==
=== Television ===
- Cenizas y diamantes (1990) as Cuquín
- Ángeles blancos (1990/91)
- Más allá del puente (1993) as Carmelita
- La vida en risa (1994)
- La chuchufleta (1995)
- Todo de todo (1997)
- La Güereja y algo más (1998)
- Diversión desconocida (1998/99)
- Las delicias del poder (1999)
- La casa en la playa (2000) as Nina López
- Mujer, casos de la vida real (2002/16) 20 episodes
- El terreno de Eva (2003)
- Piel de otoño (2004)
- La fea más bella (2006) as Nurse
- Alma de hierro (2008/09) as Sonia
- La rosa de Guadalupe (2008/12) 36 episodes
- Los Simuladores (2009)
- Ellas son... la alegría del hogar (2009)
- Lo que la vida me robó (2014) as Zulema
- Tres veces Ana (2016) as Cecilia
- Como dice el dicho (2017) 3 episodes

=== Films ===
- Hasta morir (1994) as Diana

=== Theatre ===
- La jaula de las locas
- A Chorus Line
- Cats
- Las bodas de Fígaro
- Un tipo con suerte
- La isla del tesoro
- El príncipe feliz
- La leyenda del beso
- Nosotras que nos queremos tanto
- Gypsy (musical)
- Expreso astral
- Adorables enemigas
- Orgasmos
- Solo quiero hacerte feliz
- Placer o no ser
- Scherezada
- Nosotras que nos queremos tanto
- El show de Jerry Lewis sin Jerry Lewis
- La misma gata pero con botas

=== Short films ===
- Letras capitales (1993)
- La crisálida (1996)

== Direction ==
- Papi piernas largas (2017)

=== Dialogue ===
- Lo que la vida me robó (2013/14)
- Tres veces Ana (2016)
- 1st part of Me declaro culpable (2017)

== Production ==
- En busca de una familia feliz (1986)
- Cinexxxitarse (1996)
