= La India María =

María Nicolasa Cruz
- La India María as depicted in Tonta tonta pero no tanto (1972)
- First appearance: "Tonta tonta pero no tanto" (1972)
- Last appearance: "La hija de Moctezuma" (2014)
- Portrayed by: María Elena Velasco (1972-2015)

In-universe information
- Nickname: La India María
- Gender: female
- Occupation: Housemaid, farmer, public vendor, artisan, politician
- Relatives: Yaqueline (sister); Lupe (sister); Eufemia (cousin); Chencha (cousin) "Tata" (grandfather) don Macario (foster father) doña "Chona" (foster mother)

"La India María" (born María Nicolasa Cruz) is character popular in Mexican media portrayed and created by actress María Elena Velasco. The character frequently endures situations of racial discrimination, classism, and corruption, although in all of these turmoils, María undoubtedly resolves them with hilarious acts of good-nature and morality. She has represented the poor indigenous, the migrant worker, the forsaken woman, and even free-spirited nuns for over 30 years. She has been the lead character in 16 films and in a spin-off television series entitled, Ay María Qué Puntería. Most recently, the character has appeared in cameo appearances in the television programs Mujer, casos de la vida real and La Familia Peluche.

== Fictional character background ==
In her first film, she mentions that her hometown is "San José de los Burros". Nevertheless, different hometowns are suggested in other films. For example, her hometown is changed to "Chipitongo el Alto", for which she serves a term as municipal president in La presidenta municipal (1975). In El que no corre... vuela! (1981), she mentions her hometown as "San Pablo Cuatro Venados". Other given hometowns are Nopalillo (Little Prickly Pear Cactus), San Bartolo Tezmelucan, among others.

== Characteristics ==
Despite being an illiterate woman and very prone to mistakes, La India Maria has shown to be of quick wit and even of impressive athletic ability, being able to fend off enemies with karate like abilities. Many people try to take advantage of her good nature and some unfortunately get away with it. However in the end she manages to defeat even powerful villains with her good intentions and ability to turn their influence against them.

== Commute to Mexico City ==
Since La India María's rural hometown does not have many job opportunities, her cousin Eufemia invites her to work for a sophisticated aristocratic woman who is the countess of Valley of Mexico, in Mexico City. Her name is Doña Julia Escandón de León, Condesa del Valle. But María is robbed right when she gets off her train. With nowhere to go, María sells oranges with other women at a public park (which is illegal). A group of police officers arrest them, but María Nicolasa finds refuge in Doña Julia's limousine.

== Migration to the United States ==
María was hired several times to work in the United States. First in OK, Mister Pancho, where she crosses the border to Houston, Texas at the request of an American refugee with whom she quickly falls in love and names "Mr. Pancho". Second in Ni de aquí ni de allá, she travels to Los Angeles, California and is contracted to work as a housemaid for two American tourists, Mr. and Mrs. Wilson. However, she is distracted and goes into a bathroom at the airport in L. A., and witnesses a murder. The murderer pursues her all over the city, as she finds work in a Mexican restaurant, and then as a maid for a sick American entrepreneur, who ends up being a drug trafficker that is arrested at the end.

== Cameo appearances ==
- In Mujer, casos de la vida real, an episode entitled Amor incondicional, she portrays a discriminated maid and nanny.
- In La Familia Peluche, she appears in an episode as the housemaid of "Exelsa".

She also had cameos in the dramedy series Papá Soltero and the comedy show La hora pico.

=== List of Films ===
Year	Title	Role	Notes
1972	Tonta, tonta, pero no tanto	María Nicolasa Cruz	First India María film
1973	¡Pobre, pero honrada!	María Nicolasa Cruz	
1974	La madrecita	Sor María Nicolasa Cruz	
1975	La presidenta municipal	María Nicolasa Cruz	
1976	El miedo no anda en burro	María Nicolasa Cruz	
1977	Sor Tequila	María Nicolasa "Sor Tequila"	
1978	Duro pero seguro	María Nicolasa Cruz	
1978	La comadrita	María Nicolasa Cruz	
1981	Okey, Mister Pancho	María Nicolasa Cruz	
1982	¡El que no corre... vuela!	María Nicolasa Cruz	Silver Goddess Award for Best Comedy Performance
1983	El coyote emplumado	María	Directorial debut
1984	Ni Chana, Ni Juana	María	
1988	Ni de aquí, ni de allá	María	
1993	Se equivocó la cigüeña	María Nicolasa Cruz	
1999	Las delicias del poder	María / Lorena Barriga	
2014	La hija de Moctezuma	María Nicolasa Cruz	Nominated – Silver Goddess Award for Best Original Song
