= Arturo Castro (Mexican actor) =

Mexican actor (1918–1975)

- Born: Arturo Castro Rivas Cacho; March 21, 1918; Mexico City, Mexico
- Died: March 6, 1975 (aged 56); Mexico City, Mexico
- Other names: El Bigotón
- Occupation: Character actor
- Spouse: Rosaura Hernández
- Children: Benito Castro; Victoria Castro; Ana María Castro

Arturo Castro Rivas Cacho (March 21, 1918 – March 6, 1975) was a Mexican character actor who was often credited and nicknamed as "El Bigotón," due to his distinctive mustache.

== Film career ==
Arturo Castro's film career spanned four decades and he is probably best remembered for appearing in eleven Viruta and Capulina feature films. He also appeared in the 1964 Cantinflas film El padrecito as Nepomuceno, a peasant who wishes to name his newborn son after himself, but Cantinflas disapproves of his name and refuses to baptize the child.

== Personal life ==
Arturo Castro was Benito Castro's father, Gualberto Castro's uncle, telenovela actress Daniela Castro's great-uncle, and Lupe Rivas Cacho's nephew. He was born and died in Mexico City, Mexico.

== Selected filmography ==
- Los chiflados del rock and roll (1957)
- Miércoles de ceniza (1958)
- El rey del tomate (1963)
- El padrecito (1964)
- Los Beverly de Peralvillo (1971)
- Que familia tan cotorra! (1973)

== Television work ==
- Los Beverly de Peralvillo (1968–1973)
