= Óscar Ortiz de Pinedo =

Cuban-Mexican actor

Óscar Ortiz de Pinedo (November 2, 1910 – December 13, 1978), was a Cuban actor and comedian, best remembered for his numerous roles as eccentric businessmen in different films from the Golden Age of Mexican cinema. Married to actress Lupita Pallás, he was the father of the comedian and actor Jorge Ortiz de Pinedo.

== Selected filmography ==
- What Idiots Men Are (1951)
- School for Tramps (1955)
- The Sin of Being a Woman (1955)
- Drop the Curtain (1955)
- Look What Happened to Samson (1955)
- Barefoot Sultan (1956)
- The King of Mexico (1956)
- Las aventuras de Pito Pérez (1957)
- Every Child a Cross to Bear (1957)
- Rebel Without a House (1960)
- Adventures of Joselito and Tom Thumb (1960)
- Three Black Angels (1960)
- El analfabeto (1961)
- La cigüeña distraída (1966)
- Qué hombre tan sin embargo (1967)
- El médico módico (1971)
- La madrecita (1974)
- El miedo no anda en burro (1976)
