= La comadrita =

- Starring: Sara García
- Release date: 27 September 1978
- Country: Mexico
- Language: Spanish

La comadrita ("The Child's Godmother") is a 1978 Mexican film directed by Fernando Cortés and starring María Elena Velasco, Fernando Soler, and Sara García. The film is about an indigenous woman who baptizes nearly all the animals on the day of the "blessing of animals" in the town. That is why she is nicknamed La comadrita, for being the godmother of the townspeople's animals.

== Cast ==
- María Elena Velasco - María Nicolasa / Doña Nicole Pérez Rodríguez de Papatzi
- Fernando Soler - Don Macario
- Sara García - Doña Chona / Madamé Choné
- Pedro Infante Jr. - Pedro Ramírez / Pedro de Alvarado
- Yolanda Ochoa - Lupe
- Rafael Inclán - Atanacio
- Beatriz Adriana - Irma de Achavál
- Marcela López Rey - Marcela de Cobián
- Fernando Larrañaga - Pablo Cobián
- Polo Ortín - Policía
- Carlos Agostí - don Cesar de Achával y Achával
- Gloria Jordán - María Antonieta de Achával
- Raúl Martínez
- Carlos Rotzinger - Peter, jefe de espías
- Antonio Moreno
- Carlos Bravo y Fernández - Sacerdote
- Jesús González Leal - don Felipe, presidente municipal de San Martín
- Gabriela de Fuentes - Gabrielita
- Gustavo del Castillo
- Benjamín Escamilla Espinosa
- Tomas Velasco
- Federico González

== See also ==
- Blessing of animals
