= Arturo Silva =

American novelist

- Occupations: Writer and teacher
- Writing career
- Language: English
- Notable works: Tokio Whip, Philosophy of the Shirt

Arturo Silva is an American-born novelist, editor, and teacher. His notable works include Tokio Whip (2016) and Philosophy of the Shirt (1986). He was also the editor of The Donald Richie Reader (2001).

Silva currently resides in Vienna, Austria where he teaches and writes.
