= Pancho Córdova =

Mexican character actor (1916–1990)

- Born: Francisco Amado Córdova Ramírez; August 17, 1916; Pichucalco
- Died: March 7, 1990 (aged 73); Cuernavaca, Mexico
- Occupation: Actor
- Years active: 1951-1981
- Family: Natalia Cordova-Buckley (granddaughter)

Francisco Amado Córdova Ramírez (1916 – 1990) was a Mexican character actor who has appeared in numerous films of United States and Mexico.

== Personal life ==
He is the grandfather of actress Natalia Cordova-Buckley.

== Selected filmography ==
=== American films ===
- Butch Cassidy and the Sundance Kid (1969) - Bank Manager
- Two Mules for Sister Sara (1970) - Juan's father
- River of Gold - Priest (ABC Movie of the Week)
- The Wrath of God (1972) - Tacho
- The Long Goodbye (1973) - Doctor
- The Mansion of Madness (1973) - Pseudo-Marshal
- Once Upon a Scoundrel (1974) - Víctor Cruz

=== Mexican films ===
- The Guests of the Marquesa (1951)
- Los tres alegres compadres (1952) - (uncredited)
- Sí, mi vida (1953) - Locutor (uncredited)
- Fugitivos: Pueblo de proscritos (1955) - Juvencio
- El 7 leguas (1955) - Clavo (uncredited)
- Camino de Guanajuato (1955) - Director pelicula (uncredited)
- Caras nuevas (1956)
- Ay, Chaparros... ¡Cómo abundan! (1956)
- La locura del rock 'n roll (1957) - don Rubén
- Nunca me hagan eso (1957) - Director de pelicula
- La esquina de mi barrio (1957)
- Vuelve Chistelandia (1958)
- Nueva Chistelandia (1958)
- Chistelandia (1958)
- Échenme al gato (1958) - Doctor Pastrana
- Pepito y los robachicos (1958) - Entrenador
- Manos arriba (1958) - Don Alfredo
- The Boxer (1958) - Amigo borracho de don Chon
- Ama a tu prójimo (1958) - Chofer cruz roja (uncredited)
- Sabrás que te quiero (1958) - Pancho
- Una abuelita atómica (1958) - Sr. Ruanova
- Vivir del cuento (1959) - Coronel Gumaro Escamilla
- El cofre del pirata (1959)
- El cariñoso (1959) - Amigo de Raúl
- Mi niño, mi caballo y yo (1959)
- Las coronelas (1959) - Corneta
- Nacida para amar (1959)
- La pandilla se divierte (1959)
- La pandilla en acción (1959) - Director pelicula (uncredited)
- Rebel Without a House (1960, adaptation)
- Tin Tan y las modelos (1960) - Don Pioquinto de la Garza
- Dos criados malcriados (1960) - El Buffalo
- Con quien andan nuestros locos (1961)
- Suerte te dé Dios (1961) - Don Chon
- Tres tristes tigres (1961) - Don Chon, comisario
- Mañana serán hombres (1961) - Miembro equipo rodaje
- Muchachas que trabajan (1961) - Don Joaquín, papá de Cora
- Aventuras del látigo negro (1961)
- Besito a Papa (1961) - Merolico
- Los hermanos Del Hierro (1961) - Hombre que contrata la muerte de Zeñn
- Carnaval en mi barrio (1961) - Coreógrafo
- Con la misma moneda (1961) - Don Miguel, comisario
- Juan sin miedo (1961) - Sabino
- Juventud sin Dios (La vida del padre Lambert) (1962) - Padre de Raymundo
- La marca del gavilán (1962) - Don Miguel, comisario
- El malvado Carabel (1962) - Francisco Olalla
- The Exterminating Angel (1962) - (uncredited)
- The Bloody Vampire (1962) - Justus
- El látigo negro contra los farsantes (1962) - Don Miguel
- La muerte pasa lista (1962) - Don Miguel, comisario
- Tlayucan (1962) - Rito, sacristán
- El tesoro del rey Salomón (1963) - Dios tigre
- Vuelven los Argumedo (1963) - (uncredited)
- La risa de la ciudad (1963) - Colocho
- Aventuras de las hermanas X (1963) - Vladimir
- Las vengadoras enmascaradas (1963)
- En la vieja California (1963) - Pancho
- Tin-Tan el hombre mono (1963) - Padre de Helen
- Los bravos de California (1963)
- Las hijas del Zorro (1964)
- La sonrisa de los pobres (1964)
- El mundo de las drogas (1964) - El rata
- En la mitad del mundo (1964)
- Historia de un canalla (1964) - Gerente
- Las invencibles (1964)
- Un gallo con espolones (Operación ñongos) (1964) - Jefe de Cachirulo y Copet (uncredited)
- Un ángel de mal genio (1964)
- Los hijos del condenado (1964)
- Tarahumara (Cada vez más lejos) (1965) - Don Celedonio
- El gángster (1965) - Ricky Rito
- Los dos cuatreros (1965)
- Los Sánchez deben morir (1966) - Comisario
- Tirando a gol (1966) - Médico
- ¿Qué haremos con papá? (1966)
- Esta noche no (1966) - don Agustin
- La soldadera (1966) - Padre de Lázara (uncredited)
- Rage (1966) - Old Man
- Guns for San Sebastian (1968) - Kino
- Agente 00 Sexy (1968) - Col. Gomez
- Los asesinos (1968) - Tom Foster
- Autopsia de un fantasma (1968) - Pinedo
- Lío de faldas (1969) - Médico (uncredited)
- Al rojo vivo (1969) - Borracho en burdel
- Cuando los hijos se van (1969) - Javier Ramírez
- La marcha de Zacatecas (1969) - Notario
- La puerta y la mujer del carnicero (1969) - Invitado (segment "La puerta")
- Romance sobre ruedas (1969)
- Tres amigos (1970) - Licenciado
- La guerra de las monjas (1970) - Raptor
- El oficio mas antiguo del mundo (1970) - Doctor
- La vida inútil de Pito Pérez (1970)
- Paraíso (1970) - Caguamo
- Siempre hay una primera vez (1971) - Javier's father (segment "Rosa")
- Jesús, nuestro Señor (1971) - Doctor
- El médico módico (1971) - Director del hospital
- Sin salida (1971) - Don Ceve
- El águila descalza (1971) - Encargado de Manicomio
- Los destrampados (1971)
- Tú, yo, nosotros (1972) - Padre de Julián
- Sucedió en Jalisco (1972) - Don Jesús
- Cayó de la gloria el diablo (1972) - Ingeniero
- Doña Macabra (1972) - Octavio
- Hay ángeles sin alas (1972) - Paul
- Los hijos de Satanás (1972)
- El vals sin fin (1972) - Bibliotecario
- El rincón de las vírgenes (1972) - Melesio Terrones
- Un pirata de doce años (1972)
- National Mechanics (1972) - El güero Corrales
- Apolinar (1972)
- Los cachorros (1973)
- Those Years (1973) - Sr. Jecker
- El bueno para nada (1973) - Benigno Saldaña
- Presagio (1974) - Padre Ángel
- Fe, esperanza y caridad (1974) - Jacobo (segment "Caridad")
- Calzonzin Inspector (1974) - Don Perpetuo del Rosal
- En busca de un muro (1974) - Fernando Galván
- La madrecita (1974) - Comisario
- Cristo te ama (1975)
- Tívoli (1975) - Quijanito
- Don Herculano enamorado (1975) - Don Herculano Zúñiga y Ponce de León
- La presidenta municipal (1975) - Mr. Peppermint
- Bellas de noche (1975)
- El alegre divorciado (1976) - Don Felipe Aguirre
- El rey (1976) - Governador Patrocinio del Rivero
- El niño y la estrella (1976)
- La vida cambia (1976) - Don Bernardo
- Pantaleón y las visitadoras (1976) - El Sinchi
- Length of War (1976) - Gral. Felipe Cruz
- Acto de posesión (1977) - Pedro
- Las ficheras: Bellas de noche II parte (1977) - Psicologo
- La coquito (1977)
- Una noche embarazosa (1977) - Doctor Perales
- Duro pero seguro (1978) - Doctor Luis Frey
- La plaza de Puerto Santo (1978) - Don Gonzalo
- El jardín de los cerezos (1978) - Don Placido
- Las noches de Paloma (1978) - Don Ángel Monroy
- Rocky Carambola (1979) - Don Damián
- Matar por matar (1979)
- El rediezcubrimiento de México (1979) - Don Melitón Samaniego Teocaltiche
- La capilla ardiente (1981)
- La muerte es un buen negocio (1981) - (final film role)
