= Mauricio Kleiff =

Mexican screenwriter (1931–2010)

- Born: 14 March 1931
- Died: 23 March 2010 (aged 79)
- Occupation: Screenwriter

Mauricio Kleyff (14 March 1931 – 23 March 2010) was a Mexican screenwriter best known for writing the scripts of the television programs El show de los Polivoces and Los Beverly de Peralvillo.
