= Two Mules for Sister Sara =

1970 film by Don Siegel

- US film poster
- Directed by: Don Siegel
- Screenplay by: Albert Maltz
- Story by: Budd Boetticher
- Produced by: Martin Rackin; Carroll Case
- Starring: Shirley MacLaine; Clint Eastwood
- Cinematography: Gabriel Figueroa
- Edited by: Robert F. Shugrue; Juan José Marino
- Music by: Ennio Morricone
- Production companies: The Malpaso Company; Sanen Productions
- Distributed by: Universal Pictures
- Release dates: May 28, 1970 (Dallas); August 13, 1970 (Mexico)
- Running time: 114 minutes
- Country: United States; Mexico
- Language: English
- Budget: $2.5 million
- Box office: $4.8 million (rentals)

Two Mules for Sister Sara is a 1970 Western film directed by Don Siegel and starring Shirley MacLaine and Clint Eastwood. Set during the second French intervention in Mexico (1861–67), the plot follows an American mercenary who gets mixed up with a nun and aids a group of Juarista rebels during the puppet reign of Emperor Maximilian in Mexico.

The film was to have been the first in a five-year exclusive association between Universal Pictures and Sanen Productions of Mexico. The film featured both American and Mexican actors and actresses, including being filmed in the picturesque countryside near Tlayacapan, Morelos. Two Mules for Sister Sara was the second of five collaborations between Siegel and Eastwood, following Coogan's Bluff (1968).

Released in the United States by Universal Pictures on May 28, 1970, Two Mules for Sister Sara was a moderate financial success and received a warm critical reception.

== Plot ==
Just after the American Civil War, a former Union soldier named Hogan rides up on a naked woman about to be raped by bandits. He kills the bandits, and the woman dons a habit, revealing herself as a nun. Sister Sara begs his continuing protection from French soldiers who are tracking her as a known Juarista, raising money to assist Mexican revolutionaries fighting French occupying forces. When Sara requests that Hogan take her to the Mexican camp, he is at first hesitant to deviate from his plans, declaring that if she were not a nun, he would let her fend for herself. Learning that she has knowledge of the French garrison where she has ostensibly taught Spanish to the French soldiers, Hogan agrees to escort her there, as he had previously arranged to help the revolutionaries attack the French garrison in exchange for half the garrison's treasury.

As the duo heads towards the camp, evading French troops all the while, Hogan is surprised that the nun swears and drinks whiskey. While on their way to destroy a French ammunition train, Hogan is shot at by Yaquis and seriously wounded with an arrow. To anesthetize him while removing the arrow from his shoulder, Sara plies Hogan with whiskey, making him drunk in the process. Due to his injured shoulder, Hogan cannot climb the trestle. When Sara declares she cannot climb the high trestle herself to set the charges, Hogan reminds her of her debt to him in saving her life, and she reluctantly complies, enabling them to successfully blow up the train. In his drunken stupor, Hogan bitterly reveals to Sara that he is attracted to her and resents her being a nun.

Eventually, the two reach Juarista commander Col. Beltran's camp. In the lead-up to the attack, Sara begs the local villagers for money needed to purchase dynamite for the assault on the garrison, enlisting the help of prostitutes at a brothel. When Hogan is shocked that she would take them to a brothel, Sara reveals to Hogan that she is not a nun, but a prostitute and a Juarista wanted for shooting a French lieutenant. She posed as a nun initially for protection as a woman travelling alone and later because of Hogan's initial stated reluctance to protect her had she not been a nun. Although Hogan is shocked, resenting all the chaste nights they spent together travelling, he kisses her and declares it is a bad time to indulge. The two team up to infiltrate the fort and let a squad of revolutionaries in through a trapdoor, while two other squads attack the gates and a fourth acts as sharpshooters.

Expecting the French army to be drunk for Bastille Day, they instead find that the train's destruction has put the garrison on high alert. Hogan and Sara infiltrate the fortress by Hogan posing as a bounty hunter who has captured Sara and is turning her in for the reward. The ruse works, and Hogan and Sara engage the French commanding officers while the garrison's gates are breached for the Mexican revolutionaries to swarm through. A battle ensues, the French are defeated, and the Mexicans capture the fort. As promised, Hogan receives half the riches. Now wealthy and with his job completed, Hogan sets off with Sara, now wearing a garish red silk gown and feathers instead of the habit; the romantic couple now intend to open a gambling house in San Francisco.

== Cast ==
- Shirley MacLaine as Sara
- Clint Eastwood as Hogan
- Manolo Fábregas as Col. Beltrán
- Alberto Morin as Gen. LeClaire
- David Estuardo as Juan
- Ada Carrasco as Juan's mother
- Pancho Córdova as Juan's father
- José Chávez as Horacio
- Hortensia Santoveña as Consuelo
- Rosa Furman as Imelda
- José Ángel Espinosa as French Officer
- Aurora Muñoz as Sara's Friend
- Armando Silvestre, John Kelly, and Enrique Lucero as the American bandits

== Production ==
=== Development ===
Budd Boetticher, a long-term resident of Mexico renowned for his series of Randolph Scott Westerns, wrote the original 1967 screenplay that was bought with the provision that he would direct. Boetticher had planned the film for Robert Mitchum and Deborah Kerr, who had played a man of action and a nun in Heaven Knows, Mr. Allison. Kerr's character was a member of the Mexican aristocracy escaping the vengeance of the Mexican Revolution, with Mitchum's cowboy protecting her as he led her to safety in the United States.

Carrol Case sold the screenplay to Martin Rackin, who had Albert Maltz, also living in Mexico, rewrite the story. Maltz's version was set during the French intervention in Mexico, and had Clint Eastwood playing a soldier of fortune for the Juaristas, and Shirley MacLaine portraying a revolutionary prostitute. In the film, Eastwood embodied the tall, mysterious stranger, unshaven, wearing a serape-like vest and smoking a cigar. Although the film had Leonesque dirty Hispanic villains, it was considerably less crude and more sardonic than those of Leone. The film score was composed by Ennio Morricone.

Boetticher expressed disgust that MacLaine's bawdy character obviously did not resemble a nun, as opposed to his idea of a genteel lady whose final revelation would have been more of a surprise to the audience. Though Boetticher was friends with both Eastwood and director Don Siegel, Siegel understood Boetticher's dislike of the final film. When Boetticher asked Siegel how he could make an awful film like that, Siegel replied that it was a great feeling to wake up in the morning and know a check was in the mail; Boetticher riposted that it was a better feeling to wake up in the morning and be able to look at oneself in the mirror.

=== Casting ===
Eastwood had been shown the script by Elizabeth Taylor (at the time, the wife of Richard Burton) during the filming of Where Eagles Dare; she hoped to play the role of Sister Sara. It was initially offered to her, but she had to turn down the role because she wanted to shoot in Spain, where Burton was making his latest film. Sister Sara was supposed to be Mexican, but Shirley MacLaine was cast, instead. Although they were initially unconvinced with her pale complexion, Eastwood believed that the studio was keen on MacLaine, as they had high hopes for her film Sweet Charity, in which she played a taxi dancer. Both Siegel and Eastwood felt she was unfriendly on set, and Siegel described MacLaine thusly: "It's hard to feel any great warmth to her. She's too unfeminine and has too much balls. She's very, very hard." Two Mules for Sister Sara marked the last time that Eastwood would receive second billing for a film.

=== Filming ===
Don Siegel describes his struggle to exert control over the filming of Two Mules for Sister Sara: “Marty Rackin [the producer] and I didn’t get along. I’d make my points, but he would walk away saying ‘I lose the battles, but I win the war.’” According to Siegel, the war Rackin won was that “he, not I, did the final editing. It’s a limited victory, because if you cut the picture in the camera, shoot the minimum [footage]...there isn’t much leeway in editing unless the producer orders more film shots.”

The film was shot over 65 days in Mexico and cost around $4 million. Exteriors were filmed mostly on-location near Tlayacapan, Morelos, while interiors were shot at Estudios Churubusco in Mexico City. Many of the cast and crew, including MacLaine, were stricken by illness while filming, due to having to adjust to the food and water in Mexico.

Bruce Surtees, a camera operator on the film, acted as a go-between for Siegel and cinematographer Gabriel Figueroa; this led to his working on Siegel's next film The Beguiled. Figueroa used many photographic filters for effects in the film.

Eastwood revealed that he actually killed a rattlesnake for a scene in the film, as Mexican authorities did not want it released in the area after filming was over. Eastwood noted that he did not want to kill it, as he is opposed to killing animals.

== Release ==
The film opened May 28, 1970 in Dallas, Texas. It also opened in Denver the same week.

== Reception ==
=== Box office ===
In its opening week in Denver, it grossed $35,000 from two theaters. The film returned $4.8 million in theatrical rentals in the United States and Canada, rendering it a solid, modestly profitable hit (a movie's gross is often close to twice the domestic rentals figure).

=== Critical response ===
Two Mules for Sister Sara received moderately favorable reviews, and Roger Greenspun of The New York Times reported: "I'm not sure it is a great movie, but it is very good, and it stays and grows on the mind the way only movies of exceptional narrative intelligence do". Stanley Kauffmann of The New Republic described the film as "an attempt to keep old Hollywood alive—a place where nuns can turn out to be disguised whores, where heroes can always have a stick of dynamite under their vests, where every story has not one but two cute finishes. Its kind of The African Queen gone west". In a review by the Los Angeles Herald-Examiner, Two Mules for Sister Sara was called "a solidly entertaining film that provides Clint Eastwood with his best, most substantial role to date; in it he is far better than he has ever been. In director Don Siegel, Eastwood has found what John Wayne found in John Ford and what Gary Cooper found in Frank Capra."

Biographer Judith M. Kass concurs: "In Eastwood’s manner, Siegel found the filmic mirror of himself, and the mythic antihero of the soiled American dream...”

Stanley Kauffmann of The New Republic wrote: 'It doesn't matter to Siegel that the characters are cliches, the acting is atrocious, the plot laughable, the dialogue dumb, and the patriotic theme only a peg to hang killings on. Siegel shoots and edits his film well, and that is supposed to be enough.'

The New York Times included Two Mules for Sister Sara in its book, The New York Times Guide to the Best 1,000 Movies Ever Made. Author Howard Hughes joked that critics "couldn't argue that Eastwood's acting was second to nun."

On Rotten Tomatoes, it has a score of 71% with a mean of 6.8 of a possible10 based on 17 reviews.

== Accolades ==
Award	Year	Category	Nominee	Result
Laurel Award	1971	Best Action Performance	Clint Eastwood	3rd place
Laurel Award	1971	Best Comedy Performance, Female	Shirley MacLaine	5th place

== See also ==
- List of American films of 1970

== Bibliography ==
- Canby, Vincent; Maslin, Janet; Nichols, Peter (1999). The New York Times Guide to the Best 1000 Movies Ever Made. New York: Times Books. ISBN 0-8129-3001-0.
- Eliot, Marc (2009). American Rebel: The Life of Clint Eastwood. Harmony Books. ISBN 978-0-307-33688-0.
- Frayling, Christopher (1992). Clint Eastwood. London: Virgin. ISBN 0-86369-307-5.
- Hughes, Howard (2009). Aim for the Heart. London: I.B. Tauris. ISBN 978-1-84511-902-7.
- Kass, Judith M. (1975). Don Seigel: The Hollywood Professionals, Volume 4 (1975 ed.). New York: Tanvity Press. p. 207. ISBN 0-498-01665-X.
- McGilligan, Patrick (1999). Clint: The Life and Legend. London: HarperCollins. ISBN 0-00-638354-8.
- Munn, Michael (1992). Clint Eastwood: Hollywood's Loner. London: Robson Books. ISBN 0-86051-790-X.
- Schickel, Richard (1996). Clint Eastwood: A Biography. New York: Knopf. ISBN 978-0-679-42974-6.
- Smith, Paul (1993). Clint Eastwood: A Cultural Production: Volume 8 of American Culture. Minneapolis: University of Minnesota Press. ISBN 0-8166-1960-3.
