= Julián de Meriche =

Russian-born Mexican actor, choreographer, dancers, and director (1909–1974)

- Born: Vladimir Lipkies Chazan; October 10, 1910; Russian Empire
- Died: July 27, 1974 (aged 63); México, D.F., México
- Resting place: Pantheon Garden, México, D.F., Mexico
- Occupations: Actor, choreographer, dancers, and director
- Spouse: María Elena Velasco (m. 1965)
- Children: Ivan Lipkies; Ivette Lipkies; Goretti Lipkies

Julián de Meriche (born Vladimir Lipkies Chazan; October 10, 1910 – July 27, 1974) was a Russian–born Mexican actor, choreographer, dancer, and director. He was known for his villainous roles and raspy voice.

== Career ==
De Meriche worked as a dancer in European music halls, then moved to Argentina where he worked in the cinema in the 1930s.

He moved to Mexico and participated by portraying supporting roles in many films from the 1940s until his death, often playing foreigners. De Meriche also worked as an actor and director on many stages, in television, and in cabaret performances.

== Personal life ==
De Meriche was married to María Elena Velasco "La India María". Their children are producer-director Iván Lipkies, writer-actress Ivette “Goretti” Lipkies

== Sources ==
- Wilt, David E. (October 1997). The Mexican Film Bulletin. 4 (3).
