= Fernando Cortés =

Puerto Rican film actor, writer and director (1909–1979)

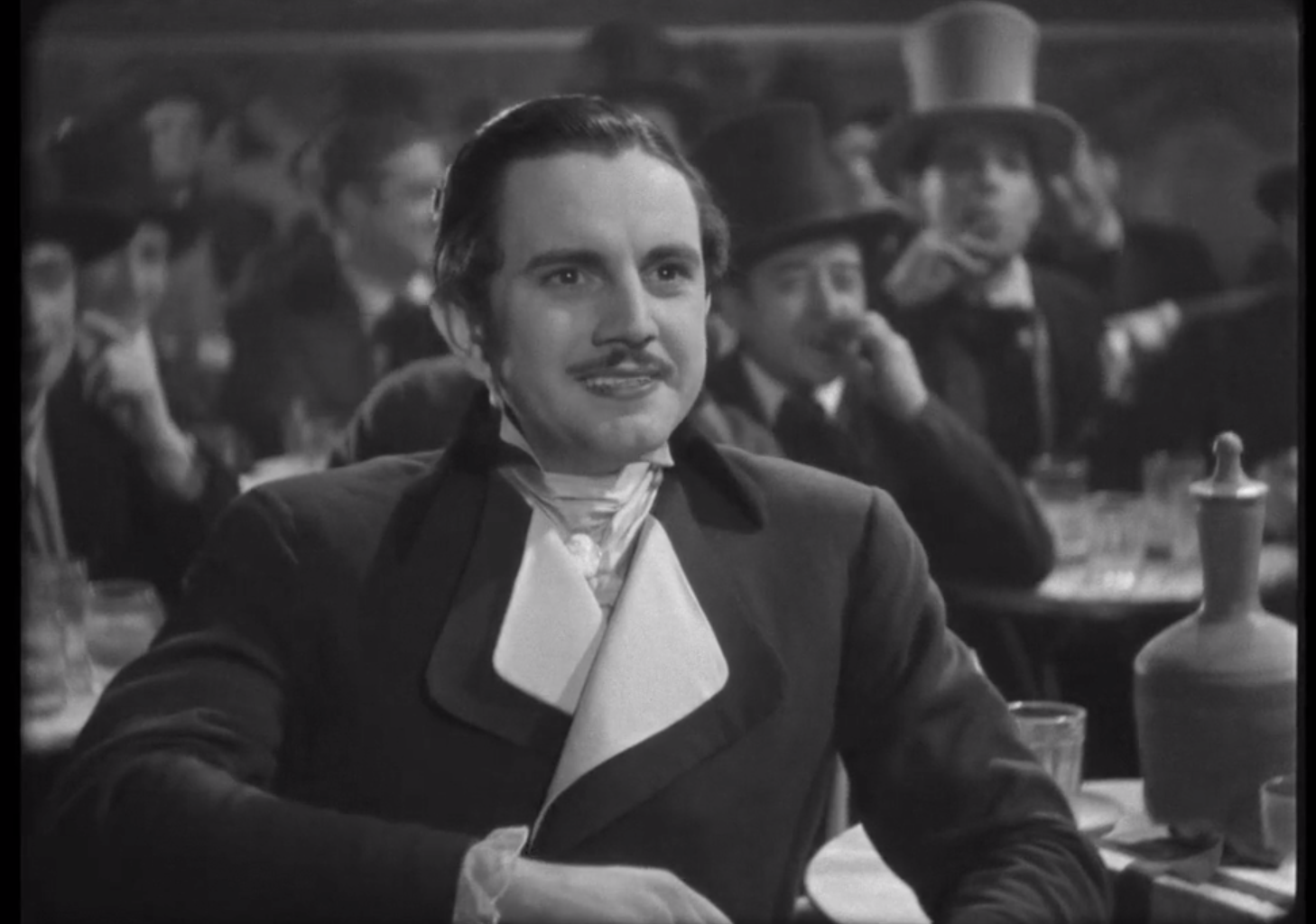
- Cortes in Doña Francisquita (1934)
- Born: Fernando Cortés Rodríguez; October 4, 1909; San Juan, Puerto Rico
- Died: April 28, 1979 (aged 69); Mexico City, Mexico
- Occupation: Actor
- Years active: 1923-1970s
- Spouse: Mapy Cortés

Fernando "Papi" Cortés Rodríguez (October 4, 1909 – 1979) was a Puerto Rican film actor, writer and director. During his career he was involved in all aspects of film production in Latin America and Spain.

== Early life ==
He was born on October 4, 1909 in San Juan, Puerto Rico to Francisco J. Cortés González and Rosa Rodríguez Todd, both from San Juan. In 1932, while in New York City, Fernando Cortés married Puerto Rican childhood friend María del Pilar Cordero Berrios, who adopted the stage name of Mapy Cortés. In 1921, Cortés made his debut in the silent film La historia de un torero. He then appeared in 1934's feature film Doña Francisquita. The couple soon traveled to Spain with a Cuban theatrical troupe. They worked on the Spanish stage, radio and film until the outbreak of the Civil War in 1936. Fernando progressively began to take a backseat as actor and baritone and focused on promoting the career of his wife Mapy, who became a noted vedette (showgirl with star status) in Barcelona.

After the Spanish Civil War interrupted their careers, the couple worked in New York, San Juan, Buenos Aires, Havana and Caracas, occasionally starring in movies. They arrived to Mexico City in late 1940 and made their stage debut at the Teatro Follies, in a show headlined by the popular Mexican comedian Cantinflas. Despite early struggles to become household names, Mapy achieved Mexican film stardom in late 1941 and the couple settled in Mexico City. Initially, Fernando Cortés played supporting roles in his wife's films. They went on to appear in La liga de las canciones (1941), Internado para señoritas (1943), La corte del faraón (1944), Un beso en la noche, El Conde de Montecristo (1942) and Recien casados... No molestar (1951), among others. Individually, Cortés was involved as a director in several projects at Mexico. He then made a successful debut as director with La pícara Susana (1945), a comedy vehicle for his wife.

In March 1954, Fernando and Mapy Cortés returned to Puerto Rico to help launch local television. Cortés became the first director at WKAQ-TV, Channel 2, and the couple co-starred in Mapy y Papi, the first Puerto Rican sitcom. Despite their success on local TV, the couple returned the following year to Mexico City, which offered more opportunities. The couple starred in a Mexican version of their Puerto Rican sitcom and Mapy returned to the stage. Fernando Cortés became known as a reliable director of Mexican comedies on stage, television and film. After writing and directing star vehicles for his wife Mapy in the 1940s and comedians like Resortes and Tin-Tan in the 1950s.

During the 1960s, Cortés also produced Dormitorio para señoritas (1960), Rateros último modelo and Las Tres Calaveras. These films would feature other members of his family including niece Mapita and he also served as director. During the era of Mexican-Puerto Rican co-productions, the couple produced Los Expatriados (1964), Los Tres Pecados (1966), Luna de miel en Puerto Rico (1969), Pobre, pero honrada! (1973) and Pasajeros en tránsito (1978). During the 1970s, Cortés also directed the Mexican series La criada bien criada and the films Las Golfas, Los Beverly Hills de Peralvillo (1971), La Criada Maravilla, El hijo de Angela María (1974) and Futbolista fenómeno (1979). These launched the film career of La India María.

During the 1970s, the couple withdrew from the public eye and spent less time in the media. Cortés died on October 4, 1979. As part of his work, he wrote nearly 50 scripts and was involved in at least 84 films.

== Filmography ==
=== As actor ===
- Doña Francisquita (Hans Behrendt, 1934)
- Usted tiene ojos de mujer fatal (Juan Parellada, 1936)
- El amor gitano (Alfonso de Benavides, 1936)
- La última melodía (Jaime Salvador, 1939)
- The League of Songs (Chano Urueta, 1941)
- The Five Nights of Adam (Gilberto Martínez Solares, 1942)
- I Danced with Don Porfirio (Gilberto Martínez Solares, 1942)
- Internado para señoritas (Gilberto Martínez Solares, 1943)
- El globo de Cantolla (Gilberto Martínez Solares, 1943)
- The War of the Pastries (Emilio Gómez Muriel, 1944)
- La corte de Faraón (Julio Bracho, 1944)
- The Daughter of the Regiment (Jaime Salvador, 1944)
- He Who Died of Love (Miguel Morayta, 1945)
- Mischievous Susana (Fernando Cortés,1945)
- Love Makes Them Crazy (Fernando Cortés, 1946)
- El colmillo de Buda (Juan Bustillo Oro, 1949)
- Las tandas del Principal (Juan Bustillo Oro, 1949)
- Recién casados... no molestar (Fernando Cortés, 1950)
- Tres citas con el destino (F. Rey, F. Fuentes & L. Klimovsky, 1954)

=== As writer/director ===
- Mischievous Susana (1945)
- Las casadas engañan de 4 a 6 (1945)
- Love Makes Them Crazy (1946)
- Los maridos engañan de 7 a 9 (1946)
- Don't Marry My Wife (1947)
- Te besaré en la boca (1949)
- El charro y la dama (1949)
- El pecado de quererte (1949)
- Recién casados... no molestar (1950)
- La liga de las muchachas (1950)
- Amanecer a la vida (1950)
- El beisbolista fenómeno (1951)
- Hay un niño en su futuro (1951)
- Venezuela también canta / Olimpiadas musicales (1951)
- El luchador fenómeno (1952)
- Ni pobres ni ricos (1952)
- The Loving Women (1953)
- My Three Merry Widows (1953)
- Miradas que matan (1953)
- Viva la juventud (1955)
- El campeón ciclista (1956)
- Cómicos de la legua (1956)
- Refifí entre las mujeres (1956)
- El teatro del crimen (1956)
- Pobres millonarios (1957)
- Puss Without Boots (1957)
- Locos peligrosos (1957)
- La odalisca No. 13 (1957)
- Viaje a la luna (1957)
- A sablazo limpio (1958)
- A Thousand and One Nights (1958)
- Échame a mí la culpa (1958)
- Tres lecciones de amor (1958)
- Three Black Angels (1960)
- Comedians and Songs (1960)
- El aviador fenómeno (1960)
- Dios sabrá juzgarnos (1960)
- La marca del muerto (1960)
- Vacaciones en Acapulco (1960)
- Un día de diciembre (1961)
- Jóvenes y bellas (1961)
- Quiero morir en carnaval (1961)
- Los tres pecados (1965)
- Luna de miel en condominio (1966)
- Un latin lover en Acapulco (1967)
- Me casé con un cura (1967)
- Las vírgenes de la nueva ola (1969)
- Las golfas (1969)
- La casa de las muchachas (1969)
- Los Beverly de Peralvillo (1971)
- Tonta, tonta, pero no tanto (1972)
- La criada bien criada (1972)
- Pobre, pero...¡honrada! (1973)
- Que familia tan cotorra! (1973)
- Algo es algo dijo el diablo (1974)
- La presidenta municipal (1975)
- El miedo no anda en burro (1976)
- La comadrita (1978)
- Criada maravilla (1978)
