= Amparo Arozamena =

Mexican actress (1916–2009)

- Born: María Amparo Arozamena Sánchez; August 24, 1916; Mexico City
- Died: April 30, 2009 (aged 92); Mexico City
- Other name: Amparito Arozamena
- Occupation: Actress
- Years active: 1929–2004
- Spouses: Roberto G. Serna (died) Ramón Barón (m. 1952)
- Children: 1 Juan Antonio Serna Arozamena

Amparo Arozamena (August 24, 1916 – April 30, 2009) was a Mexican actress of film and television, best known for her character roles in the 1960s. During the same decade, she became most noted for her role of "Doña Chole" in the Telesistema Mexicano sitcom Los Beverly de Peralvillo (1968–1973). Arozamena had been acting since her early teens and had her first feature film released at the age of thirteen.

== Biography ==
Arozamena was born on August 24, 1916, in Mexico City, Mexico. She was the youngest daughter from Eduardo "Nanche" Arozamena (a popular character actor from the variety stage) and his first wife, treble of theatre Clemencia Sánchez Méndez. Many of the family's members had artistic background and successful performing careers. Although Amparo began her career during her early teens in the silent era, she wasn't well known until she played character roles in comedy films during the 1960s, theater plays and TV shows in the 1970s.

== Death ==
She died on April 30, 2009, aged 92, from a heart attack and old age. After losing her second husband, she lived with her niece, the soap-opera writer and playwright Marisa Garrido Arozamena. At the time of her death, Amparo Arozamena was one of the few surviving silent film actors, having appeared in the 1929 silent movie, La calle del ensueño.

== Filmography ==
- María Elena (1936)
- La calle del ensueño (1929)
- Almas encontradas (1933)
- El rayo de Sinaloa (1935)
- Perfidia (1939) - Muriel, la cazafortunas
- La justicia de Pancho Villa (1940)
- The Unknown Policeman (1941)
- Hasta que llovió en Sayula (1941)
- ¡Qué verde era mi padre! (1945)
- Toda una vida (1945)
- Canas al aire (1949)
- La hija del penal (1949)
- The Magician (1949)
- La vorágine (1949)
- Cuando los padres se quedan solos (1949) - Lorenza
- It's a Sin to Be Poor (1950)
- Traces of the Past (1950)
- To the Sound of the Mambo (1950) - María La O
- Cabaret Shanghai (1950)
- La dama torera (1950) - Julia
- We Maids (1951)
- My Wife Is Not Mine (1951)
- Baile mi rey (1951)
- Madre querida (1951)
- Ahí vienen los gorrones (1953)
- Quiéreme porque me muero (1953)
- Forbidden Fruit (1953)
- La sexta carrera (1953)
- Cantando nace el amor (1954)
- Se solicitan modelos (1954)
- A Tailored Gentleman (1954)
- Maldita ciudad (1954)
- Tres bribones (1955)
- El caso de la mujer asesinadita (1955)
- Cielito lindo (1957)
- Pobres millonarios (1957)
- El organillero (1957)
- Sabrás que te quiero (1958)
- Maratón de baile (1958)
- Quiero ser artista (1958)
- Cuatro copas (1958)
- Tres desgraciados con suerte (1958)
- Mi desconocida esposa (1958)
- Nacida para amar (1959)
- El Sordo (1959)
- México nunca duerme (1959)
- La vida de Agustín Lara (1959) - Criada
- Las Leandras (1960) - Manuela Monterubio
- El dolor de pagar la renta (1960)
- Dos hijos disobedientes (1960)
- Sobre el muerto las coronas (1961)
- Viva Chihuahua (1961)
- ¡Que padre tan padre! (1961)
- Destino (1962) Telenovela
- Las Amapolo (1962)
- Cri Cri el grillito cantor (1963)
- El amor llegó a Jalisco (1963)
- México de mis recuerdos (1963) - Sra. de teatro
- La divina garza (1963)
- Los parranderos (1963)
- Ruletero a toda marcha (1964)
- Dos innocentes mujeriegos (1964)
- La vida de Pedro Infante (1966) - Pasajera en autobús
- Duelo de pasiones (1968) Telenovela - Chuy
- Mi padrino (1968)
- Los Beverly de Peralvillo (Serie TV) (1968-1971) - Doña Chole
- Los Beverly del Peralvillo (1971) - Doña Chole
- La cigueña sí es un bicho (1971)
- Que familia tan cotorra (1971)
- Chucherías (1972-1974) - Varios personajes
- Las hijas de don Laureano (1974)
- Ven conmigo (1975) - Eulogia
- Yo y mi mariachi (1975)
- El Apenitas (1978)
- El patrullero 777 (1978)
- Nora la rebelde (1979) - Beatriz vda. de Pérez
- Cuentos colorados (1980)
- Angélica (1982) Telenovela
- En busca del paraíso (1982) Telenovela - Hortensia
- Por amor (1982) Telenovela
- Allá en el rancho de las floresx (1983)
- Mas valiente del mundo (1983)
- El mexicano feo (1984)
- Hospital De La Risa (1986) - Milagros
- Ser charro es ser mexicano (1987)
- Un paso al más acá (1988)
- Quisiera ser hombre (1988) - Chona
- Cuando llega el amor (1989-1990) Telenovela - Doña Refugio vda. de Carrillo
- Baila conmigo (1992) Telenovela - Consuelo
- Pólvora en la piel (1992)
- Dos hermanos buena onda (1993)
- Yo hice a Roque III (1993)
- Buscando el paraíso (1994) Telenovela - Doña Edna
- 3 comunes y corrientes (1995)
- Alondra (1995) Telenovela - Matilde "Maty" Ruiz
- Pobre Niña Rica (1995) Telenovela - Doña Andrea Múzquiz
- Hasta que los cuernos nos separen (1995)
- Los Nuevos Beverly (1996)
- El diario de Daniela (1998) Telenovela - Amparito
- Humor es... los comediantes (1999) - Invitada
- Cuento de Navidad (1999) Mini-telenovela - Clienta de Melquíades
- DKDA: Sueños de juventud (1999) Telenovela - Carmelita
- Locura de amor (2000/I) Telenovela - Doña Tomasa
- Mi Destino Eres Tú (2000) Telenovela - Chonita
- Amigos X Siempre (2000) Telenovela - Doña Virginia
