= Guillermo Rivas (actor) =

Mexican actor

Guillermo Rivas Rowlatt (December 25, 1926 – March 19, 2004) was a Mexican character actor known for portraying "El Borras" in the Telesistema Mexicano sitcom Los Beverly de Peralvillo (1968–1973).

== Early life ==
Rivas was born in Mexico City, Mexico, his father was Antonio Ribas Murphy (1901–1945) a Catalan, his mother was Maria Luisa Rowlatt Romana (1910–1983) British descendant.

== Career ==
His first role in a film was in 1938, aged only eleven years old, The Cemetery of the Eagles starring Jorge Negrete. In 1947, he lived in New York City where his love for performing arts was born. While sharing stages with Mario Moreno 'Cantinflas', Silvia Pinal and Enrique Rambal, he made more over 100 television and movie appearances. He received his nickname "El Borras" after starring in the TV series Los Beverly de Peralvillo, which also inspired two movies. Rivas appeared in films of the 1960s, 1970s, and 1980s, generally comedies, but he was also capable of playing dramatic roles.

His highlights include the TV series Gutierritos, ¡Vivan los niños!, Carita de Angel, and La mentira, and the movies Cucurrucucú Paloma, Qué familia tan cotorra and Los Hermanos Diablo.

== Personal life and death ==
He was married for 49 years to Guadalupe Andrade Torres, with whom he shared acting roles since his early theatre and TV career, and had three children, Ricardo Enrique (born 1957), Guillermo Edwin "Gary Rivas" (born 1961) and Monica Elena (born 1965).

He died of complications from hepatitis and pneumonia in Mexico City at the age of 77.

== Selected filmography ==
- The White Renegade (1960)
- Love in the Shadows (1960)
- The Extra (1962)
- Immediate Delivery (1963)
