= List of Mexican films of the 1980s =

A list of the films produced in the cinema of Mexico in the 1980s, ordered by year of release. For an alphabetical list of articles on Mexican films, see Category:Mexican films.

== 1980 ==
Title	Director	Cast	Genre	Notes
1980
A fuego lento	Juan Ibáñez	María Victoria, Óscar Chávez, Gilberto Pérez Gallardo, María Luisa Landín, María Safont	Musical	
Amigo	Tito Davison	Pedrito Fernández, Andrés García		Co-production with Spain
La noche del Ku-Klux-Klan	Rubén Galindo	Pedro Infante Jr., Noé Murayama		
Por única vez			Short	
El secreto	Luis Mandoki			
Burlesque	René Cardona	Alma Muriel, Lyn May		
Picardia Méxicana 2	Rafael Villaseñor Kuri	Vicente Fernández, Héctor Suárez, Lalo "El Mimo"		
El sexologo	Luis María Delgado	Andrés García, Amparo Muñoz, Angélica Chain, Blanca Guerra, Helga Liné, Humberto Elizondo		
Perro callejero	Gilberto Gazcón	Valentín Trujillo, Ana Luisa Peluffo, Eric del Castillo, Lyn May, Sergio Goyri		
El ladrón fenómeno	Rubén Galindo	Adalberto Martínez "Resortes", María Rebeca, Cornelio Reyna, Pedro Infante Jr., Tere Álvarez, Mario Cid, Alfredo Wally Barrón		
A paso de cojo	Luis Alcoriza			
Como México no hay dos	Rafael Villaseñor Kuri	Vicente Fernández, Blanca Guerra, Héctor Suárez, Maribel Guardia, Roberto "Flaco" Guzmán		
Coyote and Bronca	Rafael Villaseñor Kuri	Vicente Fernández, Blanca Guerra, Felipe Arriaga, Gloria Marín		
Del otro lado del puente	Gonzalo Martínez Ortega	Juan Gabriel, Valentin Trujillo, Lucha Villa, Julio Alemán		
El charro del misterio	José Juan Munguía	José Martín, Alicia Juárez, Julio Aldama, Alfredo Gutiérrez, Beatriz Adriana, Alfonso Munguía		
El sátiro	Raúl Zenteno	Mauricio Garcés, Patricia Rivera, Alberto Rojas		
Frontera	Fernando Durán Rojas	Fernando Allende, Daniela Romo, Guillermo Capetillo		
Las tres tumbas	Alberto Mariscal	Federico Villa, Norma Lazareno, Narciso Busquets		
Misterio	Marcela Fernández Violante	Juan Ferrara, Helena Rojo, Víctor Junco, Beatríz Sheridan		
Navajeros	Eloy de la Iglesia	José Luis Manzano, Isela Vega, Jaime Garza		Co-production with Spain
Novia, esposa y amante	Tulio Demicheli	Pedro Armendáriz Jr., Raúl Ramírez, Daniela Romo		
Sexo vs. sexo	Víctor Manuel Castro	Sara García		

== 1981 ==
Title	Director	Cast	Genre	Notes	Ref.
El lobo negro					
Duelo a muerte					
Las siete cucas	Felipe Cazals	Isela Vega, David Reynoso			
La seducción	Arturo Ripstein	Katy Jurado, Viridiana Alatriste		Entered into the 12th Moscow International Film Festival	
Rastro de muerte	Arturo Ripstein	Pedro Armendáriz Jr., Rosa Carmina			
Perro callejero II	Gilberto Gazcón	Valentín Trujillo, Blanca Guerra, Ana Luisa Peluffo, Patricia Rivera, Sergio Goyri, Eric del Castillo, Narciso Busquets			
La niña de la mochila azul 2	Rubén Galindo	Pedrito Fernández, Adalberto Martínez "Resortes", María Rebeca, Monica Prado, Mario Cid			
Chanoc y el hijo del Santo contra los vampiros asesinos	Rafael Perez Grovas	El Santo, Hijo del Santo, Nelson Velasquez (Chanoc), Arturo Cobo (Tzekub)	Luchador		
Car Crash	Antonio Margheriti	Joey Travolta, Vittorio Mezzogiorno, Ana Obregón		Co-production with Italy and Spain	
Caveman	Carl Gottlieb	Ringo Starr, Dennis Quaid, Shelley Long, Barbara Bach		Co-production with the United States	
Demonoid	Alfredo Zacarías	Samantha Eggar, Stuart Whitman, Roy Jenson, Lew Saunders, Narciso Busquets, José Chávez			
High Risk	Stewart Raffill	James Brolin, Lindsay Wagner, Cleavon Little, James Coburn, Ernest Borgnine, Anthony Quinn		Co-production with the United States and the United Kingdom	
La Chèvre	Francis Veber	Pierre Richard, Gérard Depardieu		Co-production with France	
La Pachanga	José Estrada	Julissa, Claudia Islas, Gregorio Casal, Alejandro Ciangherotti, Sergio Jiménez, Carmelita González			
Mojado Power	Alfonso Arau	Alfonso Arau, Blanca Guerra, Pedro Damián		Submitted as the Mexican entry for the Best Foreign Language Film at the 54th Academy Awards	
Semana santa en Acapulco	Luis Alcoriza				
The Pulque Tavern	Víctor Manuel Castro	Jorge Rivero, Sasha Montenegro, Carmen Salinas			

== 1982 ==
Title	Director	Cast	Genre	Notes
El barrendero	Miguel M. Delgado	Cantinflas, María Sorté		Last film of Cantinflas
¡El que no corre... vuela!	Gilberto Martínez Solares	La India María, Evita Muñoz "Chachita", Irma Lozano, Freddy Fernández		
El sargento Capulina	Alfredo Zacarías	Capulina, Silvia Pasquel, Carmelina Encinas		
La isla de Rarotonga	Alfredo B. Crevenna	Raúl Ramírez, Marcela Daviland		
El padre trampitas	Pedro Galindo III	Resortes, Sergio Goyri, Pompín Iglesias, Víctor Alcocer, Patricia Rivera, Lorena Velázquez		
Amityville II: The Possession	Damiano Damiani	James Olson, Burt Young, Rutanya Alda, Jack Magner, Diane Franklin		Co-production with the United States
Antonieta	Carlos Saura	Isabelle Adjani, Hanna Schygulla		Co-production with Spain and France
Aquel famoso Remington	Gustavo Alatriste	Antonio Medellín		
El Chanfle 2	Roberto Gómez Bolaños	Roberto Gómez Bolaños, Florinda Meza, Rubén Aguirre, Edgar Vivar, María Antonieta de las Nieves, Angelines Fernández, Raúl 'Chato' Padilla		
Historia de una mujer escandalosa	Gustavo Alatriste			
La Víspera	Alejandro Pelayo	Ernesto Gómez Cruz, María Rojo, Alfredo Sevilla		Received four Ariel Awards in 1983
La combi asesina	Gustavo Alatriste			
Red Bells	Sergei Bondarchuk	Franco Nero, Ursula Andress		Co-production with the Soviet Union
Tac-tac	Luis Alcoriza			
The House of Bernarda Alba	Gustavo Alatriste			
Toña, nacida virgen (Del oficio)	Gustavo Alatriste			

== 1983 ==
Title	Director	Cast	Genre	Notes
El mil usos	Roberto G. Rivera	Héctor Suárez, Julieta Rossen		
Eréndira	Ruy Guerra			Entered into the 1983 Cannes Film Festival
Guerilla from the North	Francisco Guerrero			Entered into the 13th Moscow International Film Festival
Los renglones torcidos de Dios	Tulio Demicheli	Gonzalo Vega, Lucía Méndez		
México 2000	Rogelio A. González	Chucho Salinas, Héctor Lechuga		
Esta y l'otra con un solo boleto	Mario Cid	Rosa Carmina, Ariadne Welter		
El coyote emplumado	Alfredo B. Crevenna, María Elena Velasco	La India María, Miguel Ángel Rodríguez, Armando Soto La Marina, Noe Murayama		
Una pura y dos con sal	Rafael Villaseñor Kuri	Vicente Fernández, Blanca Guerra, Lalo el Mimo, Víctor Junco		
Las musiqueras	Federico Curiel	Evita Muñoz "Chachita", Norma Lazareno, Silvia Manríquez, Roberto Jordán, Los Bukis, Los Solitarios		
Todo un hombre	Rafael Villaseñor Kuri	Vicente Fernández, Eduardo Noriega, Felipe Arriaga, Amparo Muñoz		
Amityville 3-D	Richard Fleischer	Tony Roberts, Tess Harper, Robert Joy, Candy Clark, Lori Loughlin, Meg Ryan		Co-production with the United States
Appearances Are Deceptive	Jaime Humberto Hermosillo	Isela Vega, Gonzalo Vega, Manuel Ojeda		
Bajo la metralla	Felipe Cazals	Humberto Zurita, María Rojo, José Carlos Ruiz, Manuel Ojeda		Received four Ariel Awards in 1984
Con el cuerpo prestado	Tulio Demicheli	Sasha Montenegro, María Sorté		
Coqueta	Sergio Vejar	Lucero		
El amor es un juego extraño	Luis Alcoriza			
Frida Still Life	Paul Leduc	Ofelia Medina, Juan José Gurrola		Selected as the Mexican entry for the Best Foreign Language Film at the 58th Academy Awards
Lola the Truck Driver	Raúl Fernández	Rosa Gloria Chagoyán, Rolando Fernández, Irma Serrano		
Red Bells II	Sergei Bondarchuk	Franco Nero, Sydne Rome		Co-production with the Soviet Union
Roy del espacio		Hector López Carmona, Rafael Ángel Gil, Ulises Pérez Aguirre	Animation	
Secuestro En Acapulco-Canta Chamo		Los Chamos, César Bono, Lucila Mariscal, Yuri, María Antonieta de las Nieves		Co-production with Venezuela
Spicy Chile	René Cardona Jr.	Andrés García, Angélica Chain, Alberto Rojas		

== 1984 ==
Title	Director	Cast	Genre	Notes
Under the Volcano	John Huston	Emilio Fernández, Katy Jurado		
Noche de carnaval	Mario Hernández	Ninón Sevilla, Carmen Salinas		
Pedro Navaja	Alfonso Rosas Priego	Andrés García, Maribel Guardia, Sasha Montenegro, Adalberto Martínez "Resortes", Sergio Goyri, Ana Luisa Peluffo		
Veneno para las hadas	Carlos Enrique Taboada	Ana Patricia Rojo, Rita Macedo, Leonor Llausás		
Delincuente	Sergio Véjar	Lucerito, Pedrito Fernández	Musical	
Mujeres salvajes	Gabriel Retes	Tina Romero		
Toy Soldiers	David Andrew Fisher	Jason Miller, Cleavon Little, Tim Robbins, Terri Garber		Co-production with the United States
Ya nunca más	Abel Salazar	Luis Miguel		

== 1985 ==
Title	Director	Cast	Genre	Notes
Los hijos del diablo	Julio Aldama	Eulalio González, David Reynoso, Julio Augurio	Western	
El embustero	Rafael Villaseñor Kuri	Vicente Fernández, Patricia Rivera, María Sorté, Miguel Ángel Rodríguez, Freddy Fernández, Pedro Weber "Chatanuga"		
Toña Machetes	Raúl Araíza	Sonia Infante, Ignacio López Tarso	Drama	Winner, Ariel Award for Best Supporting Actor (José Carlos Ruiz)
El ratero de la vecindad II	Gilberto Martínez Solares	Alfonso Zayas, Angélica Chain, Maribel Fernández	Comedy	
La Casa que arde de noche	René Cardona Jr.	Sonia Infante, Carmen Montejo, Lyn May	Drama	Based on the novel by Ricardo Garibay
Nana	Rafael Baledón	Irma Serrano, Isela Vega, Verónica Castro, Gregorio Casal	Drama	Based on the novel by Émile Zola
Mexican, You Can Do It	José Estrada	Héctor Suárez, Lina Santos	Comedy	Entered into the 14th Moscow International Film Festival
Cemetery of Terror	Rubén Galindo Jr	Hugo Stiglitz		
Dona Herlinda and Her Son	Jaime Humberto Hermosillo	Arturo Meza, Marco Treviño and Guadalupe del Toro		
Doña Lupe	Guillermo del Toro		Short	
Fiebre de amor	René Cardona Jr.	Lucero, Luis Miguel		
Gavilán o Paloma	Alfredo Gurrola	José José, Christian Bach, Jorge Ortiz de Pinedo		
Los Motivos de Luz	Felipe Cazals	Patricia Reyes Spíndola, Alonso Echánove, Ana Ofelia Murguía, Delia Casanova		Received two Ariel Awards in 1986
Terror and Black Lace	Luis Alcoriza			

== 1986 ==
Title	Director	Cast	Genre	Notes
El maleficio 2	Raúl Araiza	Ernesto Alonso, Lucía Méndez		
Las amantes del señor de la noche	Isela Vega	Isela Vega, Emilio Fernández, Irma Serrano		
El hijo de Pedro Navaja	Alfonso Rosas Priego	Guillermo Capetillo, Adalberto Martínez "Resortes", Sasha Montenegro, Rodolfo de Anda, Jorge Luke, Ana Luisa Peluffo, Gabriela Goldsmith		
Mentiras (film)	Abel Salazar, Alberto Mariscal	Lupita D'Alessio, Juan Ferrara, Jorge Ortiz de Pinedo		
Miracles	Jim Kouf	Teri Garr, Paul Rodriguez, Christopher Lloyd, Tom Conti		Co-production with the United States
The Kidnapping of Lola	Raúl Fernández	Rosa Gloria Chagoyán, Rolando Fernández, Frank Moro		
The Realm of Fortune	Arturo Ripstein	Ernesto Gómez Cruz		Selected as the Mexican entry for the Best Foreign Language Film at the 59th Academy Awards

== 1987 ==
Title	Director	Cast	Genre	Notes
Life Is Most Important	Luis Alcoriza	Gonzalo Vega, Ernesto Gómez Cruz, María Rojo		Entered into the 15th Moscow International Film Festival Selected as the Mexican entry for the Best Foreign Language Film at the 60th Academy Awards
Ni de aqui, ni de alla	María Elena Velasco	India María, Sergio Kleiner, Cruz Infante		
La jaula de oro	Sergio Véjar	Mario Almada, Fernando Almada, Isaura Espinoza, Carmen del Valle, Los Tigres del Norte		
Beaks: The Movie	René Cardona Jr.	Christopher Atkins, Michelle Johnson	Horror	
Don't Panic	Rubén Galindo Jr.	Jon Michael Bischof, Gabriela Hassel, Helena Rojo, Jorge Luke		
Geometria	Guillermo del Toro		Short	
Ghost Fever	Lee Madden	Sherman Hemsley, Luis Ávalos, Jennifer Rhodes		Co-production with the United States
La Coyota	Luis Quintanilla Rico	Beatriz Adriana, Juan Valentín, Jorge Vargas, Miguel Ángel Rodríguez		
Las Aventuras de Oliver Twist	Fernando Ruiz		Animation	
The Last Tunnel	Servando González	David Reynoso		Selected as the Mexican entry for the Best Foreign Language Film at the 61st Academy Awards
Treasure of the Moon Goddess	Joseph Louis Agraz	Asher Brauner, Don Calfa, Linnea Quigley		Co-production with the United States
Walker	Alex Cox	Ed Harris, Richard Masur, René Auberjonois, Peter Boyle, Miguel Sandoval, Marlee Matlin		Co-production with the United States

== 1988 ==
Title	Director	Cast	Genre	Notes
Día de muertos	Luis Alcoriza	Fernando Luján, Carmen Salinas		
El último triunfo	Fernando Durán Rojas	Sergio Goyri, Roberto Cañedo, Norma Lazareno, Narciso Busquets		
Escápate conmigo	René Cardona Jr.	Lucerito, Manuel Mijares, Jorge Ortiz de Pinedo		
Night of the Sharks	Tonino Ricci	Treat Williams, Antonio Fargas, Janet Agren		Co-production with Italy and Spain
Pero sigo siendo el rey	René Cardona Jr.	Leonardo Daniel, Jorge Ortiz de Pinedo, Lourdes Munguía, Sonia Infante		
Sábado de mierda	Gregorio Rocha			
The Infernal Rapist	Damián Acosta Esparza	Noé Murayama, Princesa Lea, Ana Luisa Peluffo		
The Penitent	Cliff Osmond	Raul Julia, Armand Assante		Co-production with the United States
The Summer of Miss Forbes	Jaime Humberto Hermosillo	Hanna Schygulla, Francisco Gattorno		
Un sábado más	Sergio Véjar	Pedrito Fernández, Tatiana, José Elías Moreno, Adela Noriega		

== 1989 ==
Title	Director	Cast	Genre	Notes
Rojo Amanecer (Note: Translated as Red Dawn, not to be confused with either the 1984 original or 2012 remake of the same name)	Jorge Fons	Héctor Bonilla, María Rojo	Crime drama	Won the 1989 Silver Ariel Award
Love Lies	Arturo Ripstein	Delia Casanova, Alonso Echánove, Luisa Huertas	Drama	Entered into the 16th Moscow International Film Festival
Narcosatánicos asesinos	Alfonso Zayas	Lina Santos, César Bono, Alfonso Zayas, Tun-Tun, Roberto "Flaco" Guzman	Comedy	
Santa Sangre (Note: Translated as Holy Blood)	Alejandro Jodorowsky	Blanca Guerra, Thelma Tixou	Horror	Screened at the 1989 Cannes Film Festival, competed for Un Certain Regard
Las 7 fugas del Capitan Fantasma	Gilberto de Anda	Sergio Goyri, Jorge Reynoso		
Mi compadre Capulina	Víctor Ugalde	Capulina, Lina Santos, Wolf Ruvinskis		Last movie of Capulina
Lola	María Novaro	Leticia Huijara, Alejandra Cerrillo, Martha Navarro	Drama	Winner of OCIC Award at Berlin International Film Festival
Vacaciones de terror (Note: Translated as Vacations of Terror)	René Cardona III	Pedro Fernández, Julio Alemán, Gabriela Hassel	Thriller	
Grave Robbers	Rubén Galindo Jr.	Fernando Almada, Edna Bolkan, Erika Buenfil, Ernesto Laguardia, María Rebeca	Horror	
Blood Screams	Glen Gebhard	Russ Tamblyn		Co-production with the United States
El rey de los taxistas	Benito Alazraki	Luis de Alba, Maribel Guardia		
Mujer de fuego	Mario Mitriotti	Sonia Infante, Roberto Guzmán, Carlos Montilla, Lucero Cortés		Co-production with Colombia, Venezuela and the United States
Quisiera Ser Hombre	Abel Salazar	Lucero, Guillermo Capetillo, Carlos Riquelme		
Romero	John Duigan	Raúl Juliá, Richard Jordan, Ana Alicia, Harold Gould		Co-production with the United States
Trampa Infernal	Pedro Galindo III	Pedro Fernández, Edith González, Toño Mauri		
