= List of Mexican films of 1973 =

A list of the films produced in Mexico in 1973 (see 1973 in film):

Title	Director	Cast	Genre	Notes
Adiós, amor...	Abel Salazar	Julio Alemán, Saby Kamalich, Marilú Elízaga, Jorge Russek, Armando Sáenz, Eduardo Sobrino	Romantic thriller	
Adiós, New York, adiós	Damian Roja	Andrés García, Blanca Sánchez		
Agonía en tres tiempos				
Ahora sí, chin				
Those Years	Felipe Cazals			Entered into the 8th Moscow International Film Festival
Nefertiti y Aquenatos	Raúl Araiza	Geraldine Chaplin, Salah Zulfikar, John Gavin	Historical	
El profeta Mimí	José Estrada	Ignacio López Tarso, Ana Martín		
Pobre, pero honrada!	Fernando Cortés	La India Maria, Fernando Soler, Norma Lazareno, Ángel Garasa		
Los Cachorros	Jorge Fons	José Alonso, Helena Rojo		
El monasterio de los buitres	Francisco del Villar	Enrique Lizalde, Enrique Álvarez Félix, Irma Serrano		
La Montaña Sagrada	Alejandro Jodorowsky	Alejandro Jodorowsky		
Santo contra los asesinos de otros mundos	Rubén Galindo	Santo, Sasha Montenegro, Marco Antonio Campos "Viruta"		
Tu camino y el mio	Chano Urueta	Vicente Fernández, Blanca Sánchez, Fernando Soto "Mantequilla", Gregorio Casal		
Llanto, risas y nocaut	Julio Aldama	Rubén Olivares, Rafael Herrera, Sergio Ramos "El Comanche", Raúl Macías		
El sonambulo	Miguel Morayta	Capulina, Alicia Encinas		
Capulina contra las momias	Alfredo Zacarias	Capulina, Jacqueline Voltaire, Freddy Fernández, Enrique Pontón		
El castillo de las momias de Guanajuato	Tito Novaro	Superzan, Blue Angel, Tinieblas, Zulma Faiad		Co-production with Guatemala
La yegua colorada	Mario Hernández	Antonio Aguilar, Flor Silvestre, Susana Dosamantes, Narciso Busquets, Cornelio Reyna		
Reed: Insurgent Mexico	Paul Leduc			
Superzan y el niño del espacio	Rafael Lanuza	Superzan, Claudio Lanuza		Filmed in Guatemala.
Uno y medio contra el mundo	José Estrada	Vicente Fernández, Ofelia Medina, Ernesto Gómez Cruz		
Valente Quintero	Mario Hernández	Antonio Aguilar, Saby Kamalich, Narciso Busquets, Sara García, Eleazar García, Cornelio Reyna		
La satánica	Alfredo B. Crevenna	Raúl Ramírez, Norma Lazareno, Ana Luisa Peluffo, Raymundo Capetillo, Marcela Daviland		Co-production with Guatemala.
Entre Monjas Anda el Diablo	René Cardona	Vicente Fernández, Angélica María, Sara García, Alma Rosa Aguirre, Rogelio Guerra		
Blue Demon and Zovek in the Invasion of the Dead	René Cardona	Alejandro Moreno, Professor Zovek		
Don Quijote cabalga de nuevo	Roberto Gavaldón	Cantinflas, Fernando Fernán Gómez, María Fernanda D'Ocón		
El Retorno de Walpurgis	Carlos Aured	Paul Naschy, Fabiola Falcón, Maritza Olivares		Co-production with Spain
El bueno para nada	Gilberto Martínez Solares	Gaspar Henaine "Capulina", Lina Marín, Susana Alexander		
Entre violetas	Gustavo Alatriste			
Huracán Ramírez y la monjita negra	Joselito Rodríguez	Pepe Romay, Titina Romay, Teresa Velázquez		
Los privilegiados	Gustavo Alatriste			
Nosotros los feos		Sara García		
The Mansion of Madness	Juan López Moctezuma	Claudio Brook, Arthur Hansel, Ellen Sherman, Martin LaSalle		
Victorino (Las calles no se siembran)	Gustavo Alatriste			
¡Qué familia tan cotorra!	Fernando Cortés	Guillermo Rivas, Leonorilda Ochoa, Arturo Castro, Amparo Arozamena		

== See also ==
- 1973 in Mexico
