= List of Mexican films of 1975 =

A list of the films produced in Mexico in 1975 (see 1975 in film):

Title	Director	Cast	Genre	Notes
Bellas de noche (Las Ficheras)	Miguel M. Delgado	Sasha Montenegro, Jorge Rivero, Carmen Salínas, Rosa Carmina		
Chanoc en la isla de los muertos	Rafael Pérez Grovas	Humberto Gurza, Ramón Valdés		
The Devil's Rain	Robert Fuest	Ernest Borgnine, Eddie Albert, William Shatner, Keenan Wynn, Tom Skerritt, Joan Prather, Ida Lupino, Anton LaVey	Supernatural horror	Co-production with the United States
Do You Hear the Dogs Barking?	François Reichenbach	Ahuí Camacho, Aurora Clavel, Tamara Garína		Entered into the 1975 Cannes Film Festival
El agente viajero	Rubén Galindo	Antonio Zamora, Pedro Infante Jr., Estela Nuñez, Marco Antonio Campos "Viruta"		
El albañil	José Estrada	Vicente Fernández, Manoella Torres, Alberto Rojas "El Caballo", Dacia González		
El Cristo de los milagros	Rafael Lanuza	Norma Lazareno, Juan Gallardo, Claudio Lanuza		Co-production with Guatemala
El cumpleaños del perro	Jaime Humberto Hermosillo	Diana Bracho, Héctor Bonilla		
El hijo de los pobres	Rubén Galindo	Cornelio Reyna, Estela Nuñez, Benny Ibarra, Marco Antonio Campos "Viruta"		
El investigador Capulina	Gilberto Martínez Solares	Gaspar Henaine "Capulina", Alicia Encinas, Superzan, Tinieblas		
El valle de los miserables	René Cardona Jr.	Mario Almada, Ana Luisa Peluffo, Silvia Mariscal, Alma Muriel, Hugo Stiglitz		
Laberinto de pasiones	Miguel Morayta	Enrique Álvarez Félix, Luz María Aguilar, Nora Larraga "Karla", Irlanda Mora		
La bestia acorralada	Alberto Mariscal	Claudio Brook, Patricia Aspillaga, Gabriel Retes		Post World War II
La loca de los milagros	José María Fernández Unsáin	Libertad Lamarque, Carlos López Moctezuma		
La mafia amarilla	René Cardona Sr.	Blue Demon, Tere Velázquez, Germán Valdés "Tin Tan"		
La pasión según Berenice	Jaime Humberto Hermosillo			
La presidenta municipal	Fernando Cortés	La India María, Adalberto Martínez "Resortes", Fernando Soto "Mantequilla", Pancho Córdova, Polo Ortín, Alfonso Zayas, Manuel "Flaco" Ibáñez		
La venida del Rey Olmos	Julián Pastor	Jorge Martínez de Hoyos, Ana Luisa Peluffo, Maritza Olivares		
México, México, ra, ra, ra	Gustavo Alatriste	Héctor Suárez, Alma Delfína		
Noche de muerte	René Cardona Sr.	Blue Demon, Tere Velázquez, Germán Valdés "Tin Tan"		
Pantaleón y las visitadoras	Mario Vargas Llosa	José Sacristán, Katy Jurado, Rosa Carmina		
Que bravas son las solteras	Tulio Demichelli	Iris Chacón, Jorge Lavat, Olga Breeskin, Manolo Escobar, Paca Gabaldón		Co-production with Spain & Puerto Rico
Satánico pandemonium	Gilberto Martínez Solares	Cecilia Pezet, Enrique Rocha, Delia Magaña		
Simón Blanco	Mario Hernández	Antonio Aguilar, Jacqueline Andere, Valentín Trujillo, Mario Almada, José Carlos Ruiz, Gerardo Reyes, Javier Rúan		
The House in the South	Sergio Olhovich			Entered into the 9th Moscow International Film Festival
Presagio	Luis Alcoriza			
Blacker Than the Night	Carlos Enrique Taboada	Claudia Islas, Lucía Méndez, Susana Dosamantes, Helena Rojo		
Chac: Dios de la lluvia	Rolando Klein	Pablo Canche Balam, Alonso Mendez Ton		
Las fuerzas vivas	Luis Alcoriza			
Las tecnologías pesqueras	Gustavo Alatriste			
Mary, Mary, Bloody Mary	Juan López Moctezuma	Cristina Ferrare, David Young, John Carradine		
Nazareno Cruz and the Wolf	Leonardo Favio	Juan José Camero, Marina Magali, Alfredo Alcón		Co-production with Argentina
Nobleza ranchera		Sara García Juan Gabriel Veronica Castro		
