= List of Mexican films of 1976 =

A list of the films produced in Mexico in 1976 (see 1976 in film):

Title	Director	Cast	Genre	Notes
The Bricklayers	Jorge Fons	Ignacio López Tarso, Katy Jurado		Won the Silver Bear at Berlin
Canoa	Felipe Cazals	Manuel Ojeda, Malena Doria		Won the Jury Grand Prix at Berlin
Matinée	Jaime Humberto Hermosillo			
El hombre de los hongos	Roberto Gavaldón	Isela Vega, Adolfo Marsillach, Sandra Mozarowsky, Philip Michael Thomas		
Las Poquianchis	Felipe Cazals	Diana Bracho, Pilar Pellicer, Tina Romero, Malena Doria, Leonor Llausás		
Letters from Marusia	Miguel Littín	Diana Bracho		Entered into the 1976 Cannes Film Festival
El ministro y yo	Miguel M. Delgado	Cantinflas, Lucía Méndez		
La banda del carro rojo	Rubén Galindo	Mario Almada, Fernando Almada, Pedro Infante Jr., Los Tigres Del Norte		
La ley del monte	Alberto Mariscal	Vicente Fernández, Patricia Aspillaga, Narciso Busquets, Elsa Cárdenas, Julián Soler, Felipe Arriaga		
La virgen de Guadalupe	Alfredo Salazar	Valentín Trujillo, Fernando Allende, Angélica Chain		
Survive!	René Cardona	Hugo Stiglitz, Norma Lazareno		
La India	Rogelio A. González	Isela Vega, Jaime Moreno		
Zona Roja	Emilio Fernández	Fanny Cano, Armando Silvestre, Víctor Junco		
Foxtrot	Arturo Ripstein	Peter O'Toole, Charlotte Rampling, Pedro Armendáriz Jr., Helena Rojo		
Las mariposas disecadas	Sergio Vejar	Silvia Pinal, Gonzalo Vega, Ada Carrasco		
Crónica de un subversivo latinoamericano	Mauricio Walerstein	Claudio Brook, Miguel Ángel Landa, Orlando Urdaneta		Co-production with Venezuela
El miedo no anda en burro	Fernando Cortés	La India María, Eleazar García "Chelelo", Fernando Luján, Emma Roldán		
El karateca azteca	Alfredo Zacarías	Capulina, Blanca Sánchez, Max Kerlow		
Length of War	Gonzalo Martínez Ortega			
The Great Adventure of Zorro	Raúl de Anda Jr.	Rodolfo de Anda, Helena Rojo, Pedro Armendáriz Jr., Carlos López Moctezuma, Jorge Arvizu		
El moro de Cumpas	Mario Hernández	Antonio Aguilar, Flor Silvestre, Rubén Aguirre, Jaime Fernández, Eleazar García "Chelelo", Alicia Encinas		
El apando	Felipe Cazals	Salvador Sánchez, Manuel Ojeda, José Carlos Ruiz		
Beatriz	Gonzalo Suárez	Sandra Mozarowsky, Carmen Sevilla, Nadiuska, Jorge Rivero, José Sacristán	Horror	Co-production with Spain
El buscabullas	Raúl de Anda, Jr.	Rodolfo de Anda, Héctor Suárez, Silvia Manríquez		
Human	Gustavo Alatriste	April Ashley		
The Return of a Man Called Horse	Irvin Kershner	Richard Harris, Gale Sondergaard, Geoffrey Lewis, William Lucking		Co-production with the United States
Tres mujeres en la hoguera	Abel Salazar	Maricruz Olivier, Pilar Pellicer, Maritza Olivares, Rogelio Guerra		

== See also ==
- 1976 in Mexico
