= List of Mexican films of 1979 =

A list of the films produced in Mexico in 1979 (see 1979 in film):

Title	Director	Cast	Genre	Notes
Guyana: Crime of the Century	René Cardona Jr.		Exploitation	
México-Norte	Emilio Fernández	Patricia Reyes Spíndola, Roberto Cañedo		
Cuando tejen las arañas	Roberto Gavaldón	Alma Muriel, Angélica Chaín, Carlos Piñar		
El Chanfle	Enrique Segoviano	Roberto Gómez Bolaños "Chespirito", Florinda Meza, Ramón Valdés, Carlos Villagrán, Rubén Aguirre		
La niña de la mochila azul	Rubén Galindo	Pedrito Fernández, Adalberto Martínez "Resortes", María Rebeca, Mónica Prado, Mario Cid		
Ángel del silencio	Gilberto Martínez Solares	Rogelio Guerra, Rosenda Bernal, Victoria Ruffo		
Chanoc en el circo union	Rafael Pérez Grovas	Ramón Valdés, Alejandro Fuentes, Mario Cid		
Discoteca es amor	Sergio Vejar	Armando Silvestre, Maritza Olivares, Roberto Montiel, Anabelle Gutiérrez, Arlette Pacheco, Victoria Ruffo		
Erótica	Emilio Fernández	Rebeca Silva, Jorge Rivero		
La tía Alejandra	Arturo Ripstein	Isabela Corona, Diana Bracho, Claudio Brook		
El tahúr	Rogelio A. González	Vicente Fernández, Jorge Rivero, Amparo Muñoz, Tito Junco, Lalo el Mimo		
La Viuda de Montiel	Miguel Littín	Geraldine Chaplin, Katy Jurado		Entered into the 30th Berlin International Film Festival
OK Mister Pancho	Gilberto Martínez Solares	La India María, Ramón Valdés, Felicia Mercado, René Ruiz "Tun Tun", Freddy Fernández		
María de mi corazón	Jaime Humberto Hermosillo	María Rojo		
Broken Flag	Gabriel Retes			Entered into the 11th Moscow International Film Festival
Caminos de Michoacán	David Reynoso	Federico Villa, Yolanda del Río, Gerardo Reyes, Beatriz Adriana, Freddy Fernández, David Reynoso, Los Terrícolas		
Day of the Assassin	Brian Trenchard-Smith	Chuck Connors, Glenn Ford, Richard Roundtree, Jorge Rivero, Susana Dosamantes		
En la cuerda del hambre	Gustavo Alatriste			
En la trampa				
La grilla	Gustavo Alatriste			
La ilegal	Arturo Ripstein	Lucía Méndez, Pedro Armendáriz Jr., Fernando Allende		
La vida difícil de una mujer fácil		Sara García		
Midnight Dolls	Rafael Portillo	Jorge Rivero, Isela Vega, Sasha Montenegro		
Nora la rebelde	Mauricio de la Serna	Olga Breeskin, Andrés García		
Te quiero	Tito Davison	Fernando Allende, Daniela Romo, Joaquín Cordero		
The Loving Ones	Rafael Portillo	Isela Vega, Jorge Rivero, Sasha Montenegro		
