= List of Mexican films of the 1970s =

A list of films produced in the Cinema of Mexico in the 1970s, ordered by year of release. For an alphabetical list of articles on Mexican films see Category:Mexican films.

== 1970 ==
- List of Mexican films of 1970

== 1971 ==
- List of Mexican films of 1971

== 1972 ==
- List of Mexican films of 1972

== 1973 ==
- List of Mexican films of 1973

== 1974 ==
- List of Mexican films of 1974

== 1975 ==
- List of Mexican films of 1975

== 1976 ==
- List of Mexican films of 1976

== 1977 ==
- List of Mexican films of 1977

== 1978 ==
- List of Mexican films of 1978

== 1979 ==
- List of Mexican films of 1979
