= Ricardo de Pascual =

Mexican actor and comedian (1940–2026)

- Born: 21 August 1940; Mexico City, Mexico
- Died: 21 April 2026 (aged 85)
- Occupations: Actor; comedian
- Years active: 1958–2026
- Notable work: Señor Calvillo and Señor Hurtado in El Chavo del Ocho
- Spouse: Martha (m. 2014)

Ricardo de Pascual (21 August 1940 – 21 April 2026) was a Mexican actor and comedian who had a lengthy career in Mexican cinema, theatre, and television, remembered as a recurrent character in the Chespirito shows, where he had various roles.

== Early life and career ==
Born in Mexico City on 21 August 1940, de Pascual began his acting career in 1958 under the auspices of renowned comedians Chucho Salinas and Héctor Lechuga and also began working in theatre plays.

In 1972, de Pascual met Roberto Gómez Bolaños (Chespirito) and began acting in his shows, becoming well known for his unpopular role as a rich businessman who wants to tear down the vecindad in El Chavo del Ocho to build a luxurious building in its place. In El Chavo, de Pascual also portrayed a repented robber, who steals from every neighbour of the vecindad until retracting his ways of life at the end of the episode. He also played different roles in Chespirito's production of El Chapulín Colorado. De Pascual's acting career following the times with Chespirito spanned several soap operas and comedic shows. His most renowned roles in soap operas include Senda de gloria, El Privilegio de Amar, Locura de amor and Camaleones.

He also starred in other prominent Mexican shows, including Una familia de diez and Eugenio Derbez's La familia P. Luche.

De Pascual's filmography started in the 1970s in Mexican cinema, by playing roles in El investigador Capulina (1975), El alegre divorciado, and El sonámbulo.

The last role of his career was as Rogelio Diaz / Father Cucho on the TelevisaUnivision soap Monteverde.

== Personal life and death ==
De Pascual met his wife Martha in 2007, while she was a Catholic nun. They both began to exchange messages on social apps and finally met in person in Puebla in 2011. They married in a civil ceremony in 2014, and formalized their marriage in a religious ceremony in 2020, which was held via Zoom due to the then-ongoing COVID-19 pandemic in Mexico.

In 2020, shortly before his religious marriage, De Pascual was diagnosed with COVID-19 and subsequently was diagnosed with a serious case of COPD, being told by doctors that he did not have much time left to live. He said that he smoked heavily during his youth and that he thought it permanently damaged his lungs. He used oxygen all day to help him breathe and reported in an interview with Matilde Obregón that he suffered from other health complications, including vertebral, renal, and cardiac problems. Also around the time of his marriage to his wife Martha, De Pascual was evicted from his property in Mexico City.

As of 2025, de Pascual said that he remained active in his acting career, though he admitted to barely going out of his home if not required, due to his worsening health problems.

De Pascual died on 21 April 2026, at the age of 85. His death was confirmed by a statement of the National Association of Actors, which expressed its condolences and praised de Pascual's career. Reactions to his death were multiple on social media, with users remembering de Pascual for his role in El Chavo and his charisma.
