= The House of Bernarda Alba (disambiguation) =

The House of Bernarda Alba is a play written by Federico García Lorca (1945) that has been made into several films and a musical:

- The House of Bernarda Alba (1982 film), a Mexican film
- The House of Bernarda Alba (1987 film), a Spanish film
- The House of Bernarda Alba (1991 film), a UK film
- Bernarda Alba (musical), a 2006 Off-Broadway musical
