= Black Wind =

Black Wind may refer to:

- Black Wind (Cussler novel), a 2004 Dirk Pitt novel by Clive Cussler and Dirk Cussler
- Black Wind (F. Paul Wilson novel), a novel by F. Paul Wilson
- Black Wind (film), a 1965 Mexican film
- Black Wind, the translation of Machin Shin, an entity in the Wheel of Time series
- "Black Wind", an episode of NCIS: Los Angeles (season 6)
