= Una mujer en la calle =

- Directed by: Alfredo B. Crevenna
- Starring: Marga López; Prudencia Grifell
- Release date: 3 February 1955
- Running time: 1h 30min

Una mujer en la calle is a 1955 Mexican crime film directed by Alfredo B. Crevenna.

== Cast ==
- Marga López – Lucero / Alicia
- Prudencia Grifell – Nena
- Ernesto Alonso – Jose Luis
- José María Linares-Rivas – Carlos
- Raúl Ramírez – Fernando
- Leonor Llausás – Natalia
- Amparo Villegas – Isabel
- Rosa Elena Durgel – Eugenia
- Lupe Carriles – Raquel
- Rosa María Moreno – Prostituta
