= Yanco (disambiguation) =

Yanco is a town in New South Wales, Australia.

Yanco may also refer to:

- Yanco (film), a 1961 Mexican film
- Holly Yanco, American roboticist
- Uncle Yanco (1967), a short documentary film by Agnès Varda
- Yanco, part of Chachapoyas Province in Peru
