= La Coyota =

1987 Mexican action drama film

- Directed by: Luis Quintanilla Rico
- Written by: Carlos Enrique Taboada (adaptation and screenplay)
- Story by: Ernesto Juárez
- Produced by: Beatriz Adriana; Paco Camarena Nario; Arnulfo Delgado; Javier Rivera
- Starring: Beatriz Adriana; Juan Valentín; Jorge Vargas; Miguel Ángel Rodríguez
- Cinematography: Antonio Ruiz
- Edited by: Ángel Camacho
- Music by: Rafael Carrión
- Production company: Producciones del Rey
- Distributed by: Xenon Pictures
- Release date: 22 January 1987 (Mexico)
- Running time: 93 minutes
- Country: Mexico
- Language: Spanish

La Coyota is a 1987 Mexican action drama film directed by Luis Quintanilla Rico and starring Beatriz Adriana, Juan Valentín, Jorge Vargas and Miguel Ángel Rodríguez.

== Plot ==
The film follows the bitter life of Rosalba (Adriana), a woman who has been abused by power since childhood. She becomes a cold and heartless woman, living only for revenge and hatred. However, she opens her heart to Dr. Ramiro Fuentes (Vargas), but the fact that Rosalba has inadvertently made Chencho (Valentín) fall in love with her complicates matters.

== Cast ==
- Beatriz Adriana as Rosalba
  - Katy as child Rosalba (as La niña Katy)
- Juan Valentín as Chencho
- Jorge Vargas as Dr. Ramiro Fuentes
- Marco Antonio Solís as Casimiro
- Miguel Ángel Rodríguez as Don Julián
- Lorenzo de Monteclaro as Justo
- Roberto Cañedo as Don Germán, Casimiro's father
- Noé Murayama as Lucio
- Carlos y José as Singers
- Las Jilguerillas as Singers
- Alfredo Gutiérrez as Pánfilo
- Arturo Benavides as Mayor
- José Chávez as Mauro (as José Chávez Trowe)
- Ernesto Juárez as Heronio
- Alfredo Arroyo as Chencho's brother
- Patricia Páramo
- Inés Murillo as Juana, maid
- María Luciano
- Raúl Valerio as Don Nabor
- Ramiro Ramírez as Farmhand
- Jesús Gómez as Farmhand
- José Luis Rojas
- José Luis Avendaño
- Roberto Ruy
- Rubén Márquez as Elderly farmhand
- Arturo Fernández (as Arturo Delgadillo)
- Martín Brek
- Silvia Derbez as Doña Remedios

== Bibliography ==
- Zavala, Iván. El año pasado, 1987. Plaza y Valdés, 1988.
- Kanoussi, Dora. El pensamiento conservador en México. Plaza y Valdes, 2002.
- Amador, María Luisa; Ayala Blanco, Jorge. Cartelera cinematográfica, 1980-1989. UNAM, 2006.
