= José Estrada =

Jose Estrada may refer to:

- José Estrada Sr. (born 1946), Puerto Rican professional wrestler
- José Estrada Jr., his son, Puerto Rican professional wrestler
- José Estrada (director) (1938–1986), Mexican film director
- José Estrada González (born 1967), Cuban baseball player and Olympic gold medalist

== See also ==
- Jose Marcelo Ejercito, better known as Joseph Estrada, former actor and president of the Philippines
