= The Last Tunnel =

The Last Tunnel may refer to:

- The Last Tunnel (1987 film), a Mexican drama film
- The Last Tunnel (2004 film), a Canadian crime drama film
