= Penthouse (Mexican TV series) =

- Genre: Telenovela
- Created by: Julio Porter
- Directed by: Raúl Araiza Sr
- Starring: Fanny Cano; Raúl Ramírez
- Country of origin: Mexico
- Original language: Spanish

Original release
- Network: Canal de las Estrellas
- Release: 1973

Penthouse, is a Mexican telenovela directed by Raúl Araiza Sr for Televisa in 1973. It stars Fanny Cano and Raúl Ramírez.

== Cast ==
- Fanny Cano
- Raúl Ramírez
- Gregorio Casal
- Germán Robles
- Julieta Bracho
- Leonor Llausás
- Alejandro Parodi
- Wolf Rubinsky
- Martha Roth
- José Loza
- Miguel Gómez Checa
- Arturo Benavides
- Jesús Colin
