= Novia, esposa y amante =

- Poster of the movie
- Directed by: Tulio Demicheli
- Written by: Fernando Goliana
- Produced by: Televicine
- Starring: Pedro Armendáriz Jr. Raúl Ramírez; Daniela Romo; Guillermo Capetillo
- Cinematography: José Ortiz Ramos
- Edited by: Jorge Bustos
- Music by: Nacho Méndez
- Distributed by: Televicine
- Release date: 1980
- Running time: 90 minutes
- Country: Mexico
- Language: Spanish

Novia, esposa y amante (English: Girlfriend, Wife, and Lover) is a Mexican motion picture categorized as drama and romance film released in 1980.

== Synopsis ==
A wealthy young woman studies acting and meets a young film director who offers an independent film starring. Time goes by and they form a couple, but she realizes that he has no interests and aims to be the same thing in life. At the same time, she meets another film director and falls in love with him and then they get married. This man is a former partner of a strong woman who ends up hitting the girl. When her father dies, a friend offers her to take her away from her husband and offers her financial help. This relationship is transformed into an affair.

== Cast ==
- Pedro Armendáriz Jr. → Esteban Ampudia
- Raúl Ramírez → Rodolfo Morales
- Mónica Prado → Irene
- Guillermo Capetillo → Juan
- Carlos East → Mr. Mendoza
- Daniela Romo → Laura Mendoza
- Víctor Junco → Engineer
- Marcelo Villamil → Painter
