= The Incredible Professor Zovek =

- Directed by: René Cardona
- Written by: René Cardona; Chano Urueta
- Produced by: Alberto López
- Starring: Professor Zovek; Germán Valdés «Tin-Tan»; Teresa Velázquez; Nubia Martí
- Cinematography: José Ortiz Ramos
- Edited by: Alfredo Rosas Priego
- Music by: Raúl Lavista
- Production companies: Producciones Nova; Productora Fílmica Real
- Release date: 11 May 1972
- Running time: 79 minutes
- Country: Mexico
- Language: Spanish

The Incredible Professor Zovek (Spanish: El increíble profesor Zovek) is a 1972 Mexican comedy film, produced by Alberto López, written and directed by René Cardona, and starring Professor Zovek, Germán Valdés «Tin-Tan», Teresa Velázquez and Nubia Martí.

== Plot ==
When a plane carrying 26 scientists blows up, only 25 bodies are found. Professor Zovek must determine who the 26th person was. Zovek must stop evil scientist Dr. Druso's plans for world domination.

== Cast ==
- Professor Zovek as himself
- Germán Valdés «Tin-Tan» as Chalo
- Teresa Velázquez
- José Galvez as Dr. Leobardo Druso
- Nubia Martí as Virginia
- Yerye Beirute
- Arturo Silva
- René Barrera
- Juan José Martínez Casado
- Gloria Chávez
- Henry Trim
- María Cardinal
