= A Few Drinks =

- Spanish: Cuatro copas
- Directed by: Tulio Demicheli
- Written by: Tulio Demicheli; Alfredo Varela
- Produced by: Sergio Kogan
- Starring: Libertad Lamarque; Miguel Aceves Mejía; Raúl Ramírez
- Cinematography: Agustín Martínez Solares
- Edited by: Carlos Savage
- Music by: Gonzalo Curiel
- Production company: Alfa Film
- Release date: 2 April 1958
- Running time: 90 minutes
- Country: Mexico
- Language: Spanish

A Few Drinks (Spanish: Cuatro copas) is a 1958 Mexican musical film written and directed by Tulio Demicheli and starring Libertad Lamarque, Miguel Aceves Mejía and Raúl Ramírez.

The film's sets were designed by the art director Gunther Gerzso.

== Cast ==
- Libertad Lamarque as Eugenia Pavel
- Miguel Aceves Mejía as Miguel
- Raúl Ramírez as Jorge del Río
- Miguel Manzano as Felipe
- Leonor Llausás as Elena
- Celia Tejeda as cook
- Luis Manuel Pelayo as doctor
- Amparo Arozamena as Panfilo's employee
- Alberto Catalá as producer
- Celia Manzano as maid
- Nacho Contla as Don Panfilo
- Antonio Bravo as Señor Núñez
- Julián Colman
- Rubén Zepeda Novelo as announcer
- Guillermo Hernández as man with a mug
- José Muñoz as Don Melquiades
- Francisco Pando as bartender
- Carlos Robles Gil as Party guest
- Hernán Vera as Don Panfilo's client
