= Blue Demon contra las diabólicas =

- Theatrical release poster
- Directed by: Chano Urueta
- Written by: Guillermo Hernández; Fernando Osés; Chano Urueta
- Produced by: Reynaldo P. Portillo; Rafael Pérez Grovas
- Starring: Blue Demon; David Reynoso; Ana Martín
- Cinematography: Alfredo Uribe
- Edited by: Alfredo Uribe
- Music by: Gustavo César Carrión; Ernesto Cortázar hijo
- Distributed by: Cinematográfica RA; Estudios América
- Release date: 1967
- Running time: 87 minutes
- Country: Mexico
- Language: Spanish

Blue Demon contra las diabólicas (also known as Blue Demon vs. the Infernal Brains) is a 1966 (various sources also say 1967) Mexican horror film. It was directed by Chano Urueta and stars David Reynoso, Ana Martín and the wrestler Blue Demon.
