= José Alonso (actor) =

Mexican film and telenovela actor (born 1947)

- Born: José Alonso Zepeda Palacios; 18 November 1947 (age 78); Mexico City, Mexico
- Occupation: Actor
- Spouse: Irma Lozano
- Children: María

José Alonso Zepeda Palacios (born 18 November 1947) is a Mexican film and telenovela actor.

== Awards ==
=== Ariel Awards ===
The Ariel Awards are awarded annually by the Mexican Academy of Film Arts and Sciences in Mexico. José Alonso has received two awards out of five nominations.

Year	Nominee / work	Award	Result
1979	En La Trampa	Best Actor	Won
1992	La Tarea	Best Actor	Nominated
1993	Bartolomé de las Casas (La Leyenda Negra)	Best Actor	Nominated
1996	Mujeres Insumisas	Best Actor	Nominated
2001	Crónica de un Desayuno	Best Supporting Actor	Won

== Filmography ==
=== Film ===
- Tajimara (1965)
- El día de las madres (1969)
- Trampa para un cadáver (1969)
- Paula (1969)
- Las bestias jóvenes (1970)
- Fallaste corazón (1970)
- La agonía de ser madre (1970)
- Las hermanas (1971)
- Tómalo como quieras (1971)
- Las reglas del juego (1971)
- Intimidades de una secretaria (1971)
- Papa en onda (1971)
- Una vez en la noche (1971)
- La derrota (1973)
- Los cachorros (1973)
- El hombre desnudo (1976)
- Los albañiles (1976)
- Mina, tiempo de libertad (1977)
- Naufragio (1978)
- María de mi corazón (1979)
- En la trampa (1979)
- Amor libre (1979)
- El vuelo de la cigüeña (1979)
- Complot Petróleo: La cabeza de la hidra (1981)
- El gran mogollón (1982)
- La fuga de Carrasco (1983)
- Motel]] (1984)
- Pesadilla (1985)
- Playa prohibida (1985)
- Trazos en blanco (1985)
- El misterio de la casa abandonada (1987)
- Sandino (1990)
- La tarea (1991)
- El bulto (1992)
- Anoche soñé contigo (1992)
- Fray Bartolomé de las casas (1993)
- Bodas negras (1994)
- Magnicidio (1995)
- Mujeres insumisas (1995)
- Mujeres infieles (1995)
- La ley de las mujeres (1995)
- Crisis (1998)
- Crónica de un desayuno (1999)
- Blind Heart (2002)
- Corazón de melón (2003)
- La gran sangre - La película (2007)
- El garabato (2008)
- Kada kien su karma (2008)
- Ángel caído (2010)

=== Telenovelas ===
- Amor sublime (1967)
- Cuna vacía (1967)
- Leyendas de México (1968)
- Un grito en la obscuridad (1968) .... Héctor
- Cárcel de mujeres (1968)
- Simplemente vivir (1968)
- Mi maestro (1968)
- Los Caudillos (1968) .... Mina
- Rosario (1969)
- El mariachi (1970) .... Refugio
- Las máscaras (1971) .... Gaspar
- Las fieras (1972) .... Jean Brisson
- La tierra (1973) .... Alberto
- Cartas sin destino (1973) .... Fabián
- El milagro de vivir (1975).... Héctor Alvarado
- Mundos opuestos (1976) .... José Alberto de la Mora
- Cartas para una víctima (1978)
- Pasiones encendidas (1978)
- Amor prohibido (1979) .... Manuel
- Colorina (1980) .... Iván
- El árabe (1980) .... Ernesto Illinworth
- Una limosna de amor (1981) .... Luis Alfonso
- Gabriel y Gabriela (1982) .... Renato Reyes
- Abandonada (1985) .... Ernesto
- Monte calvario (1986).... Octavio Montero
- Senda de gloria (1987) .... Héctor Álvarez
- Tal como somos (1987) .... Ángel Cisneros
- El precio de la fama (1987) .... Sergio Ferrer
- La casa al final de la calle (1989) .... Bronski
- Alcanzar una estrella II (1991) .... Leonardo Lascuráin
- Con toda el alma (1996) .... Ítalo Linares
- Rivales por accidente (1997) .... Vladimiro
- La chacala (1998) .... Padre Isaías
- La casa del naranjo (1998)
- Háblame de amor (1999) .... Guillermo
- Tío Alberto (2000) .... Enrique Sotomayor
- Lo que es el amor (2001) .... Fausto Ocampo
- El país de las mujeres (2002) .... Don Lucio
- La hija del jardinero (2003) .... Fernando Alcántara
- Montecristo (2006) .... Horacio Díaz Herrera
- Alma legal (2008) .... Víctor
- Pasión Morena (2009) .... Adolfo Rueda
- Vidas Robadas (2010) .... Antonio Fernández Vidal
- A corazón abierto (2012) .... Don Gualberto
- Los Rey (2012) .... Pedro Malvido
