= Como gallos de pelea =

- Directed by: Arturo Martinez
- Written by: Arturo Martínez; Ramón Obón
- Produced by: Alfonso Rosas Priego
- Starring: Sara García, Valentin Trujillo, Lucy Tovar, Tito Junco
- Cinematography: Raúl Domínguez
- Edited by: Ángel Camacho
- Music by: Luis Arcaraz Jr. Francisco Salcido
- Release date: 1977
- Running time: 90 minutes
- Country: Mexico
- Language: Spanish

Como gallos de pelea ("As Fighting Cocks") is a 1977 Mexican film written and directed by Arturo Martínez, and starring Sara García, Valentin Trujillo, Lucy Tovar and Tito Junco. This film features the last appearance of Fernando Soto "Mantequilla".

== Synopsis ==
For several years Altagracia has refused to sell the property to Fernando who has been harassing her, but when Carlos comes from the city, he decides to sell the property. Carlos discovers the atrocities made by Fernando and his accomplices while he discovers the amazing beauty of Maria so he decides to keep the property and defend it with his life.

== Cast ==
- Valentín Trujillo as Carlos
- Sara García as Doña Altagracia
- Lucy Tovar as María
- Tito Junco as Don Fernando Gómez
- Ángel Garasa is Sacerdote
- Fernando Soto "Mantequilla" as Juan (as Fernando Soto 'Mantequilla')
- Quintín Bulnes as Anibal
- Mario Cid
- Celia Viveros
- Luis Arcaraz Jr.
- José Luis Padilla
- Luis Guevara (as Luis 'Gordo' Guevara')
- Alfredo Gutiérrez (as Alfredo Gutiérrez 'El Turco')
- Lauro Salazar
- Jorge España
- Humberto Johnson
- Fabián Aranza (as Fabian)
- Irene Green
