= Pero sigo siendo el rey =

1988 film by René Cardona Jr.

- Directed by: René Cardona Jr.
- Starring: Leonardo Daniel; Jorge Ortiz de Pinedo; Sonia Infante; Lourdes Munguía; Edith González; Lina Santos; Norma Herrera
- Music by: José Alfredo Jiménez
- Release date: 1988 (Mexico)
- Country: Mexico
- Language: Spanish

Pero sigo siendo el rey ("But I'm Still the King" in Spanish) is a 1988 Mexican musical drama film, directed by René Cardona Jr. and starring Leonardo Daniel, Jorge Ortiz de Pinedo, Lourdes Munguía, and Sonia Infante. The film is a biopic that portrays the life of Mexican singer-songwriter José Alfredo Jiménez, and its title comes from Jiménez's song "El Rey".

== Cast ==
- Leonardo Daniel as José Alfredo Jiménez
- Jorge Ortiz de Pinedo
- Sonia Infante
- Lourdes Munguía
- Edith González
- Lina Santos
- Norma Herrera
- Norma Lazareno
- Rafael Amador
- Mario Arévalo
- Alfredo Wally Barrón
- Manuel Benítez
- Aida Cuevas
- Consuelo Duval
- Pablo Ferrel
- Humberto Herrera
- Alfredo Lara
- Tania Libertad
- Aurora Martínez
- Lupita Peruyero
- María Eugenia Ríos
- Alicia Sandoval
- Lupita Sandoval
- Ernesto Schwartz
- Laura Sotelo
- Jorge Zamora

== Production ==
The film was made after the success of Sabor a mí, a biopic about the Mexican singer-songwriter Álvaro Carrillo, also directed by René Cardona Jr. The life of José Alfredo Jiménez had already been portrayed in cinema before in Que te vaya bonito (1978); however, Pero sigo siendo el rey had a bigger budget.

== Reception ==
Cinema Ameriq Latine 2000 criticized the film, saying that it was "weighed down by too narrow a view of the forms a genuinely popular artist's existence took" and that it was "a plethora of historical incongruities." It also highlights that the film "abuses the use of songs (which add up to 22), which add nothing or almost nothing to the logic or structure of the story, and most of them are executed without the minimum necessary encouragement to make them moving."
