= Q.R.R (Quien resulte responsable) =

- Directed by: Gustavo Alatriste
- Release date: 1970
- Running time: 100 minute
- Country: Mexico
- Language: Spanish

Q.R.R (Quien resulte responsable) ("Whoever is Responsible") is a 1970 Mexican film. It was directed by Gustavo Alatriste.
