= Leonor Llausás =

Mexican actress (1929–2003)

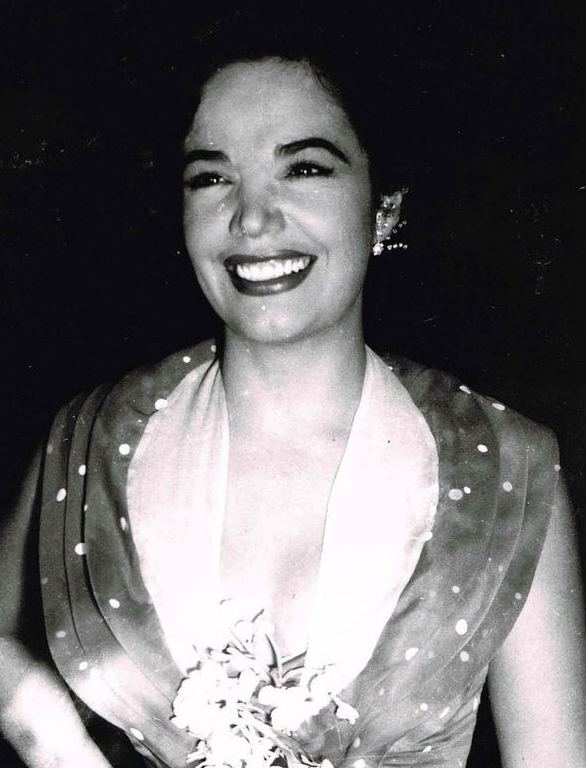
- Llausás, c. 1950s
- Born: Leonor Llausás Tostado; August 3, 1929; Durango, México
- Died: February 13, 2003 (aged 73); Mexico City, Mexico
- Occupation: Actress
- Years active: 1953-1997

Leonor Llausás Tostado (August 3, 1929 — February 13, 2003) was a Mexican television and film actress who appeared in over 100 works of film and television. She was nominated multiple times for the Ariel Awards and won a Best Actress award in 1955 from the film Los Fernandez we peralvillo, in 1975 won Diosa de Plata (Silver Goddess Award) for Las poquianchis. She also was awarded the "Virginia Fabregas" medal of honor by the Mexican National Association of Actors.

== Biography ==
Leonor Llausás Tostado was born in Durango, Mexico on August 3, 1929. She studied acting under the Japanese master, Seki Sano and debuted on stage in 1952 with Edmundo Baez's play, "Un Alfiler en los Ojos" (A Pin in the Eyes).

The following year she made her film debut in the film "El vagabundo" (The Wanderer) with Germán Valdés, known more widely as "Tin Tan". She was a prolific actress on both film and television, starring in movies such as "Ensayo de un crimen" (Test of a Crime) by Luis Buñuel; "Viva Tepito"; "Los Fernández of Peralvillo" (Fernandez of Peralvillo), based on the novel by Juan H. Durán y Casahonda; and "Las Poquianchis". She was nominated for an Ariel for "Viva Tepito", won an Ariel for Best Actress for "Los Fernández and from Diosa de Plata (Silver Goddess Award) for "Las Poquianchis".

She had her television debut in 1973 with the production, "Penthouse". She went on to perform in many important telenovelas such as "Tal Como Somos" (As We Are), "Juana Iris", "Martín Garatuza", "La Pasión de Isabela" (The Passion of Isabela) and "El Reto" (The Challenge), as well as "El Premio Mayor" (The Jackpot).

In 1987 she was awarded the "Virginia Fabregas" medal of honor by the National Association of Actors (ANDA). Some of her later roles were in films such as Historia de una mujer escandalosa" (1984), "Asesinato en la Plaza Garibaldi" (1987) y "Pánico en el bosque" (1989).

Her last job was as an actress in the telenovela "Salud, dinero y amor" (Health, money and love), the sequel to "The Jackpot", in which she was playing the protagonist's mother.

== Death ==
She died on February 13, 2003, in Mexico City.

== Awards and nominations ==
- 1955, "Los Fernández de Peralvillo", best actress, Won Ariel Award
- 1956, "Una mujer en la calle", best actress, nominated for Ariel
- 1957, "Talpa", best actress, nominated for Ariel
- 1975, "Las poquianchis", best actress, Won Diosa de Plata
- 1977, "Las poquianchis", best actress, nominated for Ariel
- 1981, "Que viva Tepito!" best supporting actress, nominated for Ariel
- 1987, awarded the "Virginia Fabregas" medal of honor, ANDA

== Selected filmography ==
=== Telenovelas ===
- Penthouse (1973)
- La hiena (1973) .... Sacra
- Lágrimas de amor (1979)
- La pasión de Isabela (1984)
- Juana Iris (1985) .... Gudelia
- Martín Garatuza (1986) .... Cleofas
- Tal como somos (1987)
- Dulce desafío (1988) .... Gregoria
- La casa al final de la calle (1989)
- Simplemente Maria (1989) ....
- Teresa (1989) .... Gudelia
- Días sin luna (1990)
- Madres egoístas (1991) .... Josefa
- Yo no creo en los hombres (1991) .... Honoria
- La sonrisa del diablo (1992) ....
- Las secretas intenciones (1993) .... Emma
- Volver a empezar (1994)
- El premio mayor (1995) .... Doña Anita López de Domínguez
- Salud, dinero y amor (1997) .... Doña Anita López de Domínguez

=== TV series ===
- Aprendamos juntos (1982)
- Hora marcada (1986)

=== Films ===
- The Vagabond (1953)
- Los Fernández de Peralvillo (1954)
- La Desconocida (1954)
- Una mujer en la calle (1955)
- El pueblo sin Dios (1955)
- Ensayo de un crimen (1955)
- Talpa (1956)
- Cien muchachas (1957)
- Al compás del rock and roll (1957)
- Cuatro copas (1958)
- Maratón de baile (1958)
- La edad de la tentación (1959)
- La ley del más rápido (1959)
- La tijera de oro (1960)
- Herencia trágica (1960)
- Two Cheap Husbands (1960)
- Una canción para recordar (1960)
- El asaltacaminos (1962)
- La Muerte en el desfiladero (1963)
- Tacos al carbón (1972)
- La derrota (1973)
- La tigresa (1973)
- Fe, esperanza y caridad (1974)
- La casa de Bernarda Alba (1974)
- ...Y la mujer hizo al hombre (1975)
- Chin Chin el Teporocho (1976)
- Las poquianchis (1976)
- Los albañiles (1976)
- La viuda negra (1977)
- La güera Rodríguez (1978)
- Los amantes fríos (1978)
- Los pequeños privilegios (1978)
- El año de la peste (1979)
- Guyana: Crime of the Century (1979)
- Crónica roja (1979)
- Palenque sangriento (1980)
- Para usted jefe (1980)
- Misterio (1980)
- Allá en la plaza Garibaldi (1981)
- El héroe desconocido (1981)
- Que viva Tepito! (1981)
- El infierno de todos tan temido (1981)
- El día que murió Pedro Infante (1982)
- Una leyenda de amor (1982)
- La casa de Bernarda Alba (1982)
- Es mi vida (1982)
- Cosa fácil (1982)
- Un hombre llamado el diablo (1983)
- Eréndira (1983)
- Under Fire (1983)
- Veneno para las hadas (1984)
- El mil usos II (1984)
- La muerte cruzó el río Bravo (1984)
- Historia de una mujer escandalosa (1984)
- Noche de carnaval (1984)
- El tonto que hacía milagros (1984)
- El billetero (1984)
- Gavilán o paloma (1985)
- El embustero (1985)
- Little Treasure (1985)
- Mexican, You Can Do It (Mexicano ¡Tú puedes!) (1985)
- Los náufragos del Liguria (1985)
- Historias violentas (1985)
- La pintada (1986)
- El otro (1986)
- Amor a la vuelta de la esquina (1986)
- Astucia (1986)
- El imperio de la fortuna (1986)
- Robachicos (1986)
- Asesinato en la plaza Garibaldi (1987)
- La pandilla infernal (1987)
- Les pyramides bleues (1988)
- Pánico en el bosque (1989)
- El motel de la muerte (1990)
- Filtraciones (1992)
- De muerte natural (1996)
