= Mujer de fuego =

- Directed by: Mario Mitriotti
- Starring: Sonia Infante; Roberto Guzmán; Carlos Montilla; Lucero Cortés
- Release date: 1989
- Countries: Colombia; Venezuela; Mexico; United States
- Language: Spanish

Mujer de fuego is a 1989 drama film directed by Mario Mitriotti. Co-produced by Colombia, Venezuela, Mexico and the United States, it was released in Colombian theaters on 18 February 1989. It starred Sonia Infante, Roberto Guzmán, Carlos Montilla and Lucero Cortés.

== Plot ==
Corina, a woman from a humble background, loses her son at the hands of a corrupt policeman. Unable to seek justice through legal channels, she decides to join the powerful drug cartels to get enough support to avenge the death of her son.

== Main cast ==
- Sonia Infante as Corina.
- Roberto Guzmán as the costeño.
- Carlos Montilla as Alfredo.
- Lucero Cortés as Estela.
