= Pasiones encendidas =

Mexican telenovela

- Genre: Telenovela
- Created by: Fernanda Villeli; Marissa Garrido
- Directed by: Arturo Salgado
- Starring: Veronica Castro; Valentin Trujillo; Amparo Rivelles
- Country of origin: Mexico
- Original language: Spanish

Production
- Executive producer: Ernesto Alonso
- Cinematography: Ernesto Alonso

Original release
- Network: Canal de las Estrellas
- Release: 1978

Pasiones encendidas is a Mexican telenovela produced by Ernesto Alonso for Televisa in 1978.

== Cast ==
- Valentin Trujillo as Marcial
- Amparo Rivelles as María
- Jorge Vargas as Eduardo
- Fernando Balzaretti as Antonio
- Carlos Bracho as Fernando
- Aarón Hernán as Luis / Luciano
- Susana Alexander as Adriana
- Veronica Castro as Martha
- Andrea Palma
- Rita Macedo as Elvira
- María Rubio as Lidia
- María Martin as Prudencia
- Marina Dorell
- José Alonso
- Tony Bravo
- Julieta Egurrola
