= Atrapada (1991 TV series) =

Mexican telenovela

- Genre: Telenovela; Drama
- Created by: Liliana Abud; Carmen Daniels
- Written by: Liliana Abud; Carmen Daniels; Tere Medina
- Directed by: José Caballero
- Starring: Christian Bach; Héctor Bonilla; Guillermo Capetillo; Alma Muriel; Frank Moro; Guillermo García Cantú; Gerardo Murguía
- Opening theme: Entre agua y fuego by Jerardo
- Country of origin: Mexico
- Original language: Spanish
- No. of episodes: 180 (of 21-22 minutes); 95 (of 41-44 minutes)

Production
- Executive producer: Ernesto Alonso
- Production locations: Mexico City, Mexico
- Cinematography: Jesús Acuña Lee
- Running time: 21-22 minutes
- Production company: Televisa

Original release
- Network: Canal de las Estrellas
- Release: August 19, 1991 – April 24, 1992

Related
- En carne propia; La sonrisa del Diablo

Atrapada (Trapped) is a Mexican telenovela produced by Ernesto Alonso for Televisa in 1991.

Christian Bach and Héctor Bonilla starred as protagonists, while Guillermo Capetillo and Raquel Olmedo starred as antagonists.

== Plot ==
It all begins at the end of the year party given by the millionaire Montero family. Antonio Montero, president of the Montermex companies, is found dead supposedly due to a suicide, but Camila, Antonio's daughter, is convinced that her father was murdered to remove him from the path and control of the companies.

This is how suspicions and intrigues begin. They are all suspects, including the men Camila has loved: René Pizarro, her first boyfriend; Ángel Montero, with whom she also fell in love; and Gonzalo Rodríguez, with whom she ended up marrying, without love. No one learned of the latter's presence at the party until one of the employees claimed to have seen him that night at the Montero home.

But little by little more deaths will occur that will cause Camila to be trapped in a vortex of pain, anguish and suspense. Could the murderer be one of Camila's loves? Will he want to kill her too, since she has decided to find out who killed her father at all costs?

== Cast ==
- Christian Bach as Camila Montero
- Héctor Bonilla as Gonzalo Rodríguez
- Guillermo Capetillo as Ángel Montero
- Alma Muriel as Luisa
- Frank Moro as Jaime
- Guillermo García Cantú as Víctor Montero
- Gerardo Murguía as René Pizarro
- Margarita Gralia as Adela
- Rosario Gálvez as Tomasa
- Ernesto Godoy as Raúl
- Marisol Santacruz as Sonia Montero
- Rodrigo Vidal as Luis
- Sofía Álvarez as Alicia Montero
- Roberto Antúnez as Claudio López Naranjo
- Julieta Egurrola as Fina Montero
- Raquel Olmedo as Marcia Montero
- Macaria as Rita
- Raul Román as David
- Mario Casillas as Aníbal Montero
- Armando Araiza as Fernando
- Lucero Lander as Elisa Pizarro
- Carlos Cardán as Manuel
- Dunia Saldívar as Lola
- Alicia Fahr as Nina
- Marichelo as Mimí
- Arturo Beristáin as Eduardo
- Jerardo as Efraín
- Miguel Suárez as Don Fernando
- Gerardo Vigil as Ledezma
- Lucero Rojas as Daniela
- Jorge Fegan as Dr. Salas
- David Rencoret as Dr. Orozco
- María Rebeca as Gloria
- Mauricio Ferrari as Antonio Montero
- Alejandro Ruiz as Octavio
- Ofelia D'Rosas as Verónica
- Leandro Martínez as Don Paco
- Evangelina Sosa as Lupita
- Rosita Quintana as Jane Solís
- Felio Heliel as Dr. Wilfredo Salas
