= El día de las madres =

- Starring: Sara García; Marga López; Amparo Rivelles; Fernando Soler; Andrés Soler; Jacqueline Andere; José Alonso
- Release date: 1969
- Country: Mexico
- Language: Spanish

El día de las madres ("Mothers' Day") is a 1969 Mexican film starring Sara García.
