= Capetillo family =

Capetillo is a Mexican family with a long tradition in bullfighting. Among the most famous members are:

- Manuel Capetillo, a matador
- Guillermo Capetillo, a singer/actor and bullfighter and son of Manuel
- Eduardo Capetillo, a singer/actor and half-brother of Guillermo and Manolito

== See also ==
- Raymundo Capetillo, a Mexican actor not related to the above
- Pedro Casillas Capetillo, a Knight of Maestranza de Caballería de Castilla & other Royal Orders, Heraldry Advisor, Private Consultant, University Professor and Company Director
