= Chayito Valdez =

Mexican singer and actress

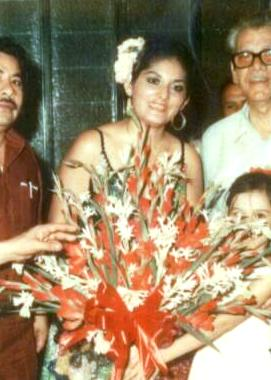
- Valdez in 1975

Background information
- Born: María del Rosario Valdez Campos; 28 May 1945; Orba, Sinaloa, Mexico
- Died: 19 June 2016 (aged 71) Coronado, California, U.S.

María del Rosario Valdez Campos (28 May 1945 – 19 June 2016), known professionally as Chayito Valdez, was a Mexican singer and actress from Sinaloa. She was associated with and contributed to the folk music of Mexico.

== Biography ==
Valdez was born in Orba, Guasave Municipality, Sinaloa. She started her music career at an early age participating in amateur competitions with songs such as "La Cigarra", "Historia de un amor", "La Bikina", and "Leña de Pirul". Her godmother was Amalia Mendoza, a successful singer known as "La Tariácuri", and in the early 1970s, she recorded four songs the Sinaloan city of Los Mochis: "Besos y Copas", "Una Noche me Embriagué", "Una Sombra", and "Amor que Muere", which earned her a reputation as a Mexican folk singer. She won the fifth Festival de la Canción Ranchera with the song "No me pregunten por él".

Valdez moved to Los Angeles, California in 1982 and became a US citizen. On September 17, 1985, she suffered an automobile accident that left her in a wheelchair, but after a long recovery began making public appearances again. In June 2003 she suffered a cerebral hemorrhage and fell into a coma for 50 days. Her last show was in Nogales, Sonora. She spent her last days in a persistent vegetative state in a hospital in Coronado, California, where she died on 19 June 2016.

== Works ==
=== Music ===
During her 30-year career, Valdez contributed over 300 hits and 1500 recorded songs to the Mexican musical heritage. Her musical legacy includes the following:

==== Corridos de Caballos (traditional Mexican ballads) ====
- "El moro de Cumpas"
- "Caballo prieto afamado"
- "Caballo prieto azabache"
- "El alazán y el rosillo"
- "El cantador"
- "Caballo Tequila"
- "Caballo alazán lucero"
- "Los dos alazanes"

==== Traditional Songs ====
- "San Juan del Río"
- "Mi soldadita"
- "La gallera"
- "Lindo Michoacán"
- "El sinaloense"
- "Sonora querida"
- "Acuarela potosina"
- "Pelea de gallos"

==== Romantic boleros ====
- "Compréndeme"
- "Mía nomás"
- "Sentencia"
- "Besos callejeros"
- "No vuelvas"
- "Ojazos negros"

=== Television ===
Valdez appeared in Mexican television programs such as:

- Siempre en domingo
- Noches tapatías
- El estudio de Lola
- Hoy mismo
- Para gente grande
- Aún hay más
- Nuestra gente

=== Film ===
- Hijos de tigre (1980)
- El charro del misterio (1980)
- Pasión por el peligro (1979)
- La hija del contrabando (1977)
- Tierra de valientes (1987)
- Caballo prieto afamado (1977)
- En el camino andamos
- Los 4 jinetes del Apocalipsis
- Pistoleros famosos II
- El ratero de la vecindad
- Pánico en la Frontera
- Zacazonapan (1976)
- De la gloria al infierno
- Hasta el último trago... corazón (documentary 2005)
