= Las tecnologías pesqueras =

- Directed by: Gustavo Alatriste
- Release date: 1975
- Running time: 25 minute
- Country: Mexico
- Language: Spanish

Las tecnologías pesqueras ("The Fishing Technologies") is a 1975 Mexican film. It was directed by Gustavo Alatriste.
