= México, México, ra, ra, ra =

- Directed by: Gustavo Alatriste
- Release date: 1975
- Running time: 137 minute
- Country: Mexico
- Language: Spanish

México, México, ra, ra, ra is a 1975 Mexican film. It was directed by Gustavo Alatriste.
