= Guillermo Capetillo =

Mexican actor (born 1958)

- Born: Guillermo Eduardo Capetillo de Flores; 30 April 1958 (age 66); Mexico City, Mexico
- Occupations: Actor; matador; singer; bullfighter
- Years active: 1978–present
- Spouse: Tania Amezcua Riquenes (m. 2006-2009)

Guillermo Eduardo Capetillo de Flores (born 30 April 1958) is a Mexican actor, singer and matador.

== Family ==
Capetillo was born in Mexico City, and is a member of the Capetillo family. His father (Manuel Capetillo, Sr.) (1926-2009) and his brother, actor Manuel Capetillo, Jr. are also matadors, his brother Eduardo Capetillo is a singer and actor. He was married to television presenter Tania Amezcua Riquenes from 2006 to 2009.

Guillermo acquired notoriety on the worldwide famous telenovela Los Ricos También Lloran (1979), where he played the role of Verónica Castro's son. He also acted with Castro in Rosa Salvaje (in which he played Castro's lover Ricardo and brother in law Rogelio) and Pueblo chico, infierno grande.

=== Telenovelas ===
Year	Title	Character	Note
2015	Lo imperdonable	Padre Juan	Supporting Role
2012-2013	Amores verdaderos	Nelson Brizz	Antagonist
2010-2011	Cuando Me Enamoro	Antonio Iriondo	Supporting Role
2010	Soy tu dueña	Rogelio Villalba	Special Appearance
2008-2009	Mañana es para siempre	Aníbal Elizalde Rivera	Antagonist
2005	Pablo y Andrea	Juan Carlos Saavedra	Adult Protagonist
2004-2005	Mision S.O.S	Salvador Martínez	Adult Protagonist
1999-2000	Tres mujeres	Manuel Toscano	Supporting Role
1998	Una Luz en el Camino	Rodrigo Gonzalez de Alba	Adult Protagonist
1997	Pueblo Chico, Infierno Grande	Hermilo Jaimez	Co-Protagonist
1991-1992	Atrapada	Ángel Montero	Main Antagonist
1987-1988	Rosa Salvaje	Ricardo / Rogelio Linares	Protagonist
1986	Los cuervos	Andrés Albán	Supporting Role
1983-1984	La Fiera	Víctor Alfonso Martínez Bustamante	Protagonist
1980-1981	Colorina	José Miguel Redes	Supporting Role
1979-1980	Los Ricos También Lloran	Alberto "Beto" López (Salvatierra)	Co-protagonist

== Films ==
- Si Nos Dejan (1999)
- Quisiera Ser Hombre (1988)
- La Mafia Tiembla (1986)
- Ases del Contrabando (1985)
- El Hijo de Pedro Navaja (1985)
- Novia, Esposa y Amante (1981)

== Albums ==
- Una vez más el amor (1987)
- Mujer (1982)
