= Mexican, You Can Do It =

1985 film

- Film poster
- Directed by: José Estrada
- Written by: Olivia Michel
- Produced by: Luz Maria Rojas
- Starring: Sergio Jiménez; Carmen Salinas; Arturo Alegro; Isabela Corona; Mario del Mar; Alma Delfina; Roxana Frias; Mario García González; Mario García Gonzalez; Gloria Alicia Inclán; Leonor Llausás; Juan Ángel Martínez; Martha Meneses; Antonio Miguel; Ana Ofelia Murguía; Rubén Rojo; Lupita Sandoval; Licia Suárez; Ernesto Yáñez
- Cinematography: Miguel Garzón
- Music by: Pedro Plascencia Salinas
- Release dates: July 1985 (Moscow); 12 September 1985
- Running time: 110 minutes
- Country: Mexico
- Language: Spanish

Mexican, You Can Do It (Spanish: Mexicano ¡Tú puedes!) is a 1985 Mexican drama film directed by José Estrada. It was entered into the 14th Moscow International Film Festival.

== Cast ==
In alphabetical order

- Arturo Alegro
- Mario Casillas
- Isabela Corona
- Alma Delfina
- Roxana Frias
- Mario García González
- Sergio Jiménez
- Leonor Llausás
- Juan Ángel Martínez
- Antonio Miguel
- Ana Ofelia Murguía
- Rubén Rojo
- Carmen Salinas
