= Los privilegiados =

- Directed by: Gustavo Alatriste
- Release date: 1973
- Running time: 90 minute
- Country: Mexico
- Language: Spanish

Los privilegiados ("The Privileged") is a 1973 Mexican film directed by Gustavo Alatriste.

== Cast ==
- Ada Alzaga
