= Del otro lado del puente (1980 film) =

- Directed by: Gonzalo Martínez Ortega
- Written by: Gonzalo Martínez Ortega
- Produced by: Arnulfo Delgado
- Starring: Juan Gabriel; Valentin Trujillo; Lucha Villa; Julio Alemán; Estela Núñez; Narciso Busquets; Ana Laura Maldonado
- Cinematography: León Sánchez
- Edited by: Carlos Savage
- Music by: Juan Gabriel
- Release date: 17 April 1980 (Mexico)
- Running time: 97 minutes
- Country: Mexico
- Languages: Spanish; English

Del otro lado del puente (Spanish: "On the Other Side of the Bridge") is a 1980 Mexican musical drama film directed by Gonzalo Martínez Ortega and starring Juan Gabriel, Valentin Trujillo, Lucha Villa, Julio Alemán, Estela Núñez, Narciso Busquets and Ana Laura Maldonado. The story concerns a Mexican who is attracted by stories of unlimited opportunities in the United States, but once he arrives to the country faces a harsh reality, but is nonetheless determined to succeed.

It was one in a wave of Mexican films about the Chicano experience. It was the first in a trilogy of films directed by Martínez Ortega and starring Juan Gabriel, followed by the autobiographical duology El Noa Noa (1981) and Es mi vida (1982).

== Plot ==
The young Mexican Alberto (Juan Gabriel) lives in Los Angeles with the family of his older brother, Manny (Narciso Busquets) and studies at UCLA with the support of Professor Bob (Julio Alemán). Another young man, Jimmy Joe (Valentin Trujillo), who lives with his sister Estela (Ana Laura Maldonado), is encouraged to quit drug addiction at a youth rehabilitation center coordinated by Manny. Disillusioned with a gringa, Alberto meets Estela at a disco and becomes her boyfriend.

== Cast ==
- Juan Gabriel as Alberto Molina
- Valentin Trujillo as Jimmy Joe
- Lucha Villa as Mother
- Julio Alemán as Professor Bob
- Estela Núñez as Singer
- Narciso Busquets as Manuel Martínez "Manny"
- Ana Laura Maldonado as Estela (as Ana Laura)
- Billy Cardenas as Daniel Martínez "Danny"
- Barbara Kay as Doris
- Isaac Ruiz
- Beatriz Marín
- Roberto Rodríguez
- Mark Carlton
- Joe Kaniewski
- Rick Williamson as Joey (as Rick Miko)
- David Povall as TV Announcer (as David Estuardo)
- Joseanna Garza
- José Luis Rodríguez
- José Luis García Agraz
- Emma Serra
- Carlos Apodaca
- Ronnie Cárdenas
- Lucrecia Muñoz as Clinic Employee (uncredited)

== Production ==
It was filmed in 1978.

== Release ==
It was released on the Aragón 2, Colonial, Ermita, Marina, Soledad, Tlatelolco, Variedades, Vallejo 2000, Lago 2, and Premier cinemas on 17 April 1980, for six weeks.

== Reception ==
In Historia de la producción cinematográfica mexicana, 1977–1978, Marina Díaz López referred to the film by saying of Juan Gabriel that the "singer owed little of his great fame to his few jobs as a movie star".
