= Human (1976 film) =

- Directed by: Gustavo Alatriste
- Produced by: Gustavo Alatriste; Jorge Schwartz
- Release date: 10 July 1976 (Mexico)
- Running time: 85 minutes
- Country: Mexico
- Languages: English; Spanish

Human is a 1976 Mexican drama film. It was directed by Gustavo Alatriste. The film was made in England in 1971, but it wasn't until July 1976 that it was released.

== Cast ==
- April Ashley
- Mary Badeau
- Jack Ross
