= Carlos y José =

Mexican musical duo

- Origin: Reynosa, Tamaulipas, Mexico
- Genre: Norteño
- Years active: 1968–2008
- Label: Discos de Larga Vida
- Past members: Carlos Tierranegra Salazar; José Rodríguez

Carlos y José were a Mexican norteño duo consisting of the lead singer and accordionist Carlos Tierranegra Salazar and the harmony singer and bajo sexto player José Rodríguez. Tierranegra and Rodríguez met in 1963 and officially formed the Carlos y José duo in 1968. The duo made their first recording in 1969 and released their first hit, "La cosecha", after signing with the label Discos de Larga Vida in 1970. They released the songs "El chubasco" in 1981 and "Flor de capomo" in 1982, both of which broke sales records for the norteño genre. Carlos y José released more than 80 recordings together from their formation until 2008, when Rodríguez left the group in order to work on a solo musical project. During their career, the duo was among the most popular performers of norteño music.

== History ==
Carlos Tierranegra Salazar was born in General Terán, Nuevo León, in 1942; José Rodríguez was born in Los Ramones, Nuevo León, in 1950. The two met in 1963 and became friends; they spent the next five years performing together in bars in various towns. It was not until March 1968 that they officially formed the Carlos y José duo in Reynosa, Tamaulipas; they made their first recording the following year. Tierranegra served as the duo's lead singer and accordion player, while Rodriguez played the bajo sexto and provided backup vocals.

In 1970, Tierranegra and Rodríguez met the producer Servando Cano Rodríguez. Cano invited the duo to record under his label, Discos de Larga Vida; with the label, Carlos y José released their first hit, "La cosecha". The pair continued to release minor hits until 1981, when they released "El chubasco", which broke sales records in the norteño genre in both Mexico and the United States. They found further success with "Flor de capomo", which was released in 1982 and also broke sales records. Tierranegra and Rodríguez released more than 80 recordings together from their formation in 1968 until 2008, when Rodríguez left the group in order to work on a solo musical project. During their career, the duo was among the most popular performers of norteño music.

One year after Carlos y José split, Rodríguez died aged 59 on 29 September 2009 due to diabetes. Tierranegra died from cardiac arrest six years later on 15 November 2015. Shortly before Tierranegra's death, a film about the duo titled La vida de Carlos y José was produced and premiered in the United States. In 2015, Tierranegra and Rodríguez's grandsons, Juan Carlos Tierranegra and José Edwin Rodríguez, formed a norteño group called Carlos y José Jr., with the younger Tierranegra and Rodríguez playing the same instruments as had their grandfathers.

== Discography ==
- La Carta Que Te Mande (1968)
- Una Rosa de Castilla (1968)
- El Nuevo Albur de Amor (1968)
- Corridos Nortenos Con Carlos y Jose (1968)
- Corridos y Rancheras Con Carlos y Jose (1969)
- Lo Dulce y Lo Amargo (1970)
- El Casado (1970)
- Cuentame Tus Penas (1970)
- Tres Tumbas (1971)
- Las Mananitas a Mi Madre (1972)
- El Huerfanito (1972)
- Noches Eternas (1973)
- Busca Otro Amor (1973)
- Hermainia (1975)
- El Contrabandista (1975)
- Corridos Con Carlos y Jose (1975)
- Puro Nrote (1976)
- Desilusion (1977)
- Corridos de Caballos Famosos Con Carlos y Jose (1979)
- Que Chulos Ojos (1980)
