= Victorino (Las calles no se siembran) =

- Directed by: Gustavo Alatriste
- Release date: 1973
- Country: Mexico
- Language: Spanish

Victorino (Las calles no se siembran) ("Victorino (The Streets are Not Planted)") is a 1973 Mexican film. It was directed by Gustavo Alatriste.
