= Alicia Juárez =

- Born: Alicia López Palazuelos; 9 July 1950; La Barca, Jalisco, Mexico
- Died: 26 August 2017 (aged 68) Dolores Hidalgo, Guanajuato, Mexico
- Genres: Ranchera
- Occupations: Singer, actress
- Instrument: Vocals
- Years active: 1966–2017
- Labels: RCA Victor, Arcano, Musart

Alicia Juárez (born Alicia López Palazuelos; 9 July 1949 – 26 August 2017) was a Mexican singer and actress. She was also known by the nickname La musa de México ("The Muse of Mexico").

== Early life and career ==
She was born in La Barca, Jalisco, Mexico, the daughter of Francisco Javier López Hurtado and Celia Palazuelos. She was raised in Oxnard, California; most of her early years were spent in the United States and her singing career began there at age 16.

In Oxnard, she met José Alfredo Jiménez, who launched her to fame and with whom she would later marry. Juárez achieved international success in Colombia, Spain, South America, the United States and Europe. Juárez also appeared in nine films during her career, having a starring role in five of them, including playing a fictionalized version of herself in the 1980 film El charro del misterio.

== Personal life and death ==
Juárez met José Alfredo Jiménez at Oxnard and launched her to fame. They married in the United States, making her his last wife, and she was the inspiration for several of Jiménez's last songs, such as the song "Es muy niña".

Juárez died on 26 August 2017 at her home in Dolores Hidalgo, Guanajuato, Mexico, from a heart attack. Her ashes rest in Oxnard, the city where she lived for years and where her mother, brothers and two children reside.

== Discography ==
- José Alfredo y Alicia (RCA Victor, 1971) (with José Alfredo Jiménez)
- Mis últimas grabaciones con José Alfredo Jiménez (Arcano, 1975)

=== Compilation ===
- Alicia Juárez y José Alfredo Jiménez: Las coplas y todos sus éxitos (BMG Entertainment Mexico, 2004)
