= La grilla =

- Directed by: Gustavo Alatriste
- Release date: 1979
- Running time: 90 minute
- Country: Mexico
- Language: Spanish

La grilla ("The Grid") is a 1979 Mexican film. It was directed by Gustavo Alatriste.
