= La Pachanga (film) =

- Mexican theatrical release poster
- Directed by: José Estrada
- Screenplay by: Rogelio Agrasánchez; Ramón Obón
- Produced by: Rogelio Agrasánchez
- Starring: Julissa; Claudia Islas; Gregorio Casal; Sergio Jiménez; Patricia Rivera; Elsa Cárdenas; Carmelita González
- Cinematography: Rosalío Solano
- Edited by: Rafael Ceballos
- Music by: Armando Briseño; E. Davidson
- Release date: 1981
- Running time: 79 minutes
- Country: Mexico
- Language: Spanish

La Pachanga (The Party) is a 1981 Mexican comedy film, directed by José Estrada and starring Julissa, Claudia Islas, Gregorio Casal, Sergio Jiménez, Patricia Rivera, Elsa Cárdenas and Carmelita González.

The film received three Ariel Awards in 1983: Best Director, Best Editing and Best Art Direction.

== Plot ==
During a weekend in Mexico City, the inhabitants of an old apartment building held two separate ceremonies: a quinceañera and a wake. Neighbors are mixed between the two parties while love, sex, comedy and tragedy are combined.

== Main cast ==
- Julissa as Adela
- Claudia Islas as Carmen
- Gregorio Casal as Alejo
- Sergio Jiménez as Don Moshe Mostkoff
- Alejandro Ciangherotti as Vicente
- Patricia Rivera as Elodia
- Elsa Cárdenas as Laura
- Noé Murayama as Rey
- Carmelita González as Doña Eugenia

== Awards ==
=== Ariel Awards ===
The Ariel Awards are awarded annually by the Mexican Academy of Film Arts and Sciences in Mexico. La Pachanga received three awards out of eight nominations.

Year	Nominee / work	Award	Result
1983	José Estrada	Best Director	Won
1983	Noé Murayama	Best Actor	Nominated
1983	Sergio Jiménez	Best Actor	Nominated
1983	María Rojo	Best Actress	Nominated
1983	Alejandro Ciangherotti	Best Supporting Actor	Nominated
1983	José Morales Montáñez	Best Art Direction	Won
1983	Rosalío Solano	Best Cinematography	Nominated
1983	Rafael Ceballos	Best Editing	Won
