= El charro del misterio =

1980 Mexican film

- Directed by: José Juan Munguía
- Story by: Julio Tena
- Produced by: Arnulfo Delgado
- Starring: José Martín; Alicia Juárez; Julio Aldama; Alfredo Gutiérrez; Beatriz Adriana; Alfonso Munguía
- Cinematography: Adolfo Martínez Solares
- Edited by: José Juan Munguía
- Music by: Antonio Flores
- Release date: 19 June 1980 (Mexico)
- Running time: 80 minutes
- Country: Mexico
- Language: Spanish

El charro del misterio (English: "The Charro of Mystery" or "The Mysterious Horseman") is a 1980 Mexican drama mystery action musical film directed by José Juan Munguía and starring José Martín, Alicia Juárez, Julio Aldama, Alfredo Gutiérrez, Beatriz Adriana and Alfonso Munguía. It is based on a story by Julio Tena.

== Plot ==
Marcos (José Martín) is a widowed charro who lives with his children Francisco (Alfonso Munguía) and Graciela (Beatriz Adriana). Marcos explains to his children that in his time he was a famed gambler, but that he left it because of the suffering it caused to his late wife.

Marcos's success attracts the attention of Damián Chalena (Alfredo Gutiérrez) and his right-hand man, el Cortado (Julio Aldama). One day, Chalena challenges Marcos to a poker game. Marcos accepts, despite being aware that this will break the promise he made to his late wife, and beats him. However, furious from his loss, Chalena murders Marcos's children and employees during his absence, while some employees of Chalena injure Marcos after he discovers what happened and is presumed dead.

Afterwards, a mysterious masked charro, calling himself "El charro del misterio", appears to avenge those deaths. The charro stands as a defender of the underprivileged, while at the same time making a name for himself as a singer, beginning a relationship with the singer Alicia Juárez (played by real-life singer Alicia Juárez, playing a fictional version of herself), until he finally crosses paths with Chalena.

== Cast ==
- José Martín as Marcos / El charro del misterio
- Alicia Juárez as Alicia Juárez
- Julio Aldama as Cortado
- Alfredo Gutiérrez as Damián Chalena
- Beatriz Adriana as Graciela
- Alfonso Munguía as Francisco
- Armando Soto La Marina as Melquiades (as Armando Soto La Marina "El Chicote")
- Bruno Rey as Nabor Montes
- Jesús Gómez as Murdered man
- Ramón Vallarino
- Lauro Salazar
- Douglas Sandoval
- Norma Lazareno
- Chayito Valdez

== Release ==
It was released on the Carrusel, Orfeón, Santos Degollado, Vicente Guerrero, Mitla, Nacional, Emiliano Zapata, Pedro Infante and Elvira cinemas on 19 June 1980, for two weeks.

== Reception ==
¡Quiero ver sangre!: Historia ilustrada del cine de luchadores highlighted the musical acts of the film, saying that "las canciones lo son todo" ("the songs are everything").
