= Quisiera Ser Hombre =

- Poster of the movie
- Directed by: Abel Salazar
- Produced by: Carlos Amador
- Starring: Lucero; Guillermo Capetillo; Carlos Riquelme
- Distributed by: Telecine
- Release date: 1989
- Running time: 90 minutes
- Country: Mexico
- Language: Spanish

Quisiera ser hombre (in English: I Wish I Was A Man) is a Mexican motion picture released in 1989. Some people think this film helped indirectly to think about homosexuality and travestism in teenagers.

== Synopsis ==
Manuela (Lucerito) has a lot of difficulties to get work as a fashion designer, since the world of "haute couture" is preferred by men. She decides to change her appearance in order to have luck, so Manuela becomes Manuelito. Immediately find a job as an assistant of Miguel (Guillermo Capetillo), who is also a designer. Miguel offers to share his department, and Manuelito agrees because she/he doesn't have a place to live. This raises a number of funny situations, especially when Miguel is alarmed to know that he is falling in love with his "male friend"..

== Cast ==
- Lucerito as Manuela/Manuel
- Guillermo Capetillo as Miguel
- Erika Magnus as Mariana
- Carlos Riquelme as Doctor
- Amparo Arozamena as Chona
