= Black Wind (film) =

1964 film

- Directed by: Servando González
- Written by: Rafael García Travesi; Servando González; Nino Martini
- Produced by: César Santos Galindo
- Starring: David Reynoso
- Release date: 1964
- Running time: 127 minutes
- Country: Mexico
- Language: Spanish

Black Wind (Spanish: Viento negro) is a 1964 Mexican drama film directed by Servando González. It was screened at the San Francisco Film Festival and the Melbourne International Film Festival. The film was selected as the Mexican entry for the Best Foreign Language Film at the 39th Academy Awards, but was not accepted as a nominee.

== Cast ==
- David Reynoso as Manuel Iglesias
- José Elías Moreno as Lorenzo Montes
- Eleazar García as Picuy
- Enrique Aguilar as Ingeniero Antonio López
- Roberto Cobo as Ingeniero Carlos Jiménez
- Rodolfo Landa as Ingeniero Fernández
- Enrique Lizalde as Jorge Iglesias
- Fernando Luján as Ingeniero Julio
- Jorge Martínez de Hoyos as Ulalio
- Marianela Peña as La Venada
- Miguel Suárez as Funcionario
- José Torvay as Nabor Camargo
- Aarón Hernán

== See also ==
- List of submissions to the 39th Academy Awards for Best Foreign Language Film
- List of Mexican submissions for the Academy Award for Best Foreign Language Film
