= Demonoid (film) =

- Theatrical release poster
- Directed by: Alfredo Zacarías
- Written by: David Lee Fein; F. Amos Powell; Alfredo Zacarías
- Produced by: Alfredo Zacarías; Miguel Zacarías
- Starring: Samantha Eggar; Stuart Whitman; Roy Jenson; Lew Saunders; Narciso Busquets
- Cinematography: Alex Phillips Jr.
- Edited by: Sandy Nervig
- Music by: Richard Gillis
- Production company: Panorama Films
- Distributed by: American Panorama (U.S.)
- Release dates: February 27, 1981 (West Germany); November 12, 1981 (Mexico)
- Running time: 78 minutes
- Country: Mexico
- Language: English

Demonoid (Spanish: Macabra: La mano del diablo, lit. 'Macabra: Hand of the Devil', also known as Demonoid: Messenger of Death), is a 1981 English-language Mexican supernatural horror film co-written, produced, and directed by Alfredo Zacarías. It stars Samantha Eggar, Stuart Whitman, Roy Jenson, Lew Saunders and Narciso Busquets. The plot centres on a group of explorers, who find a mysterious hand in Guanajuato that causes madness and death to whoever owns it.

The film was released theatrically in the U.S. in June 1981 to predominantly negative reviews; however, over the years, it has achieved cult status.

== Plot ==
300 years ago, in a mine located in Guanajuato, Mexico. A satanic cult built a temple where they sacrificed humans to the Devil by cutting off the left hand of their victims. In the present day, couple Mark and Jennifer Baines explore the temple where they find a small casket containing a severed hand which they take back to their hotel room. Later that night Mark opens the casket and is attacked and possessed by the hand. Fleeing to Las Vegas, he wins a fortune by gambling. Hating being possessed, Mark attempts to sever his left hand but is burned to death by his possessed hand. Mark's body is shipped to Los Angeles for burial. Jennifer arrives at Father Cunningham's church where her husband is to be buried and warns the priest that her husband might still be possessed and requests that an autopsy be performed on the body.

As they talk on the matter, Mark's severely charred corpse reanimates and bursts from his coffin and escapes. When Police Sergeant Leo Matson arrives to investigate the turn of events he is attacked by Mark who then severs his left hand by slamming it in a door, after which Mark falls dead and the hand immediately possesses Matson. Disturbed by his new left hand, Matson arrests Jennifer under false pretences and heads to a plastic surgery office. Matson forces plastic surgeon Dr. Julian Rivkin to sever the hand at gunpoint after which the hand shoots a nurse with Matson's discarded handgun, and murders Matson by brutally ripping the Sergeant's face off. The hand then possesses Rivken who severs his hand on a train track. Later, the hand finds and corners Jennifer at her motel and attempts to possess her as well but is saved by Father Cunningham and they both flee to the church. Father Cunningham leaves and is asked to administer last rites to a car accident victim who no longer has a left hand. Returning to the church and Jennifer, the two flee the hand which has also made its way to the church. There the hand cuts the power and phone lines and stalks the group, the hand manages to possess Cunningham who then attacks Jennifer with a knife. However he is eventually able to overcome the hand's influence and stabs his own hand and has Jennifer burn his hand off with a blowtorch and scatter the hands ashes in the harbor. Later, Jennifer is back home, but the hand, which somehow survived, attacks and kills her.

== Cast ==
- Samantha Eggar as Jennifer Baines
- Stuart Whitman as Father Cunningham
- Roy Jenson as Mark Baines
- Lew Saunders as Sergeant Leo Matson
- Narciso Busquets as Dr. Julian Rivkin
- Erika Carlsson as Nurse Morgan / Opening Sacrifice Victim
- José Chávez Trowe as Pepe
- Haji as Angela
- Ted White as Frankie
- George Soviak as Sgt. Needham

== Production ==
Demonoid was directed by Mexican filmmaker Alfredo Zacarías, who also wrote the film's story. Principal photography began in Mexico on October 22, 1979, with approximately four weeks spent filming in Mexico City and Guanajuato. Production then moved to the United States, where additional scenes were filmed in Los Angeles, Oxnard, and Las Vegas before filming officially wrapped on December 19, 1979.

== Release ==
Demonoid was released theatrically in the United States in June 1981.

=== Home media ===
Demonoid was released on VHS by Media Home Entertainment on July 15, 1988. It was released for the first time on DVD by Laguna Films on September 28, 2005. It was later released on DVD and Blu-ray combo pack by Vinegar Syndrome on February 23, 2016.

== Reception ==
Demonoid received generally negative reviews from critics.

Leonard Maltin gave the film 1.5 out of 4 stars, criticizing the script, direction, and special effects as "getting in the way of any suspense".

AllMovie gave the film 1.5/5, calling it "inept" and stating that, "Even in its best moments, however, this film can only approximate a particularly weak episode of Fantasy Island".

TV Guide panned the film, awarding it 1.5 out of 5 stars, calling it "awful" and "ridiculous", while criticizing the film's acting and plot.

Caitlin Huggins from HorrorNews.net gave the film a negative review, criticizing its plot as 'confusing and hurried', as well as its dumb and unlikable characters.

Dan Budnik from The Bleeding Skull called it "a rather tedious demon possession movie with a great title and lots of killer hands running around".

Decades later, the film was discussed on The Video Archives Podcast with Quentin Tarantino and Roger Avary, who gave it a positive review.

== See also ==
- The Beast with Five Fingers
- The Crawling Hand
- The Hand (1981 film)
