= Entre violetas =

- Directed by: Gustavo Alatriste
- Release date: 1973
- Country: Mexico
- Language: Spanish

Entre violetas ("Among Violets") is a 1973 Mexican film. It was directed by Gustavo Alatriste.
