= El buscabullas =

1976 film

- Directed by: Raúl de Anda, Jr.
- Screenplay by: Ramón Obón
- Story by: Raúl de Anda
- Produced by: Antonio de Anda
- Starring: Rodolfo de Anda; Héctor Suárez; Silvia Manríquez
- Cinematography: Raúl Domínguez
- Edited by: Sergio Soto
- Music by: Ricardo Carrión
- Production company: Estudios América
- Distributed by: Cine Visión
- Release date: May 13, 1976 (Mexico)
- Running time: 88 minutes
- Country: Mexico
- Language: Spanish

El buscabullas (Brawlers) is a 1976 Mexican western drama film directed by Raúl de Anda, Jr. and starring Rodolfo de Anda, Héctor Suárez, and Silvia Manríquez. It was filmed in Eastmancolor using the Mexiscope process.

== Cast ==
- Rodolfo de Anda as Ray
- Héctor Suárez as Pancho
- Silvia Manríquez as Rosita
- Bruno Rey as Ambrosio
- Jorge Russek as Ronald McCree
- Rebeca Iturbide as Diana McCree
- Rodolfo de Anda jr. as Tommy
- Carlos López Moctezuma as Doctor William Parker
- Ricardo Carrión as Jim
- Yolanda Liévana as Claudine
- José L. Murillo as Simpson
- Gerardo Zepeda as Bartender
- Hernando Name as Sheriff

== Production ==
The exterior scenes of El buscabullas were shot in the state of Durango at locations such as Cañón de las Huertas, Lerdo de Tejada, el Saltillo, San Vicente de Chupaderos, and the Peña del Águila Dam from May 17 to May 31, 1974. The interior scenes were shot in sound stages at Estudios América between May 6 to June 22, 1974. The film was also known as Su muerte, unos dólares.

== Release ==
The film premiered in Mexico City at the Cine Maríscala theater for four weeks.
