= Aquel famoso Remington =

- Directed by: Gustavo Alatriste
- Starring: Antonio Medellín
- Release date: 1982
- Country: Mexico
- Language: Spanish

Aquel famoso Remington (English: That Famous Remington) is a 1982 Mexican film. It was directed by Gustavo Alatriste.

The film was based on the life of Mexican gunslinger Rodolfo Álvarez del Castillo y Rojas, a man from Los Altos de Jalisco, with the nickname "El Remington", who lived in Guadalajara, and was shot by several individuals around 9:45 p.m. on Thursday, 10 December 1936, during a festival held at the garden located in front of the Sanctuary of Guadalupe, in Guadalajara, precisely at the northwest corner of the aforementioned garden, on Pedro Loza and Juan Álvarez streets. "El Remington" died a few days after he was shot.
