= La combi asesina =

- Directed by: Gustavo Alatriste
- Release date: 1982
- Running time: 90 minute
- Country: Mexico
- Language: Spanish

La combi asesina ("The Killer Combination") is a 1982 Mexican film. It was directed by Gustavo Alatriste.
