= Lew Saunders =

American film and television actor

- Born: Lewis Saunders; October 6
- Occupations: Film and television actor
- Years active: 1975–1998

Lewis Saunders (born October 6) is an American film and television actor. He is known for playing Officer Gene Fritz in 28 episodes of the American crime drama television series CHiPs from 1977 to 1979.

Saunders played for the Atlanta Falcons football team. He began his acting career in 1975, when he appeared in the police procedural television series Bronk. Saunders guest-starred in television programs including The A-Team, L.A. Law, Riptide, Trapper John, M.D., Hunter, Hardcastle and McCormick, Murder, She Wrote, Quincy, M.E., Jake and the Fatman, Dynasty and Matt Houston. He also appeared in the films Cocktail, Terror Among Us and Demonoid (as Sergeant Leo Matson). From 1977 to 1979 Saunders played Officer Gene Fritz in the first two seasons, and one episode of the third, in the NBC crime drama series CHiPs. He retired in 1998, last appearing in the drama television film The Rat Pack, playing Big John.
