= Professor Zovek =

Mexican escape artist

- Born: 13 April 1940; Torreón, Mexico
- Died: 10 March 1972 (aged 31); Cuautitlan, Mexico
- Occupation: Escape artist

Professor Zovek (Spanish: Profesor Zovek) was a Mexican escape artist. He was born Francisco Xavier Chapa del Bosque on 13 April 1940 in Torreón, and died on 10 March 1972.

He appeared in two films, The Incredible Professor Zovek ("El increíble Profesor Zovek", 1972), and Blue Demon and Zovek in the Invasion of the Dead ("Blue Demon y Zovek en la invasión de los muertos", 1973, released posthumously).

He died falling from a helicopter in a stunt gone wrong.

In the 2018 film Roma he was portrayed by Latin Lover.
