= En la cuerda del hambre =

- Directed by: Gustavo Alatriste
- Release date: 1979
- Running time: 90 minute
- Country: Mexico
- Language: Spanish

En la cuerda del hambre ("On the Rope of Hunger") is a 1979 Mexican film. It was directed by Gustavo Alatriste.
