= Servando González =

Mexican film director

- Born: Servando Gonzalez Hernandez; 15 May 1923; Veracruz, Mexico
- Died: 5 October 2008 (aged 85); Mexico City, Mexico
- Occupation: Film director
- Years active: 1960–1987

Servando González Hernández (15 May 1923 – 5 October 2008) was a Mexican film director.

== Biography ==
Servando González started as an apprentice (gofer) at Estudios Clasa, a Mexican film studio. He climbed up the ladder of the movie industry and became head of the film laboratory of Estudios Churubusco.

In 1968, as chief documentary filmmaker for the government of Mexico, he was asked to set up cameras on the Mexico City plaza, and had not anticipated he was about to film the Tlatelolco massacre. The films were taken from him right after the event and disappeared.

Servando González was the winner of 25 awards with Yanco and participated as co-star in dozens of films of the Mexican Golden Age with the actor Alberto Ramírez. He was characterized as a talented actor, director, writer and film producer, according to his official biographer Wilbert Alonzo-Cabrera, former vice president of Association of Entertainment JournalistD (ACE), of New York.

He died in Mexico City on 5 October 2008, at the age of 85.

== Selected filmography ==
- 1961: Yanco
- 1965: Black Wind (Viento Negro)
- 1965: The Fool Killer, starring Anthony Perkins and Dana Elcar
- 1968: The Scapular (El escapulario)
- 1977: The Chosen One (El Elegido)
- 1988: The Last Tunnel (supposedly the most expensive movie made in Mexico in the 1980s)
