= El sátiro =

- Directed by: Raúl Zenteno
- Screenplay by: Raúl Zenteno
- Story by: Mauricio Serral; Raúl Zenteno
- Starring: Mauricio Garcés; Patricia Rivera; Alberto Rojas
- Cinematography: Miguel Araña
- Edited by: Alfredo Rosas Priego
- Music by: Gustavo César Carrión
- Production company: Televicine
- Distributed by: Televicine
- Release date: 1980 (Mexico)
- Running time: 95 minutes
- Country: Mexico
- Language: Spanish

El sátiro (in English: "The Satyr") is a 1980 Mexican comedy film directed by Raúl Zenteno and starring Mauricio Garcés, Patricia Rivera, and Alberto Rojas.

== Plot ==
A Don Juan (Mauricio Garcés), a successful businessman in the lingerie business but fed up with having to resort to various costumes, wishes to rekindle his charm and maintain his reputation as a middle-aged womanizer with the help of a friend and apartment neighbor (Alberto Rojas). Things get complicated when he seems to find true love in the daughter of a friend (Patricia Rivera), a girl much younger than him.

== Cast ==
- Mauricio Garcés
- Mónica Prado
- Gloria Mayo
- Isaura Espinoza
- Patricia Rivera
- Alicia Encinas
- Felicia Mercado
- Jacaranda Morel
- Tere Cornejo
- Alberto Rojas (as Alberto Rojas "El Caballo")
- Víctor Manuel Castro (as Víctor Manuel "Guero" Castro)
- Carlos Riquelme
- Roberto G. Rivera
- Fernando Yapur
- Pancho Müller (as Francisco Mueller)
- Carlos Bravo y Fernández (as Carl-Hillos)

== Analysis ==
Gustavo García and José Felipe Coria in Nuevo cine mexicano described the film as a "self-critical revision" and "bitter self-criticism" in reference to the roles of romantic leading man played by Mauricio Garcés throughout his career. In Miradas disidentes: géneros y sexo en la historia del arte, Alberto Dallal noted that the fact that Garcés's character "ends up in love with a girl who is smarter, in matters of seduction, than him" was a theme similar to that of a previous Garcés film, Don Juan 67 (1966). In Del quinto poder al séptimo arte: la producción fílmica de Televisa, Raúl Miranda López cited the film as one among a group of films that at the time "raised [...] the issue of amusing sexual impotence" (describing Garcés as a "stubborn flirter"), describing it as a "condition [that was] returning to do its thing in the macho Mexican cinema."
