= México 2000 =

- Directed by: Rogelio A. González
- Written by: Chucho Salinas; Adolfo Torres Portillo
- Produced by: Corporación Nacional Cinematográfica
- Starring: Chucho Salinas; Héctor Lechuga; Rojo Grau; Elizabeth Aguilar; Miguel Gurza
- Cinematography: Gabriel Figueroa
- Edited by: Carlos Savage
- Release date: 3 February 1983
- Running time: 95 minutes
- Country: Mexico
- Language: Spanish

México 2000 is a 1983 Mexican science fiction comedy film directed by Rogelio A. González.

== Plot ==
The film is set in a utopic Mexico City in the year 2000. It consists of a series of sarcastic stories in which the characters remember what the problems facing the country were during the 1980s, such as education, family, security, transportation and politics. In the film all the inhabitants are unemployed, there are no homeless people, the is no poverty, three languages are spoken, primary agricultural products are exported all over the world, the Americans emigrate to Mexico, and foreigners travel to study there. Likewise, the Mexican culture has spread around the world; it is the world's greatest cultural power. In the film, Mexicans are enthusiastic, disciplined, studious people; there is no racism or social inequality, nor is there corruption, pollution or unemployment.

== Cast ==
- Chucho Salinas
- Héctor Lechuga
- Rojo Grau
- Elizabeth Aguilar
- Miguel Gurza
- Humberto Gurza
- Jacqueline Hivet
- Dora Elsa Olea
- Tina Romero
- Lourdes Salinas
- Arturo Adonay
- Paco Moraita
