= Blue Demon and Zovek in the Invasion of the Dead =

- Directed by: René Cardona
- Written by: René Cardona
- Produced by: Carlos Rosas Gallastegui
- Starring: Alejandro Moreno and Professor Zovek
- Cinematography: José Ortiz Ramos
- Edited by: Alfredo Rosas Priego
- Music by: Raúl Lavista
- Production companies: Azteca Films; Producciones Nova; Productora Fílmica Real
- Release date: 1973
- Running time: 85 minutes
- Country: Mexico
- Language: Spanish

Blue Demon and Zovek in the Invasion of the Dead (Spanish: Blue Demon y Zovek en la invasión de los muertos: sometimes called simply La Invasión de Los Muertos) is a 1973 Mexican horror film directed by René Cardona, starring Blue Demon (Alejandro Muñoz Moreno) and Professor Zovek (Francisco Xavier Chapa del Bosque).

Zovek died during production, and wrestler Blue Demon was brought in to bring the film up to feature length.

== Plot ==
Professor Bruno Volpi discovers some strange markings on a cliff. Professor Zovek deciphers them to warn of impending catastrophe. Wrestler Blue Demon and Zovek battle zombies.

== Cast ==
- Blue Demon as himself
- Professor Zovek as himself
- Christa Linder as Erika
- Raúl Ramírez as Professor Bruno Volpi

== Reception ==
A sharp contrast has been noted between the Zovek and the Blue Demon sections, the first deemed of fairly good quality and the latter very much less so.
