= Yanco (film) =

- Directed by: Servando González
- Written by: Servando González
- Produced by: Jesús Marín
- Starring: Ricardo Ancona; Jesús Medina; María Bustamante
- Cinematography: Alex Phillips
- Release date: 1961
- Running time: 91 minutes
- Country: Mexico
- Languages: Náhuatl, Spanish

Yanco is a 1961 Mexican drama film directed by Servando González. It is based on Janko Muzykant, a 1879 short story written by Henryk Sienkiewicz.

== Plot ==
Juanito is a boy who lives in the town of Mixquic, in rural Mexico city surroundings. Despite his young age, he is more interested in nature, caring for small animals, and his own musings; he has a special affinity for sounds and music, and hence, seems to have a case of hypersensitivity to noises, preferring to be alone; this attitude gains him the teasing from his peers who consider him an outcast.

He meets an old deaf and mute violinist who plays in the town in exchange for money and lives alone; fascinated by the music, Juanito forms a close bond with the old man who takes the boy under his wing and teaches him how to play the violin. Juanito feels finally accepted and with some purpose for his life, but tragedy strikes him: his mother becomes sick and he has to tend her, abandoning his evening classes with the old man. Eventually, Juanito's mother recovers, but the old man dies, leaving Juanito feeling alone again. The possessions of the old teacher, including his violin, that has YANCO engraved on the back, end in the hands of a Spanish man who owns the only general store and cantina in the town.

Juanito gets a job as a helper in the shop to be near the violin, which he takes every night to a nearby islet to play; the melancholic and strange music haunts the town's population, who think the music is an otherworldly manifestation; as days go by, the haunting music and some events such as the spread of diseases that kill both people and animals seem to be correlated by the townsfolk, and by consequence, they conclude Juanito is to blame.

Incensed by the shopkeeper, and right in the midst of a religious celebration (Day of the Dead), a mob armed with torches and clubs looks for Juanito, who is playing the violin; in his ecstatic state, the small piece of land he is standing on gets swept by a powerful current, taking him to a whirlpool in the middle of the canals. When the mob arrives, is too late, since the whirlpool has engulfed Juanito along with Yanco, the violin, thus saving him from the angry mob and from a world that do not understands him.

== Cast ==
- Ricardo Ancona – Juanito
- Jesús Medina – Old Violin Teacher
- María Bustamante – María

== Production ==
The film was shot in the town of Mixquic, then a rural area of Mexico City. The plot emphasizes more the visual aspects of the narrative than the actual dialogue, which has lines in both Spanish and Nahuatl. The visual narrative grabs elements from soviet-era films, relying on the main photography and the characters' expressions instead of developing complex or poetic spoken dialogues. The film had a budget of $35,000MXN, a small allowance for a film even for 1961 standards; however, it was screened during around 22 weeks and participated in several film festivals around the world.

== Awards ==
Yanco won the Special Jury Prize Award at Valladolid International Film Festival in 1962
