= Toña, nacida virgen (Del oficio) =

- Directed by: Gustavo Alatriste
- Release date: 1982
- Country: Mexico
- Language: Spanish

Toña, nacida virgen (Del oficio) ("Toña, Born a Virgin (The Office)") is a 1982 Mexican film. It was directed by Gustavo Alatriste.
