= Miguel Ángel Rodríguez (Mexican actor) =

Mexican actor

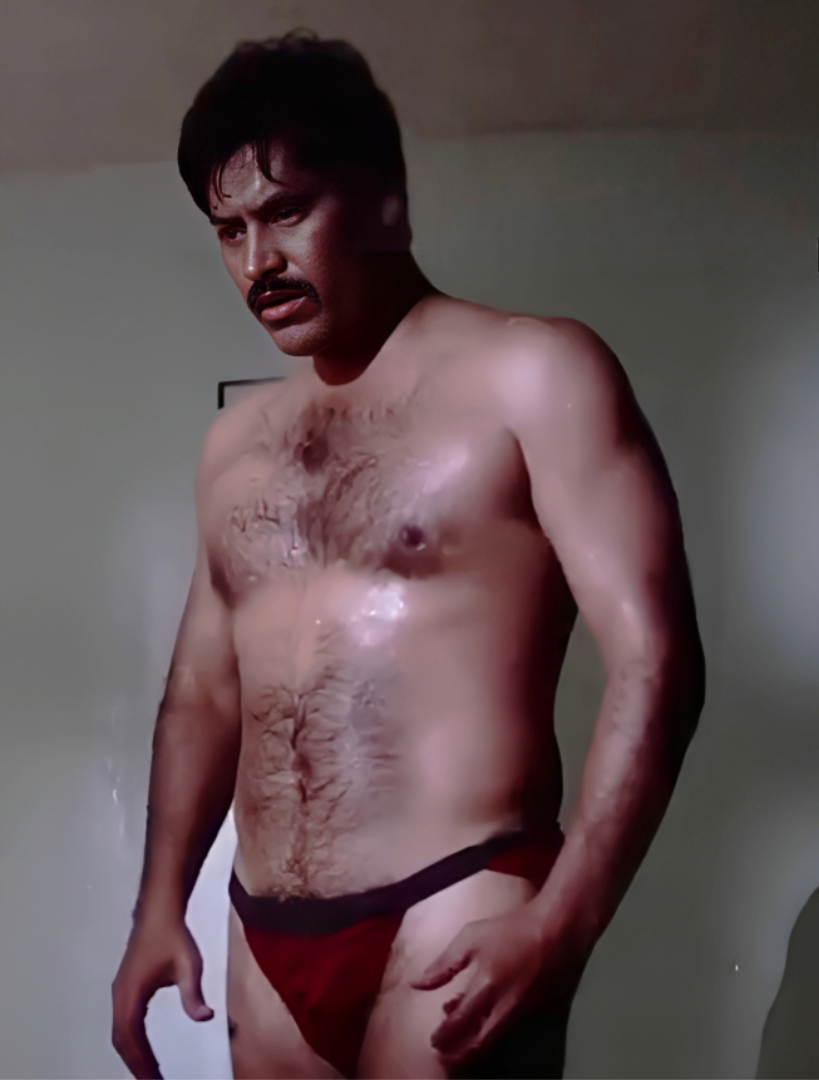
- Miguel Ángel Rodríguez in 1980
- Born: Actor, director 10 November 1960 (age 65); Los Reyes, Michoacán, Mexico
- Years active: 1977 - present

Miguel Ángel Rodríguez (born 10 November 1960) is a Mexican born actor and director with more than 200 credits. Among his work, he has acted in Rosalinda and Bad Cop with Damian Chapa.

== Career ==
=== 1970s to 1990s ===
One of his earliest roles was in the 1977 Rafael Villaseñor Kuri directed film, Mil caminos tiene la muerte. After that he acted with René Cardona and Roberto Cañedo in Cronica roja, released in 1978/1979. Also around the time, he appeared in Benjamín Argumedo el rebelde, which was directed by Mario Hernández. Around 1989 / 1990, he played the part of Det. Mike Silva in the Alfredo Zacarías directed Crime of Crimes, which also starred David Carradine. He played the part of Javier Pérez in the 1999 film Rosalinda.

=== 2000s ===
He played a gangster in the Damian Chapa directed film Bad Cop, which was released in 2009. He recently appeared in the 2016 TV series Eva La Trailera.
