= Chucho Salinas =

Mexican actor and comedian (1928–2001)

- Born: Jesús Salinas Ortega; 12 February 1928; Mexico City, Mexico
- Died: 8 November 2001 (aged 73)
- Occupations: Actor and comedian
- Years active: 1960s–2001

Jesús Salinas Ortega, better known as his stage name Chucho Salinas (12 February 1928 – 8 November 2001), was a Mexican film and television actor and comedian. Credits in film include Nacidos para cantar (1965) and México 2000 (1983).

Salinas died in a traffic collision on 8 November 2001.
