= En la trampa =

- Written by: Luis Alcoriza
- Release date: 1979
- Country: Mexico
- Language: Spanish

En la trampa ("In the Trap") is a 1979 Mexican film. It was written by Luis Alcoriza.
