= The Last Tunnel (1987 film) =

1987 film

- Directed by: Servando González
- Written by: Servando González; Carlos Enrique Taboada; Jesús Marín
- Starring: David Reynoso
- Release date: 24 December 1987
- Running time: 110 minutes
- Country: Mexico
- Languages: Spanish; Rarámuri

The Last Tunnel (Spanish: El último túnel) is a 1987 Mexican drama film directed by Servando González. The film was selected as the Mexican entry for the Best Foreign Language Film at the 61st Academy Awards, but was not accepted as a nominee.

== Plot summary ==
Manuel Iglesias, an engineer, is assigned to oversee the expansion of the railway line from the state of Chihuahua to the Pacific. He sends his adopted son, Julián, who is reluctant to take part in the project. Once there, Julián seduces Andarica, the daughter of the Tarahumara governor, and leaves her pregnant. Although he refuses to marry her, Manuel Iglesias promises the governor that the marriage will happen.

== Cast ==
- David Reynoso as Manuel Iglesias 'El Mayor'
- Gerardo Zepeda as Pequeño
- Enrique Lucero as Juan Penagos
- Ignacio Guadalupe as Julián
- Holda Ramírez as Anarica
- Pablo Ortega as Oromi
- Claudio Sorel as Beltrán

== See also ==
- List of submissions to the 61st Academy Awards for Best Foreign Language Film
- List of Mexican submissions for the Academy Award for Best Foreign Language Film
