= Héctor Lechuga =

Mexican actor (1927–2017)

- Born: 18 April 1927; Orizaba, Veracruz, Mexico
- Died: 13 July 2017 (aged 90); Xalapa, Veracruz, Mexico
- Occupation(s): Actor, comedian, political commentator

Héctor Lechuga (18 April 1927 – 13 July 2017) was a Mexican actor, comedian, political commentator, and radio personality.

Lechuga died of a heart attack after suffering from Alzheimer's disease at his home in Mexico City, at the age of 90.

== Filmography ==
- Buenas Noches Año Nuevo (1964)
- El Dengue del Amor (1965)
- La Muerte es Puntual (1964)
- Detectives O Ladrones (1966)
- Réquiem por un Canalla (1967)
- La Muerte a Seis Litros (1962)
- El Tigre Negro (1965)
- Bang Bang y al Hoyo (1971)
- Las Fuerzas Vivas (1975)
- La Disputa (1969)
- México 2000 (1983)
- Rapiña (1982)
