= Historia de una mujer escandalosa =

- Directed by: Gustavo Alatriste
- Release date: 1982
- Country: Mexico
- Language: Spanish

Historia de una mujer escandalosa ("Story of a Scandalous Woman") is a 1982 Mexican film. It was directed by Gustavo Alatriste.
