= David Reynoso =

Mexican actor

- Born: David Reynoso Flores; 29 January 1926; Aguascalientes, Mexico
- Died: 9 June 1994 (aged 68); Mexico City, Mexico
- Occupation: Actor
- Years active: 1955–1994

David Reynoso Flores (29 January 1926 – 9 June 1994) was a Mexican actor. He appeared in more than 170 films and television shows between 1955 and 1994. He was also a federal deputy from 1979 to 1982, representing the Federal District's seventh district for the Institutional Revolutionary Party (PRI).

He died from cancer in 1994.

== Selected filmography ==
- Ash Wednesday (1958)
- Sonatas (1959)
- The White Renegade (1960)
- Ánimas Trujano (1962)
- Black Wind (1965)
- Alma de mi alma (1965)
- Rage (1966)
- Blue Demon contra las diabólicas (1967)
- Seis Días para Morir (La Rabia) (1967)
- El muro del silencio (1974)
- The House in the South (1975)
- Stick (film) (1985)
- The Last Tunnel (1988)
