= The House of Bernarda Alba (1982 film) =

- Directed by: Gustavo Alatriste
- Release date: April 2, 1982
- Running time: 100 minute
- Country: Mexico
- Language: Spanish

The House of Bernarda Alba is a 1982 Mexican film directed by Gustavo Alatriste.
