= Valentín Trujillo (actor) =

Mexican actor (1951–2006)

- Born: Valentín Trujillo Gazcón; March 28, 1951; Atotonilco, Jalisco, Mexico
- Died: May 4, 2006 (aged 55); Mexico City, Mexico
- Education: UNAM
- Occupation: Actor
- Years active: 1958–2006

Rafael Valentín Trujillo Gazcón (28 March 1951 – 4 May 2006) was a Mexican actor, writer and director. His career spanned 48 years, where he appeared in over 140 films and directed 20 films.

== Early life ==
Trujillo was born on 28 March 1951, in a show business family as his grandfather was film producer Valentín Gazcón and his uncle was director Gilberto Gazcón. He made his film debut as an infant.

Trujillo studied law at Universidad Nacional Autónoma de México (UNAM), but chose to become an actor instead after obtaining his degree.

== Career ==
=== Early career ===
Trujillo made his acting debut at the age of seven in the film El Gran Pillo (1958). As a teen he acted in the Columbia Pictures release Rage (1966) alongside Glenn Ford and Stella Stevens.

=== Stardom ===
Beginning in the early 1970s, Trujillo was cast often as the male lead. The film Las figuras de arena (1970) directed by Roberto Gavaldón established him as a leading man. He worked steadily as the leading man in action films over the next decade, completing over 30 films between 1970 and 1979.

In addition to action films, Trujillo expanded his range in a number of films that incorporated commentary about modern social issues and politics in Mexico. The film Perro Callejero (1980) won a Silver Goddess for Best Picture and Trujillo, who portrayed the lead drunken character, was awarded Best Actor by Premios ACE.

=== Later career and death ===
Trujillo met actress Lucía Méndez on the set of a film in 1972 and they dated for three years, though he ended the relationship after she refused to marry him. Trujillo married another actress, Patricia María, and they had three children: Valentín Jr., Patricia and Rodrigo. He later married Scarlett Alvarado, with whom he had a son. Valentín Jr. went on to become a film director and producer.

Beginning in the 1980s, Trujillo began writing and directing his films. He made his directorial debut with the 1986 release of Ratas de la ciudad. He released several popular action films and was soon the top box office draw in Mexico.

Trujillo was nominated for several Ariel Awards in the 1980s, including Best Supporting Actor for El Ansia de Matar (1987) and Best Story and Screenplay for Violación (1989). The latter also was the first film to co-star his son, Valentin Trujillo Jr. Together they co-starred in close to 20 films together before Trujillo's untimely death.

Trujillo died in his sleep from a heart attack on 4 May 2006; he was 55 years old.

== Actor ==
- 2007: Así me lo conto el abuelo (video)
- 2000: 2000 Entre perico y perico (video)
- 1999: El comerciante (video)
- 1999: Horas amargas
- 1999: La danza del venado
- 1999: Las dos hectareas (video)
- 1999: Mi oficio es ser asaltante (video)
- 1999: Mis animales y yo
- 1999: Polícia de narcóticos 2
- 1998: Cuatro meses de libertad Director de Cine
- 1998: Derrumbe mortal
- 1998: El mochaorejas
- 1998: Fiera salvaje (video)
- 1998: Juramento cumplido (video)
- 1998: La 4X4
- 1998: La Dinastia de los Quintero (video)
- 1998: Lluvia de plomo (video)
- 1998: Masacre en Ensenada (video)
- 1998: Mi último contrabando (video)
- 1998: Sucedió en el aguaje
- 1998: Un pasado violento (video)
- 1997: Amor en tiempos de coca
- 1997: Caceria de judiciales
- 1997: Caminero Don Atenor
- 1997: Con fuego en la sangre (video)
- 1997: Destino traidor (video)
- 1997: El gallo galindo
- 1997: El manco
- 1997: Entre cartas y gallos (video)
- 1997: Pesadilla infernal
- 1997: Ratas de barrio
- 1997: Secuestradores
- 1997: Traición en la hacienda (video)
- 1997: Un alacran y un gallo (video)
- 1997: Violencia policiaca
- 1996: Balneario Nacional (video)
- 1996: Destino final
- 1996: El chacal del puerto (video)
- 1996: El maldito (video)
- 1996: El rigór de la ley
- 1996: Intriga en el paraíso Fernando
- 1996: Juventud en drogas
- 1996: Operación masacre (video)
- 1996: Sangre salvaje (video)
- 1996: Trampa para un inocente (video)
- 1996: Víctimas de la ambición Ing. Fernando Cortés
- 1996: Violencia perversa (video)
- 1995: Al son de la metralleta German Funes
- 1995: Atrapados Perro
- 1995: Pistoleros anonimos (video)
- 1995: Rafaga de cuerno de chivo (video)
- 1995: Tiempo de muerte 2 Robles
- 1995: Violencia en la obscuridad
- 1995: Violencia en la oscuridad
- 1995: Violencia en la sierra Valente Rojas
- 1994: Desesperación criminal (video)
- 1994: Imposible de matar
- 1994: Juego violento (video)
- 1994: Tiempo de muerte (video)
- 1993: Burlando la ley Jorge
- 1993: Hombres de acero
- 1992: Secuestro de un periodista
- 1992: Venganza
- 1991: La verdadera historia de Barman y Droguin El Ejecutor
- 1991: Un hombre despiadado
- 1990: El último escape Revendedor
- 1990: Carrera contra la muerte
- 1990: Cargando con el tiezo
- 1990: Jefe policiaco
- 1989: Violación
- 1989: Atrapado
- 1988: Mi fantasma y yo
- 1988: En peligro de muerte
- 1988: A sangre y fuego
- 1987: Cacería humana
- 1987: Ansia de matar
- 1987: La pandilla infernal Lorenzo Rojas
- 1987: Yo el ejecutor
- 1987: Dias de matanza
- 1986: Policía de narcóticos Julian Carrera
- 1986: El cafre
- 1986: Ratas de la ciudad Pedro
- 1986: Un hombre violento Julian Carrera
- 1985: Juana Iris (TV series) Bernardo (1985)
- 1984: Perros salvajes
- 1983: Dos de abajo
- 1983: Las modelos de desnudos
- 1983: Fieras en brama
- 1983: Demon Huntere Herrero
- 1982: El Bronco
- 1981: Perro callejero II El Perro
- 1981: La muerte del Palomo
- 1980: El hombre sin miedo Domingo Aparicio
- 1980: Hijos de tigre
- 1980: Los dos amigos
- 1980: Del otro lado del puente
- 1980: Perro callejero
- 1980: Tres de presidio
- 1979: La banda del Polvo Maldito
- 1979: El hijo del palenque
- 1979: Mexicano hasta las cachas Mauro
- 1979: El valiente vive... hasta que el cobarde quiere Fernando
- 1978: Pasiones encendidas (TV series) Marcial (1978)
- 1978: Son tus perjúmenes mujer
- 1978: Death in Cold Blood
- 1978: Mataron a Camelia la Texana
- 1978: Raza de viboras
- 1978: Carroña
- 1977: ¿Y ahora qué, señor fiscal? José (as Valentin Trujillo)
- 1977: Contrabando y traición Emilio Varela
- 1977: Traigo la sangre caliente
- 1977: Como gallos de pelea
- 1976: La virgen de Guadalupe Temoch
- 1976: Acorralados
- 1976: Alas doradas
- 1976: Mañana será otro día (TV series) Roberto
- 1975: La otra virginidad
- 1975: Simon Blanco Capuleque
- 1974: Cabalgando a la luna
- 1974: El desconocido
- 1973: Novios y amantes
- 1973: Cuando quiero llorar no lloro Victorino Peralta
- 1973: El diablo en persona Guadalupe Padilla
- 1972: Cuna de valientes Roberto Otero
- 1972: El ausente Valente Rojas Jr.
- 1972: Hoy he soñado con Dios Antonio
- 1971: Más allá de la violencia
- 1971: Ya somos hombres
- 1971: El juicio de los hijos Alberto
- 1971: Pequeñeces (TV series)
- 1970: Simplemente vivir Gerardo
- 1970: Las figuras de arena
- 1968: México de noche Julio
- 1966: Rage José
- 1963: Smiles of the City
- 1962: Behind the Clouds Niño herido (uncredited)
- 1962: El Extra (as Valentin Trujillo Gazcón)
- 1961: Juan sin miedo (uncredited)
- 1961: Three Sad Tigers
- 1961: Suerte te dé Dios Hijo de Chon
- 1960: El gran pillo (as Valentín Trujillo Gazcón)
