= Héctor Suárez =

Mexican actor (1938–2020)

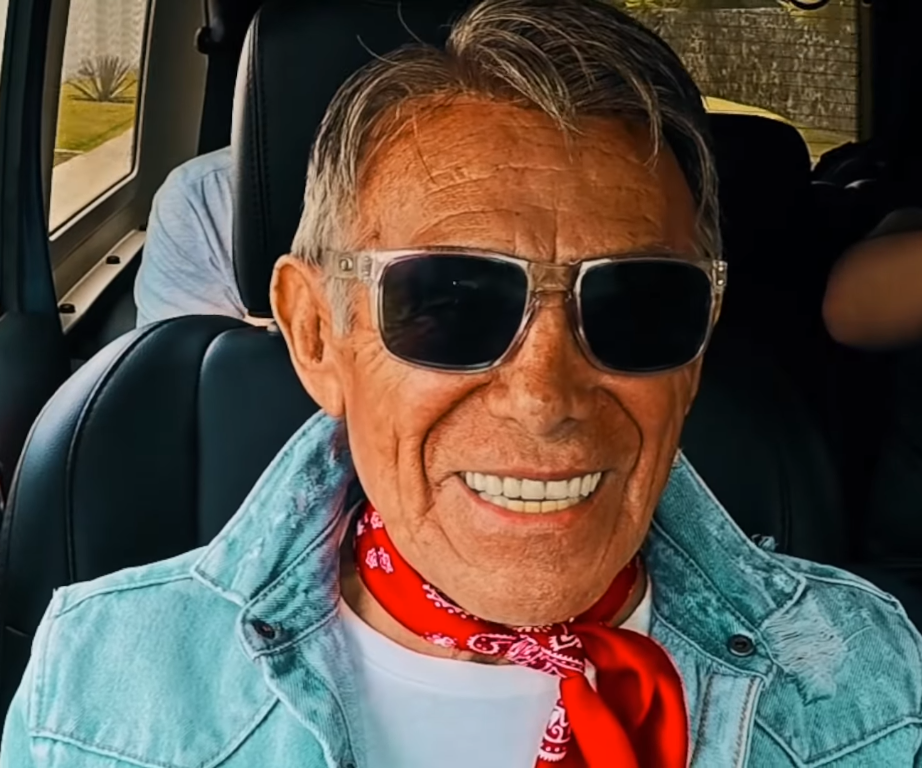
- Suárez in 2019
- Born: 21 October 1938; Mexico City, Mexico
- Died: 2 June 2020 (aged 81)
- Occupations: Actor; comedian; director
- Years active: 1962–2020

Héctor Suárez Hernández ([ˈeɣtoɾ ˈswaɾes]; 21 October 1938 – 2 June 2020) was a Mexican actor, comedian, and director. He appeared in about a hundred films and television shows in a career that spanned 60 years. He was noted for satirizing those in power and for touching on controversial social issues, at a time when it was still taboo in his country to do so. He was the father of Héctor Suárez Gomís, who is also an actor.

== Early life ==
Suárez was born in Mexico City on 21 October 1938. He started his film career in 1964, when he featured in El Asalto.

== Career ==
Suárez was notable for creating satire and parody of the wealthy and those in power. This was a challenging thing to do in the 1970s and 1980s, given the authoritarian government in power at the time. He would employ "spontaneous, dark humor" to critique social and political issues, such as poverty, corruption and the erosion of values. This was especially evident in the show he created called Qué nos pasa, which ridiculed government officials and shopkeepers. He also starred in that program, playing various characters including Flanagan (a rock fan who sometimes wore a mohawk), Dona Zoila (an aging woman who is obsessed with her looks), El No Hay (a lazy and apathetic man), and African-American child Tomas. He also played a "desperate, ragged proletarian" in El mil usos (1983).

Suárez was best known for numerous roles in Mexican comedy, but also participated in other productions outside the comedy genre, such as Cesar Chavez. He was the first comedian from Latin America to be "roasted" by fellow celebrities, when Comedy Central Latin America began airing the franchise in Mexico in 2013.

Suárez won numerous accolades throughout his six decade-long career in acting. These included three Diosas de Plata, a notable award bestowed by the association of journalists and filmmakers in Mexico (PECIME).

== Personal life ==
In 1991 Héctor Suárez met his future wife Zara Calderón. In 1998 they had their first son Rodrigo Suárez Calderón and thirteen years later Isabella Suárez Calderón was born.

== Death ==
Suárez died on 2 June 2020, at the age of 81. No cause of death was provided. He had been suffering from bladder cancer in the years leading up to his death, having been diagnosed with the disease in 2015. He consequently had to undergo several surgeries, and was reportedly "in recovery and cancer-free" after an operation in the middle of 2019. A message of condolence conveyed by the Secretariat of Culture praised Suárez as a "pioneer".

== Selected filmography ==
=== Film ===
- Los dos apóstoles (1966)
- National Mechanics (1972) as Gregorio
- Las fuerzas vivas (1975)
- El buscabullas (1976) as Pancho
- El ministro y yo (1976)
- El mil usos (1983)
- ¡Qué despadre! (2022)
- Atletico San Pancho (2001) as Don Pepe

=== Television ===
- El derecho de nacer (1981) as Héctor
- Tierra de Pasiones (2006) as José María "Chema" San Román
