= Alicia Encinas =

Mexican actress

Irma Alicia Encinas Cano (Tonichi, Sonora, 24 April 1954) is a Mexican actress.

== Biography ==
Irma Alicia Encinas Cano was born on 24 April 1954 in Tonichi. In 2015, she was described as a "veteran b-actress".

== Filmography ==
=== Telenovelas ===
- Muchacha italiana viene a casarse (2014) – Livia Alarcón
- Corazón indomable (2013) – Herminia
- Destilando amor (2007) – Bárbara de Torreblanca
- La fea más bella (2006–2007) – Matilde
- El pecado de Oyuki (1988) – Reyna Lemons
- Rosa salvaje (1987) – Lulú Carrillo
- Los años felices (1984) – Celeste
- Amalia Batista (1983) – Viviana Durán
- Soledad (1981) – Marian Monterani
- Viviana (1978) – Alicia
- Rina (1977) – Gisela
- Ven conmigo (1975)

=== TV series ===
- Esta historia me suena (2020–2022)
- Como dice el dicho (2012–2017-presente) – Gabriela/Claudette (dos episodios)
- La rosa de Guadalupe (2008–2010-presente) – Pura (Joven)/Raquel (dos episodios)
- Cachún cachún ra ra! (1981–1987) – Mrs. Evergreen

=== Films ===
- El callejón (2017) – Carlita
- Princesas de cartón (2014) – Sonia
- Ser (2010) – Bertha
- Sin ton ni Sonia (2003) – Tigresca
- Simón, el gran varón (2002)
- La banda del Antrax (2002) – Julieta
- A sangre fría (2002) – Irene
- Semilla de odio (2000) – Carolina
- Las tranzas de mi pueblo (1999)
- Horas amargas (1999)
- Regreso sangriento (1998)
- La sangre al río (1996)
- A oscuras me da risa (1995)
- El ganador (1992)
- Garra de tigre (1989)
- Persecución en Las Vegas: "Volveré" (1987) – Debbie
- Cacería de traficantes (1987)
- El último traficante (1987)
- La bruja de la vecindad (1987)
- Sinvergüenza pero honrado (1985)
- El rey del masaje (1985) – Gringa
- Jugándose la vida (1984)
- Cachún cachún ra ra! (Una loca, loca preparatoria) (1984) – Mrs. Evergreen
- El traficante II (1984)
- Los humillados (1984)
- El traficante (1983)
- La venganza de María (1983)
- Los hijos de Peralvillo (1983)
- Un verdadero trinquitero (1982) – Sarah
- El extraño hijo del Sheriff (1982)
- La cabra / La chèvre (1981)
- El sexo de los ricos (Triunfo sucio) (1981) – Susan
- Juan el enterrador (1981)
- La cosecha de mujeres (1981)
- El sátiro (1981)
- Sólo para damas (1981)
- Tetakawi (1980)
- Nuestro juramento (1980) – Elsa
- Carlos el terrorista (1979) – Esposa de Carlos
- El circo de Capulina (1978)
- The Bees (1978) – Alicia
- Tempestad (1978)
- Divinas palabras (1977)
- Ultraje a una mujer (1977) – Kathy
- Dios los cría (1977)
- El moro de Cumpas (1977) – La Güera
- En defensa propia (1977) – Rocío
- El guía de las turistas (1976)
- El niño y la estrella (1976)
- El trinquetero (1976)
- Sangre derramada (1975) – Laura
- El investigador Capulina (1975) – Lupita
- Las momias de San Ángel (1975)
- El sonámbulo (1974)
- El carita (1974)
- El primer paso... de la mujer (1974)
- Santo y Blue Demon vs. Drácula y el Hombre Lobo (1973)
- La amargura de mi raza (1972) – Carla

=== Teatro ===
- La Fiaca (2017)
- Más arriba... el cielo (2009)
