= Sonia Infante =

Mexican actress (1944–2019)

Sonia Angélica Infante López (2 February 1944 – 16 July 2019), known as Sonia Infante, was a Mexican film and television actress.

The daughter of Ángel Infante, she followed him and her uncle Pedro into an acting career. Her film debut was in 1960, and she made more than 50 films over most of the next decade. In 1967, she took a break from acting to marry producer Gustavo Alatriste and to raise their two children.

After divorcing Alatriste in 1982, Infante returned to acting in the mid-1980s. She also produced several films and starred in several telenovelas, such as El precio de la fama and Un rostro en mi pasado. During the 1980s, she married actor Andrés García, whom she later divorced. Infante retired from acting in 2007.

Infante died in July 2019, after suffering cardiac arrest while hospitalised in Mexico City for paralysis.
