= José Estrada (director) =

Mexican film director (1938–1986)

- Born: 23 August 1938; Mexico City, Mexico
- Died: 23 August 1986 (aged 48); Mexico City, Mexico
- Occupations: Film director, screenwriter
- Years active: 1971–1985
- Relatives: Luis Estrada (son)

José Estrada Aguirre (11 October 1938 – 23 August 1986) was a Mexican film director and screenwriter. He directed 19 films between 1971 and 1985. His 1985 film Mexican, You Can Do It was entered into the 14th Moscow International Film Festival.

== Selected filmography ==
- Para servir a usted (1971)
- Cayó de la gloria el diablo (1972)
- Los cacos (1972)
- Chabelo y Pepito contra los monstruos (1973)
- Uno y medio contra el mundo (1973)
- El profeta Mimí
- Chabelo y Pepito detectives (1974)
- El primer paso... de la mujer (1974)
- The Bricklayer (1975)
- Maten al león (1977)
- Los indolentes (1979)
- Ángela Morante, ¿crimen o suicidio? (1980)
- La Pachanga (1981)
- Ángel de Barrio (1982)
- Mexican, You Can Do It (1985)
