= Raúl Ramírez (actor) =

Mexican actor (1927–2014)

Raúl Ramírez (28 January 1927, in Guadalajara – 22 June 2014, in Mexico City) was a veteran Mexican actor.

== Selected filmography ==
=== Film ===
- La Hora Desnuda (1971)
- Todo el Horizonte Para Morir (1971)
- Secreto de Confesion (1971)
- La Satanica (1973)
- Blue Demon and Zovek in the Invasion of the Dead (1973)

=== Television ===
- La Satanica 1971
- Penthouse (telenovela) 1973
- Estafa de amor
- Lucía Sombra
- Cuando los hijos se van (telenovela)
- A Few Drinks
