= Gustavo Alatriste =

Mexican actor and film producer (1922–2006)

- Born: Gustavo Miguel Alatriste Rodriguez; 25 August 1922; Mexico City, Mexico
- Died: 22 July 2006 (aged 83); Houston, Texas, U.S.
- Spouses: Ariadna Welter (m. 1954; div. 1960) Silvia Pinal (m. 1961; div. 1967) Sonia Infante (m. 1967; div. 1982)
- Children: 3

Gustavo Miguel Alatriste (25 August 1922 – 22 July 2006) was a Mexican actor, director, and producer of films.

== Biography ==
Alatriste was married from 1961 through 1967 to the actress Silvia Pinal. They had one daughter, actress Viridiana Alatriste (1963–1982).

He was married several other times, to actresses Ariadne Welter, and Sonia Infante (the latter for 18 years) and had more than 20 other children, most of them in Mexico City and Guadalajara. Multiple sons have his name.

He began his career producing Luis Buñuel's Viridiana (1961), which starred his then-wife, actress Silvia Pinal. The film, considered one of the greatest in Cinema of Spain, was the first of three films by the trio.

In the eighties, Alatriste was named vice president of the Mexican CANACINE film organization.

Alatriste died of pancreatic cancer on 22 July 2006 in Houston, Texas, although it was not made public until 25 July, leading to confusion about the true date. La Crònica de hoy gives the date and time of death as Saturday, 22 July at 11:45pm, according to Alatriste's ex-wife Sonia Infante. It was actually 11:45AM, according to medical records.

== Filmography ==
=== Producer ===
- La casa de Bernarda Alba (1980)
- La grilla (1980)
- Human (1976)
- Tecnologías pesqueras (1975)
- Quien resulte responsable (1971)
- La güera Xóchitl (1971)
- Simón del desierto (1965)
- El ángel exterminador (1962)
- Viridiana (1961)

=== Director ===
- La combi asesina (1982)
- Historia de una mujer escandalosa (1982)
- Toña, nacida virgen (Del oficio) (1982)
- Aquel famoso Remington (1981)
- La casa de Bernarda Alba (1980)
- La grilla (1979)
- En la cuerda del hambre (1978)
- México, México, ra, ra, ra (1975)
- Las tecnologías pesqueras (1975)
- Los privilegiados (1973)
- Entre violetas (1973)
- Victorino (Las calles no se siembran) (1973)
- Human (1971)
- Q.R.R (Quien resulte responsable) (1970)
- Los adelantados (Citintabchén)

=== Actor ===
- Historia de una mujer escandalosa (1982)
- Aquel famoso Remington (1981)
- Victorino (Las calles no se siembran) (1973)

=== Writer ===
- Aquel famoso Remington (1981)
