= List of Mexican films of 1977 =

A list of the films produced in Mexico in 1977 (see 1977 in film):

| Title | Director | Cast | Genre | Notes |
|---|---|---|---|---|
| Alucarda | Juan López Moctezuma | Tina Romero, Claudio Brook | Horror | |
| Tintorera | René Cardona Jr | Hugo Stiglitz, Andrés García | Horror | |
| Las cenizas del diputado | Roberto Gavaldón | Lucha Villa, Carmen Salinas, Lalo González "El Piporro" | | |
| La Viuda Negra | Arturo Ripstein | Isela Vega, Mario Almada | | |
| Balún Canán | Benito Alazraki | Saby Kamalich, Tito Junco | | |
| Paper Flowers | Gabriel Retes | Gabriel Retes, Ignacio Retes, Ana Luisa Peluffo, Tina Romero, Claudio Brook | | Entered into the 28th Berlin International Film Festival |
| The Mansion of the 7 Mummies | Rafael Lanuza | Blue Demon, Superzan, María Cardinal, Claudio Lanuza, Manuel Palacios (Manolín) | | |
| Lo veo y no lo creo | Alfredo Zacarías | Capulina, Virma González, Angélica Chain, Rubén Aguirre, Enrique Pontón | | |
| Capulia chisme caliente | Gilberto Martínez Solares | Capulina, Pedro Infante Jr., Regina Torné, Rosalía Valdés, Rubén Aguirre | | |
| Pafnucio Santo | Rafael Corkidi | | | |
| Mina, Wind of Freedom | Antonio Eceiza | | | Entered into the 10th Moscow International Film Festival |
| Divinas palabras | Juan Ibáñez | Silvia Pinal, Mario Almada | | |
| Como gallos de pelea | Arturo Martínez | Sara García, Valentin Trujillo | | |
| Pafnucio Santo | Rafael Corkidi | Pablo Corkidi | | Selected as the Mexican entry for the Best Foreign Language Film at the 50th Academy Awards |
| Puerto maldito | Alfredo B. Crevenna | Mario Almada, Daniela Romo, Noé Murayama | | |
| Sor Tequila | | María Elena Velasco, Lucho Navarro | | |
| Sweetly You'll Die Through Love | Tulio Demicheli | Andrés García, Rossy Mendoza, George Hilton | | |
| The Divine Caste | Julián Pastor | Ignacio López Tarso, Ana Luisa Peluffo, Pedro Armendáriz Jr. | | |
