= El Búfalo de la Noche =

El Búfalo de la Noche can refer to:

- El Búfalo de la Noche, in translation The Night Buffalo, novel by Guillermo Arriaga
- El Búfalo de la Noche (film), 2007 film based on the novel
