= El búfalo de la noche (film) =

El Búfalo de la Noche
- Theatrical poster
- Directed by: Jorge Hernández Aldana
- Written by: Guillermo Arriaga; Jorge Hernández Aldana
- Produced by: La Neta Films/Naco Films
- Starring: Diego Luna; Liz Gallardo; Gabriel González; Irene Azuela; Camila Sodi
- Cinematography: Gustav Danielsson
- Music by: Omar Rodriguez Lopez
- Release date: 17 August 2007
- Country: Mexico
- Language: Spanish

El Búfalo de la Noche (The Night Buffalo) is a 2007 film directed by Jorge Hernández Aldana and based on Guillermo Arriaga's novel of the same name. The film was released in Mexico on August 17, 2007, and in the United States on April 14, 2009.

The film follows a young schizophrenic man, Gregorio (Gabriel González) who commits suicide, affecting the lives of his girlfriend (Liz Gallardo) and best friend (Diego Luna), who were involved in a secret relationship, betraying Gregorio's trust and inevitably becoming affected by guilt.

== Plot ==
It follows the plot line of the book, structuring it in a much more cinematic manner. The setting is contemporary México, and the characters are college students, struggling to get ahead in a world that is getting more and more alienated, where physical contact fills the gaps in interpersonal communication.

Arriaga explained during an interview: "It's a novel I wrote after teaching at the university for some time. After some years I realized young people are getting more emotionally damaged, their capacity as human beings of being introspective and relating to each other is every time more deteriorated, this is precisely what the movie tries to reflect... Since the novel came out its natural audience has been people under thirty, who understand it better because they are going through the same confusion stages as the characters."

The apparent incongruency of the characters' actions, thoughts and personalities reflects a great deal of Latin American idiosyncrasies. The director has stated: "The importance of making this film is the contradictions of the characters, that's what gets them close to real people. The stories of young people we get to see on the big screen at Latin America usually come from other countries, and therefore reflect a reality we do not have here; we dedicate this film to address these problems on Latin American youth with our own language... Before we started shooting I did not know México has a high rate of suicide and youth schizophrenia, one of the highest on the world. This told me we made the right choice in talking about these issues: besides entertaining, we want to make a portrait of Mexico, and a great deal of Latin America."

== Production ==
Another production company originally bought the rights to the novel, but the rights were revoked when the writer, Guillermo Arriaga, saw the project turn into something he did not agree with. Having gone through a similar ordeal years before with the 1999 movie Un Dulce Olor a Muerte (A Sweet Scent of Death), also based on one of his novels and directed by Gabriel Retes. He had promised himself he would not let another movie turn the message of his work into something unrelated.

Upon this decision, he took the project himself and set out to produce along with a local businessman. He admittedly looked for a novice director to get a fresh outlook and finally settled for Jorge Hernández, whom he had awarded as a member of a jury of a Venezuelan short film contest.

== Soundtrack ==
Omar Rodríguez-López of The Mars Volta wrote the score which was performed mostly by Rodríguez-López himself, with guest appearances by his Mars Volta bandmates. Portions of the soundtrack were used jointly in The Mars Volta's 2006 album Amputechture, while Rodríguez-López released Se Dice Bisonte, No Búfalo as "a response and expression of his feelings of the film."

== See also ==
- El Búfalo de la Noche (book)
- The Mars Volta

== Reception ==
The Hollywood Reporter said, "There's an abundance of sex and very little joy to be found in "The Night Buffalo," a pretentious mess that seems interminable even at 97 minutes."
