= Elpidia Carrillo =

Mexican actress (born 1961)

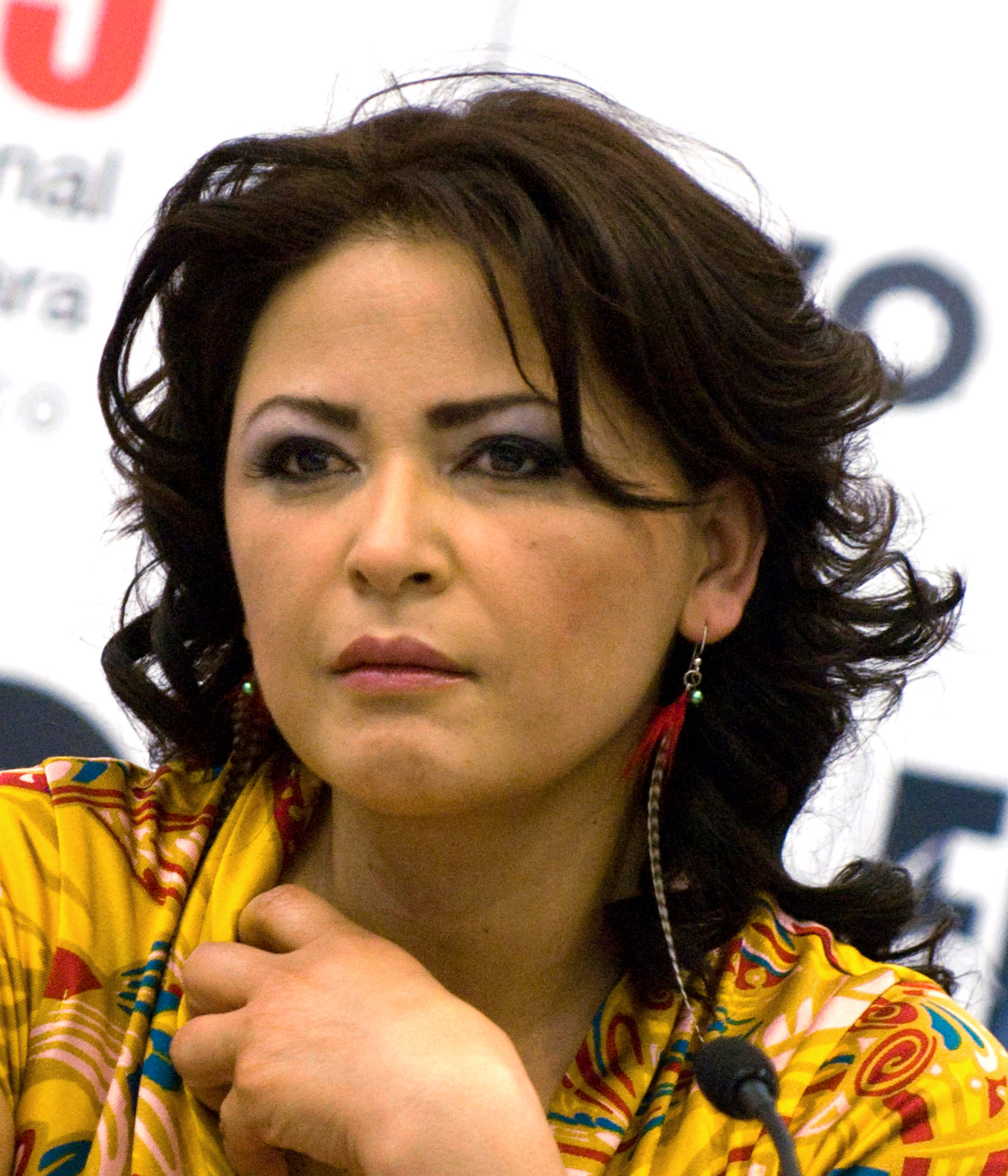
- Carrillo in 2010
- Born: August 16, 1961 (age 65); Parácuaro, Michoacán, Mexico
- Years active: 1977–2010, 2013–present
- Children: 2

Elpidia Carrillo (born August 16, 1961) is a Mexican actress and director. Her career includes roles in both film and television. Internationally she is best known for supporting roles in Predator, Bread and Roses, Nine Lives and Blue Beetle.

She was nominated for an Independent Spirit Award for Best Female Lead for her performance in Salvador. She is known for the role of Tecuichpo in the independent film The Other Conquest.

== Early life ==
Carrillo was born in Parácuaro, Michoacán, Mexico, on August 16, 1961. One of eight children in a family of farm laborers, her childhood was marked by violence and poverty. At the age of three, her father was murdered, forcing her eldest brother to assume responsibility of the family. Wanting Carrillo to get an education, he forged a birth certificate so she could begin first grade at age four.

When she was six, her brother was shot outside a theater and the family faced constant threats to their lives. When she was ten, Carrillo moved to Uruapan with an older sister where she dropped out of school as she began working alongside her sister at a Chinese restaurant.

== Career ==
=== Early career ===
Carrillo was discovered by a local photographer in Uruapan, Mexico and soon received a modeling contract. At 12 years old, director Rafael Corkidi cast Elpidia as Malinche in the surrealist Mexican feature film Pafnucio Santo. The film was Mexico's official submission to the Academy Awards that year, but with its many esoteric elements, it failed to garner a nomination. Due to the role involving nudity and her being under age, Carrillo was credited under the fake name Piya. Corkidi cast Carrillo again for a larger role in his film Deseos.

By the age of 16, she had shot her first lead role in the controversial Mexican feature Nuevo Mundo, directed by Gabriel Retes. Having worked numerous films, she decided to enroll in the Bellas Artes School in Mexico City.

=== Hollywood career ===
After numerous Mexican and International film and television credits, Carrillo's US film career quickly emerged as she did a series of critically acclaimed roles in award nominated US projects. Her first US film came when Academy Award winning director Tony Richardson cast her in a co-starring role in the film The Border opposite Jack Nicholson and Harvey Keitel. That was soon followed by a co-starring role in the Beyond the Limit opposite Richard Gere, Michael Caine, and Bob Hoskins, with the latter two receiving BAFTA Nominations for their performances.

For her third US film, Carrillo performed a small supporting role in another successful Academy Award nominated art film Under Fire for which Gene Hackman's performance received a Golden Globe nomination.

Next she made her US television debut in the role of Coana in the Primetime Emmy nominated mini-series Christopher Columbus.

Her first award nomination came when Oliver Stone cast her as the female lead of Maria in Salvador which earned Carrillo an Independent Spirit Award nomination for Best Female Lead, earned her co-star James Woods an Academy Award Nomination for Best Actor in a Leading Role, and earned Oliver Stone an Academy Award nomination with co-writer Rick Boyle for Best Original Screenplay, which they would both lose to Stone's other nominated screenplay that year, Platoon.

With awards and critical recognition all by the age of 25, Carrillo then accepted what would be one of the most recognizable and commercially successful roles of her career as the only actress appearing in the 1987 action film Predator opposite Arnold Schwarzenegger, Carl Weathers, Shane Black, and Jesse Ventura. Predator is widely considered the most commercially successful film of Carrillo's career and her most recognizable role. Though initially weakly received by critics, the film has subsequently gone on to become an action film classic making numerous "best of" lists in later years. At the time of its release, the film received an Oscar nomination for Best Visual Effects.

=== Post commercial success ===
Following the commercial success of Predator, and performances in television guest starring roles in Miami Vice and 21 Jump Street, Carrillo increasingly focused her career once again on US film and television, as well as returning to Mexican independent cinema with roles including Guldbagge Award winning La Hija del Puma, Una Cita con el Destino, Ariel Award winning City of the Blind, and the Guillermo del Toro produced Un Embrujo, a winner of 9 Ariel Awards.

Carrillo appeared in Gregory Nava's Mexican-American film My Family playing Isabel Magaña, the El Salvadorean refugee wife of Jimmy Smits, who won the Independent Spirit Award for Best Male Lead for the role. The film also won the Casting Society of America's Artios Award for Best Casting for a Drama Feature.

Johnny Depp cast her as the female lead of his only directorial effort, the controversial The Brave, which he also starred in along with Marlon Brando. The film received a Palme d'Or nomination at the 1997 Cannes Film Festival,.

Despite the critical recognition and various nominations throughout her career, Carrillo's first US acting award win was for her performance as Rosa in the drama Bread and Roses, which was nominated for the Palme d'Or at the 2000 Cannes Film Festival. Carrillo won the 2002 ALMA Award for Outstanding Supporting Actress in a Motion Picture, and shared the award with Elizabeth Peña.

Carrillo won the same award four years later, this time as sole recipient of the 2006 ALMA Award for Outstanding Supporting Actress in a Motion Picture for her performance as Sandra in Nine Lives written and directed by Rodrigo García. This was soon followed by a co-starring role in Seven Pounds which starred Will Smith.

Rodrigo García would then once again cast Carrillo, this time to co-star in the ensemble drama Mother and Child, this time sharing the screen and not the podium with Elizabeth Peña as well as Annette Bening, with whom she shares the majority of her scenes. The ensemble film also featured her former My Family co-star Jimmy Smits and Naomi Watts, Kerry Washington, and Samuel L. Jackson. The film premiered at the 2009 Toronto International Film Festival and Sundance Film Festival.

She did an episode of ER, titled "Under Control".

=== Later career ===
Carrillo returned to star in the Mexican family comedy Familia Gang and the independent features Relentless and Foreign Land.

She made her return to television with a major recurring arc as Linda Brenner in Nashville and a guest starring role as President Daphne Tejeda on Madam Secretary.

== Filmography ==
Year	Film	Role	Notes
1977	Pafnucio Santo	Malinche	Mexican movie; credited as "Piya"
1977	Deseos (film)		Mexican movie
1978	Pedro Páramo	Isabel	Mexican movie
1978	Nuevo Mundo	Mujer de Don Diego de Alba	Mexican movie
1979	Bandera Rota		
1980	Mein Freund Winnetou	Wetaton	Television series
1980	El Jugador de Ajedrez		Mexican movie
1981	La Virgen Robada		Mexican movie
1982	Bartholome - oder die Rückkehr der weißen Götter	Ms. Anna	Indo-German television production
1982	The Border	Maria	
1983	The Honorary Consul	Clara Fortnum	Hollywood debut
1983	Under Fire	Sandinista	
1983	Undercover of the Night	Woman	Rolling Stones music video
1985	Christopher Columbus	Coana	Italian production, mini series
1986	Salvador	Maria	
1987	Let's Get Harry	Veronica	
1987	Predator	Anna Gonsalves	
1988	Una Cita con el Destino		Mexican movie
1989	The Assassin	Elena	
1989	Miami Vice	Maria Pedroza / Sister Felicia	Television series
1990	Dangerous Passion	Angela	Made for television movie
1990	Predator 2	Anna Gonsalves	Cameo
1991	Lightning Field	Dolores	Made for television movie
1994	La Hija del Puma	Maria	Mexican movie
1995	My Family	Isabel	
1995	De Tripas, Corazon	Meifer	Mexican movie
1997	The Pretender	Nia	Television series
1997	The Brave	Rita	
1998	Un Embrujo		
1998	They Come at Night	Maria Velazquez	
1999	The Other Conquest (La Otra Conquista)	Tecuichpo/Isabel	
2000	Things You Can Tell Just by Looking at Her	Carmen	
2000	Bread and Roses	Rosa	
2002	La Otra		Mexican telenovela
2002	Solaris		
2002	Law and Order: Special Victims Unit	Maria Ramos	Episode: "Protection"
2003	Kingpin	Lupita	Mini-series
2004	A Day Without a Mexican	Cata	Mexican movie
2005	Nine Lives	Sandra	
2006	Ladrones y Mentirosos	Isabel	
2007	Tortilla Heaven	Hermenegilda	
2008	Seven Pounds	Connie Tepos	
2010	Mother and Child	Sofia	
2018	Mayans M.C.	Victoria "Vicki" Ariza	6 episodes
2019	Euphoria	Sonia Perez	8 episodes
2020	The Tax Collector	Janet	
2020	Songbird	Lita Garcia	
2022	Guillermo del Toro's Cabinet of Curiosities	Amelia	Episode: "Lot 36"
2023	Blue Beetle	Rocio Reyes	
