= Tina Romero =

Mexican-American actress (born 1951)

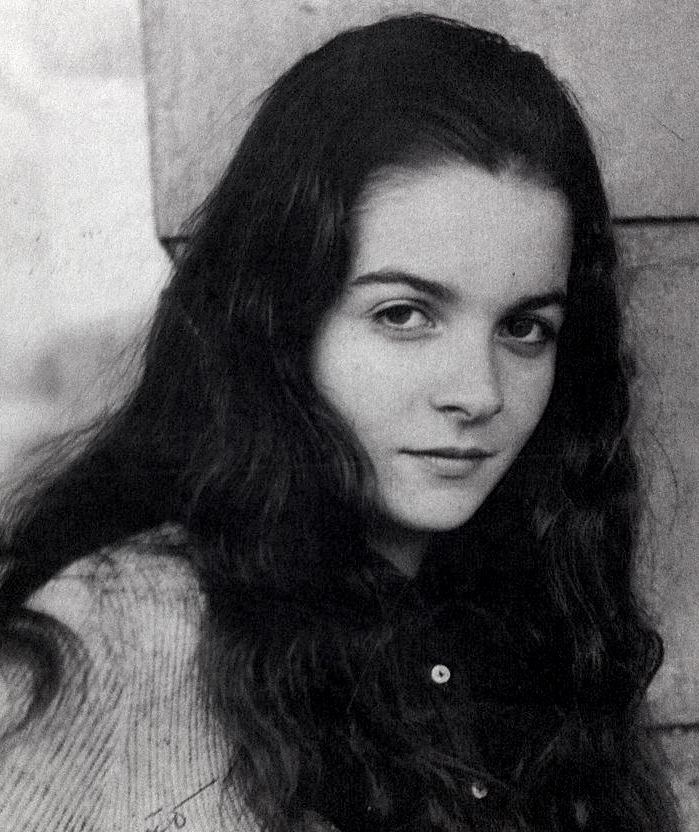
- Born: Ernestina Romero Alcázar; August 14, 1951 (age 75); New York City, New York, U.S.
- Occupation: Actress
- Years active: 1976–present
- Spouse: Gabriel Retes (divorced)
- Children: 2

Tina Romero (born Ernestina Romero Alcázar, August 14, 1951) is an American-Mexican actress. A native of New York City, Romero moved to Mexico in her youth, and later established a career there as an actress. Her early film roles included The Divine Caste (1973) and the title character in the horror film Alucarda (1977). She has also appeared in U.S. films, including Missing (1982), opposite Sissy Spacek and Jack Lemmon.

Romero has also appeared in numerous Mexican television series, including numerous telenovelas, such as Rosalinda (1999), Mi pecado (2009), Quiero amarte (2014),

== Early life ==
Romero was born on August 14, 1951, in New York City, the daughter of Mexican parents. She and her family relocated to Mexico in 1958 where she developed her skills in acting school. In 1976, at the age of 27, she made her debut as a protagonist in the movie Lo Mejor de Teresa. The same year she participated in the films Chin Chin el Teporocho and Las Poquianchis, directed by Felipe Cazals.

== Career ==
In 1977, she starred in her first mexican telenovela Santa, and starred in the film Alucarda, directed by Juan Lopez Moctezuma with Claudio Brook, David Silva, considered a classic horror film. In 1979 she filmed Cuatro mujeres y un Hombre, Bandera Rota and My Horse Cantador, and also appeared in the telenovela Angel Guerra alongside Andrea Palma and Diana Bracho.

Romero married in the 1980s to the Mexican film director Gabriel Retes, with whom she had two children.

In the 1980s she filmed Estampas de Sor Juana and in 1982 makes her Hollywood debut in the film Missing starring Sissy Spacek. In 1983 Romero returned to Mexico and made film and television appearances as The Castaways of Liguria directed by her then husband Retes. In 1986 she starred in the film Miracles, and in 1988 returned to Hollywood to take part in Clif Ossmond's movie The Penitent. In México, she starred in the telenovelas La Casa al Final de la Calle and Simplemente María.

In the 1990s and 2000s she participated in such notable telenovelas as; Cadenas de Amargura (1991), Muchachitas (1991), Alondra (1995), Rosalinda (1999, with Thalía), Abrázame muy fuerte (2000), and most recently Pasión (2007), Mi pecado (2009) and Una Maid en Manhattan (2011), among others.

== Filmography ==
=== Film ===
Year	Title	Role	Notes	Ref.
1973	The Divine Caste	Elide		
1976	Lo Mejor de Teresa	Teresa		
1976	Las Poquianchis	María Rosa		
1977	Paper Flowers	Toletole		
1977	Alucarda	Alucarda / Lucy Westenra		
1979	Broken Flag	Ana		
1980	Estampas de Sor Juan		Short film	
1980	Las grandes aguas	Mara		
1982	Missing	María		
1983	Las Apariencias Engañan			
1984	Noche de Carnaval	Irma		
1984	Mujeres Salvajes	Gaviota		
1985	Los Naufragos de Liguria	Costanza		
1986	De Puro Relajo			
1986	Los Piratas	Costanza		
1986	Miracles	Juanita		
1988	The Penitent	Sandra		
1989	Violencia a sange fría		Television film	
1991	Silencio de Muerte			
1993	Kino	Cortesana		
1994	La Señorita			
1994	Una Luz en la Escalera	Teresa Guzman		
1995	Magnicídio			
1998	Crisis	Sandra		
1999	Un Dulce Olor a Muerte	La Chata		
2004	Las Lloronas	Esther		
2006	Sea of Dreams	Raquel		
2015	The Pleasure Is Mine	Mama		
2017	The Kids Are Back	Lulú		
2018	Más sabe el Diablo por viejo	Nelly Durán		
2018	Silencio	Nurse		

=== Television ===
- Dama y obrero (American telenovela) (2013)- Alfonsina
- Rosario (2013) - Griselda
- Amor Bravío (Valiant Love) (2012)- Rosario Sanchez (Mother of Alonso/Nurse)
- Una Maid en Manhattan (Maid In Manhattan) (2011-2012) - Carmen "La Nana"
- Llena de amor (Fill Me With Love) (2010) - Paula de Ruiz
- Mi pecado (Burden of Guilt) (2009) - Asuncion
- Verano de amor (Summer Of Love) (2009) - Pura Guerra
- El juramento (Secret Lies) (2008) - Silvia
- Pasión (Passion) (2007) - Criada
- Amarte así (Looking for Dad) (2005) - Evangelina Lizárraga
- El juego de la vida (The Game of Life) (2001) - Mercedes Pacheco
- Abrazame muy fuerte (Embrace Me) (2000) - Jacinta
- Rosalinda (1999) - Dolores Romero
- La mentira (Twisted Lies) (1998) - Irma Moguel
- La culpa (1996) - Lorena
- Alondra (1995) - Cecilia
- Buscando el paraíso (1994) - Elsa
- Mágica juventud (1992)
- Muchachitas (1991) - Verónica
- Cadenas de amargura (1991) - Martha Fernandez
- La hora marcada (episode "Por tu bien") - Carmen (1989)
- Simplemente María (1989) - Gabriela
- La Casa al Final de la Calle (1987) - Marina
- El Rincón de los Prodigios (1987)
- Aprendiendo a Vivir (1984) - Silvia
- Bella y Bestia (1979)
- Parecido al Amor(1979)
- Ángel Guerra (1979) - Dulcenombre
- Santa (1978) - Santa
