= Fando y Lis =

- Directed by: Alejandro Jodorowsky
- Written by: Alejandro Jodorowsky
- Based on: A play by Fernando Arrabal
- Produced by: Juan López Moctezuma; Roberto Viskin
- Starring: Diana Mariscal; Sergio Kleiner
- Cinematography: Rafael Corkidi; Antonio Reynoso
- Edited by: Fernando Suarez
- Music by: Hector Morley; Pepe Ávila
- Production company: Producciones Pánicas
- Release dates: 1968 (Acapulco Film Festival); July 1972 (Mexico)
- Running time: 97 minutes
- Country: Mexico
- Language: Spanish

Fando y Lis ('Fando and Lis') is a 1968 Mexican surrealist film directed by Alejandro Jodorowsky in his feature-length directorial debut. It is an adaptation of a 1962 play of the same name by Fernando Arrabal, who was working with Jodorowsky on performance art at the time. The film was shot in high-contrast black-and-white on the weekends with a small budget and was first shown at the Acapulco Film Festival in 1968. Fando y Lis stars Sergio Klainer and Diana Mariscal as the titular pair who embark on a surreal quest in search of Tar, a mythical heaven-like place.

== Plot ==
The film follows Fando (Klainer) and his paraplegic girlfriend Lis (Mariscal) through a barren, post-apocalyptic wasteland in search of the mythical city of Tar, a place where one will know the true nature of eternity, and reach enlightenment. On their journey they see many odd and profoundly disturbing characters and events.

The narrative of the film leaves a lot to the audience's interpretation, as the avant-garde and surreal nature in which the events of the film are presented mimic the workings of the subconscious.

== Cast ==
- Sergio Klainer as Fando
- Diana Mariscal as Lis
- Juan José Arreola as Well-Dressed Man with Book
- Alejandro Jodorowsky as Puppeteer

== Release ==
Fando y Lis premiered at the 1968 Acapulco Film Festival. A full-scale riot subsequently broke out, leading to the film being banned in Mexico. Fando y Lis was shown in New York's 5th Avenue Cinema where it was dubbed, re-edited and cut by 13 minutes. It was shown in London in February 1971, re-titled as Tar Babies, running 98 minutes. It was not released in Mexico until July 1972.

Fando y Lis received a 4K digital restoration by ABKCO in 2020. ABKCO partnered with Alamo Drafthouse to release it on their streaming platform that year and released it on Blu-ray and DVD in 2021.

== Reception ==
Fando y Lis was released in New York City to generally negative reviews, with many critics comparing it unfavorably to Fellini Satyricon, which had recently opened. It was also criticized for its shock value, while acknowledging its role in surrealist media.

On the review aggregator website Rotten Tomatoes, 80% of 10 critics' reviews are positive, with an average rating of 6.9/10.

== In other media ==
An audio clip of dialogue from the film is featured in Agalloch's album The Mantle, at the end of the track "The Hawthorne Passage."

== Bibliography ==
- Rosenbaum, Jonathan (1991). Midnight movies. Da Capo Press. ISBN 0-306-80433-6. Archived from the original on August 9, 2011.
