= Gonzalo Vega =

Mexican actor (1946–2016)

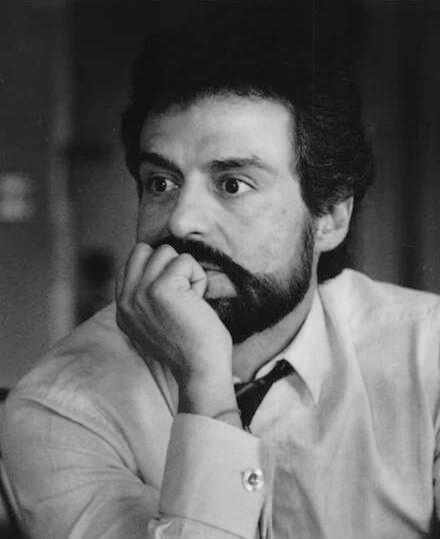
- Gonzalo Vega in 1987
- Born: Gonzalo Agustín Vega González; November 29, 1946; Mexico City, Mexico
- Died: October 10, 2016 (aged 69); Mexico City, Mexico
- Occupation: Actor
- Years active: 1969–2010; 2014–2016
- Children: Gabriela Vega; Marimar Vega; Zuria Vega; Gonzalo Vega

Gonzalo Agustín Vega González (November 29, 1946 – October 10, 2016) was a Mexican film, theatre and television actor.

== Personal life ==
He was also father of the actresses Zuria Vega, Marimar Vega and a son, Gonzalo Vega Jr.

In 2010 he was diagnosed with preleukemia and retired from acting. He returned to acting in 2014, after a marked improvement in health.

== Filmography ==
=== Films ===
Year	Title	Role	Notes
1969	Los recuerdos del porvenir	Capitán Damián Álvarez	Film debut
1969	Las Pirañas aman en Cuaresma	Chevo	
1970	Misión cumplida	Javier	
1970	¿Por qué nací mujer?	Hernán	
1970	La agonía de ser madre		
1971	Rosario	Víctor	
1971	Más allá de la violencia		
1971	Pubertinaje		Segment: "Una cena de navidad"
1972	Hoy he soñado con Dios	Melesio	
1973	Aquellos años	Ignacio Zaragoza	
1974	Crónica de un amor	Fernando	
1974	Adorables mujercitas		
1974	Ante el cadáver de un líder	Baldomero Palomares Blanco	
1974	El juicio de Martín Cortés	Óscar Román / Martín Cortés	
1975	Y la mujer hizo al hombre		
1976	Las poquianchis	Tepocate	
1976	Tango		
1978	Las mariposas disecadas	Jorge	Voice only
1978	El lugar sin límites	Pancho	Ariel Award for Best Supporting Actor
1979	Spree	Batista	
1981	La virgen robada		Short film
1981	Víctima de la seducción	Felipe	
1981	El sexo de los ricos	Roberto	
1981	Visita al pasado	Pablo	
1981	El color de nuestra piel	Manuel Torres	
1981	Ángel del barrio	"Kid" Orizaba	
1982	Retrato de una mujer casada	Guillermo Contreras	
1982	Antonieta	Manuel Rodriguez Lozano	
1983	Las Apariencias engañan		
1983	Los renglones torcidos de Dios		
1984	Ya nunca más	Enrique Aranda	
1984	Nocaut	Rodrigo Saracho	
1985	Tiempo de lobos		
1985	Terror y encajes negros	Giorgio Martinez	
1987	Life Is Most Important	Candelario	Ariel Award for Best Actor
1987	Yo soy el asesino		
1991	La mestiza		
1994	Al otro lado del túnel	Aurelio	
1994	Una maestra con ángel		
1997	Ambición mortal		
2002	Las caras de la luna	Federico	
2003	Ya no los hacen como antes	Benito	
2003	La tregua	Martin Santome	
2009	Daniel & Ana	Señor Boda	
2010	A través del silencio	Lorenzo	
2010	Seres: Génesis	Profesor Owen	
2010	Silla eléctrica para moscas	Narrator	Voice only, short film
2013	Nosotros los Nobles	Germán Noble	
2013	The Boy Who Smells Like Fish	Guillermo Garibai	

=== Television ===
Year	Title	Role	Notes
1971	Sublime redención		Television debut
1978	Pecado de amor	Walter	
1978	Donde termina el camino		
1979	Cumbres Borrascosas		
1980	La divina Sarah	Damala	
1981	Toda una vida	Eduardo	
1983	Mañana es primavera	Bruno	
1984	La traición	Franco Visconti	
1986	Cuna de lobos	José Carlos Larios Creel	Lead role
1986	Muchachita	José Manuel	
1989	Las grandes aguas	Carlos Rivas	
1990	En carne propia	Octavio Muriel	
1992	Tenías que ser tú	Oswaldo Beltrán	
1995	Alondra	Bruno Leblanc	
1999	La vida en el espejo	Santiago Román	
2001	Uroboros	Salvador	TV mini-series
2004	La heredera		
2008	Tengo todo	Orlando	
2013	1913, un año crucial	Voice	Television film
