= Divinas palabras =

Divinas palabras may refer to:

- Divinas palabras, a 1919 play by Ramón del Valle-Inclán
- Divinas palabras (1987 film), a Spanish film directed by José Luis García Sánchez; based on the play
- Divinas palabras (1977 film), a Mexican film directed by Juan Ibáñez; based on the play
