= Apolinar (film) =

- Directed by: Julio Castillo
- Screenplay by: Julio Castillo
- Story by: Julio Castillo; Blanca Peña; Luis Torner
- Produced by: Alejandro Jodorowsky; Robert Viskin
- Starring: Macaria; Eduardo Garduño; Fernando Rosales
- Cinematography: Rafael Corkidi
- Edited by: Federico Landeros
- Music by: José Antonio Guzmán Bravo
- Release date: 1971
- Running time: 89 minutes
- Country: Mexico
- Language: Spanish

Apolinar is a Mexican fantasy drama film directed in 1971 by Julio Castillo and produced by Alejandro Jodorowsky and Robert Viskin. The film was shot on location in and around Atotonilco, San Miguel de Allende, Guanajuato, in Mexico. Art direction was by Octavio Ocampo.

This was the only film direction undertaken by Castillo, later notable as a theatrical director.

Although a release date of 1972 is often given, the film was never released publicly, although stills were circulated by Peña (later Castillo's wife) and Torner, the co-writers with Castillo.

== Plot ==
Tancredo, a poor man, is in love with a rich girl, who does not return his feelings. One day when she is bathing in a river, a flood sweeps her away and Tancredo is unable to save her. Mad with grief, he steals the sun. The gods call Apolinar to restore light to the earth, but he is obstructed by the magician of darkness, until by means of a telescope he is able to send a bag of light to Tancredo, now grown old. Tancredo goes to the seashore and opens the bag of light as an offering to his beloved, whereupon the sun returns to the earth.

== Cast ==
- Macaria
- Eduardo Garduño
- Fernando Rosales
- Aarón Hernán
- José Luis Castañeda
- Bertha Moss
- Pilar Souza
- Ofelia Medina
- Enrique Rocha
- Sergio Kleiner (as Sergio Klainer)
- Octávio Galindo
- Adrián Ramos
- José Gálvez
- Pancho Córdova
- Tito Novaro
- Luis Torner
- Manuel Calvo (as Manolo Calvo)
- Enrique del Castillo
- María Clara Zurita
- Humberto Wagner
- Roberto Schlosser
- Julia Marichal
- Gabriela
- Susan Berger
- Abel Woolrich
- Paco Ignacio Taibo I
- Alfredo Wally Barrón
- Consuelo Quezada
