= La Hija del Jardinero =

Mexican telenovela

- Genre: Telenovela, Romantic drama
- Created by: Mariela Romero
- Written by: Mariela Romero, Lorenza Engell, Freddy Salvador Hernández
- Directed by: Luis Alberto Lamata
- Starring: Mariana Ochoa, Carlos Torres
- Music by: Katharine McPhee and Andrea Bocelli
- Opening theme: "Somos Novios" (Armando Manzanero featuring Mariana Ochoa)
- Country of origin: Mexico
- Original language: Spanish
- No. of episodes: 180

Production
- Producer: Igor Manrique
- Cinematography: Sergio Treviño

Original release
- Network: TV Azteca
- Release: August 18, 2003 – April 23, 2004

Related
- Un camino hacia el destino (2016)

La Hija Del Jardinero ("The Gardener's Daughter") is a Mexican telenovela directed by Luis Alberto Lamata. It aired from August 18, 2003 until April 23, 2004 on TV Azteca in Mexico.

== Plot ==
La Hija Del Jardinero was the first soap opera or telenovela that featured actress Mariana Ochoa. Ochoa played the main role, Luisa Fernanda, a talented and beautiful girl from a family that hides a secret. She fell in love with the character Carlos Eduardo, a smart doctor, who has a girlfriend named Jennifer de la Vega.

None of them knows the truth of their past.

Years ago, Luisa Fernanda's mother, Amelia, fell in love with Luis Alejandro Montero and got pregnant. Amelia's father, Fernando, got so mad that he never let her come back home, thinking that the gardener was the father. The fact is that the real father is Luis Alejandro Montero whose first action was to unrecognize his daughter and immediately marry an older woman, Marisa Gomez Ruiz. She had a son, who fell in love years later with Amelia's daughter, Luisa Fernanda. When Montero married Marisa, the owner of the bank, he wanted to ruin her and her son Carlos Eduardo when she goes into a coma but he fails. Consuela, Amelia's sister, who hated her niece, Luisa, and was in love with Montero later dies in a car accident trying to reach her niece to tell her father the truth: Luisa Fernanda will be the heiress of her grandfather Fernando Alkantera too or the only one and not only or at all Consuela.

== Cast ==
Actor	Character	Known as
Mariana Ochoa	Luisa Fernanda Pérez / young Amelia Alcántara	Main Heroine, daughter of Amelia and Luis Alejandro, adopted daughter of Pedro, in love with Carlos Eduardo
Carlos Torres	Carlos Eduardo Gómez Ruíz	Main Hero, doctor, son of Marisa, in love with Luisa Fernanda
José Alonso	Fernando Alcántara	Villain in first episodes, then good. Rich businessman, father of Amelia and Consuelo
Sergio Kleiner	Lic. Antonio Ordóñez	Attorney, collegaue of Marisa
Fernando Ciangherotti	Luis Alejandro Montero	Main Villain. Husband of Marisa, stepfather of Carlos, father of Luisa Fernanda and Armando
Ramiro Huerta	Pedro Pérez	Gardener, husband of Amelia.
Kenya Gascon	Marisa Gómez Ruíz	Bank owner, mother of Carlos Eduardo, wife of Luis Alejndro
Ángela Fuste	Amelia Alcántara	Daughter of Don Fernando, mother of Luisa Fernanda, wife of Pedro, died in a car accident
Alpha Acosta	Consuelo Alcántara	Main Villain. Daughter of Don Fernando, wife of Heriberto, died in a car accident, when she hallucinates her sister
Gerardo Acuña	Heriberto Sotomayor	Villain, Husband of Consuelo, father of Vanessa, died of a brain tumour
Alejandra Lazcano	Vanessa Sotomayor	Daughter of Heriberto, friend of Luisa Fernada, in love with Carlos Eduardo then with Orlando
Gabriela Vergara	Jennifer de la Vega	Villain. In love with Carlos Eduardo, sister of Carolina
Kenya Mori	Carolina 'Caro' de la Vega	Younger sister of Jennifer, in love with Armando
Betty Monroe	Andreina Torres	Colleague of Jennifer, lover of Luis Alejandro
Eduardo Victoria	Leopoldo Araoz	Villain, Friend of Luis Alejandro, later enemy of Luis Alejandro
Ana Ofelia Murguía	Rigoberta Rondón	Don Fernando's housekeeper
Loló Navarro	Rosario	Nanny of Carlos Eduardo
Laura Padilla	Sister Joaquina	Sister of Pedro
Mariana Urrutia	Sister Sonrisa	Friend of Luisa Fernanda
Nubia Martí	Guadalupe 'Lupe' González	Collegaue of Marisa, mother of César, in love with Lic. Ordóñez
Luis Alberto López	César Gonzalez	Friend of Luisa Fernanda, son of Guadalupe, in love with Clarita
Erika de la Rosa	Clarita	Maid in Marisa's house, in love with César
Carina Sarti	Alicia	Luis Alejandro's secretary
Abel Woolrich	Pancho	Gardener, collegaue of Pedro
Angélica Magaña	Lucero	Friend of Luisa Fernanda and Vanessa
Mariana Isla	Gabriela	School-mate of Carolina, Luisa Fernanda, Lucero and Vanessa
Eduardo Arroyuelo	Augusto Prieto	Attorney, friend of Luisa Fernanda
Masha Kostiurina	young Consuelo Alcántara	Daughter of Don Fernando
Carlos East Jr.	Armando Pereira / young Luis Alejandro Montero	Son of Luis Alejandro, in love with Carolina
Luis Gerónimo Abreu	Dr. Alfredo Anzola	Doctor
Cinthia Vázquez	Xóchitl Infante	Maid in Alfredo'house, in love with Alfredo
José Antonio Coro	Dr. Arreola	Doctor
Juan Luis Orendain	Dr. Serrano	Doctor
Rodrigo Abed	Guillermo	PR manager
Seraly Morales	Marina	Colleague of Guillermo
Alberto Casanova	Bobby	Friend of Armando
Fernando Sarfati	Rubén Cortés	Father of César
Jesús Vargas	Francisco Solórzano	Private detective, worked for Luis Alejandro
Luis Penagos	Ignacio	
Luis Ernesto Franco	Orlando	Musician, in love with Vanessa
Dora Cordero		
Shirley Sánchez		
