= Lisset =

Mexican actress and singer

- Born: Lisset Gutiérrez Salazar; November 3, 1973 (age 52); Guadalajara, Jalisco, Mexico
- Occupations: Actress, singer
- Years active: 1999–present
- Spouses: Demián Bichir (m. 2001; div. 2003) Lisardo (2008–2014)

Lisset Gutiérrez Salazar (born November 3, 1973), also known as Lisset, is a Mexican actress and singer.

== Filmography ==
=== Film ===
Year	Title	Role	Notes
2001	Huapango	Julia	
2010	Héroes verdaderos	Narrator	

=== Television ===
Year	Title	Role	Notes
1999	Catalina y Sebastián	Jessica	Recurring role
2004	Soñarás	Dolores	Recurring role
2004–2005	Las Juanas	Yolanda Canales	
2005–2006	Amor en custodia	Carolina Costas	
2006–2007	Montecristo	Diana / Lorena	
2008	Vivir por ti	Beatriz del Toro	
2010–2011	Para volver a amar	Denisse	Recurring role
2012	Amor bravío	Miriam Farca de Díaz	Recurring role
2013	Gossip Girl: Acapulco	Ana Cecilia de la Vega	Guest star 9 episodes
2013–2014	Lo que la vida me robó	Fabiola Guillén Almonte / Fabiola Almonte Giacinti	
2014–2015	La sombra del pasado	Adelina Lozada Torres	Recurring role
2015–2016	A que no me dejas	Mónica Greepe Villar	Recurring role
2017	Enamorándome de Ramón	Virginia Davis de Medina	Guest star 39 episodes
2017–2018	Me declaro culpable	Bianca Olmedo	Recurring role
2020	Te doy la vida	Patricia	Guest star
2020	Médicos, línea de vida	Natalia Avendaño	Guest star 52 episodes
2020–2021	Esta historia me suena	Nora / Karina	Guest star (season 3; 11 episodes) / season 4; 2 episodes)
2021	Tic Tac Toc: El reencuentro	Natalia	Main role
2021–2022	Mi fortuna es amarte	Samia Karam Mansour de Haddad	
2025	Me atrevo a amarte	Crisanta Méndez	
2026	Sabor a ti	Filomena Hurtado	
