= Seducción (TV series) =

1986 Mexican television series

- Genre: Telenovela; Drama
- Created by: Enrique Jarnes
- Written by: Marc Rostand
- Directed by: Manolo García
- Starring: Maribel Guardia; Manuel Capetillo Jr. Leonardo Daniel; Sergio Ramos "El Comanche"; Roxana Saucedo; Sergio Klainer; Irma Dorantes; Olivia Collins
- Opening theme: Instrumental by Guillermo Méndez Guiú
- Country of origin: Mexico
- Original language: Spanish

Production
- Executive producer: Francisco Burillo
- Production locations: Acapulco, Mexico
- Cinematography: Gustavo Gavira
- Production company: Televisa

Original release
- Network: Canal de las Estrellas
- Release: 1986 – 1986

Related
- El engaño; Lista negra

Seducción (English title:Seduction) is a Mexican telenovela produced by Francisco Burillo for Televisa in 1986. It is an original story of Enrique Jarnes, adapted by Marc Rostand and directed by Manolo García.

Maribel Guardia and Manuel Capetillo Jr. starred as protagonists, while Sergio Klainer starred as antagonist. Sergio Ramos "El Comanche", Leonardo Daniel and Olivia Collins starred as stellar performances.

== Plot ==
In the beautiful port of Acapulco the story of two completely different families develops. The first one is formed by the widower Santiago and his daughters Marina and Lupita. He is a possessive father limiting his daughters and denying the possibility of fulfillment in life, because of his outdated ideas and believes that women should only live devoted to family, home and children. The two girls suffer from authoritarianism and incomprehension of his father, especially the youngest, Lupita. Her father blames her for the death of her mother because she died at her birth.

The second family, meanwhile, is made by Alejandro and Virginia, who are divorcing because of the assurance that their marriage is not working because of irreconcilable differences. They are the parents of Juan Carlos and Gabriela, intelligent young and focused, who were capable of accepting the separation of their parents, although the latter are somewhat misplaced in life and therefore have not known how to be the best parents and spouses.

Julio is one of the protagonists of the story. He is a troubled young man who since childhood has had a family problem, and has become withdrawn and quiet. His only support is his best friend, Javier who is his antithesis: an outgoing, womanizing playboy. He owns the hotel in Acapulco where the daughters of Santiago work. Julio and Javier go to a party organized by Alejandro on his yacht to celebrate her divorce, along with Isabel and Roxana, the first the love of Julio who hides a scandalous past; and the second the latest conquest of Javier.

Lupita and Marina are invited to the same party by Juan Carlos. Julio and Marina meet and are immediately attracted, but must fight against the opposition of Santiago and Isabel who is not willing to let go of Julio. There is also Benjamin, an unscrupulous gangster who will make your life checkered many characters and cause more conflict to the plot.

== Cast ==
- Maribel Guardia as Marina
- Manuel Capetillo Jr. as Julio
- Leonardo Daniel as Javier Fuentes
- Sergio Ramos "El Comanche" as Santiago
- Roxana Saucedo as Guadalupe "Lupita"
- Sergio Klainer as Benjamín
- Irma Dorantes as Virginia
- Rubén Rojo as Alejandro
- Ofelia Cano as Gabriela "Gaby"
- Servando Manzetti as Juan Carlos
- Angélica Chain as Roxana
- Olivia Collins as Isabel
- Raquel Morell as Mónica
- Miguel Priego as Rubén
- Manolo García as Arturo
- Juan Eduardo as Rafael
- Martha Ortiz as Verónica
- Miguel Ángel Fuentes as Chaco
- Myrrah Saavedra as Adriana
- Constantino Costas as Saúl
- Miguel Suárez as Alberto
- Diana Ferretti as Alicia
- Patricia Rivera as Dra. Marcia Robles
- Darwin Solano as Torres
- Tere Suárez as Betty
- Jean Safont as Dr. Gordoa
- Oscar Servin as Armenta
- Gustavo Ganem as Raúl
- Eduardo Borja as Supervisor
- Gerardo Murguía
- Nerina Ferrer
- Nuria Bages
- Héctor Sampson as Kung Fu Instructor
