= El valle de los miserables =

- Directed by: René Cardona Jr.
- Written by: Enrique Albuerne (novel); René Cardona Jr. Jorge Patiño
- Produced by: Gustavo Bravo Ahuja
- Starring: Mario Almada; Ana Luisa Peluffo; Alma Muriel; Silvia Mariscal
- Cinematography: Daniel López Santos
- Edited by: Alfredo Rosas Priego
- Music by: Gustavo César Carrión
- Distributed by: CONACINE
- Release date: 12 June 1975
- Running time: 110 minutes
- Country: Mexico
- Language: Spanish

El valle de los miserables (English: The valley of the miserable) is a 1975 Mexican drama film. Based in the novel El Valle Nacional by Enrique Albuerne.

== Synopsis ==
In 1909, the former Judge Cristobal Zamarripa Zamarripa is the owner of the Valle Nacional, the a plantation where snuff exploits workers, supported by the tyrant Porfirio Díaz, who sends political prisoners as slaves. Others are engaged with the promise of high wages, but end up owing all to the company store. All are tortured, raped or killed when they protest. Another rancher (whose brother was killed by Zamarripa), will be punished, but flees and becomes revolutionary. The Zamarripa minions betray each other and they flee of the revolutionaries, led by fugitive landowner. The prisoners, upon release, massacred all the Zamarripa family.

== Cast ==
- Mario Almada ... Don Cristobal Zamarripa
- Ana Luisa Peluffo ... Concepción Zamarripa
- Silvia Mariscal ... Margarita Zamarripa
- Alma Muriel ... Marina Guzmán
- Fernando Almada ... Verduguillo
- Ricardo Carrión ... Dr. Felipe Álvarez
- Marianne Sauvage ... Lydia Zamarripa
- Hugo Stiglitz ... Felipe Aguirre
- Jorge Russek ... Pancracio
- René Cardona ... Don Luis Aguirre
- Roberto "Flaco" Guzmán ... Chico
- Guillermo Álvarez Bianchi ... Don Casimiro
- José Carlos Ruiz ... Tío Chinto
- Fannie Kauffman "Vitola" ... Doña Vírgen
- Farnesio de Bernal ... Sacerdote
- Juan Jose Martínez Casado ... Don Crispín
