= Et hjørne af paradis =

- Theatrical release poster
- English: A Corner of Paradise
- Directed by: Peter Ringgaard
- Written by: John Bernstein; Bob Foss; Peter Ringgaard
- Produced by: Erik Crone
- Starring: Samuel Fröler; Trine Pallesen; John Savage; Miguel Sandoval; Penélope Cruz
- Cinematography: Dirk Brüel
- Edited by: Morten Giese; Leif Axel Kjeldsen
- Music by: George Keller
- Production companies: Nordisk Film; Nosara Productions; Søren Stærmose AB
- Distributed by: EuroArts Entertainment (Germany) (DVD); Prime Time Entertainment (2000) (Netherlands) (VHS)
- Release dates: 29 August 1997 (Denmark); 26 March 1999 (Sweden); 16 February 2005 (Italy (DVD))
- Running time: 109 mins
- Countries: Sweden; Denmark; Costa Rica
- Languages: Spanish; Danish; Swedish

Et hjørne af paradis (transl. A Corner of Paradise, Swedish: En doft av paradiset, Italian: La legge della giungla) is 1997 Swedish romantic-drama film directed by Peter Ringgaard, and starring Samuel Fröler, Trine Pallesen, John Savage, Miguel Sandoval and Penélope Cruz.

== Cast ==
- Samuel Fröler as Nils von Ekelöw
- Trine Pallesen as Anna
- John Savage as Padre Louis
- Miguel Sandoval as Don Diego
- Penélope Cruz as Doña Helena (as Penelope Cruz)
- Ramiro Huerta as Ricardo
- Lennart Hjulström as Carl von Ekelöw
- Björn Granath as Professor Andersson
- Pär Ericson as Professor Rylander
- Pedro Armendáriz Jr. as Minister (as Pedro Armendariz)
- Daniel Martínez as Kaptajn Garcia (as Daniel Martinez)
- Jesús Ochoa as Scarface (as Jesus Ochoa)
- Damián Delgado as Indian (as Damian Delgado)
- Carmen Delgado as Kvinde
- Andrea Sisniega as Sekretær
- Óscar Castañeda as Mestis (as Oscar Castaneda)
- Jorge Becerril as Rig Sanger
- Abel Woolrich as Fattig Sanger
- Leif Forstenberg as Majoren
- Lia Boysen as Svensk pige til dans
