= Cumbres Borrascosas (1979 TV series) =

- Genre: Telenovela
- Created by: Emily Brontë (Novel); Arturo Schoening (Adaptation)
- Directed by: Ernesto Alonso; Tony Carbajal
- Starring: Alma Muriel; Gonzalo Vega
- Country of origin: Mexico
- Original language: Spanish
- No. of episodes: 20

Production
- Executive producer: Ernesto Alonso
- Cinematography: Karlos Velázquez

Original release
- Network: Canal de las Estrellas
- Release: 1979

Related
- Cumbres Borrascosas (1963); Cumbres Borrascosas (1964); Cumbres Borrascosas (1976)

Cumbres Borrascosas is a Mexican telenovela, produced by Ernesto Alonso for Televisa in 1979. It is based on the 1847 novel by Emily Brontë, Wuthering Heights

== Cast ==
- Alma Muriel as Cathy
- Gonzalo Vega as Heathcliff
- Bertha Moss
- Rocío Brambila
- Mario Casillas
- Karina Duprez
- Arturo Benavides
- Juan Antonio Edwards
- Sergio Jiménez
- Alfonso Iturralde
- José Bardina
