= Abel Woolrich =

Mexican actor

Abel Woolrich (/ˈwʊlrɪtʃ/ WUUL-ritch; 1947–2006) was a Mexican character actor. Son of the painter Fanny Rabel, brother of the Mexican actress Paloma Woolrich and nephew of Malkah Rabell.

== Acting career ==
His career spanned over thirty years of Mexican cinema, including films such as Mujeres salvajes and El callejón de los milagros; in addition, he had small parts in a few Hollywood movies such as Solo, The Mask of Zorro, Apocalypto, Ravenous and My Family.

=== Apocalypto and death ===
Woolrich had one scene in Mel Gibson's 2006 Mayan language film Apocalypto, but he died before the movie was released; as a result the movie is dedicated "In Remembrance of Abel."

== Selected filmography ==
- National Mechanics (1972) - Motociclista
- Apolinar (1972)
- México, México, ra ra ra (1976)
- Chin chin el Teporocho (1976)
- Cuartelazo (1977) - Capitán
- Flores de papel (1978)
- Nuevo mundo (1978)
- Adios David (1979)
- Broken Flag (1979) - Enrique Olivares
- Para usted jefa (1980) - El chupamirto
- El infierno de todos tan temido (1981) - Alberto
- El corazón de la noche (1984) - Hombre joven
- Mujeres salvajes (1984) - Pablo a Camper
- Toy Soldiers (1984) - Pedro
- Memoriales perdidos (1985)
- Los náufragos del Liguria (1985) - Marino Albizetti
- Los piratas (1986) - Marino Albizetti
- ¿Cómo ves? (1986)
- The Mosquito Coast (1986) - Mercenary
- The Realm of Fortune (1986) - Padrino
- Va de Nuez (1986)
- Camino largo a Tijuana (1988) - Paco
- Romero (1989) - Campesino
- Old Gringo (1989) - Tall Soldier
- Cabeza de Vaca (1991) - Shipwrecked Man
- Pure Luck (1991) - Prisoner
- Gertrudis (1992) - Margaito
- The Harvest (1992) - Toothless Local
- Dama de noche (1993) - Pescador poeta
- The Beginning and the End (1993) - Afanador
- Dollar Mambo (1993) - The Drunkard
- La ultima batalla (1993) - Papa De Pablo
- La orilla de la tierra (1994) - Fisico
- Ámbar (1994) - Marinero Polaco I
- Dos crímenes (1994) - Colorado
- My Family (1995) - Oxcart Driver
- El Callejón de los Milagros (1995) - Zacarías
- Solo (1996) - Lazaro
- Et hjørne af paradis (1997) - Fattig Sanger
- Perdita Durango (1997) - Old Man in Cemetery
- Me llaman Madrina (1997)
- The Mask of Zorro (1998) - Ancient Zorro
- Ravenous (1999) - Borracho
- Before Night Falls (2000) - Hungry Inmate
- De la calle (2001) - Félix
- El gavilán de la sierra (2002) - Meliton Merez
- Vampires: Los Muertos (2002) - Beggar
- Don de Dios (2005) - El Loco
- Apocalypto (2006) - Laughing man
