= La culpa (TV series) =

- Genre: Telenovela; Romance; Drama
- Directed by: Heriberto López de Anda
- Starring: Tiaré Scanda; Raúl Araiza; Manuel Ojeda; Alma Muriel; Paula Sánchez; Pedro Armendáriz, Jr. Delia Casanova
- Opening theme: Amor Total by Emmanuel
- Country of origin: Mexico
- Original language: Spanish
- No. of episodes: 45

Production
- Executive producer: Yuri Breña
- Producer: Pinkye Morris
- Production locations: Filming; Televisa San Ángel; Mexico City, Mexico
- Running time: 41-44 minutes
- Production company: Televisa

Original release
- Network: Canal de las Estrellas
- Release: August 12 – October 11, 1996

Related
- The guilt (1996)

La culpa ('The Guilt') is a Mexican telenovela produced by Yuri Breña and Pinkye Morris for Televisa. It premiered on Canal de las Estrellas on August 12, 1996 and ended on October 11, 1996.

Tiaré Scanda and Raúl Araiza starred as protagonists, while the leading actors Manuel Ojeda and Pedro Armendariz, Jr. starred as antagonists. Alma Muriel starred as stellar performances.

== Plot ==
Isabel, adopted daughter of Mariano and Andrea Lagarde, meets Miguel, son of a former boxing champion, middle class but with a bright future. The two fall madly in love, but Miguel is involved in the accident in which Juana Inés, Isabel's sister, dies and Mariano tries to destroy the young man to do justice.

Miguel and Isabel will be forced to leave behind their love and loyalty towards their parents to find the real culprit.

== Cast ==
- Tiaré Scanda as Isabel Lagarde
- Raúl Araiza as Miguel Nava
- Manuel Ojeda as Mariano Lagarde
- Alma Muriel as Andrea Lagarde
- Paula Sánchez as Juana Inés Lagarde
- Pedro Armendáriz, Jr. as Tomás Mendizábal
- Delia Casanova as Graciela
- Julieta Egurrola as Irma
- Manuel "Flaco" Ibáñez as Raúl Nava
- Ana Martín as Cuquita Mendizábal
- Alfonso Iturralde as Rafael Montalvo
- Mario Iván Martínez as Dr. Castellar
- Bruno Bichir as Adolfo Mendizábal
- Gabriela Araujo as Miriam
- Germán Gutiérrez as Víctor
- Zaide Silvia Gutiérrez as Nemoria
- Evangelina Sosa as Paty
- Tina Romero as Lorena
- Alicia Montoya as Manuela
- Juan Verduzco as Director of University
- Ivette Proal as Edith
- Gabriela Platas as Blanca
- Mauricio Aspe as Toño
- Zoraida Gómez as Ceci
- Eric del Castillo as Lic. Yllades
- Luis Reynoso as Justino
- Evelyn Solares as Nemoria'a neighbor
- Marco Antonio Zetina as Dr. de la Fuente
- Carlos Ramírez as Lic. Marín
- Tony Marcin as Connie
- Eduardo Cáceres as Molina
- Floribel Alejandre as Queta
- Evangelina Martínez as Mother Elvira
- Adriana Barraza as Social worker
- Jeanette Candiani
