= The Divine Caste =

- Directed by: Julián Pastor
- Written by: Eduardo Luján
- Starring: Ignacio López Tarso; Ana Luisa Peluffo; Pedro Armendáriz Jr.
- Cinematography: José Ortiz Ramos
- Edited by: José W. Bustos
- Music by: Joaquín Gutiérrez Heras
- Production companies: Corporación Nacional Cinematográfica; Dasa Films
- Release date: 17 November 1977
- Running time: 120 minutes
- Country: Mexico
- Language: Spanish

The Divine Caste (Spanish: La casta divina) is a 1977 Mexican historical drama film directed by Julián Pastor and starring Ignacio López Tarso, Ana Luisa Peluffo and Pedro Armendáriz Jr. The film is set in Yucatán around the time of the Mexican Revolution and portrays the social upheaval following General Salvador Alvarado's arrival in the area.

== Cast ==
- Ignacio López Tarso as Don Wilfrido
- Ana Luisa Peluffo as Tulita
- Pedro Armendáriz Jr. as Abel Ortiz Argumedo
- Tina Romero as Elidé
- Jorge Martínez de Hoyos as General Salvador Alvarado
- Sergio Calderón as Padre Chano
- René Cardona as Consul Cubano
- Roberto Dumont as Teniente Máximo
- Blanca Torres as Doña Amira
- Marissa Maynez as Charito
- Miguel Ángel Ferriz as Panelio Peón
- Jorge Balzaretti as Efraín
- Lina Montes as Doña Engracia
- Ignacio Retes as Don Emilio
- José Nájera as Don Nico
- Julio Monterde as Don Gabriel
- César Sobrevals as Crisanto
- Refugio Flores as Gloria
- Sandra Cabargo as Rosa
- Alejandra de la Cruz as Matux
- Beatriz Marín as La Tiple
- León Singer as Don Diego Rendón
- Max Kerlow as Arzobispo de Yucatán
- Martín Palomares as Justino
- Eduardo Ocaña as Moisés
- Jorge Fegán as Don Ambrosio
- Federico Castillo as Carlos
- Alicia García as Niña Maya
- Wilberto Herrera as Carretero viejo
- Fabio Ramírez as Don Alberto
- Celia Acevedo as Tomasa
- Neyda Vargas as Chana
- Alfredo Novelo as Dr. Rosales
- Erica Mireles as Del Carmen
- Silvia Manríquez as Claudette
- Carlos Aguilar as General Jara
- Mário Herrera as Soldado
- Manolo del Río as Borracho
- Joaquín Cortez as Artesano
- Roberto Obregon as Professor
- Hernando Herrera as Empresario
- Gualberto Trejo as Bohemio I
- Sergio Duarte as Bohemio II

== Bibliography ==
- Mora, Carl J. Mexican Cinema: Reflections of a Society, 1896-2004. McFarland & Co, 2005.
