= Sergio Klainer =

Argentine-Mexican actor

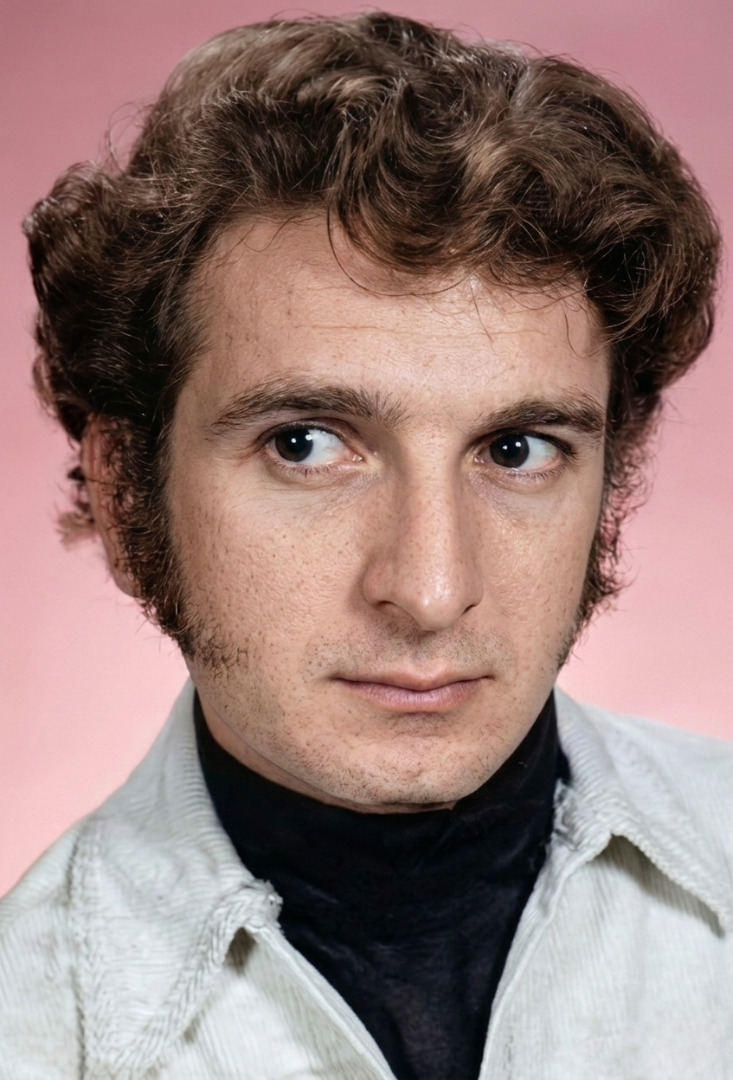
- Sergio Klainerin 1963
- Born: 23 March 1939 (age 87); Buenos Aires, Argentina
- Occupation: Actor
- Years active: 1957–present

Sergio Klainer (born 23 March 1939), also credited as Sergio Kleiner, is an Argentine-Mexican film and television actor.

== Career ==
He started his acting career at the age of 21 at a play in Buenos Aires. He then toured with the theater company to Central America and Mexico where he obtained a role in Los padres terribles of Jean Cocteau the following year (1962).

In 1968, he obtained his first roles in telenovelas in Mujeres sin amor and Juventud divino tesoro both with Irma Lozano. The same year he obtained his first starring role in Fando y Lis, a film by Alejandro Jodorowsky. Three years later he participated in the classic La generala starred by María Félix. In 1984, he played a doctor in "Ya nunca más" one of the films starred by singer Luis Miguel. He would spend the next decade acting in Televisa when in 1998, he moved to rival network TV Azteca to act in La casa del naranjo and six more telenovelas in the next seven years.

In 2005, he returned to film with the movie Morirse está en Hebreo.

== Filmography ==
=== Films ===
- Morirse está en Hebreo (2005) as Moishe
- Ni de aquí, ni de allá (1988) as a spy
- Ya nunca más (1984) as a doctor
- Barrio de campeones (1981)
- Bloody Marlene (1979) as McCutchen's son
- Cinco mil dolares de recompensa (1974)
- Los doce malditos (1974)
- Fin de fiesta (1972) as Luis
- Apolinar (1972)
- The Incredible Invasion (1971) as an alien
- Mictlan/La casa de los que ya no son (1969)
- Las reglas del juego (1971) as El Güero
- Siempre hay una primera vez (segment Isabel, 1971)
- La generala (1971) as El rubio
- Fando y Lis (1968) as Fando

=== Stage ===
- Rainman (2010)
- Mi querida familia
- La malquerida
- Una esfingue llamada cordelia
- Soledad para cuatro
- Viento en las ramas del sasafras
- El presidente mañoso
- El gesticulador
- La vida es sueño
- La ronda de la hechizada
- Los dolores
- El pájaro azul
- Los padres terribles (1962)

=== Television ===
- La rosa de Guadalupe (2016) as Felipe
- Tanto Amor (2015) as Óscar Lombardo
- La Otra Cara del Alma (2012-2013) as Padre Ernesto
- La Mujer de Judas (2011-2012) as Buenaventura Briceño
- Cielo Rojo (2011) as Ángel Durán
- Entre el Amor y el Deseo (2010) as Sergio
- Quiéreme Tonto (2010)
- Ni una vez más (2005)
- Amor en Custodia (2005) as Santiago Achaval Urien
- Te amaré en silencio (2003) as Arsenio
- La hija del jardinero (2003) as Lic. Ordóñez
- Golpe bajo (2000) as Gonzalo Montaño
- El amor no es como lo pintan (2000) as Manuel Segovia
- Catalina y Sebastian (1999) as Gustavo Negrete
- La casa del naranjo (1998)
- Salud, dinero y amor (1997) as Dr. Damián Zárate
- Canción de amor (1996)
- Más allá del puente (1994) as Adrián
- De frente al sol (1992) as Adrián
- Muchachitas (1991) as Alberto
- Alcanzar una estrella (1990) as Fernando
- Dulce desafío (1989)
- Seducción (1986)
- Eclipse (1984) as Atilio Greco
- Elisa (1979)
- Lucia Sombra (1971) as Aaron Siavinski
- Mi amor por ti (1969)
- Los caudillos (1968) as Count Pablo Jovellanos
- Juventud divino tesoro (1968)
- Mujeres sin amor (1968)

== See also ==
- Foreign-born artists in Mexico
