= Santa (TV series) =

- Genre: Telenovela
- Created by: Federico Gamboa; Luis Reyes de la Maza
- Directed by: Luis Vega
- Starring: Tina Romero; Manuel Ojeda
- Opening theme: "Balada para Adelina" by Richard Clayderman
- Country of origin: Mexico
- Original language: Spanish

Production
- Executive producer: Irene Sabido
- Cinematography: Miguel Sabido

Original release
- Network: Canal de las Estrellas
- Release: 1978

Santa is a Mexican telenovela produced by Irene Sabido for Canal de las Estrellas in 1978.

== Cast ==
- Tina Romero as Santa
- Manuel Ojeda as Federico Gamboa
- Sergio Jiménez as Hipolito
- Alicia Palacios as Elvira
- Luis Miranda as Jarameño
- Rosenda Monteros as La Gaditana
- Mario Casillas as Ceferino
- Margarita Sanz
- Magda Guzmán
- Arturo Beristáin
- Dina de Marco
