= Yo Soy (Mariana Ochoa album) =

Studio album by Mariana Ochoa
- Released: September 3, 2004
- Recorded: The WareHouse Studios (North Miami, Florida) 2003–2004
- Genre: Pop, dance-pop, teen pop
- Length: 37:06
- Language: Spanish
- Label: EMI Music
- Producer: Pepvert, Gustavo Menendez

Mariana Ochoa chronology
Yo Soy (2004)	Luna Llena (2007)

Yo Soy (In English "I Am") is the debut album by Mexican singer-songwriter Mariana Ochoa, released by EMI Music in Mexico on September 3, 2004. It was produced by Jay Jay for Murlyn Music AB, Pepvert for The Pop Garage and Gustavo Menendez. It sold more than 50,000 copies in Mexico.

== Track listing ==
1. "Yo Soy" - 3:57
2. "Qué Importa" - 4:22
3. "My Lover" - 3:12
4. "Deseos" - 3:45
5. "Ojos Sinceros" - 4:12
6. "Muere Por Mi" - 3:14
7. "Acércate Más" - 3:22
8. "Tan Enamorada" - 3:53
9. "Cara y Cruz" - 3:19
10. "Butterflies" - 3:35

== Singles ==
Year	Single
2004	"My Lover"
2004	"Deseos"
2005	"Qué Importa"

== Tour ==
In 2004 and 2005, Ochoa was released a tour to support her first album, Yo Soy, it was released in many states of Mexico and to close her tour, she was a concert in the Teatro Metropolitan with 3,000 persons of audience.
