= Luna Llena (album) =

Studio album by Mariana Ochoa
- Released: September 21, 2007
- Studios: After Hours Studio (Los Angeles, California) 2006–2007
- Genre: Pop
- Length: 45:09
- Language: Spanish
- Label: Warner Music
- Producer: Rafael Sardina

Mariana Ochoa chronology
Yo Soy (2004)	Luna Llena (2007)

Luna Llena (In English: Full Moon) is the second album by Mexican singer-songwriter Mariana Ochoa, released by Warner Music in Mexico on September 21, 2007.

The album was produced by Rafael Sardina and directed by Cheche Alara, and recorded in Los Angeles, California.

== Track listing ==
1. "Volvamos a Intentar" (Klaus Derendorf/Tom Nichols/Patrice Tipoki)
2. "Me Faltas Tú"
3. "Invisible"
4. "Aunque No Estés" (Featuring Alex Ubago)
5. "Pretendes" (Klaus Derendorf/Tom Nichols/Jeeve)
6. "Te Extraño Tanto"
7. "Luna Llena"
8. "Por Siempre" (Klaus Derendorf/Tom Nichols/Jeeve)
9. "Amor Total" (Tobias Gustavsson/Mia Bergström)
10. "Con tu Amor"
11. "Decide o Vete"
12. "Amar sin Miedo" (Por Él)

== Singles ==
1. "Me Faltas Tú"

== Credits ==
- Vocals by Mariana Ochoa
- Drums by Victor Indrizzo
- Drums in "Me Faltas Tú" and "Te Extraño Tanto" by Simon Phillips
- Bass by Sean Hurley
- Guitars by Fran Iturbe
- Additional guitars by Paulo Serpa
- Keyboards by Cheche Alara
- Percussion by Rafa Padilla
- Additional vocals by Edgar Cortazar y Ximena Muñoz
