= ¿Por qué nací mujer? =

- Directed by: Rogelio A. González
- Starring: Sara García
- Release date: 1970
- Country: Mexico
- Language: Spanish

¿Por qué nací mujer? ("Why was i born a woman?") is a 1970 Mexican film. It stars Sara García.

== Cast ==
- Sara García as Doña Rosario
- Andrés Soler as Don Teodoro
- Prudencia Grifell as Doña Rosa
- José Gálvez as Pedro
- Ofelia Guilmáin as Carmela
- Ana Martín as Santa
- Pilar Pellicer as Josefa
- Gilberto Román as Francisco
- Alma Muriel as Luisa
- Michel Strauss as Armando
- Víctor Junco as Tio Gaston
- Magda Guzmán as Aunt Ernestina
- Marta Yolanda González as Tia Tacha
- Patricia Morán as Tia Doro
- David Estuardo as Aunt Doro's son
- Gonzalo Vega as Hernan
- Sara Guasch as Sara
- Flor de María as La Novia
- Jorge Patiño as Aunt Tacha's Husband
- Sergio Virell as José
- Rogelio A. González as Don Diego
- Carmen Montejo
