= Alma Muriel =

Mexican actress (1951–2014)

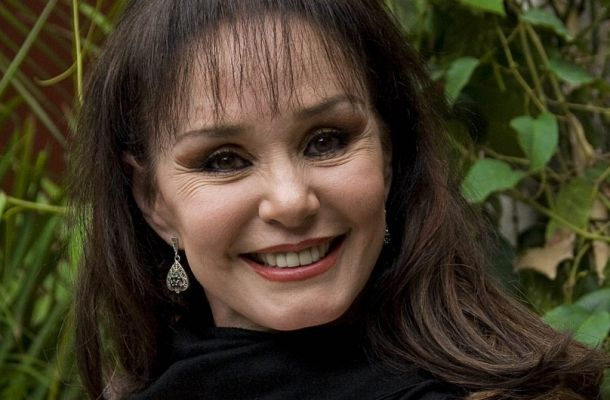
- Muriel, c. 2010s
- Born: Alma Muriel del Sordo; 20 October 1951; Mexico City, Mexico
- Died: 5 January 2014 (aged 62); Playa del Carmen, Quintana Roo, Mexico
- Occupation: Actress
- Years active: 1969-2013

Alma Muriel del Sordo (20 October 1951 – 5 January 2014), known artistically as Alma Muriel, was a Mexican actress who appeared in plays, films, and telenovelas, best known for her role as Irene del Conde / Lucrecia Treviño in Televisa's telenovela El extraño retorno de Diana Salazar (1988).

Muriel died from a heart attack on 5 January 2014, aged 62, in Playa del Carmen, Quintana Roo.

== Filmography ==
=== Telenovelas ===
Year	Title	Role	Notes	Ref.
1972	La señora joven	Luisa Padilla	Supporting Role	
1974	Ha llegado una intrusa	Nelly Carvajal	Supporting Role	
1975	Ven conmigo	Bárbara	Main Antagonist	
1975	Pobre Clara	Susana	Antagonist	
1977-78	Marcha nupcial	Mary Lola	Protagonist	
1979	Añoranza	Unknown role		
1979	Yara	Leticia	Main Antagonist	
1979	Cumbres Borrascosas	Cathy	Protagonist	
1980-81	Al rojo vivo	Liliana	Protagonist	
1982-83	Vivir enamorada	Estela	Protagonist	
1984	Principessa	Fernanda Montenegro (#2)	Protagonist	
1984-85	Los años felices	Eva	Protagonist	
1987	Cómo duele callar	Aurelia	Antagonist	
1988-89	El extraño retorno de Diana Salazar	Irene del Conde / Lucrecia Treviño	Main Antagonist	
1989	Las grandes aguas	Lena de Rivas / Yolanda	Protagonist	
1990	Yo compro esa mujer	Matilde Montes de Oca	Main Antagonist	
1991-92	Atrapada	Luisa	Supporting Role	
1995	Si Dios me quita la vida	Eva de Sánchez Amaro / Eva de Hernández	Main Antagonist	
1996	Azul	Elena Curi	Supporting Role	
1996	La culpa	Andrea Lagarde	Supporting Role	
1997-98	Desencuentro	Valentina Quintana de Rivera	Supporting Role	
1999	Nunca te olvidaré	Consuelo Del Valle de Uribe	Main Antagonist	
2001	El noveno mandamiento	Clara Durán de Villanueva	Antagonist	
2003-04	Mariana de la Noche	Isabel Montenegro	Supporting Role	
2005	La esposa virgen	Mercedes	Special participation	
2006-07	Amar sin límites	Leonarda Galván	Antagonist	
2007	Destilando Amor	Public ministry	Special participation	
2008	Fuego en la sangre	Soledad	Special participation	

=== Films ===
Year	Title	Role	Notes	Ref.
1970	¿Por qué nací mujer?	Luisa		
1972	National Mechanics	Rosarito		
1975	El valle de los miserables	Marina Guzmán		
1979	Amor libre	Julie		

== Awards and nominations ==
=== Premios TVyNovelas ===
Year	Category	Telenovela	Result
1989	Best Antagonist Actress	El extraño retorno de Diana Salazar	Nominated
1991	Best Antagonist Actress	Yo compro esa mujer	Nominated
2000	Best Antagonist Actress	Nunca te olvidaré	Nominated
