= Mariana Ochoa =

Mexican singer and actress (born 1979)

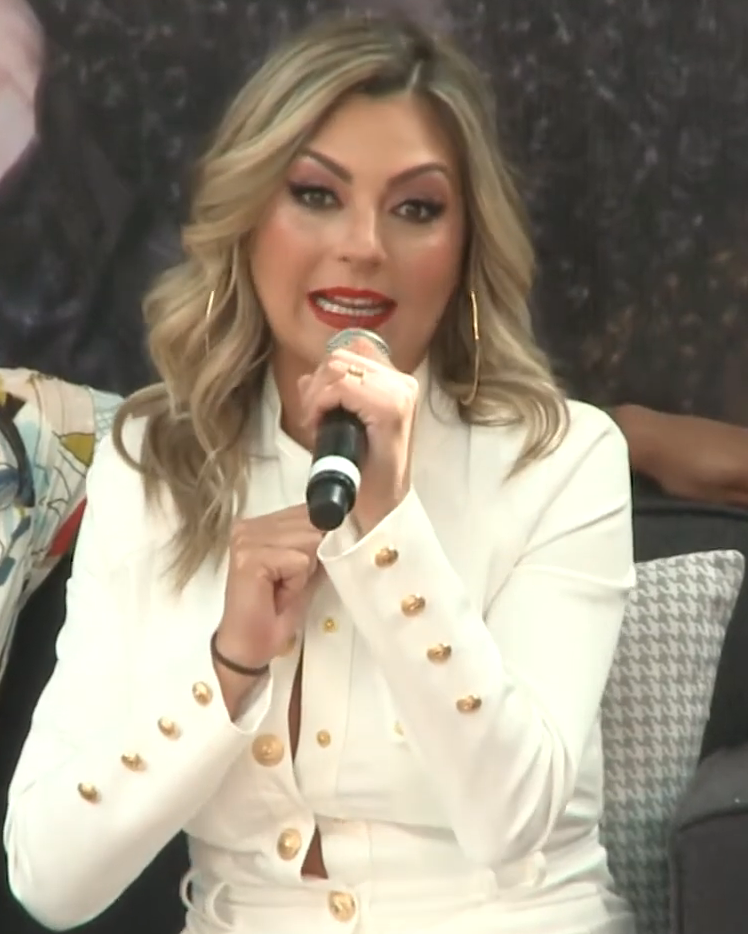
- Ochoa in 2020

Background information
- Born: Mariana Yolanda Ochoa Reyes; February 19, 1979 (age 46)
- Origin: Mexico City, Mexico
- Genres: pop, rock
- Occupations: Singer, actress
- Years active: 1989–present
- Labels: EMI, Warner Bros. Records
- Website: soymarianaochoa.com

Mariana Yolanda Ochoa Reyes (born February 19, 1979, in Mexico City) is a Mexican singer and actress.

== Music career ==
She was a member of the musical group La Onda Vaselina, who were one of the most successful pop bands of Mexico, OV7. She stayed in the group until they dissolved in 2003. After OV7 was eventually dissolved, Mariana began dedicating herself to acting and singing.

== Acting career ==
Ochoa's first major role was in the soap opera La Hija del Jardinero (2003–2004), a TV Azteca production. The soap opera was well received in Latin America.

Mariana did another major role in Amor Sin Condiciones, a remake of the successful soap opera Secreto de Amor which was produced in 2001 by Venevisión and Fonovideo in Miami.

In 2007, Ochoa appeared in the series Se Busca un Hombre.

== Filmography ==
Television performance
Year	Title	Roles	Notes
2003	La Hija del Jardinero	Luisa Fernanda Pérez	Main role
2004–2005	La vida es una canción	Mariana	2 episodes
2005	Lo que callamos las mujeres	Mariana	Episode: "Luz y sombra"
2005	Top models	Paloma Valencia / Mariana San Martín	Main role
2006	Amor sin condiciones	María Claudia	Main role
2007	Se Busca Un Hombre	Samantha	Series regular
2021	Tic Tac Toc: El reencuentro	Taís	Main role
2022	Esta historia me suena	Gema	Episode: "Shabadabada"

== Discography ==
=== Studio albums ===
Title	Details
Yo Soy	Released: September 3, 2004; Label: EMI; Format: CD, download digital
Luna Llena	Released: September 21, 2007; Label: Warner Music; Format: CD, download digital

=== OV7 discography ===
- 1989: La Onda Vaselina
- 1990: Susanita Tiene Un Raton
- 1991: La Onda Vaselina 2
- 1992: Dulces Para Ti
- 1993: La Banda Rock
- 1995: Hoy
- 1997: Entrega Total
- 1998: Vuela Mas Alto
- 2000: CD00
- 2001: En Directo Rush
- 2001: Siete Latidos
- 2003: Punto

Ochoa released one studio album on EMI (Yo Soy) in 2004 and one studio album on Warner Music (Luna Llena) in 2007.

In March 2006, Ochoa change of label company with Warner Music by ten years to recorded her next albums. In July, 2007, Ochoa record her second studio album named Luna Llena.

== Singles ==
Year	Single	Album
2004	"My Lover"	Yo Soy
2004	"Deseos"	Yo Soy
2005	"Qué Importa"	Yo Soy
2005	"One Love (feat. Blue)"	Guilty (Mexican edition)
2007	"Me Faltas Tú"	Luna Llena
