= Tic Tac Toc: El reencuentro =

- Genre: Comedy
- Starring: Pierre Angelo; Reynaldo Rossano; Carlos Espejel; Mariana Ochoa; Lisset; Alejandro Suárez; Héctor Sandarti
- Country of origin: Mexico
- Original language: Spanish
- No. of seasons: 1
- No. of episodes: 12

Production
- Executive producer: Reynaldo López
- Production company: Televisa

Original release
- Network: Las Estrellas
- Release: 12 April – 28 June 2021

Tic Tac Toc: El reencuentro is a Mexican comedy television series that premiered on Las Estrellas on 12 April 2021. The series is produced by Reynaldo López. It stars Pierre Angelo, Reynaldo Rossano, Carlos Espejel, Mariana Ochoa, Lisset, Alejandro Suárez, and Héctor Sandarti. The series revolves around a popular musical group from the 1980s that seek to repeat their success 35 years later. Production of the series began on 17 March 2021.

== Plot ==
Tic Tac Toc was a children's music group that was famous and successful in the 1980s and, 35 years later, decide to organize a reunion. Natalia, Pierre, Reynaldo and Carlos at first join forces to raise funds to support one of their members who is in need of a surgical procedure. However, each member has their dark secrets and quiet goals that they intend to achieve through this reunion. Together they will try to regain the brilliance and success they had 35 years ago, while the fraudulent businessman Tito Gambino will try to exploit them for his own gain.

== Cast ==
- Pierre Angelo as Pierre
- Reynaldo Rossano as Reynaldo
- Carlos Espejel as Carlos
- Mariana Ochoa as Taís
- Lisset as Natalia
- Alejandro Suárez as Tito Gambino
- Héctor Sandarti as Gerardo

== Episodes ==
No.	Title	Original release date
1	"El Reencuentro"	12 April 2021
35 years after achieving great success in the 80's with the musical group Tic Tac Toc, Pierre, Carlos and Natalia join Reynaldo to help him raise funds for a surgical procedure.
2	"El jingle"	19 April 2021
Tito Gambino tells Pierre, Carlos, Reynaldo and Natalia that they must record a jingle with the help of Claudio Yarto. No one wants to do it, but there is a contract involved.
3	"Sexting"	26 April 2021
Natalia tries to revive the flame of passion with her husband, Reynaldo advises her to send sexy videos, but one of these ends up in Carlos' hands, unleashing a whole mess.
4	"Destino Final"	3 May 2021
Reynaldo believes that his life is in danger, because of a superstition due to an old photograph, which would indicate that he would be the second to die. Pierre wants to put on a play of Grease.
5	"Novia Peligrosa"	10 May 2021
Don Tito gets the group to appear on a television show, but first they must have their playback ready. Isabella wants to formalize her relationship with Carlos, but he discovers something scary.
6	"La Cornisa"	17 May 2021
Carlos gets stuck on the ledge of his window. Pierre makes the press believe that Carlos wants to kill himself instead of helping him. Reynaldo loses his memory and Natalia and Tito try to help him recover it.
7	"El Lanzamiento"	24 May 2021
Carlos is worried about paying the rent for his school, but Don Tito has the idea of launching "Tic Tac Toc" there in the middle of a quinceañera party.
8	"La Candidata"	31 May 2021
Don Tito convinces the Tic Tac Toc group to support the candidate Mimí Galván in the presentation of her campaign, but she turns out to be a famous ex-friend who everyone hates.
9	"Cambio de look"	7 June 2021
Don Tito wants to change the image of Tic tac toc, so he hires image designer Edy Smol. The group celebrates Reynaldo's birthday by bringing in magician Rody as a surprise.
10	"El Santuario"	14 June 2021
Carlos prepares his apartment for a romantic date with Maya, but is interrupted by all the members of Tic Tac Toc and other people.
11	"San Canuto"	21 June 2021
Tito Gambino gets the group a performance in San Canuto, but Leobardo, the town mayor and friend of Tito, is said to be a stalker.
12	"La Gira"	28 June 2021
Taís returns with his former bandmates and offers them a tour, at first they are not very convinced, but the concert with Kabah turns out to be a success.
