= Yara (TV series) =

- Genre: Telenovela
- Created by: Marissa Garrido
- Directed by: Alfredo Saldaña
- Starring: Angélica María; Jaime Moreno; Alma Muriel; Eric del Castillo
- Theme music composer: Raúl Vale
- Opening theme: "Mi amor prohibido" by Angélica María
- Country of origin: Mexico
- Original language: Spanish
- No. of episodes: 75

Production
- Executive producer: Ernesto Alonso
- Production company: Televisa

Original release
- Network: Canal de las Estrellas
- Release: March 12 – October 12, 1979

Related
- Viviana; Los ricos también lloran

Yara, is a Mexican telenovela produced by Ernesto Alonso for Televisa in 1979. Starring by Angélica María, Jaime Moreno, Alma Muriel and Eric del Castillo.

== Cast ==
- Angélica María as Yara
- Alma Muriel
- Jaime Moreno as Eladio
- Blanca Guerra as Regina
- Miguel Manzano
- Carlos Ancira
- Rosa María Moreno as Amelia
- Sergio Ramos as El Cachetes
- Juan Peláez
- Aurora Clavell as Sabina
- Eric del Castillo as Juan Carlos
- Sergio Gómez
- Roberto Antunez as Liborio
- Ignacio Rubiell
- Rossy Mendoza as Rossy
- Frank Moro as Mauricio
- Manuel Guizar
- Guillermo Gil
- Fausto Fierro
- Gustavo del Castillo
- Tito Duran
- Laura León
- Graciela Doring
- Guillermo Zarur
