= Mujeres salvajes =

- Directed by: Gabriel Retes
- Starring: Tina Romero; Patricia Mayer
- Release date: 1984
- Country: Mexico

Mujeres salvajes (translated as either Savage/Wild Women) is a 1984 Mexican exploitation film directed by Gabriel Retes.

The story is about a group of women who escape a prison in search for a treasure at a beach. On that beach, there are some male campers who discover their secret and torture one of them for information about the treasure. Some of the stars are Tina Romero and Patricia Mayer.
