= Acapulco Film Festival =

The Acapulco Film Festival (Reseña Mundial de Cine de Acapulco) was a film festival held in Acapulco, Mexico, annually from 1959 to 1968 and once more in 1987, with a precursor event held in Mexico City in 1958. The festival showcased both Mexican and international films, and in its heyday attracted an array of entertainment industry figures, particularly those from Hollywood in the United States, as well as European cinema. An unrelated film festival, the Festival Internacional de Cine de Acapulco, or FICA, was founded in Acapulco in 2006.
