= La viuda negra (film) =

La Viuda Negra
- Directed by: Arturo Ripstein
- Written by: Vicente Armendáriz; Francisco del Villar; Rafael Solana
- Produced by: Francisco del Villar
- Starring: Isela Vega; Mario Almada
- Cinematography: Jorge Stahl Jr.
- Edited by: Rafael Ceballos
- Music by: Miguel Pous; Luis Arcaráz
- Release date: 1977
- Running time: 78 minutes
- Country: Mexico
- Language: Spanish

La Viuda Negra (The Black Widow) is a 1977 Mexican drama film directed by Arturo Ripstein, produced in Mexico and based on the novel Debiera haber obispas by Rafael Solana.

== Cast ==
- Isela Vega as Matea
- Mario Almada as Padre Feliciano
- Sergio Jiménez as The Doctor
- Hilda Aguirre as Úrsula

== Plot ==
In a small town in Mexico, Matea (Isela Vega) is an orphan who assists the priest, Father Feliciano (Mario Almada), in his parish. The village doctor tries to seduce her, but fails and proceeds to defame her into believing that Matea maintains relations with the priest. The people believe him and demand that the priest fire her; he refuses and locks himself away with Matea. During the lockdown, they develop a passionate love, but fate arrives and the priest dies. Matea becomes a kind of priestess which is known as the "Black Widow".

== Production ==
The production and release of the film was delayed for six years due to Catholic opposition to the film.
