= Guillermo Arriaga =

Mexican screenwriter and film director

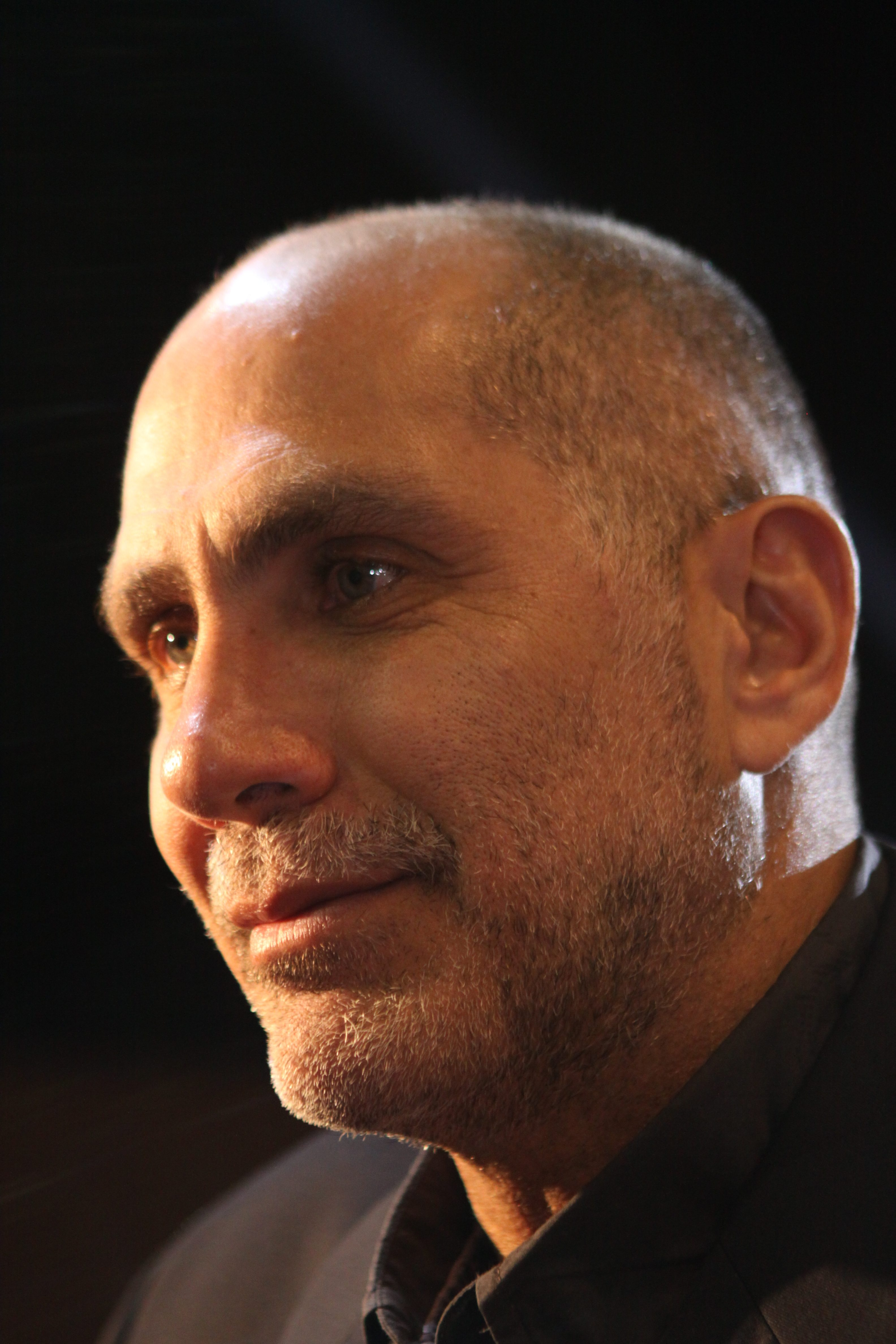
- Guillermo Arriaga, March 2009
- Born: 13 March 1958 (age 68); Mexico City, Mexico
- Other name: Guillermo Arriaga Jordán
- Occupations: Screenwriter, author, director, producer
- Years active: 1991–present

Guillermo Arriaga Jordán (Spanish pronunciation: [ɡiˈʎeɾmo aˈrjaɣa]; born 13 March 1958) is a Mexican novelist, screenwriter, director and producer. Self-defined as "a hunter who works as a writer," he is best known for his Academy Award for Best Original Screenplay and BAFTA Award for Best Original Screenplay nominations for Babel and his screenplay for The Three Burials of Melquiades Estrada, which received the 2005 Cannes Best Screenplay Award.

== Early life ==
Arriaga was born on 13 March 1958 in Mexico City. At the age of 13, he lost his sense of smell after a brutal street fight that would later serve as inspiration for some of his work. Before engaging in his writing career, Arriaga tried out a variety of jobs and professions, including boxing and playing basketball and professional soccer. He completed a B.A. in Communications and a M.A. in Psychology at the Ibero-American University.

== Career ==
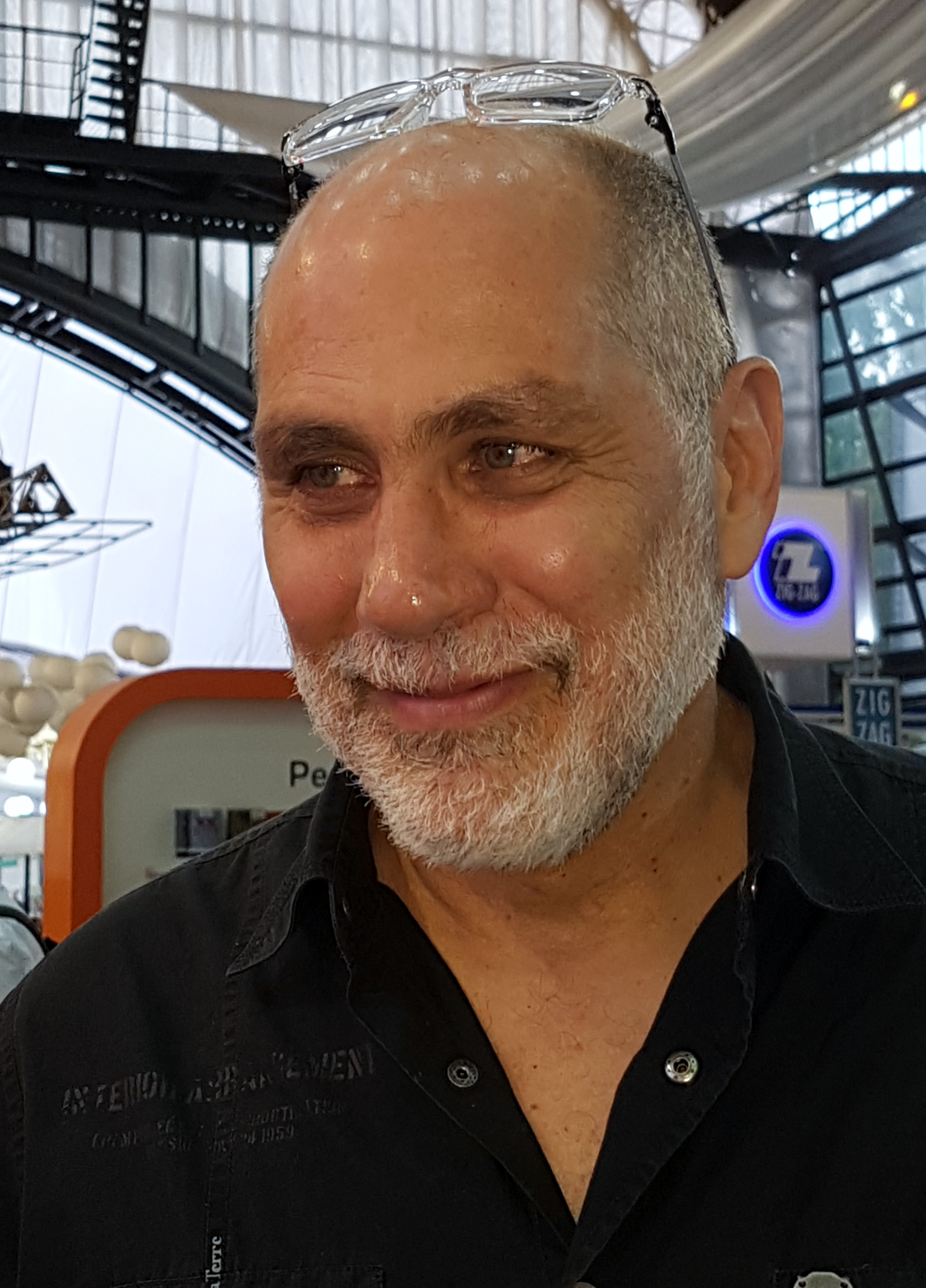
Guillermo Arriaga at the Santiago International Book Fair 2017.

While teaching at the Universidad Iberoamericana, Arriaga met future film director Alejandro González Iñárritu and decided to make a feature length, multiplot film set in Mexico City. The result was Amores Perros (2000). The film received an Oscar nomination for Best Foreign Film as well as a BAFTA Film Award for "Best Film not in the English Language," the "Critics Week Grand Prize" and "Young Critics Award" at the 2000 Cannes Film Festival, as well as many other awards from festivals and societies around the world.

The success of Amores Perros earned Arriaga and Iñárritu an invitation to the U.S. to work on the Universal/Focus Features film 21 Grams, starring Benicio del Toro, Naomi Watts and Sean Penn. Del Toro and Watts received Academy Award nominations for their performances.

González Iñárritu and Arriaga collaborated on a third movie, Babel, to form a trilogy with his first two pictures focusing on the theme of death. However, friction between writer and director led to González Iñárritu banning Arriaga from attending the 2006 Cannes screening of Babel. Nevertheless, González Iñárritu and Arriaga both received Academy Award nominations for their work.

On 19 January 2007, the film adaptation of his book El Búfalo de la Noche directed by Jorge Hernandez Aldana premiered at the Sundance film festival. It features a score by Omar Rodríguez-López of The Mars Volta.

On 29 August 2008, The Burning Plain was premiered at the Venice Film Festival. Arriaga wrote the script and pitched it to American producers, who talked with some directors. Arriaga eventually directed the film, starring Charlize Theron.

Arriaga objects to being called a "guionista" (Spanish for "screenwriter"); he advocates for screenwriters being referred to as "writers" and screenplays being referred to as "works of film." He has clarified that he has no objections to the term's use in English; his issue with "guionista" is that in Spanish the term has the wrong connotations since the word also used to describe people who write tour guidebooks.

In 2011, Mexican producers including Arriaga, Alex Garcia, and Lucas Akoskin unveiled "Heartbeat of the World," an international cinema project with four films tackling topics including religion, sexuality, politics and drug addiction. Each of the four feature films consist of a collaborative set of 10 shorts. The first film in the series—Words with Gods—includes contributions from Arriaga, Emir Kusturica, Brazil's Jose Padilha, Australia's Warwick Thornton, Iran's Bahman Ghobadi, India's Mira Nair, and Japan's Hideo Nakata. The three other films are the "drug-themed Into the Bloodstream; Encounters, a look at sexual identity and expression; and Polis, which delves into political topics." Financing for all four movies have been secured, with each produced in 14 months.

Guillermo Arriaga won the Premio Alfaguara de Novela for his novel, Salvar el fuego on 24 January 2020.

== Non-profit work ==
Since 2005, Guillermo Arriaga has been one of the patrons of DreamAgo, an international screenwriters association.

== Personal life ==
Arriaga is a teetotaler.

== Filmography ==
=== Feature films ===
Year	Film	Director	Writer	Producer	Note
1999	Un Dulce Olor a Muerte	No	Yes	No	
2000	Amores perros	No	Yes	Associate	
2003	21 Grams	No	Yes	Associate	
2005	The Three Burials of Melquiades Estrada	No	Yes	No	Also actor as a bear hunter.
2006	Babel	No	Yes	No	
2007	The Night Buffalo	No	Yes	Yes	
2008	The Burning Plain	Yes	Yes	No	
2014	Rio, I Love You	Segment Director	Segment Writer	No	
2014	Words with Gods	Segment Director	Segment Writer	Segment Producer	
2015	From Afar	No	Yes	Yes	
2016	On the Milky Road	No	No	Executive	
2023	Upon Open Sky	No	Yes	Yes	

=== Short films ===
Year	Film	Director	Writer	Producer	Notes
1987	Campeones Sin Límites	Yes	Yes	No	Documentary short film Also editor
2001	Powder Keg	No	Yes	No	
2004	Los Elefantes Nunca Olvidan	No	No	Yes	
2008	Dusk	No	Yes	Yes	
2010	El Pozo	Yes	Yes	No	
2013	Broken Night	Yes	Yes	No	
2013	Zero Hour	No	Yes	No	
2013	Fin del Mundo	No	No	Executive	
2015	Desde Abajo	Yes	Yes	No	
2015	En defensa propia	No	Yes	No	
2017	Libre de Culpa	No	Yes	No	
2018	B-167-980-098	No	Yes	No	
2019	No One Left Behind	Yes	Yes	Executive	
2019	La Hora Cero	No	Yes	Executive	

== Selected works ==
Year of Publication	Literary work	Genre
2025	El Hombre	Novel
2023	Extrañas	Novel
2020	Salvar el fuego	Novel
2016	El salvaje, Translated as The Untameable by Frank Wynne ISBN 9780857058225	Novel
2007	The Guillotine Squad, translated by Alan Page ISBN 0-7432-9681-8	Novel
2007	A Sweet Scent of Death, translated by Alan Page ISBN 0-7432-9679-6	Novel
2007	Night Buffalo, translated by Alan Page ISBN 0-7432-8186-1	Novel
1999	El Búfalo de la Noche, ISBN 0-7432-8666-9	Novel
1994	Un Dulce Olor a Muerte, ISBN 958-04-6169-4	Novel
1991	Escuadrón Guillotina	Novel
