= Pafnucio Santo =

1977 film

- Directed by: Rafael Corkidi
- Written by: Rafael Corkidi; Carlos Illescas
- Produced by: Rafael Corkidi
- Starring: Pablo Corkidi
- Cinematography: Rafael Corkidi
- Edited by: Ángel Camacho
- Music by: Héctor Sánchez
- Distributed by: Corporación Nacional Cinematográfica
- Release date: 27 October 1977
- Running time: 100 minutes
- Country: Mexico
- Language: Spanish

Pafnucio Santo is a 1977 Mexican drama film directed by Rafael Corkidi. The film was selected as the Mexican entry for the Best Foreign Language Film at the 50th Academy Awards, but was not accepted as a nominee.

== Cast ==
- Juan Barrón as Adán / Jesuscristo / revolucionario
- Pablo Corkidi as Pafnucio
- Susana Kamini as Patricia Hearst
- Gina Morett as demonio / china poblana / Emiliano Zapata
- Elpidia Carrillo (credited as "Piya") as Malinche
- Jorge Humberto Robles as Hernán Cortés / mensajero / juez / Romeo / revolucionario
- Sebastián as voceador
- José Luis Urquieta as soldier
- María de la Luz Zendejas as Frida Kahlo / Sor Juana Inés de la Cruz / Capitán

== See also ==
- List of submissions to the 50th Academy Awards for Best Foreign Language Film
- List of Mexican submissions for the Academy Award for Best Foreign Language Film
