= Puerto maldito =

Puerto Maldito
- Poster of the movie
- Directed by: Alfredo B. Crevenna
- Written by: Mario Almada
- Starring: Mario Almada; Daniela Romo; Noé Murayama
- Cinematography: Rosalio Solano
- Edited by: Joaquín Ceballos
- Music by: Luis H. Bretón
- Distributed by: CONACINE
- Release date: 1977
- Country: Mexico
- Language: Spanish

Puerto Maldito (transl. Damned Port) is a Mexican action adventure film. It was filmed in 1977 and released in 1978.

== Synopsis ==
At the Mexican coast there's a rivalry between two families, the Changs and the Langs, this enmity earns power every day in the port, a place where the business of fish is very important. To defense the economy of the family they practice martial arts and ancient customs..

== Cast ==
- Mario Almada
- Fernando Almada
- Noé Murayama
- Enrique Novi
- Daniela Romo
- Hortensia Santoveña
- Amado Zumaya
- José Chávez
- Hu Huang Fu
- Baltazar Ramos
