= Mario Almada (actor) =

Mexican actor

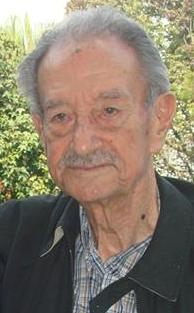
- Mario Almada in January 2014
- Born: Mario Almada Otero; January 7, 1922; Huatabampo, Sonora, Mexico
- Died: October 4, 2016 (aged 94); Cuernavaca, Morelos, Mexico
- Occupation: Actor/Film producer
- Years active: 1935–2016

Mario Almada Otero (January 7, 1922 – October 4, 2016) was a Mexican actor with a career lasting over seven decades. He appeared in over 300 films. He was most known for his roles in urban westerns, narco peliculas and action pictures. He was the brother of actor Fernando Almada.

== Biography ==
Almada was born in Huatabampo, Sonora. Apart from acting he was also a director, writer and film producer. He began his artistic career in Mexico during the 1930s. He has appeared in over 200 films, with his first being Madre Querida in 1935. In this film he acted alongside his brother Fernando as children as an extra. He would not appear in another film again until a few decades later.

Almada moved from his home city of Huatabampo to Ciudad Obregón and to Guadalajara, Jalisco, where he lived for many years until he settled down in Mexico City. Almada was born to a family connected to the film industry, and was exposed to film shootings from an early age and, when he moved to Mexico City, he began working at a nightclub called Cabaret Master that was owned by his father.

When his brother Fernando decided to take up acting, Mario decided to become a film producer. He wrote his first film script in 1963. The Almada brothers had their own family-run production company that eventually dissolved due to financial troubles from lack of profit.

In 1965 Mario played the role of Bruno Rey in the film Los Jinetes de la Bruja, which the Almada brothers produced and Fernando acted as protagonist. Rey was injured during the shooting and Mario agreed to take his place. At the end of the decade, Mario and Fernando were starting off as film protagonists in western films such as Emiliano Zapata. The following year (1969), Mario acted as protagonist alongside Julio Alemán. The film concerns a man (the Tunco Maclovio) who is haunted by the ghost of his friend Juan Mariscal, who died at the age of 15 from an accidental shooting by Tunco Maclovio. This film won him a Diosa de Plata as "Best Co-starring Actor".

Almada then filmed Aquellos años, Por eso, Cazador de asesinos, El puerto maldito, La viuda negra, Divinas palabras, El valle de los miserables, among others. He returned with La viuda negra and was nominated for an Ariel for his performance Although according to the official website of the Ariel, this nomination was not made until 1984, although La Viuda Negra was released in 1977.

In the 1970s Almada worked on a large number of films of the most diverse types and genres. There were times in which Mexican cinema was forced to seek new paths. Private film production almost disappeared and turned (or intended to be) progressive. It was a time of change in which Almada wanted to secure his place in film as an actor with multiple facets. He worked with westerns (Los doce malditos, 1972); historical reconstructions (Aquellos años, 1972); eschatology tapes and alarmism (La isla de los hombres solos, 1973); in second versions (Los desarraigados, 1975, based on the eponymous film of Gilberto Gazcón, 1958). He agreed to become co-star alongside Vicente Fernandez (El arracadas, 1977); in drug trafficking based films (La banda del carro rojo, 1976); in literary adaptations (Divinas palabras, 1977); ranchera melodramas, (Mariachi, 1976), and urban melodramas (Para usted jefa, 1979). In his more than 200 films the subject of righteous revenge is something that remains as a constant, and especially in movies directed by Pedro Galindo such as Los desalmados (1970); Todo el horizonte para morir (1970); El pistolero del diablo (1973); in 1981 he reinforced this trend with Cazador de asesinos directed by Jose Luis Urquieta, which is based on the ballad of the same name by the band Cadetes de Linares.

During the 1970s, Almada's films were box office successes. In this decade, however, he changed his usual role of a hero/cowboy figure to a recurring villain in urban action films, highlighted in Peor Que Las Fieras alongside Rogelio Guerra and Yolanda Liévana. Moreover, like in the end of the 1960s, he made another change, since he began to star without his brother in many of his films during the 1980s. In addition, he worked on films dealing with other subjects, such as La viuda negra (1977) and La fuga del rojo (1982). Almada recognizes that:

"Es difícil quedar satisfecho con el trabajo que uno hace, y siempre espera que la siguiente película sea mejor, aunque la gente lo que pide es acción. Hice películas de otro género como Divinas palabras, La india y no tuvieron éxito, la gente no las fue a ver, prefieren la acción y eso ha sostenido a la industria." ["It is difficult to be satisfied with the work you do, and you always hope that the next movie is better, but the people want action. I made films in other genres such as Divinas palabras, La india and they did not succeed, people did not go to see them, they prefer action and that has sustained the industry."]

In 1987 he was again nominated for an Ariel for the second time with his starring role as Chido Guan in the film Tacos de Oro, the story of a football team who are about to lose until Chido Guan (Almada) helps them win. Again, the film was shot in 1985, but the Mexican Academy of Motion Picture Arts and Sciences did not nominate the film until 1987.

In 1990 Almada collaborated with Los Tigres del Norte again in the film La Camioneta Gris. Previously in 1978, Almada, alongside his brother Fernando, had collaborated with the band in the film La Banda del Carro Rojo alongside Pedro Infante Jr. From 1997 to 2001, he played an important role in the Grupo Exterminador album "Narco Corridos 2" where he appeared on the cover and also conducted dialogues for most of the album's songs. In the 1997 album El Chile Pelaiz he reappeared on the cover. In 1999 he created dialogues for the track "Contrabando en los huevos" and participated in the video that was banned by the SCT and his last appearance for the band was on the album "Reunión de perrones" where he appeared with other Mexican actors. For his contributions to the motion picture industry, Almada has been inducted into the Paseo de las Luminarias in Mexico City.

== Later years ==
Almada's films continued with themes of drug trafficking and violence. He played the role of a godfather in the 2006 film Bajo la misma luna. The film is about a boy who crosses the Mexican-American Border in order to reunite with his mother. The film's name has been changed to La Misma Luna since January 2007 and was officially released in Mexico on September 7, 2007, and in the United States on September 28, 2007.

In 2008 Almada played a secondary role during the second season of the Mexican television series El Pantera, playing the role of Don Almagro. In 2010 he appeared on the Narco satire El Infierno, made by Luis Estrada. He played the role of the drug trafficker known as "El Texano", an intermediary between the highland narcotics producers and the people of Jose Reyes. It is an unusual role for him to take on in his career full of mafia-related films, where he often plays an incorruptible police officer or a peaceful civilian who ends up seeking revenge.

== Death ==
Almada died in his sleep at the age of 94 on October 4, 2016.

== Awards ==
=== Diosa de Plata ===
Year	Category	Film	Result
1968	Newcomer of the year	Todo por nada	Winner
1969	Best Co-starring Actor	El tunco Maclovio	Winner

=== Premios Ariel ===
Year	Category	Film	Result
1987	Best Actor	Chido Guan, el tacos de oro	Nominated
1984	Best Actor	La viuda negra	Nominated

1980{# Best Mexican Actor

== Selected filmography ==
- El Infierno (2010)
- La Misma Luna (2007)
- El Charro Juárez (2007)
- Una de Balazos (2005)
- El Dedos de Oro (2004)
- Tianguis, Ratas de la Ciudad (2003)
- La Noche De Los Guerreros (2002)
- Tengo Los Huevos Bien Puestos (2002)
- El Gavilán de la Sierra (2002)
- Avioneta Colombiana (2002)
- Las Ratas de la Frontera (2001)
- La Camioneta Gris II (2000)
- El Regreso de Camelia la Chicana (2000)
- La Vengadora de la Uzi (2000)
- El Corrido de José Ramón y María (1999)
- El Fantasma de la Coca (1999)
- Matar o Morir (1999)
- Tumba Para Dos (1999)
- Jueves de Corpus (1998)
- Amanecer Sangriento (1998)
- Rodeo de Media Noche II (1998)
- Tijuana, Ciudad de Narcos (1998)
- La Cheyenne del Año (1997)
- Halcón, Asesino Professional (1997)
- Rodeo de Media Noche (1997)
- Viajero (1996)
- La Juez Lobo (1996)
- Un Asesinato perfecto (1995)
- Un Indio Quiere Llorar (1994)
- Sinaloa (1994)
- Ranger: Muerte en Texas (1993)
- El Salario de la Muerte (1993)
- El Fiscal de Hierro III (1992)
- Chicago: Pandillas Salvajes (1991)
- Tijuana Jones (1991)
- Juan Nadie (1990)
- La Camioneta Gris (1990)
- El Fiscal de Hierro II (1989)
- El Fiscal de Hierro (1988)
- Un Hombre Violento (1986)
- El Extraño Hijo del Sheriff (1986)
- Tacos de Oro (1985)
- Gatilleros del Río Bravo (1984)
- Pistoleros Famosos (1981)
- Emilio Varela vs. Camelia la Texana (1980)
- Cyclone (1978)
- El Arracadas (1978)
- La Banda Del Carro Rojo (1978)
- Divinas palabras (1977)
- Ay Chihuahua No Te Rajes(1977)
- Puerto Maldito (1977)
- Length of War (1976)
- El valle de los miserables
- Those Years (1973)

== Films by decade ==
Mario Almada has participated in over 500 films.

=== 1960s ===
- Los jinetes de la bruja (En el viejo Guanajuato)(1966)
- El tesoro de Atahualpa (1968)
- Todo por nada (1968)

=== 1970s ===
- Sculo(1970)
- Zapata (1970)
- El tunco Maclovio (1970)
- Eye for an Eye (1971)
- Los desalmados (1971)
- Todo el horizonte para morir (1971)
- No Exit (1971)
- Por Eso (1972)
- Indio (1972)
- Los indomables (1972)
- Los hombres no lloran (1973)
- Aquellos años (1973)
- La tigresa (1973)
- Los doce malditos (1974)
- Mulato (1974)
- Debieron ahorcarlos antes (1974)
- Island of Lost Souls (1974)
- Pistolero del diablo (1974)
- Los galleros de Jalisco (1974)
- La Banda del carro rojo (1975)
- Simon Blanco (1975)
- El valle de los miserables (1975)
- Un mulato llamado Martín (1975)
- Peor que las fieras (1976)
- El hombre (1976)
- La India (1976)
- Los desarraigados (1976)
- Longitud de guerra (1976)
- En defensa propia (1977)
- La viuda negra (1977)
- Dinastía de la muerte (1977)
- Los temibles (1977)
- Mariachi Fiesta de sangre (1977)
- Mil millas al sur (1978)
- Carroña (1978)
- El arracadas (1978)
- El cuatro dedos (1978)
- Divinas palabras (1978)
- The Whip (1978)
- Cyclone (1978)
- El fin del tahur (1979)
- 357 magnum (1979)
- La mafia de la frontera (1979)
- El cortado (1979)
- Puerto maldito (1979)

=== 1980s ===
- El gatillo de la muerte (1980)
- Ay Chihuahua no te rajes! (1980)
- La sucesión (1980)
- Under Siege (1980)
- El rey de los tahures (1980)
- Para usted jefa (1980)
- Emilio Varela vs Camelia la Texana (1980)
- La muerte del Palomo (1981)
- Treinta segundos para morir (1981)
- Pistoleros famosos (1980)
- Herencia de muerte (1981)
- El extraño hijo del Sheriff (1982)
- El canto de los humildes (1982)
- Una leyenda de amor (1982)
- Contrabandos humanos (1982)
- Las pobres illegales (1982)
- San Miguel el alto (1982)
- La mugrosita (1982)
- Los cuates de la Rosenda (1982)
- Los dos matones (1983)
- Cazador de asesinos (1981)
- Aborto: Canta a la vida (1983)
- Siete en la mira (1984)
- Asalto en Tijuana (1984)
- Gatilleros del Río Bravo (1984)
- Encuentro con la muerte (1984)
- Caceria de un criminal (1984)
- La muerte del chacal (1984)
- Hombres de acción (1984)
- Cobra Gang (1985)
- Operación marihuana (1985)
- El escuadrón de la muerte (1985)
- Tacos de oro (1985)
- Escape sangriento (1985)
- La fuga del rojo (1985)
- El gatillo de la muerte (1985)
- Los dos frailes (1986)
- La venganza de la Coyota (1986)
- Cartucho cortado (1986)
- Verdugo de traidores (1986)
- La muerte de un pistolero (1986)
- At the Edge of the Law: Rescue Mission (1986)
- Un hombre violento (1986)
- La venganza del rojo (1986)
- The Killer Trailer (1986)
- Dias de matanza (1987
- Municipio de la muerte (1987)
- Emilio Varela vs. Camelia la Texana (1987)
- La jaula de oro (1987)
- Trágico terremoto en México (1987)
- Yo el ejecutor (1987)
- Ansia de matar (1987)
- The Bloody Monks (1988)
- Noche de buitres (1988)
- Me llaman violencia (1989)
- El fugitivo de Sonora (1989)
- Apuesta contra la muerte (1989)
- Violación (1989)
- Cargamento mortal (1989)
- El fiscal de hierro (1989) - Eduardo Lobo (El Fiscal De Hierro)
- Cabalgando con la muerte (1989)
- El cuatrero (1989)
- Tres veces mojado (1989)
- Programado para morir (1989)

=== 1990s ===
- Emboscada (1990)
- Prisioneros de la selva (1990)
- Agentes federales (1990)
- La secta de la muerte (1990)
- Atentado (1990)
- La mujer judicial (1990)
- En la línea del fuego (1990)
- Los demonios del desierto (1990)
- Atrapados en la coca (1990)
- Desafiando a la muerte (Agentes federales) (1990)
- La zona del silencio (1990)
- Noche de pánico (1990)
- Vivir o morir (1990)
- La justicia en sus manos (1990)
- La camioneta gris (1990)
- El homicida (1990)
- Carrera contra la muerte (1990)
- El último escape (1990)
- Un corazón para dos (1990)
- El fiscal de hierro 2: La venganza de Ramona (1990) - Eduardo Lobo (El Fiscal De Hierro)
- Juan Nadie (1990)
- Policía rural (1990)
- Pueblo de madera (1990)
- Orden de aprehensión (1991)
- El silla de ruedas (1991)
- Chicago, pandillas salvajes (1991)
- Tijuana Jones (1991)
- Armas, robo y muerte (1991)
- Furia de venganza (1991)
- Maverick... Lluvia de sangre (1991)
- La huella de un asesino (1991)
- El corrido de los Perez (1991)
- Chicago, pandillas salvajes II (1991)
- Reportera en peligro (1991)
- Tengo que matarlos (1991)
- Los tres gallos (1991)
- Hembras de tierra caliente (1991)
- Jóvenes delincuentes (1991)
- Traición (1991)
- Cadenas de violencia (1992)
- Terreno prohibido (1992)
- El ofico de matar (1992)
- Armas de fuego (1992)
- El fiscal de hierro 3 (1992) - Eduardo Lobo (El Fiscal De Hierro)
- Pandilleros: (olor a muerte 2)(1992)
- Traficantes de niños (1992)
- Muerte en Tijuana (1992)
- El prófugo (1992)
- Alcohol, odio y muerte (1993)
- El salario de la muerte (1993)
- Tempestad de odio (1993)
- Un pistolero implacable (1993)
- Mariachi (1993)
- El silla de ruedas II (1993)
- Ranger II: El narcotunel (1993)
- Village of the Damned (1993)
- Transplandes illegales (1994)
- El hombre de Medellín (1994)
- Guardianes de la dimensión prohibida (1994)
- Duelo final (1994)
- Sinaloa, tierra de hombres (1994)
- Atrapados en la venganza (1994)
- El silla de ruedas 3 (Tienes que morir) (1994)
- El policía y el pareja (1994)
- Secuestro salvaje (1994)
- Morir a mi manera (1994)
- Uzi ráfaga mortal (1995)
- Yaqui indomable (1995)
- Un asesinato perfecto (1995)
- Fuerza maldita (1995)
- Una mujer con oficio (1995)
- La fuga de los Pérez (1995)
- Secuestro (1995)
- A sangre fría (1995)
- Mestizo (1995)
- El depredador voraz (1995)
- Traficantes de muerte (1995)
- Venganza silenciosa (1995)
- Señalado para morir (1995)
- La hiena humana (1995)
- El fiscal de hierro 4 (1995) - Eduardo Lobo (El Fiscal De Hierro)
- La sombra del negro (1996)
- El gato de Chihuahua (1996)
- Viajero (1996)
- Tumba para un narco (1996)
- La juez Lobo (1996)
- El llamada de la sangre (1996)
- Violencia urbana (1996)
- Campeón (1997)
- El extraño visitante (1997)
- Vengarse matando (1997)
- Masacre nocturna (1997)
- Halcon asesino profesional (1997)
- Agentes de servicios especiales (1998)
- El séptimo asalto (1998)
- Conspiración exterminio (1998
- Justicia para un criminal (1998)
- El regreso de la bestia (1998)
- El dientes de oro (1998)
- El último cartucho (1999)
- El fantasma de la coca (1999)
- Sendero mortal II (1999)
- Kilos de muerte (1999)
- Tumba para dos (1999)
- Ranger, la última misión (1999)
- Caminos chuecos (1999)
