= A Sweet Scent of Death =

1999 film

- Film poster
- Original title: Un dulce olor a muerte
- Directed by: Gabriel Retes
- Written by: Guillermo Arriaga
- Starring: Karra Elejalde; Ana Álvarez; Héctor Alterio; Diego Luna
- Cinematography: Claudio Rocha
- Release date: July 1999 (Moscow)
- Running time: 90 minutes
- Countries: Mexico; Spain; Argentina
- Language: Spanish

A Sweet Scent of Death (Spanish: Un dulce olor a muerte) is a 1999 drama film directed by Gabriel Retes based on the novel of the same name by Guillermo Arriaga who also wrote the screenplay. It was entered into the 21st Moscow International Film Festival. It is a co-production among companies from Mexico, Spain, and Argentina.

== Cast ==
- Diego Luna as Ramón
- Laila Saab as Adela
- Karra Elejalde as El Gitano
- Arap Bethke as Lucio
- Héctor Alterio as Justino
- Odiseo Bichir as Pascual
- Juan Carlos Colombo as La Amistad
- Alfredo Alfonso as Natalio
- Ignacio Retes as Marcelino
- Edna Necoechea as Francisca

== See also ==
- List of Mexican films of 1999
- List of Spanish films of 1999
- List of Argentine films of 1999
