= Paper Flowers (1977 film) =

1977 film

- Directed by: Gabriel Retes
- Written by: Rosa Delia Caudillo; Ignacio Retes; Egon Wolf
- Produced by: Héctor López
- Starring: Ana Luisa Peluffo
- Cinematography: Daniel López
- Edited by: Eufemio Rivera
- Release date: 1977
- Running time: 91 minutes
- Country: Mexico
- Language: Spanish

Paper Flowers (Spanish: Flores de papel) is a 1977 Mexican drama film directed by Gabriel Retes. It was entered into the 28th Berlin International Film Festival.

== Cast ==
- Ana Luisa Peluffo
- Gabriel Retes
- Tina Romero
- Claudio Brook
- Ignacio Retes
- Silvia Mariscal
- Juan Ángel Martínez
- Adriana Roel
