= Ana Luisa Peluffo =

Mexican actress (1929–2026)

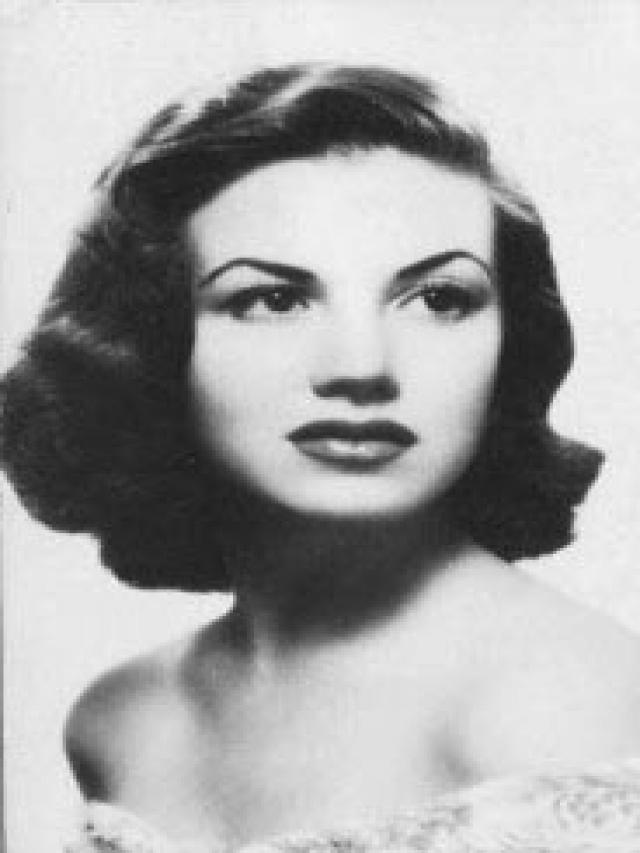
- Born: Ana Luisa de Jesús Quintana Paz Peluffo; 9 October 1929; Santiago de Querétaro, Querétaro, Mexico
- Died: 4 March 2026 (aged 96); Tepatitlán de Morelos, Jalisco, Mexico
- Occupation: Actress
- Years active: 1948–2014
- Spouse: Octavio Arias (m. 1957; div. 1957)
- Children: 1

Ana Luisa de Jesús Quintana Paz Peluffo (9 October 1929 – 4 March 2026), known professionally as Ana Luisa Peluffo, was a Mexican actress.

== Life and career ==
Ana Luisa Peluffo was born in the city of Querétaro in 1929. She appeared in more than 200 films and television shows from 1948 onwards, debuting as an extra in the American film Tarzan and the Mermaids (1948). In 1955, she became the first Mexican artist, male or female, to perform a public nude, which was presented in the film La Fuerza del deseo. Two years later, she married actor Octavio Arias in 1957, whom she divorced the same year due to her intense work schedules. In 1977, she starred in the film Paper Flowers, which was entered into the 28th Berlin International Film Festival.

She had a son named Martín Luis. Peluffo died on her ranch of Tepatitlán de Morelos, Jalisco, on 4 March 2026, at the age of 96.

== Selected filmography ==
- Tarzan and the Mermaids (1948)
- La adúltera (1956)
- Las esclavas de Cártago (1956)
- La diana cazadora (1957)
- Sail Into Danger (1957)
- Ama a tu prójimo (1958)
- Las señoritas Vivanco (1959)
- Sed de amor (1959)
- To Each His Life (1960)
- The Phantom of the Operetta (1960)
- Las momias de Guanajuato (TV) (1962)
- Farewell to Marriage (1968)
- Vagabundo en la lluvia (1968)
- El crepúsculo de un dios (1969)
- Ángeles y querubines (1972)
- La satánica (1973) directed by Alfredo Crevenna
- Pobre Clara (TV) (1975)
- El valle de los miserables (1975)
- La venida del Rey Olmos (1975)
- La casta divina (1977)
- Paper Flowers (1977)
- Juana Iris (TV) (1985)
- Monte Calvario (TV) (1986)
- Pobre señorita Limantour (TV) (1987)
- The Infernal Rapist (1988)
- El pecado de Oyuki (TV) (1988)
- Lo blanco y lo negro (TV) (1989)
- Entre la vida y la muerte (TV) (1993)
- Marimar (TV) (1994)
- Lazos de amor (TV) (1995)
- Tú y yo (TV) (1996)
- María Isabel (TV) (1997)
- Soñadoras (TV) (1998)
- Serafín (TV) (1999)
- Carita de ángel (TV) (2000)
- Contra viento y marea (TV) (2005)
- La virgen de la caridad del cobre (2008)
- Mujeres asesinas (TV) (2010)
- Cartas a Elena (2011)

== Sources ==
- Agrasánchez Jr., Rogelio (2001). Bellezas del cine mexicano/Beauties of Mexican Cinema. Archivo Fílmico Agrasánchez. ISBN 968-5077-11-8.
