= Las grandes aguas =

Mexican telenovela

- Genre: Telenovela
- Created by: Luis Spota
- Written by: Eric Krohnengold
- Directed by: Juan Carlos Muñoz
- Starring: Gonzalo Vega; Alma Muriel; José Carlos Ruiz; Antonio Medellín; Noé Murayama; Roberto Carrera; Constantino Costas
- Opening theme: Instrumental by Bebu Silvetti
- Country of origin: Mexico
- Original language: Spanish
- No. of episodes: 85

Production
- Executive producer: Carlos Sotomayor
- Production locations: Jalisco, Mexico
- Cinematography: Carlos Guerra Villareal
- Running time: 41-44 minutes

Original release
- Network: Canal de las Estrellas
- Release: June 19 – October 13, 1989

Related
- El cristal empañado; Simplemente María

Las grandes aguas (English title: The great waters) is a Mexican telenovela produced by Carlos Sotomayor for Televisa in 1989.

Gonzalo Vega and Alma Muriel starred the protagonists, while José Carlos Ruiz starred as main antagonist.

== Plot ==
Adaptation of the novel by Luis Spota, which is a testimony to the brutality of man against the life, nature, and destiny. The story begins when Roberto Rivas, an ambitious engineer, is commissioned to build a large dam in a place away from civilization, a small community in which among its people arises only incomprehension, hatred, resentment, passions and betrayals. Here also find wood, the wife of Robert, a woman deeply unhappy and eager to find happiness.

== Cast ==
- Alma Muriel as Lena de Rivas/Yolanda
- Gonzalo Vega as Roberto Rivas
- Daniel Rodríguez as Danielin
- José Carlos Ruiz as Graciano Alonso
- Antonio Medellín as Antonio Álvarez
- Noé Murayama as Don Lupe
- Roberto Carrera as Sergio Peña
- Constantino Costas as Ángel Ocampo
- Alicia Fahr as Araceli de Ramos
- Jerardo as Rogelio Urbieta
- Irma Infante as Amalia de Álvarez
- David Reynoso as Don Artemio Rozas
- Juan Carlos Muñoz as Chinto
- Lili Blanco as María Alonso
- Pedro Infante as Óscar Ramos
- Gabriela Obregón as Sofía Álvarez
- Ivette Proal as Lorena
- Ramón Valdés Urtiz as Robertito Rivas
