= The Night Buffalo =

1999 novel by Guillermo Arriaga

- First edition
- Author: Guillermo Arriaga
- Original title: El Búfalo de la Noche
- Translator: Alan Page
- Language: Spanish
- Published: 1999 Norma, Mexico; May 2006 (English)
- Publication place: Mexico
- Media type: Print (Hardback & Paperback)
- Pages: 236 pp

The Night Buffalo (orig. Spanish El Búfalo de la Noche) is a novel by Guillermo Arriaga.

== Plot summary ==
After Gregorio commits suicide, his friend Manuel finds himself unraveling his late friend’s world, and what led him to suicide. Gregorio’s tortuous relationship with his girlfriend is now inherited by Manuel; he becomes involved with his late friend’s girlfriend. Gregorio has missed appointments, left strange messages, and has been harassed by a vengeful policeman.

== Release details ==
- 2005, UK, Sceptre Books (ISBN 978-0340839751), Pub date 27 March 2006, paperback (first English edition)
- 2006, ?, Atria Books (ISBN 978-0743281850), Pub date ? May 2006, hardback (English)
- 2007, USA, Washington Square Press (ISBN 978-0743281867), Pub date 20 February 2007, paperback (English)
- 2008, ?, Atria Books (ISBN 978-0743286664), Pub date ? March 2008, paperback (Spanish El Búfalo de la Noche edition)
