= Divinas palabras (1977 film) =

- Directed by: Juan Ibáñez
- Written by: Ramón del Valle-Inclán; Juan Ibáñez
- Produced by: CONACINE; Fernando Almada
- Starring: Silvia Pinal; Mario Almada; Rita Macedo
- Cinematography: Gabriel Figueroa
- Distributed by: CONACINE
- Release date: July 6, 1978
- Running time: 96 minutes
- Country: Mexico
- Language: Spanish

Divinas palabras (English: Divine Words) is a 1977 Mexican film directed by Juan Ibáñez and starring Silvia Pinal and Mario Almada. The film is based on the play of the same name by Spanish author Ramón del Valle-Inclán.

== Plot ==
Mari Gaila is a lady who lives between ragged, thieves, prostitutes, dwarfs and other misshapen beings, in a rare box at a country and a vague time. Her husband, is a poor sacristan who agrees with other relatives to do business with the display of his orphaned nephew, a intellectually disabled dwarf. Caught in committing deception with her lover, Mari Gaila is caged naked and punished by the people.

== Cast ==
- Silvia Pinal ... Mari Gaila
- Mario Almada ... Séptimo Miau
- Rita Macedo ... Benita la costurera
- Guillermo Orea... Pedro Galio
- Martha Zavaleta ... Tatula
- Martha Verduzco ... Marica
- Carmen Flores ... Simoniña
- Xavier Estrada ... Laureano

== Production ==
This play of del Valle-Inclán had given the young Mexican director Juan Ibáñez a great success when he directed its production on stage, before his start as a film director with Los caifanes (1966).

The actress Silvia Pinal revealed: "I was going to do this movie with Luis Buñuel in Spain, but he struggled with the copyright."
