= Rafael Corkidi =

Mexican cinematographer

- Born: 20 May 1930; Puebla, Puebla, Mexico
- Died: 18 September 2013 (aged 83)
- Occupations: Cinematographer, film director, screenwriter
- Years active: 1957–2013

Rafael Corkidi Acriche (20 May 1930 – 18 September 2013) was a Mexican cinematographer, film director and screenwriter. He began his career as a cinematographer and contributed to the visual style and cinematography in three films directed by Alejandro Jodorowsky in Mexico, Fando y Lis, El Topo, and The Holy Mountain. Eventually he became a director in his own right, including films such as Angels and Cherubs, Auandar Anapu, Pafnucio Santo and Deseos, his last film before he decided to pioneer video as a mean of expression.

In 2013, he was awarded the Ariel de Oro, Mexico's top film prize, for his contributions to the Mexican film industry.

== Selected filmography / videography ==
- Fando y Lis (1968) (cinematographer)
- El Topo (1970) (cinematographer)
- Apolinar (1971) (cinematographer)
- Angels and Cherubs (1972)
- The Mansion of Madness (1973)
- The Holy Mountain (1973) (cinematographer)
- Auandar Anapu (1975)
- Pafnucio Santo (1977)
- Deseos (1978)

Video

- Las Lupitas (1984)
- Figuras de la pasión (1984)
- Relatos (short) (1986)
- Huelga / Strike (documentary short) (1987)
- Señores y señoras (documentary short) (1988)
- Querida Benita (short) (1989)
- Forjadores (documentary short) (1990)
- Murmullos (1991)
- Folklor (1991)
- Rulfo aeternum (1992)
- Urbano y Natalia (short) (1994)
- El maestro prodigioso (2010)
