= Broken Flag =

1979 film

- Directed by: Gabriel Retes
- Written by: Ignacio Retes; Gabriel Retes
- Produced by: Jorge Santoyo
- Starring: Fernando Balzaretti
- Cinematography: Genaro Hurtado
- Release date: 21 June 1979
- Running time: 96 minutes
- Country: Mexico
- Language: Spanish

Broken Flag (Spanish: Bandera rota) is a 1979 Mexican drama film directed by Gabriel Retes. It was entered into the 11th Moscow International Film Festival.

== Cast ==
- Cristina Baker
- Fernando Balzaretti as Luis Iriarte
- Elpidia Carrillo as Veronica
- Mario Casillas
- Mario Diaz Mercado as Periodista
- Manuel Fábregas as Eduardo Vallejo
- Aarón Hernán
- Gonzalo Lora
- Juan Ángel Martínez
- Enrique Ontiveros
