= Gabriel Retes =

Mexican film director (1947–2020)

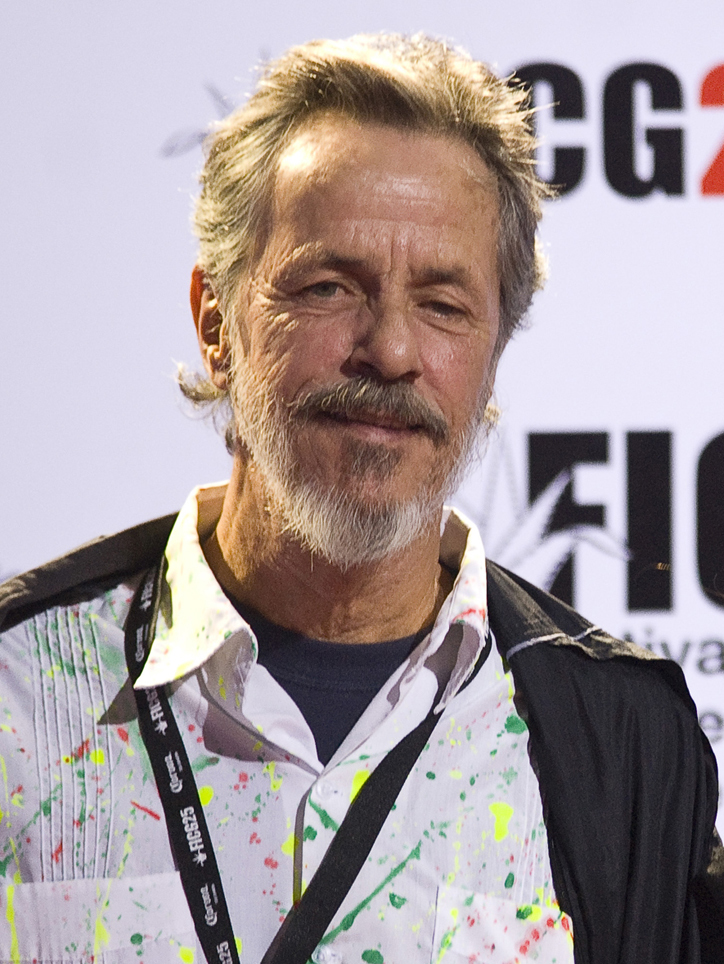
- Retes in March 2010
- Born: José Ignacio Gabriel Jorge Retes Balzaretti; March 25, 1947; Mexico City, Mexico
- Died: April 20, 2020 (aged 73)
- Occupation: Director
- Years active: 1970–2020

José Ignacio Gabriel Jorge Retes Balzaretti (March 25, 1947 – April 20, 2020) was a Mexican film director, writer, producer, and actor. His 1977 film Paper Flowers was entered into the 28th Berlin International Film Festival. His 1979 film Broken Flag was entered into the 11th Moscow International Film Festival. His 1999 film A Sweet Scent of Death was entered into the 21st Moscow International Film Festival.

== Filmography ==
- Arresto domiciliario (2008)
- Bienvenido-Welcome II (2006)
- @festival.ron (2003)
- Despedida de amor (2003)
- La mudanza (2003)
- Un dulce olor a muerte (Spanish and Argentinian co-production – 1998)
- Bienvenido-Welcome (1994)
- El Bulto (1991)
- El nacimiento de un guerrillero (1989)
- La ciudad al desnudo (1988)
- Los náufragos del Liguria II: Los piratas (1985)
- Los náufragos del Liguria (1985)
- Mujeres salvajes (1984)
- The Recourse to the Method (1978)
- Bandera rota (1978)
- Flores de papel (1977)
- Nuevo mundo (1976)
- Chin Chin el teporocho (1975)
- Los bandidos (1974)
- Los años duros (1973)
- Tribulaciones en el seno de una familia burguesa (1972)
- El asunto (1972)
- Fragmentos (1971)
- Comunicados de insurgencia obrera (1971)
- El paletero (1970)
- Sur (1970)
