= Todo por amor =

Mexican telenovela

- Genre: Telenovela
- Created by: Ricardo García
- Based on: La madre by Mónica Agudelo Tenorio
- Developed by: Luis Zelkowicz; Luis Felipe Ybarra
- Written by: Guillermo Ríos; Laura Sosa; Leticia López-Margalli; Araceli Monsell
- Screenplay by: Rodrigo Johnson
- Directed by: Javier Patrón Fox; Silvana Zuanetti
- Starring: Angélica Aragón; Fernando Luján; Plutarco Haza; Ana de la Reguera; Damián Alcázar; Roberto Sosa; Cecilia Suárez; Álvaro Guerrero
- Opening theme: "Carmen" by Pedro Guerra
- Composer: Lucía Álvarez
- Country of origin: Mexico
- Original language: Spanish
- No. of seasons: 1
- No. of episodes: 250

Production
- Executive producer: Mónica Skorlich
- Producer: María Auxiliadora Barrios
- Production location: Mexico City
- Cinematography: Óscar Ruiz Palacios; Jorge Ríos Villanueva; Luis Ávila; Fernando Ramos; Jorge Medina
- Editor: José Arturo Sedano
- Camera setup: Multi-camera
- Running time: 42-45 minutes
- Production companies: TV Azteca; Argos Comunicación

Original release
- Network: Azteca Trece
- Release: January 27, 2000 – January 12, 2001

Todo por amor is a Mexican telenovela produced by Argos Comunicación for TV Azteca. It is based on the 1998 Colombian telenovela La madre, created by Mónica Tenorio Agudelo. It aired on Azteca Trece from 27 January 2000 to 12 January 2001. The series stars Angélica Aragón and Fernando Luján.

== Premise ==
Carmén Dávila has been married for 26 years to Enrique, and is the mother of five children, ranging in age from 10 to 24. Although Carmen apparently leads a happy family life, all is not what it seems. She will discover that a life dedicated to love and giving does not guarantee happiness. Carmen will struggle to raise her children, despite the dangers that loom over them, and in her task she will count on the help of Gonzalo, a kind widower who will mean for Carmen a new way of loving.

== Cast ==
=== Main ===
- Angélica Aragón as Carmen Dávila
- Fernando Luján as Gonzalo Robles
- Plutarco Haza as Javier Villegas Torreblanca
- Ana de la Reguera as Lucía García Dávila
- Damián Alcázar as Mariano Ayala
- Roberto Sosa as Camilo
- Cecilia Suárez as Carmina "Mina" García Dávila
- Anna Ciocchetti as Regina Olazábal de la Colina
- Patricia Llaca as Raquel
- Laura Luz as Graciela
- Claudia Lobo as Martha
- Lourdes Villarreal as Lola
- Joaquín Garrido as Andrés
- Ana Celia Urquidi as Esther
- Alejandro Calva as Álvaro
- Eduardo Arroyuelo as Sergio García Dávila
- Gian Piero Díaz as Francisco García Dávila
- Aléx Perea as Enrique "Quique" García Dávila
- Vanessa Ciangherotti as María Robles
- Manuel Blejerman as Emilio
- Mauricio Fernández as Miguel
- Álvaro Guerrero as Enrique García
- Fabián Corres as Manuel Iriarte
- Francisco de la O as Luis Madrazo
- Carmen Madrid as Marlene
- Elizabeth Guindi as Amalia
- Guillermo Ríos as Onésimo Ríos
- Carlos Torres Torrija as Suárez

=== Recurring and guest stars ===
- Irene Azuela as Marisol
- Juan Carlos Barreto as Rubén
- Gabriel Porras as Alejandro
- Jorge Cáceres as Armando
- José María Yazpik as Mateo
- Margarita Gralia as Laura
- Carmen Beato as Mercedes "Meche"
- Luis Felipe Tovar as Adolfo Mancera

== Production ==
Production and filming of the series began on 29 November 1999, on location in Colonia Roma, Mexico City. The production had a total of 120 episodes planned for broadcast; however, Epigmenio Ibarra announced in September 2000 that the telenovela would be extended until January 2001, increasing the number of episodes originally planned. Todo por amor was the last telenovela of the first co-production agreement between Argos Comunicación and TV Azteca since 1994, ending the same day of its final episode.

== Release ==
=== Broadcast ===
The series premiered on Azteca Trece on 27 January 2000, from Monday to Friday at 9:00 p.m. replacing La vida en el espejo. From 1 to 2 February 2000, the series rebroadcast its first two episodes, respectively, and resumed broadcasting on 3 February 2000. The series ended on 12 January 2001 with 250 episodes, being replaced the following week by Amores, querer con alevosía.
