= List of Los Rey characters =

Los Rey is a Mexican telenovela produced by Elisa Salinas for TV Azteca in 2012, adapted from David Jacobs' Dallas. It stars Rossana Najera, Michel Brown and Leonardo Garcia.

== Family tree ==
This Family tree denotes the genetic and marital relationships of characters from the fictional television series Los Rey:

Family tree

Uvaldo San Vicente	Mariangela de San Vicente
Mercedes Wanles	Pedro Malvido	Manuela San Vicente	Everardo Juan Rey Martinez	Consuelo Bueno
Pedro Luis Malvido Wanles	Lorenza Malvido Wanles	Laureano Malvido San Vicente	Guillermo Rey San Vicente	Everardo Rey San Vicente	Matias Rey San Vicente	Ismael Rey Bueno
Janice Malvido	Delfina Rey Ortuña
Roberto Treviño Rey
Rey Malvido

== Main characters ==
=== The Reys ===
Actor	Character	Description	Face card Translation
Fernando Luján	Everardo Juan Nepomuceno Rey Martínez "Vadote" / "Don Juan"	Patriarch of the family. Was Pedro's "friend" in the past. Betrays Pedro, and takes all of his property. Guillermo, Evedardo, Matías and Ismaels' father. Manuela's husband.	El rey The King
Ofelia Medina	Manuela San Vicente de Rey "Many"	The only child of Uvaldo San Vicente, was in love and had a son with Pedro Malvido. Mother of Laureano, Guillermo, Everardo and Matías. Wife of Everardo Sr.	El corazón The sweetheart
Ariel López Padilla	Guillermo Rey San Vicente "MTemo"	Eldest son of Manuela and Everardo. Brother of Vado and Matias. Father of Fina. Accused of killing his wife, sent to jail. Had an affair with Paola. Julias' husband.	El ausente The absentee
Leonardo García	Everardo Rey San Vicente "Vado"	Ambitious, hates Matias. Wants to take all the family's power. Husband of Paola. Sterile. Has an affair with Aurora and Julia. Tries to destroy The Malvidos.	El alacrán The scorpion
Elizabeth Cervantes	Paola Garces-Garza de Rey	Vado's wife, a beauty queen. Before her wedding with Vado, she slept with Memo, whom had been her lover, and became pregnant. She aborted it for the sake of her beauty. Years later, she and Ismael became lovers, and is once again pregnant, but this time with Ismael's child.	La rosa The rose
Michel Brown	Matias Rey San Vicente	Lorenza's husband, youngest son of Manuela and Everardo. Brother of Guillermo and Everardo.. In love with Lorenza	El valiente The brave one
Carolina Miranda	Delfina Rey Ortuña "Fina"	20 years old, but still has not completed her secondary education. Hated her parents, Memo and Andrea, for abandoning her. Has a son named Beto. Quinos' ex-girlfriend. Had an affair with Amado. In love with Amado.	La sirena The mermaid

=== The Malvidos ===
Actor	Character	Description	Face card Translation
José Alonso	Pedro Malvido Jimenez"Perico"	Hates Everardo, in love with Many. Father of Laureano, Pedro Luis and Lorenza. Forty years ago he was cheated by Everardo to sell his petrol station at no profit . Alcoholic.	El borracho/La calavera The drunkard/The skull
Victor Huggo Martin	Laureano Isidro de la Garza "El hijo de nadie"	Son of Pedro and Manuela. Schizophrenic, eldest brother of Memo, Vado, Pedro Luis, Matías and Lorenza. Although he seems lunatic and was often seen walking around the city, mumbling about politics, he is actually a genius.	El logo The mad
Juan Alfonso Baptista	Pedro Luis Malvido Wanles"Peluso"	Enemy of Los Rey.Brother of Lorenza and Laureano. Son of Pedro. Has an affair with Julia and uses her to destroy The Reys. Bad later good.	El diablito The little devil
Rosie Nájera	Lorenza Malvido Wanles de Rey	Married and in love with Matias. Daughter of Pedro and sister of Pedro Luis and Laureano.	

=== Employees, friends and enemies ===
Actor	Character	Description	Face card Translation
Ana Belena	Julia Mariscal de Rey	Was in love with Vado, Pedro Luis' ex-lover, was in love with Everardo Sr. when she was younger. She later falls in love and marries Memo. Beto's "mother". Assistant of Grupo Rey	La malquerida The unloved one
Fernando Alonso	Amado Treviño	In love with Fina.Cuba's ex-husband Foreman of The Reys. Roberto's father.	El bueno The good
Cecilia Ponce	Aurora "Yoya" Longoria	Matias' ex girlfriend and secretary. Lover of Chino. Was abandoned by Matias during their wedding. Tries to get back with him.	La Trille; The sad
Jorge Luis Vazquez	Joel "El chino" Matus	Quino's father. He was a boxing champion and now owns a restaurant. In love with Aurora.	El inteligente The clever
María de la Fuente	Rosario Deshamps	Gynecologist. Lorenza's doctor. Gina's mother. In love with Matias.	La rival The rival
Rykardo Hernandez	Leonardo Herrán	Atilio's son. Hates The Reys, mainly Vado, for causing the death of his father.	El junior The junior
Laura Palma	Lucia del Muro	Lorenza's friend, likes Joel. Lover of Moises	La mariposa The butterfly
Humberto Bua	Ismael "El chulo"	Bastard. Consuelo and Everardo's son. Works as an servant of Los Rey. In hate with Paola. He is contracted by Vado to make Paola pregnant and succeeded.	El amoroso The loverlike
Alejandra Prado	Consuelo Buelna "La chula"	Works at The Reys' mansion. Ismael's mother.	La otra The other one
Cynthia Rodriguez	Tamara	Was in love with Amado. A singer at a night club. Likes Gervasio.	La estrella The star
Lourdes Villarreal	Ricarda	Maid of The Reys	La nana The nanny
Raul Sandoval	Gervasio	Works at "Rey de reyes", The Reys' ranch. Had a relationship with Tamara	El hierro The iron man
Carlos Fonseca	Joaquin Matus "Quino"	Joel's son, Fina's schoolmate & boyfriend	El gallo The rooster
Martin Altomaro	Moises "Pepe"	Bartender at Joel's restaurant "El mesón del Chino". He was Chino's coach.Lover of Lucia	
Mishelle Garfias	Luz	Ricarda's goddaughters. Work at The Reys' mansion. Daughters of Tamara and Gervasio	Las gotas/Las gemelas The look alike/The twins
Alejandra Haydee	Cruz	Ricarda's goddaughters. Work at The Reys' mansion. Daughters of Tamara and Gervasio	Las gotas/Las gemelas The look alike/The twins
Marco Aurelio Nava	Ricardo Anaya	Pedro Luis' "friend" and adviser. He actually works for Vado. Ambitious. He wants to become a governor himself.	El politico The politician
Jose Luis Mosca	Andrade	Atilio's right-hand man. He actually works for Vado.	El guarro The skunk

== Special guest stars ==
Actor	Character	Description	Episode
Guillermo Larrea		Fina's school principal	Episode 3-
Rafael Sánchez Navarro	Atilio Herrán	Leonardo's father. A governor	Episode 4-13
Sergio Basañez	Ronco Abadí	Drug dealer	Episode 14-50 (hidden), 52-
Tomás Goros	Felix	Vado's driver. Ex-policeman	Episode 16-70
Karen Sentíes	Andrea Loperena de Rey	Memo's wife, Fina's mother, supposedly dead after the car crash in Las Vegas	Episode 19-25.
Fran Meric	Jenny Laborde	Memo's lawyer in Las Vegas	Episode 19-
Guillermo Quintanilla	Nicodemo	Tamara's father.	Episode 23-
Julieta Egurrola	Juliana	Julia's mother. Care taker of Beto.	Episode 25-
Miguel Angel Ferriz	Ubaldo San Vicente	Manuela's father.	Episode 36-40
Fernando Becerril	Gilberto Longoria	Aurora's father. Charged of false investment solicited by Ronco Abadi, Don Juan, Leonardo Herran and Vado.	Episode 46-
Francisco de la O	Elias Denigris Jr.	Manuela's lawyer.	Episode 58-
Aura Cristina Geithner	Lucero Longoria	Gilberto's sister, Aurora's paternal aunt.	Episode 61-70
Lia Ferre	Carmen	Lucero's daughter, Aurora's cousin, Gilberto's lover.	Episode 62-
Arturo Beristain	Elias Denigris Sr.	Elias' father	Episode 87-

== Guest stars ==
Actor	Character	Description	Episode
Karla Rico	Alma	Lorenza's boss, Rosario's patient	Episode 1-66
Sebastian Moncayo	Edmundo	Rosario's ex-husband, Gina's father	Episode 2-
Jessica Roteache	Tanya	Locked up with Fina	Episode 4-
Flavio Peniche	Secuaz		Episode 7-
Valentina Giron	Georgina	Rosario and Edmundo's daughter	Episode 8-
Paulina Marron	News presenter		Episode 6-
Giovanna Romo	Beatriz	Surgical doctor. Cross character from A Corazón Abierto	Episode 12-19, 113
Rodrigo Cachero	Photographer	Uncredited	Episode 12 (in flashback)
Jorge Zepeda	Miguel Angel Sanchez "Guacho"	Memo's Mexican jailmate	Episode 22-
Hector Kostifakis	Diablo	Ismael's saviour	Episode 24-
German Girotti		Fina's ex-boyfriend.	Episode 38
Adrian Rubio	Paola's masseur		Episode 41
Simone Victoria	Tisha	Witch	Episode 62.
Ariana Ron	Simone	Paola's modelling agent	Episode 50-
Jorge Celaya	Lino	Vado's new assistant. Replaces Felix.	Episode 60-
Jesus Vargas	Moncada	Bank guard chief	Episode 88-
Enrique Chi	Ceballos	Bank guard	Episode 88-
Napoleon Glockner		Bank officer	Episode 88-89
Javier Escobar		Guard	Episode 114
