= Angélica Aragón =

Mexican actress and singer

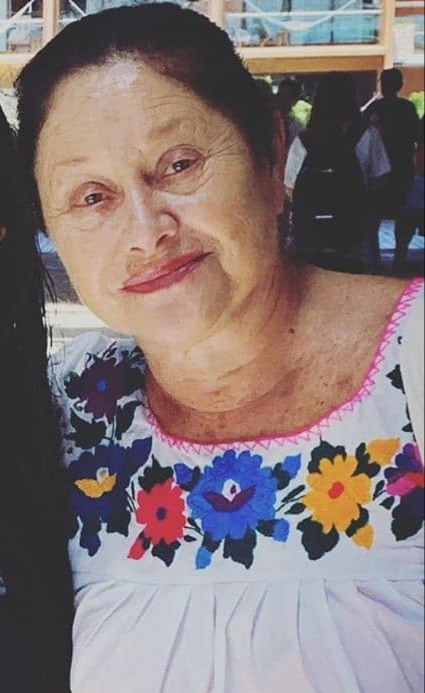
- Angélica Aragón in 2010
- Born: Angélica Espinoza Stransky; 11 July 1953 (age 73); Mexico City, México
- Education: London Academy of Music and Dramatic Art
- Occupations: Actress, singer
- Years active: 1970–present
- Spouse: Shajid (1972–1978)
- Partner: Rodrigo Martínez (1989–1990)
- Children: María
- Awards: Silver Ariel Award as Best Supporting Actress (1994) (2002)

Angélica Espinoza Stransky (born 11 July 1953), known professionally as Angélica Aragón (Spanish pronunciation: [aŋˈxelika aɾaˈɣon]), is a Mexican film, television, and stage actress and singer. She is the daughter of Mexican composer José Ángel Espinoza ("Ferrusquilla"). Aragón is recognized for her performances in various Mexican films such as Cilantro y perejil (1997), Sexo, pudor y lágrimas (1999), and El crimen del Padre Amaro (2002), as well as in American productions like A Walk in the Clouds (1995) and Dirty Dancing: Havana Nights (2002). She is also well known for starring in two notable Mexican telenovelas: Vivir un poco (1985) and Mirada de mujer (1997).

== Biography ==
=== Early life ===
Angelica Espinoza Stransky is the elder daughter of the Mexican actor and composer José Ángel Espinoza "Ferrusquilla" and Sonia Stransky. She had a younger sister named Vindia (deceased in 2008). On her mother's side, she has two half-siblings, Jacqueline and John. Her maternal grandfather, of Czech origin, was a soldier in the service of Emperor Franz Joseph of the Austro-Hungarian Empire and fought in the World War I. Her mother Sonia was the secretary of the musician Carlos Chávez. Her parents divorced when Angelica was three years old. She spent her childhood accompanying her father between television and film forums. Angelica lived with her mother and sister in a house in the Colonia del Valle of Mexico City, while also often living with her father.

=== Artistic training ===
Aragón wanted to study medicine. She studied at the Liceo Franco-Mexicano in Mexico City, where she met the Spanish actor Juan Ribó. Aragón joined the theatrical company led by Ribó, who was working on Federico García Lorca's works at the Teatro de la Alianza Francesa in Mexico City. In 1970, she also participated in a play by the director Antonio Pasi within the Festival Cervantino, in Guanajuato. With the support of her father, she played a small character in the telenovela El amor tiene cara de mujer in 1971, produced by Televisa and directed by German director Fernando Wagner. It was through Juan Ribó that Aragón met the actor, director and playwright Alejandro Jodorowsky, participating as an extra in the film La montaña sagrada (1973). Aragón took her artistic surname in tribute to her paternal grandmother, Fredesvinda Aragón, who died in childbirth at the age of 19.

A strike at the Universidad Nacional Autónoma de México led Aragón to emigrate to the United Kingdom. She studied theater, dance, and pantomime for seven years at the London Academy of Music and Dramatic Art (LAMDA). Eventually, she also took courses at the London School of Contemporary Dance. Parallel to her theatrical training, Aragón also did other activities in London. She worked as a cook, performed in a hospital, and sold children's clothing at Harrods. She also enrolled at the University of London, where she studied the philosophy of India, history, and languages. Aragón speaks seven languages: Spanish, English, French, Italian, Portuguese, Bengali, and Japanese. As a theater student, Aragón also worked for five years as a room dresser at the National Theatre in London.

Aragón went to India with her then-husband Shajid. On the recommendation of a professor at the School of Contemporary Dance in London, Aragón was accepted into Kerala Kalamandalam, one of the most important ritual dance schools in South India. Although this institution accepted only male students, Aragón was able to receive training outside the institution's classrooms. In India, Aragón witnessed many works of the Kathakali theater and participated in some plays.

=== Television ===
Returning to Mexico in 1980, Aragón joined the Mexican telenovelas of Televisa with the producer Valentín Pimstein, whom she met through the Greek director Dimitrio Sarrás. She started with a small role in the telenovela Sandra y Paulina (1980), starring Jacqueline Andere. In 1981 she acted in the telenovela El hogar que yo robé, with Angélica María. In 1982, she played the female antagonist role in the telenovela Vanessa, alongside Lucía Méndez. In 1983, she co-starred with Lucero in the popular children's telenovela Chispita. In 1984, she made two more telenovelas: La fiera, alongside Victoria Ruffo, and Principessa, a telenovela that ended shortly after she was offered her first leading role.

In 1985, Valentín Pimstein gave Aragón the starring role of the telenovela Vivir un poco, the first Mexican version of the Chilean telenovela La madrastra, by writer Arturo Moya Grau. In that telenovela, Aragón gave life to the persona of Andrea, a woman unjustly accused of murder and imprisoned for twenty years in Argentina. The telenovela gained a large following and it gave Aragón one of the most outstanding successes of her career.

In 1986, the producer and director Carlos Téllez offered Aragón the starring role in the hit telenovela Cuna de lobos, but she rejected it, being replaced by Diana Bracho. Aragón's increasing presence in movies caused her not to return to television until 1989, in La casa al final de la calle, a suspense and mystery telenovela co-starred by Héctor Bonilla and Leticia Calderón. The telenovela was produced by Juan Osorio and directed by Jorge Fons.

In 1990, Aragón starred in the telenovela Días sin luna alongside Sergio Goyri, where she interpreted a painter with a terminal illness. She also made a special appearance in the telenovela En carne propia, produced by Carlos Téllez, starring alongside Edith González and Gonzalo Vega.

In 1992, Aragón was invited to act as director of dialogue in the telenovela Madres egoístas, produced by Juan Osorio. In that same year, she played "Chole", an indigenous Zapotec woman in the telenovela De frente al sol, produced by Carla Estrada, costarring with the actress María Sorté. The telenovela was so successful, that in 1993 a sequel titled Más allá del puente was produced.

In 1996, Aragón appeared in the telenovela Cañaveral de pasiones, produced by Humberto Zurita and Christian Bach, and starring Daniela Castro and Juan Soler. In this telenovela, Aragón had her first opportunity to direct in television as a guest scene director. This would be the last telenovela performed to date by Aragón on Televisa.

In 1997, the company Argos Comunicación offered Aragón the starring role in the telenovela Mirada de mujer, a Mexican adaptation of the Colombian novel Señora Isabel by Bernardo Romero Pereiro. The telenovela was produced by TV Azteca. The story of María Inés Domínguez, a mature woman in love with a younger man, brought Aragón the greatest success of her television career in a telenovela that breaks contemporary stereotypes in Mexico. Aragón starred alongside Ari Telch, Fernando Luján, Margarita Gralia, Evangelina Elizondo, and an important cast of supporting actors.

After the success of Mirada de mujer, Aragón made only sporadic appearances on television, returning with a starring role in 2000 in the telenovela Todo por amor, a Mexican version of the Colombian telenovela La madre. In 2003, she returned to television for the sequel to Mirada de mujer: Mirada de mujer, el regreso. Although the telenovela had a good audience, it did not overtake the success of the first part. In 2005, Aragón appeared in her last significant television role in the miniseries Ni una vez más, about violence against women. She also directed some episodes of the TV Azteca program Lo que callamos las mujeres. It was not until 2011 that Aragón returned to television with a small role in the television series A corazón abierto, the Mexican version of the American series Gray's Anatomy.

=== Film ===
In 1984, Aragón made her debut in films in The Evil That Men Do with Charles Bronson, produced by Pancho Kohner (son of Mexican actress Lupita Tovar) and J. Lee Thompson. This was followed by three other Hollywood productions: Toy Soldiers (1984), by David Fisher, alongside Jason Miller and Tim Robbins; Samson and Delilah (1984), made for television, alongside Max von Sydow and Victor Mature, and Dune (1984), by David Lynch, alongside Silvana Mangano, Jose Ferrer, and singer Sting, among others. Due to her participation in a Mexican telenovela, Aragón had to decline the actor and director Robert Redford's invitation to co-star with him in the film The Milagro Beanfield War. Her role was taken by the Brazilian actress Sonia Braga.

In the Mexican cinema Aragón debuted in 1986 in the film Los dos frailes, next to the brothers Fernando and Mario Almada. She then appeared in other Mexican productions like Lamberto Quintero (1987) alongside the folk singer Antonio Aguilar; Sabor a mí (1988) with the singer Jose Jose, inspired by the life of the Mexican composer Alvaro Carrillo; La furia de un dios (1988), by Felipe Cazals, alongside Humberto Zurita and Assumpta Serna, and Goitia: un dios para si mismo (1989), by Diego López Rivera, inspired by the life of the painter Francisco Goitia, among other films.

At the beginning of the following decade, Aragón appeared in films like Pueblo de madera (1990), by Juan Antonio de la Riva, with Mario Almada and Gabriela Roel; Gertrudis (1992), based on the life of the Mexican political activist Gertrudis Bocanegra, with Ofelia Medina; the American production The Harvest with Miguel Ferrer and George Clooney; La señorita (1994), by Mario Hernández, with Jacqueline Andere and María Rojo, and Novia que te vea (1994), by Guita Schyfter, for which she received her first Silver Ariel Award for Best Supporting Actress.

In 1995, Aragón appeared in the successful film production A Walk in the Clouds, by Alfonso Aráu, with Keanu Reeves and Anthony Quinn. In that same year she won her second Silver Ariel Award as best supporting actress for her role in the film Cilantro y perejil, alongside Demián Bichir and Arcelia Ramírez and directed by Rafael Montero. In 1999, she appeared in the films Crónica de un desayuno by Benjamin Cann, and in the successful Sexo, pudor y lágrimas by Antonio Serrano.

In 2000, Aragón worked with Alfonso Arau in the film Picking Up the Pieces. In this production, Aragón also served as an assistant director, having the opportunity to work with stars such as Woody Allen, Kiefer Sutherland, and Sharon Stone. In 2002, she appeared in the controversial and successful film by Carlos Carrera El crimen del Padre Amaro next to Gael García Bernal, for which she won the third Silver Ariel Award of her cinematographic career. In 2004 she appeared in Dirty Dancing: Havana Nights, starring Diego Luna. In 2005 Aragón was part of the cast of the film La mujer de mi hermano, by Ricardo de Montreuil, alongside Barbara Mori. In 2006, she appeared in the film Bella by Alejandro Gómez Monteverde. In 2009 she appeared in the American production From Mexico with Love with Kuno Becker, in the Mexican production Recién cazado starring Jaime Camil, and in the American production Looking for Palladin by the filmmaker Andrzej Krakowski, with Ben Gazzara.

In the 2010s, Aragón acted in films like Cinco de mayo: La batalla (2013), again with actor Kuno Becker; the Spanish-Mexican co-production Todos están muertos (2014), by the filmmaker Beatriz Sanchiz, sharing a scene with Elena Anaya and Patricia Reyes Spíndola, and Treintona, soltera y fantástica (2016), starring Barbara Mori. In 2016 Aragón also lent her voice to a character in the Latin American dubbing of the animated Disney film Moana. In that same year, she also appeared in the film Mr. Pig, directed by Diego Luna and starring the American actor Danny Glover. For this performance Aragón received a nomination for a Silver Ariel Award in the category of Best Actress in a Minor Role.

=== Stage ===
Aragón began her acting career in various student theater projects at the Festival Cervantino in Guanajuato and at the Teatro de la Alianza Francesa. After meeting Alejandro Jodorowsky, Aragón had a small role in the play Zaratustra (1970), also featuring Héctor Bonilla, Carlos Ancira and Isela Vega. She also had a small role in the work The Lady of the Camellias (1970), directed by Jose Solé Nájera and produced by Dolores del Río.

Some of Aragón's more significant roles on stage include El día que pisamos la luna (1981), of Nancy Cárdenas; Fool for Love (1986), by Sam Shepard, with Ari Telch; Los derechos de la mujer (1988), with Rafael Banquells; Contrabando (1991), of Víctor Hugo Rascón, with Héctor Bonilla; Águila Real (1992), by Hugo Arguelles, about the life of Isabel Moctezuma; Las dos camelias (1993), directed by Susana Alexander; Poker de reinas (1993) by Víctor Hugo Rascón Banda, alongside Ofelia Medina and the singers Betsy Pecanins and Margie Bermejo; Cartas de amor, directed again by Alexander, first with Héctor Bonilla (1994), and years later with César Évora (2006); and El juego de la pasión (1995), directed by Mario Espinoza, with Fernando Balzaretti.

In 1996, Aragón starred in the Hellenic Theater of Mexico City's monologue Maquillaje (Kesho), by the Japanese author Hisashi Inoue, which commemorated 100 years of Japanese emigration to Mexico. For this piece, the actress received special permission from one of the main Japanese actors of the Kabuki theater, Nakamura Kankurō V. In the performance, Aragón interpreted an actress who represents all the masculine characters on stage, in reverse fashion to conventional Kabuki theater. The editing was directed by Wendell Cordz and was an outstanding theatrical successes for Aragón.

Other successful plays featuring Aragón include El verdadero oeste (2008), directed by José Caballero, with Plutarco Haza and Fabián Corres; Pequeños crímenes conyugales (2008), directed by Luis de Tavira, with Ricardo Blume; El juicio de Hidalgo (2010), directed by and starring Jorge Ortiz de Pinedo and Relaciones peligrosas (2013), with Jacqueline and Chantal Andere and directed by Aragón herself.

As director, Aragón also directed the films Tengamos el sexo en paz, starring Margarita Gralia (2000); Sueña (2007), with Irma Lozano and Aarón Hernán; Por razones oscuras (2008), starring Esteban Soberanes and Roberto D'Amico, and La última palabra (2016), starring D'Amico and Pablo Perroni. In 2013 she also starred in the musical show Su Majestad, El Bolero with D'Amico.

In 2014 Aragón was invited by the director Patrick Swanson to participate in The Christmas Revels, at the Sanders Theater at Harvard University.

=== Music ===
Having received artistic training in the United Kingdom that included music, Aragón released a record titled Silencio corazónin 1997, born with the intention of preserving the compositions of her father, José Ángel Espinoza or "Ferrusquilla". The album was independently recorded. In 2009 she released the album Échame a mi culpa: vida y canciones de "Ferrusquilla", a musical of her father's life. This was supported by a theatrical project featuring the actor Roberto D'Amico. In 2010, on the occasion of the bicentennial of Mexican independence, Aragón released a third album titled México: mi palabra más bella, produced by her father. In 2013, Aragón released an album titled Su Majestad, El Bolero, a tribute to the bolero genre. The disc was released at the Lunario del National Auditorium.

=== Social and political activism ===
Aragón has given theater workshops in various parts of Mexico. For several years, she has been part of the campaign known as Lectura en voz alta, responsible for promoting reading with children and adults in rural regions of Mexico.

Aragón has been an intelligent and persistent political activist both outside and within her country. She has advocated against the sexual abuse of women, and for obtaining and promoting better working and socio-economic conditions for women. she has signed a large number of manifestos, alongside many other figures from literature, film, and both Mexican and international culture.

=== Personal life ===
When Aragón was 19 years old, she married Shajid, an Indian musician from Calcutta whom she met at a music festival in Mexico not long before. Shajid is currently in charge of the music department at the National Theatre in London. She lived in India for a year; the marriage ended soon after. In 1989, when Aragón was filming Goitia: un dios para si mismo in Zacatecas, she had an affair with an old friend from her youth, the historian Rodrigo Martinez. As a result of this relationship, her only daughter, María, was born.

== Filmography ==
=== Film ===
Year	Title	Role	Notes
1984	The Evil That Men Do	María	
1984	Toy Soldiers	Presidenta López	
1984	Samson and Delilah	Niji	Televisión film
1984	Dune	Bene Gesserit Sister	
1986	Los dos frailes	—N/a	
1987	Lamberto Quintero	María de Los Angeles	
1988	La furia de un dios	—N/a	
1988	Sabor a mí	—N/a	
1989	Goitia: un dios para si mismo	La Borelli	
1990	Pueblo de madera	Corner shop owner	
1992	Gertrudis	Pilar Molina	
1993	The Harvest	Dr. Emma	
1994	Novia que te vea	Sarica Mataraso	
1994	La señorita	La viuda	
1994	Ámbar	Armandina	
1995	A Walk in the Clouds	María José Aragón	
1995	En el aire	Teresa	
1996	Sucesos distantes	Irene Gorenko	
1996	Pensamientos	Flor	
1996	De muerte natural	Nicolasa	
1997	Cilantro y perejil	Teresa	
1998	Fibra óptica	Doña Carmen	
1999	Sexo, pudor y lágrimas	Carlos' mother	
2000	Picking Up the Pieces	Dolores	
2000	Entrela tarde y la noche	Minerva	
2000	Crónica de un desayuno	Estela	
2000	El grito	Blanca	
2000	¿Y si Cristobal despierta?	Mariana	
2002	The Crime of Padre Amaro	Agustina Sanjuanera	
2004	Dirty Dancing: Havana Nights	Mrs. Suárez	
2004	Desnudos	Diana's mother	
2004	Harry Potter and the Prisoner of Azkaban	Aunt Marge Dursley	Voice role Spanish Latin American version
2005	My Brother's Wife	Cristina	
2006	Bella	José's mother	
2007	Cañitas: presencia	Doña Elvia	
2008	La virgen negra	Lurdita	
2009	Looking for Palladin	Helen	
2009	From Mexico with Love	Rosa Villa	
2009	Todos hemos pecado	Woman in love	
2009	I Do ... Knot	Sebastián's mother	
2010	El atentado	Aunt Avelina	
2011	Tequila	Remedios	
2013	Cinco de Mayo: La Batalla	Doña Soledad	
2014	Todos están muertos	Paquita	
2014	Alicia en el país de María	Reyna	
2015	Elvira I Will Give You My Life But I'm Using It	Elvira's mother	
2015	Estar o no estar	Matrushka	
2016	Treintona, soltera y fantástica	Catalina	
2016	Mr. Pig	Chila	
2016	Moana	Grandmother Tala	Voice role Spanish Latin American version
2018	Don't Call Me Spinster	Tencha	Peruvian film
2019	Powder	Doña Mary	
2023	Unhappily Ever After	Grandmother	
2024	The Casagrandes Movie	Lupe	Voice role

=== Television ===
Year	Title	Role	Notes
1971	El amor tiene cara de mujer	—N/a	Episode: "#1.1"
1981	El hogar que yo robé	Genoveva Velarde-Aguirre	105 episodes
1982	Vanessa	Alejandra / Luisa	171 episodes
1982-1983	Chispita	Lucía	200 episodes
1983-1984	La fiera	La Costeña	230 episodes
1984	Principessa	Fernanda	143 episodes
1985	Vivir un poco	Andrea Santos de Merisa Obregón	165 episodes
1989	La casa al final de la calle	Leonor Altamirano Najera	170 episodes
1990	Días sin luna	Lucía	80 episodes
1990-1991	En carne propia	Magdalena Dumont de Muriel	185 episodes
1992	De frente al sol	Chole	98 episodes
1993-1994	Más allá del puente	Chole	100 episodes
1995	Agujetas de color de rosa	Bertha (1995-1996)	300 episodes
1996	Cañaveral de Pasiones	Josefina Rosales Vda. de Montero	3 episodes
1997	Mirada de mujer	María Inés Domínguez de San Millán	240 episodes
2000-2001	Todo por amor	Carmen Dávila	260 episodes
2003	Mirada de mujer, el regreso	María Inés Domínguez de San Millán	244 episodes
2005	Ni una vez más	Azalea	Episode: "#2.1"
2011	A corazón abierto	Dra. Elena Carrera	Episode: "#1.1"
2019	MotherFatherSon	Verónica	3 episodes
2020-2022	The Casagrandes	Lupe	Voice role 2 episodes
2022	El último rey	Delia Muñoz	30 episodes

==== Directing credits ====
Year	Title
1993	Madres egoístas
1996	Cañaveral de Pasiones
2001-2003	Lo que callamos las mujeres
