= Mirada de mujer =

- DVD poster
- Genre: Telenovela
- Based on: Señora Isabel by Bernardo Romero Pereiro and Mónica Agudelo
- Written by: Bernardo Romero Pereiro; Jimena Romero
- Directed by: Raúl Quintanilla Matiella; Jorge Ríos Villanueva; Antonio Serrano
- Creative director: Ariel Blanco
- Starring: Angélica Aragón; Ari Telch; Fernando Luján
- Theme music composer: Armando Manzanero
- Opening theme: "Dime" by Aranza
- Country of origin: Mexico
- Original language: Spanish
- No. of episodes: 240

Production
- Executive producers: Pedro Lira; Marcela Mejía; Myrna Ojeda
- Producers: María Auxiliadora Barrios; Maika Bernard; Epigmenio Ibarra; Carlos Payán; Hernán Vera
- Cinematography: Jorge Medina
- Editor: Marcos González
- Camera setup: Multi-camera
- Production company: TV Azteca

Original release
- Network: Azteca Trece
- Release: June 9, 1997 – June 5, 1998

Related
- Mirada de mujer, el regreso Victoria

Mirada de mujer (English: The Gaze of a Woman) is a Mexican telenovela premiered on Azteca Trece on June 9, 1997 and concluded on June 5, 1998. Based on the Colombian drama, entitled Señora Isabel written by Bernardo Romero Pereiro and Mónica Agudelo. The show is produced by Argos Comunicación and TV Azteca. It stars Angélica Aragón, Ari Telch, and Fernando Luján as the titular characters.

Following the success obtained, a sequel was released in 2003, titled Mirada de mujer, el regreso.

== Synopsis ==
A woman stops in front of a mirror, she questions herself, inquires into the traces that her eyes have become, and what she sees paralyzes her. The reflection on the crystal tells her of a story full of dreams, full of promises, children and prosperity, but empty of passion. It's the Story of Maria Ines, a woman in her 50s, her husband, his mistress 20-years-younger, her three adult children and a man 20 years younger, who'll help her discover that there is love and life after turning 50.

That woman is María Inés. Nothing of what has occurred in her 27 years of marriage was moved by her own dreams. Her entire life has been one of dedication to her husband and children. She is fifty and her husband has found in another woman, half his age, freshness and intimacy. To his mistress he gives the vitality he thought was lost, to his wife tiredness and failure. That man is Ignacio Sanmillán. María Inés look at her present and discovers loneliness, although Paulina, her best friend encourages her to keep on living. She is surrounded by complaining grown ups (her children) and a mother that tells her she has not been capable of keeping her family together. She is Mama Lena. But Maria Ines is not alone. Someone starts looking for her. A man who is 20 years younger. This man is Alejandro Salas. Writer, father of a boy, with an enormous desire to plat life a treat, Alejandro is a man that fights for his emotions and his work against hypocrisy, falsehood or prohibition.

María Inés is accompanied on her journey of self-discovery by her best friend, Paulina, who also begins to reflect on her life and reconsider her past decisions.

To make matters worse, her three children blame her for the break-up of the marriage of hers and their father, but Life will soon show them the truth.

== Theme song ==
The telenovela also gave rise to the song Dime written by Armando Manzanero, and sung by Aranza, which became a hit song in Mexico, Puerto Rico and Central America, and which peaked at #22 in the U.S. Hot Latin Songs Chart. To this date the song is considered by many as a classic, and one of the most important songs to come out of a telenovela, not only for its melody but also for its lyrics that fit the story.

The Philippine-dubbed airing however, had a different theme song, "Bakit" performed by Rachelle Ann Go.

== Cast ==
=== Main cast ===
- Angélica Aragón as María Inés
- Ari Telch as Alejandro
- Fernando Luján as Ignacio

=== Supporting cast ===
- Margarita Gralia as Paulina
- Evangelina Elizondo as Mamá Elena
- Verónica Langer as Rosario
- María Renée Prudencio as Adriana
- Bárbara Mori as Mónica
- Plutarco Haza as Andrés
- Olmo Araiza as Alex
- Álvaro Carcaño Jr as Nicolás
- René Gatica as Francisco
- Carmen Madrid as Marcela
- Carlos Torres Torrija as Marcos
- Paloma Woolrich as Consuelo
- Martha Mariana Castro as Daniela

== Awards and nominations ==
Year	Award	Category	Nominee(s)	Result
1998	TVyNovelas Awards	Best Telenovela	Epigmenio Ibarra; Carlos Payán	Nominated
1998	TVyNovelas Awards	Best Actress	Angélica Aragón	Won
1998	TVyNovelas Awards	Best Leading Actor	Fernando Luján	Nominated
1998	TVyNovelas Awards	Best Debut Actress	Bárbara Mori	Won
1998	El Heraldo de México Awards	Best Telenovela	Epigmenio Ibarra; Carlos Payán	Won
1998	El Heraldo de México Awards	Best Revelation	Plutarco Haza	Won
1999	Latin ACE Awards	Best Production	Epigmenio Ibarra	Won
1999	Latin ACE Awards	Best Actress	Angélica Aragón	Won
1999	Government of Puerto Rico	Special Award	Ari Telch	Won
