= Plutarco Haza =

Mexican actor

- Born: 22 June 1972 (age 54); Sonora, Mexico
- Occupation: Actor
- Years active: 1989–present
- Spouses: Ludwika Paleta (m. 1998; div. 2008) Ximena del Toro (m. 2014)
- Children: 2

Plutarco Haza (Spanish pronunciation: [pluˈtaɾko ˈasa]; born 22 June 1972) is a Mexican actor raised in Mazatlán, Sinaloa.

Haza produced and hosted the children's news show, Bizbirije on Canal 11. During the show's final year broadcast in 1998, he married the Polish-born Mexican actress Ludwika Paleta; they have one son named Nicolás. The couple separated in 2008. Haza remarried in 2014.

In 2015, Haza received a National Film Award (Premio Nacional de Cinematografía) for his career.

== Filmography ==
=== Films ===
Year	Title	Roles
1996	Cilantro y perejil	Francisco
2001	Atlético San Pancho	Alberto
2005	A Good Death Beats a Dull Life	Horacio
2006	Un mundo maravilloso	Political advisor
2006	Amor Xtremo	Eleazar
2008	Amor letra por letra	Carlos
2008	Under the Salt	Prefecto Dominguez
2010	Hidalgo: La historia jamás contada	Spanish captive
2011	Las razones del corazón	Javier
2013	Mi mejor regalo	Daniel
2014	Canon: Fidelidad al límite	Julián
2015	K9 World Cup	Polo Colmillo
2023	Héroes	José Cuellar
2026	Mexicali	Baptiste

=== Television ===
Year	Title	Roles	Notes
1995	Si Dios me quita la vida	Hugo	
1996	Bendita mentira	Dr. Sandoval	
1997	Mirada de mujer	Andrés San Millán	
1998	La casa del naranjo	Fausto Olmedo	
1999	Romántica obsesión	Óscar de la Rosa	
2000	Todo por amor	Javier Villegas	
2001	Lo que callamos las mujeres		Episode: "Alas rotas"
2001	Amores, querer con alevosía	Salvador	
2001	Cara o cruz	Martín Alcántara	
2002	El país de las mujeres	Bruno	
2003	Mirada de mujer: El regreso	Andrés San Millán	
2005	Machos	Alejandro "Alex" Mercader	
2007	Mientras haya vida	Rodrigo	
2008	Pobre rico, pobre	Maximiliano López Ferreira	
2010	Las Aparicio	Leonardo Villegas	
2013	Los secretos de Lucía	Arsenio Reina	
2014	Demente criminal	Camilo Celaya	
2014	En Otra Piel	Carlos Ricalde / Raúl Camacho	
2015-2020	El Señor de los Cielos	Dalvio "El Ingeniero" Navarrete	
2017	Perseguidos	Archibaldo Valencia / Ramón Lascuráin	
2018	El secreto de Selena	Carlos Valdez	
2019	Silvia Pinal, frente a ti	Gregorio Walerstein	
2019	No te puedes esconder	Alejandro Sánchez	
2022	Mujer de nadie	Rafael	
2022	Donde hubo fuego	Noe Serrano	
2023	Senda prohibida	Raymundo Corrales	
2023	El gallo de oro	Lorenzo Benavides	
2025	Cautiva por amor	Remigio Fuentes Mansilla	
2025-present	Dinastía Casillas	Dalvio Navarrete "El Ingeniero"	
