= Ari Telch =

Mexican actor (born 1962)

- Born: Ari Telch Benforado; May 7, 1962 (age 63); Mexico City, Mexico
- Occupation: Actor
- Years active: 1989–present

Ari Telch (born May 7, 1962) is a Mexican actor best known for his work in telenovelas and the stage.

== Early life and career ==
Ari Telch Benforado was born to a Jewish family and started acting career with the role of a Jewish boy in El violinista en el tejado (Fiddler on the Roof) with Manolo Fábregas. His next play was Yankee in 1983, produced by Sabina Berman, also of Jewish origin. In Barnum (1986), the play about one of the founders of the Barnum and Bailey circus he rode a monocycle of two meters high. In 1988, he obtained a role in Interés social, a play written by Luis Eduardo Reyes who obtained the National Theater Award for the story. A year later in Loco amor ("Fool for Love" by Sam Shepard) with Angélica Aragón.

== First telenovela with Televisa ==
In 1989, he participated in his first telenovela called Dos vidas ("Two lives") with Televisa. For his role he received a Best new actor award by both TVyNovelas and Eres magazines. In 1990, he made Flor y Canela on television and on stage Vamos a contar mentiras with Silvia Pinal and Querida aquí espantan of Joaquin Bissner.

The following year he joined the cast of Muchachitas, with a role that would give him fame and recognition earning a Best actor award by Eres magazine. Next year, he obtained the starring role in the stage version of La tarea in which he appeared fully nude with María Rojo the co-star of the film version. In spite of public protests the show was sold out and toured the country and obtained the award for Best actor. The same year he participated in El Contrabajo of Patrick Süskind adapted by Nathán Grinberg, who also wrote the music. For this play he obtained the award by the Asociación de Críticos Profesionales de Teatro (ACPT) and the Best actor award in the Festival Internacional de las Artes in Costa Rica. He made 2,500 presentations with this play in Mexico, the United States and Costa Rica. In 1993, he participated in the comedy Una pareja con ángel by Eduardo Palomo with 200 sold out presentations in the theater Xola in Mexico City. In the same year he also appeared in film with the production Novia que te vea.

Next year, he returned to Televisa with Imperio de cristal with María Rubio and the real-life couple Rebecca Jones and Alejandro Camacho. In 1995, he appeared in Cuatro Equis a play for which he wrote the original idea. The play made 800 presentations and gave him another Best actor award by the ACPT and El Heraldo de México. In 1996 he participated in La antorcha encendida with Televisa.

In 1997, he started his production company Telch Producciones, and its members are: Ari Telch, actor/director, Verónica Telch, executive producer, Nathan Grinberg, theatre director, José Manuel Bernal, public relations, Juan Christian Ortega, television producer, Norberto Garcia, technical manager, Luis Eduardo Reyes, consulting services, and Mauricio Pichardo, writer. Telch Producciones has, since then, produced several plays in Mexico. Telenovela producer Epigmenio Ibarra then invited him to star in TV Azteca's Mirada de Mujer (1997) with Angélica Aragón. A telenovela that would become a success in Mexico, Spain, Brazil, El Salvador, Venezuela, Puerto Rico and the United States. Because of this production, Telch and Aragón were featured on Time magazine and were awarded a recognition by the government of Puerto Rico.

In 1999, he hosted the show Chiquitos pero picosos on TV Azteca featuring, among other guests, Vicente Fox the President of Mexico. With his production company and in collaboration with Argos Comunicación he presented the sit-com Amor a las carreras. In 2001, he also presented the stand-up comedy El hermano incómodo co-starring with Leny Zundel. In 2003, his production company presented Contratiempo on stage in which he co-starred with Roxana Castellanos. He obtained for this play another Best actor award by the ACPT and Castellanos a Best new actress, and for Mauricio Pichardo Best script. Luis E. Reyes also received a nomination for Best director. The same year he returned to television with the sequel to Mirada de Mujer while touring the country with Contratiempo with more than 500 presentations. In 2005, he was part of the cast of the telenovela La otra mitad del sol and was touring with contratiempo.

Telch has a daughter with his former wife, actress Ninel Conde, whose name is Sofía (Ari and this daughter share their birthday date). In 2001, he married Brazilian model Marcia Da Cruz with whom he also has a daughter (Paulina).

He was studying to be a Dentist along with his 2 best friends David Ornelas (father of Carolina & Saul Ornelas) & Carlos Oynik, but he left it to be an actor.

Before marrying Ninel Conde, he dated Kate del Castillo.

As of 2010, Ari Telch is part of the cast of the telenovela Pasión Morena and he returned to the theater to play El contrabajo of Patrick Süskind directed by his brother Nathan Grinberg. Telch celebrates his 25th anniversary as an actor.

Telch has bipolar disorder.

== Stage ==
- El Chófer y la Señora Daisy ("Driving Miss Daisy", 2012-2013)
- El contrabajo (The Double Bass, 2009–2010)
- Ella en mi cabeza (2006)
- Contratiempo (2003)
- ¿Por qué no te quedas a desayunar?
- Cuatro Equis (1995)
- Una pareja con ángel (1993)
- El contrabajo (1992)
- La tarea (1992)
- Querida aquí espantan (1990)
- Vamos a contar mentiras (1990)
- Loco amor ("Fool for Love", 1989)
- Interés social (1988)
- Barnum (1987)
- Yankee (1983)
- El violinista en el tejado ("Fiddler in the Roof", 1976)

== Films ==
- Unhappily Ever After (2023) as Doctor Orozco
- Demasiado amor (2002) as Carlos
- El método (1999) as Rabbit-Man
- Novia que te vea (1994) as Jacobo
- Moon Spell (short, 1987)

== TV shows ==
- Amor a las carreras as Ricardo (1999)
- Chiquitos pero picosos (1999) as Host (1999)
- Hora Marcada (1986)
- Cachún cachún ra ra! (1981) as David (1985–1987)

== Telenovelas ==
- La bella y las bestias (2018) as Armando Quintero
- A Corazón Abierto (2012)
- Bajo el alma (2011)
- Pasión Morena (2009) as Llamita
- Mientras Haya Vida (2007) as Ignacio
- La Otra mitad del sol (2005) as Patricio Camacho
- Mirada de mujer: El regreso (2003) as Alejandro Salas
- El amor de mi vida (1998) as Jorge
- La antorcha encendida (1997) as Luis de Foncerrada
- Mirada de mujer (1997) as Alejandro Salas
- Imperio de Cristal (1995)
- Encuentro inesperado (1993)
- María Mercedes (1992) as Carlos Urbina
- Muchachitas (1991) as Joaquín
- La fuerza del amor (1990)
- Flor y canela (1989) as Tomas
- Dos vidas (1988)
- Rosa salvaje (1987) as Jorge
- Cicatrices del alma (1986) as Samuel
