= Carmen Beato =

Mexican actress

- Born: February 10, 1966 (age 60); Córdoba, Argentina
- Occupation: Actress
- Years active: 1980–present

Carmen Beato (born February 10, 1966) is a Mexican actress knows for her telenovelas of TV Azteca and Telemundo.

== Career ==
She was educated and graduated from the Centro Universitario de Teatro (CUT) of the UNAM. Among the awards she has received during her career are an Ariel for Best Actress for her performance in the film "En la mente del asesino", Best Actress in the film "La vida Inmune", awarded by the Accredited Journalists at the XXI Guadalajara International Film Festival, 2006; Pantalla de Cristal award for Best Actress for her performance in the film "El principio de la Espiral", Salvador Novo award in the category of Female Revelation in Theater for her performance in the play "Hace Tiempo". She was nominated for an Ariel Award for Best Female Co-Actress in the film "Los Parecidos", and nominated for a Silver Goddess Award for Best Actress in the film "Aquí entre nos".

Her other film work includes "La Atlántida" by Bárbara Ochoa, "Somos lo que hay", directed by Jorge Michel Grau (selected in Cannes for the Directors' Fortnight), "Te extraño" by Fabián Hofman, "Entre la noche y el día" by Bernardo Arellano, "Noches de Julio" by Axel Muñoz, among others. In television works include "Demencia", "El César", "Sincronía", "La taxista", "Guerra de ídolos", "Prisionero número uno", "Todo por amor", "Amores", "El país de las mujeres", "Mientras haya vida", "Contrato de amor", "Cielo Rojo", "La otra cara del alma", "Corazón en condominio", among others.

In 2015 she participated in the film Ladrones with Fernando Colunga, Eduardo Yáñez and Vadhir Derbez.

In addition to film and television, Beato has participated in more than ten plays working with directors such as Luis de Tavira, José Caballero, Héctor Mendoza, Alberto Lomnitz, Mario Espinosa.

== Filmography ==
=== Telenovelas ===
Year	Title	Role
2020	Oscuro deseo	Role Special
2018–2019	La Taxista	Emilia Laríos de Lizzaraga
2019	Preso No. 1	Hortensia Mateos de Alvarado
2017	Guerra de ídolos	Celestina del Solar
2013–2014	Corazón en condominio	Clara "Clarita de Dominguez
2012	La otra cara del alma	Elvira de Alba
2011	Cielo Rojo	Natalia "Nata" Aguilar
2010	La loba	Role Special
2008	Contrato de amor	Griselda
2007	Mientras haya vida	Elena
2004	Las Juanas	Carlota Galeana
2002	El país de las mujeres	Consuelo
2001	Amores, querer con alevosía	Angela

=== Films ===
- 1992 Mi querido Tom Mix
- 2000 Antes que anochezca
- 2002 Aro Tolbukhin En la mente del asesino
- 2006 Un mundo maravilloso
- 2008 High School Musical: El desafío (Mexican Film) – Angela
- 2010 We are What We are
- 2011 Bacalar
- 2011 Aquí entre nos
- 2012 Después de Lucía
- 2015 The Similars
- 2015 Ladrones – Josefa Ramirez
- 2016 7:19
