= K9 World Cup =

- Film poster
- Directed by: Carlos Pimentel; Nathan Sifuentes
- Screenplay by: Carlos Pimentel; Richard Pursel; Omar Mustre; Dulce Belchez
- Produced by: Verónica Arceo; Ricardo Arnaiz
- Starring: Fernando Luján; Plutarco Haza; Raúl Araiza; Maite Perroni; Pierre Angelo; Sergio Corona; Manuel Valdés; Gaspar Henaine "Capulina"; Jorge Campos, Alberto García Aspe; Luís Roberto Alves ("Zague"); Germán Villa; José Ramón Fernández; Enrique Bermúdez; Cristian Martinoli
- Production companies: Animex Producciones; Nahuala Films
- Distributed by: Gussi Films
- Release date: 24 April 2015
- Running time: 90 minutes
- Country: Mexico
- Language: Spanish

K9 World Cup (Spanish: Selección Canina) is a Mexican CGI sports comedy film, produced by Vero Arceo and Ricardo Arnaiz and directed by Nathan Sifuentes and Carlos Pimentel. The film is produced by Animex Producciones (under its Nahuala Films label), Imagination Films, and Clustertim.

The film features a large ensemble voice cast of Mexican actors led by Fernando Luján, Plutarco Haza, Raúl Araiza, Maite Perroni, Pierre Angelo, Sergio Corona, Manuel "Loco" Valdés and Gaspar Henaine "Capulina", with Mexican soccer players, Jorge Campos, Alberto García Aspe, Luis Roberto "Alves" Zague, Germán Villa, and Mexican sport journalists José Ramón Fernández, Enrique "El perro" Bermúdez and Cristian Martinoli as soccer commentators. The film's title is a reference to Mexico national football team, known as "Selección mexicana".

The film is distributed by Gussi Films. The film had its world premiere at the 22nd San Diego Latino Film Festival in San Diego, United States on 18 March 2015.

The film was released on 24 April 2015.

The English dub features the voices of Sean Astin, Ignacio Sandoval, Sandra Peña and Maurice LaMarche.

== Plot ==
After another failure that puts their classification at the CONCACAN Tournament at risk, the Mexicanine Team changes its coach. The chosen to take the helm of the team is the veteran Bernardo "Profe" Lapata, one of the star players who many years ago almost led to the triumph of the National Team in its best tournament in history, along with two great teammates: Cañón Colmillo and Lobo Perreda.

Lapata decides to summon new blood to the National Team and thus he meets by accident with Polo and Juancho, two great amateurs strikers, bound by something more than football/soccer. The great talent of Polo and Juancho will lead the National Team to the Grand Final of the Canine Cup, but both will have to overcome their great egos and personalism to learn to play as a team and thus achieve the much desired Cup.

== Release ==
The film's teaser was released on 24 July 2014.

== Production ==
The original idea comes from Carlos Pimentel who began working with Arnaiz in the story since July 2009.

== See also ==
- Dog City
- Hoze Houndz
- Dogtanian and the Three Muskehounds
