= Yo no creo en los hombres =

1991 Mexican telenovela

- Genre: Telenovela
- Created by: Original Story: Caridad Bravo Adams; Adaptation: Marcia del Río
- Directed by: Miguel Córcega; Francisco Franco
- Starring: Gabriela Roel; Alfredo Adame; Rafael Rojas
- Theme music composer: Pepe Stephens; Annette Fradera
- Opening theme: "Instrumental"
- Ending theme: "Yo no creo en los hombres" by Imelda Miller
- No. of episodes: 81

Production
- Executive producer: Lucy Orozco
- Producer: Isabelle Tardán
- Production locations: Mexico City, Mexico
- Cinematography: Juan Antonio Sagredo

Original release
- Network: Canal de las Estrellas
- Release: June 10 – September 30, 1991

Related
- No creo en los hombres (1969); Yo no creo en los hombres (2014); Yo no creo en los hombres (2026)

Yo no creo en los hombres is a 1991 Mexican telenovela produced by Lucy Orozco for Televisa. The series starred Gabriela Roel, Alfredo Adame, and Lyn May in protagonist roles. It is based on the radionovela Yo no creo en los hombres written by Caridad Bravo Adams.

== Plot ==
The protagonist of the plot is María Dolores Robledo (Gabriela Roel), a young and beautiful woman, whose fate intersects with that of the Ibáñez family, made up of the evil Leonor (Saby Kamalich) and her two children, Arturo (Rafael Rojas) and Maleny (Ana Colchero). María Dolores falls in love with Arturo, who seduces her and later leaves her to marry another woman.

Later, Arturo tries to rape María Dolores, but he accidentally dies during the struggle between them and she is blamed for his death and sentenced to thirty years in prison.

While in prison, María Dolores swears to herself not to trust men anymore, but after regaining her freedom, she meets Gustavo (Alfredo Adame), a lawyer who falls in love with her and makes her believe in love again.

== Cast ==
=== Main cast ===
- Gabriela Roel as María Dolores Robledo
- Alfredo Adame as Gustavo Miranda
- Rafael Rojas as Arturo Ibáñez

=== Also main cast ===
- Saby Kamalich as Leonor Ibáñez
- Bruno Rey as Pedro Miranda
- Óscar Morelli as Lawyer Salas
- Bárbara Gil as Laura Miranda
- Martha Navarro as Esperanza Robledo
- Ana Colchero as Maleny Ibáñez
- Pilar Escalante as Silvia Montesinos
- Luisa Huertas as Josefa García
- Patricia Bernal as Susana

=== Recurring cast ===
- Hugo Acosta as Tony
- Yolanda Andrade as Clara Robledo
- Jorge Antolín as José Alberto
- Felipe Casillas as Jacinto
- Dora Cordero as Cecilia
- Alberto Estrella as Alfonso
- Astrid Hadad as Paca
- Leonor Llausás as Honoria
- Alejandro Rábago as Aurelio
- Federica Sánchez Fogarty as Elena García
- Ricardo Silva as Dr. Herrera
- José Suárez as Leonardo Miranda
- José Luis Yaber as Genaro
- Humberto Yáñez as Raúl Gómez
