= Carmen Madrid =

Mexican actress and writer

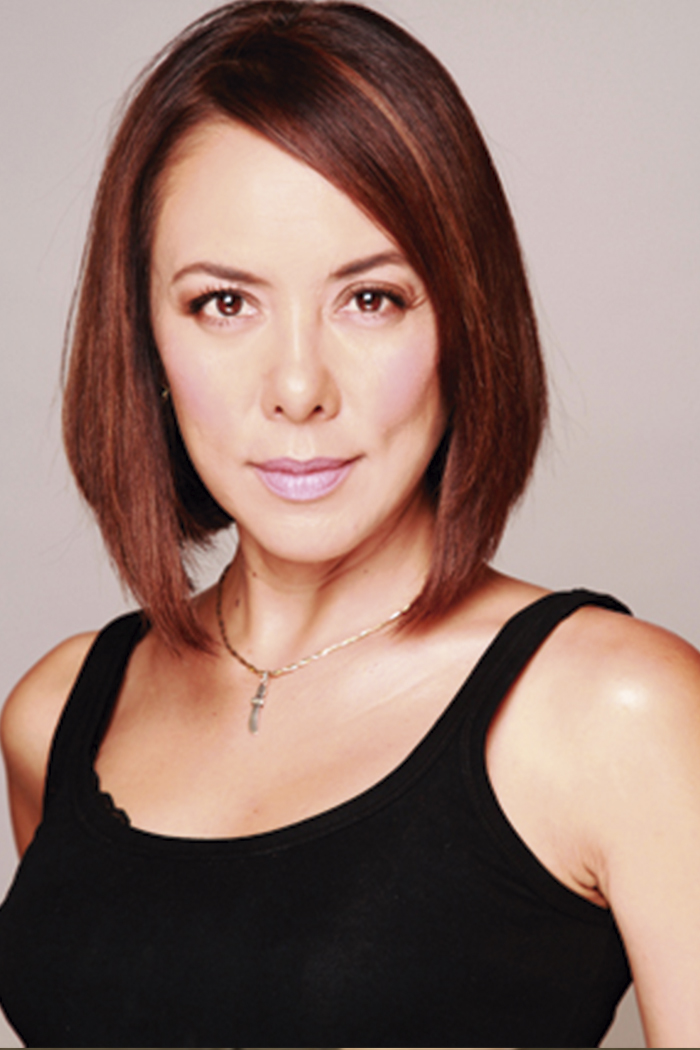
- Occupations: Actress, writer
- Years active: 1991–Retired
- Known for: Born on 1971 Feb 7

Carmen Madrid is a Mexican actress and writer. She is best known for her work as Clara in Nicotina, for which she received an Ariel Award for Best Actress despite the fact that she is most recognized for her appearances in telenovela. She recently portrayed Silvia Pinal in La Guzmán, a biographical drama series about Alejandra Guzmán.

== Selected filmography ==
=== As writer ===
Year	Title	Notes
2008–2012	Capadocia	8 episodes
2013	Prohibido amar	90 episodes
2016	El hotel de los secretos	81 episodes
2017	La doble vida de Estela Carrillo	72 episodes
2017	Las Malcriadas	35 episodes

=== Film roles ===
Year	Title	Roles	Notes
1991	Mujer de cabaret	Inmate 2	
1997	Men with Guns	Ángela	
2002	The Virgin of Lust	Imelda	
2003	Lucía, Lucía	Store customer 1	
2003	Nicotina	Clara	Nominated—Ariel Awards for Best Actress
2006	Un mundo maravilloso	Economic Reporter	
2016	Un Cuento de Circo & A Love Song	Trapeze artist	

=== Television roles ===
Year	Title	Roles	Notes
1990	Hora marcada	Guest	Episode: "En el cuarto de arriba"
1997	Mirada de mujer	Marcela	
1999	Cuentos para solitarios	Claudia	Episode: "Infidelis"
2000	Todo por amor	Marlene	
2002	El país de las mujeres	Yaya	
2004	Gitanas	Ofelia	
2005	Amor en custodia	Gabriela	25 episodes
2006	Montecristo	Mercedes Cortés	
2007	Mientras haya vida	Natalia	
2009	Eternamente tuya	Ernestina	
2009	Lo que callamos las mujeres	Catalina	Episode: "Prisionera de mi cuerpo"
2011	A corazón abierto	Miranda Carvajal	
2013	Vivir a destiempo	Karina Gómez	
2014	Sr. Ávila	Mauro's mother	Episode: "The Boss of the Bosses"
2014–2015	Señora Acero	Cornelia Ríos	Recurring role (season 1); 50 episodes
2016	La querida del Centauro	Mariela Acosta	Recurring role (season 1); 18 episodes
2016	Un día cualquiera	Paola	Episode: "Conductores De TV"
2016	La Hermandad	Virginia	
2017	Como dice el dicho	Unknown role	Episode: "A donde va Vicente, va toda la gente"
2017	Paquita la del Barrio	Rosa	
2019	La Guzmán	Silvia Pinal	
2019	Los elegidos	Rosa Domínguez	Series regular; 34 episodes
