= La brújula rota =

Mexican telenovela

- Genre: Telenovela; Drama
- Directed by: Manolo Calvo
- Country of origin: Mexico
- Original language: Spanish
- No. of episodes: 60

Original release
- Network: Telesistema Mexicano
- Release: 1961 – 1961

Related
- Bajo la sombra de los almendros; Cielo sin estrellas

La brújula rota (English: The broken compass) is a Mexican telenovela produced by Televisa and transmitted by Telesistema Mexicano.

Jorge Mistral and Ariadna Welter starred as protagonists, Guillermo Zetina starred as main antagonist.

== Cast ==
- Jorge Mistral
- Ariadna Welter
- José Gálvez
- Guillermo Zetina
- Elda Peralta
- Andrea Palma
- Elsa Cárdenas
- Emilio Brillas
- Madaleine Vivo
