= Laura Palma =

Mexican actress

Laura Palma (born January 30, 1985, in Mexico City, Mexico) is a Mexican actress and model. She studied acting in Centro de Formacion Actoral of TV Azteca.

== Filmography ==
Television
Year	Title	Role	Notes
2019	La Guzman	Viridiana Alatriste	
2012	Los Rey	Lucia del Muro	
2011-2012	A Corazón Abierto	Isabel Heredia	
2010	Quiéreme Tonto	Laura	
2010	Lo que callamos las mujeres		
2010	A Cada Quien Su Santo		
