= María José (1978 TV series) =

Mexican telenovela

- Genre: Telenovela
- Created by: Arturo Moya Grau
- Directed by: Miko Viya
- Starring: Fanny Cano; Fernando Luján
- Country of origin: Mexico
- Original language: Spanish

Original release
- Network: Canal de las Estrellas
- Release: 1978

Related
- María José (1975)

María José is a Mexican telenovela writing by Arturo Moya Grau in 1978.

Is an adaptation of the Chilean telenovela María José produced in 1975 by Canal 13.

== Cast ==
- Fanny Cano as María José
- Fernando Luján as El Jaiba
- Leonardo Daniel as Alfredo
- Gregorio Casals as Pablo
- Blanca Sánchez as Nadia
- Antonio Medellín
- Víctor Junco
- Maria Eugenia Avendaño
- Virginia González
- Sonia Esquivel
- Susana Dosamantes
