= Yankee (TV series) =

Mexican Spanish-language drama TV series

- Genre: Drama
- Created by: Diego Enrique Osorno
- Starring: Julio Casado; Sebastián Ferrat; Jana Raluy
- Country of origin: Mexico
- Original languages: Spanish; English
- No. of seasons: 1
- No. of episodes: 25

Production
- Production company: Argos Comunicación

Original release
- Network: Netflix
- Release: June 14, 2019

Yankee is a 2019 Mexican Spanish-language television drama series created by Diego Enrique Osorno and starring Julio Casado, Sebastián Ferrat and Jana Raluy. The plot revolves around Malcolm Moriarty (Pablo Lyle), a young entrepreneur from Arizona who is on the run from the police. He crosses the border into Mexico and gets involved in drug dealing with modern technology, becoming their American associate.

It was ordered direct-to-series, and the first season premiered on Netflix streaming on June 14, 2019.

== Cast ==
- Pablo Lyle as Malcolm Moriarty
- Sebastián Ferrat as Cara Sucia
- Julio Casado as Del Toro
- Jana Raluy as Governor Nelly
- Ana Layevska as Laura Wolf
- Pamela Almanza as Phoebe Moriarty
- Aldo Verástegui as Alacrán

== Release ==
The full first season consisting of 25 episodes premiered on Netflix streaming on June 14, 2019.
