= Irene Azuela =

Mexican actress and producer (born 1979)

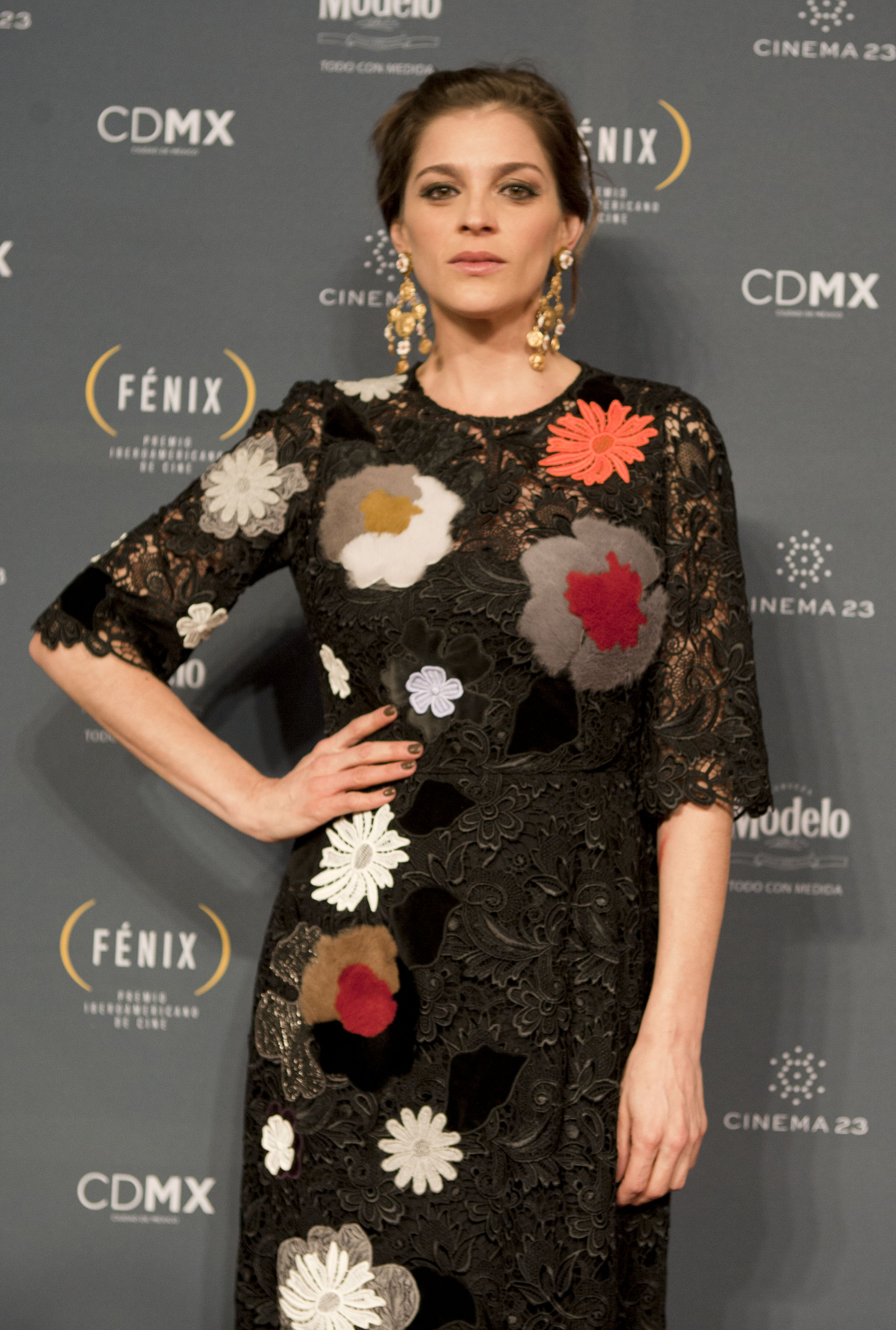
- Born: October 27, 1979 (age 46); London, England
- Occupations: Actress, producer
- Years active: 2000–present
- Children: 1

Irene Azuela (born October 27, 1979) is a Mexican actress and producer.

== Career ==
Irene Azuela began her career as an actress in 2000's in TV Azteca with three telenovelas: Todo por amor, Amores querer con alevosía and La otra mitad del sol. She began to make films in 2007 in the film El búfalo de la noche, written by Guillermo Arriaga. In 2008 she won as best actress in the Ariel Awards for the film Quemar las Naves. She was the producer of the Canal Once series, Paramedicos. She has participated in several theater plays such as: La Gaviota, Salomé and La obra sangrienta written by Oscar Wilde.

== Personal life ==
Azuela has a daughter, born on March 13, 2015, with her current partner Enrique "Quique" Rangel, bass player of Café Tacuba.

== Filmography ==
Film
Year	Title	Role	Notes
2006	La última vez	Ella	Short film
2007	El búfalo de la noche	Margarita	
2007	Es muy fácil	Alicia	Short film
2007	Quemar las Naves	Helena	
2008	Violanchelo	Gaby	
2008	Tear This Heart Out	Bárbara	
2008	Under the Salt	Isabel	
2010	Sucedió en un día	Úrsula	Segment "Amor a primera vista"
2010	El atentado	Cordelia Godoy	
2011	Miss Bala	Jessica Verduzo	
2011	Así es la suerte	Mónica	
2012	El Santos vs. La Tetona Mendoza	Rat Ling / Siren Lupe	Voice
2013	The Last Call	Julia	
2014	The Obscure Spring	Pina	
2017	Cuando los hijos regresan	Daniela	
2017	Opus Zero	Maia	
2020	Nahui		
2021	Los Dias Que No Estuve	Sofía	

Television
Year	Title	Role	Notes
2000	Todo por amor	Marisol	
2000	Amores, querer con alevosía	Rocío Morales	
2001	Lo que callamos las mujeres	Celeste	Episode: "Con los ojos del alma"
2005	La otra mitad del sol	Dulce	
2010	Gritos de muerte y libertad	Ana Huarte	3 episodes
2010	Capadocia	Azucena Montiel	4 episodes
2011	Bienvenida realidad	Lucía Fuentes	
2011	El encanto del águila	María del Carmen Serdán	Episode: "Los Mártires de Puebla"
2012–2018	Paramédicos	Elisa Gaona	Producer; 14 episodes
2014	No se culpe a nadie de mi vida	Documentary Host	Television film
2015	Sense8	Cristina	2 episodes
2016	La querida del Centauro	Tania Muñoz	Lead role; 43 episodes
2016	El hotel de los secretos	Isabel Alarcón	Lead role; 80 episodes
2019	Monarca	Ana María Carranza	Lead role; 18 episodes

== Awards and nominations ==
Year	Award	Category	Works	Result
2008	Ariel Award	Best Actress	Quemar las Naves	Won
2009	Ariel Award	Best Actress	Under the Salt	Won
2015	Ariel Award	Best Actress	Las oscuras primaveras	Nominated
2015	Miami International Film Festival	Best Performance (shared with cast)	Las oscuras primaveras	Won
2017	Premios TVyNovelas	Best Actress	El hotel de los secretos	Nominated
