= Día de muertos (film) =

- Directed by: Luis Alcoriza
- Written by: Luis Alcoriza; Fernando Galiana
- Produced by: Luis García de León
- Starring: Pedro Weber; Manuel "Flaco" Ibáñez; Carmen Salinas; Adalberto Martínez; María Rojo; Sergio Ramos; Patricia Rivera; Ernesto Gómez Cruz; Leticia Perdigón; Edgardo Gazcón; Eugenia Avendaño; Fernando Luján
- Cinematography: Rosalío Solano
- Edited by: Carlos Savage
- Music by: Pedro Plascencia
- Production company: Televicine
- Distributed by: Televicine
- Release date: 27 October 1988 (Mexico)
- Running time: 90 minutes
- Country: Mexico
- Language: Spanish

Día de muertos ("Day of the Dead"), also known as Día de difuntos and Los hijos de la guayaba, ("The Children of the Guava") is a 1988 Mexican comedy-drama film directed by Luis Alcoriza. It is Alcoriza's penultimate film as director and his last one made entirely in Mexico; his last film directed, La sombra del ciprés es alargada, was a Mexican-Spanish co-production.

== Plot ==
In a cemetery on the Day of the Dead, the lawyer Talamantes is going to place a cross on his mother's grave. There, he meets with other assistants who commemorate his relatives: a bricklayer, a poet, the shoemaker Zacarías, the plumber Baltazar and the hairdresser Pedro, with their respective families. In the heat of alcohol, they all argue, show their weaknesses, resolve disagreements in couples, fight, flirt, reconcile and swear each other eternal friendship.

== Cast ==
- Pedro Weber as Baltazar (as Pedro Weber "Chatanuga")
- Manuel "Flaco" Ibáñez as Zacarías
- Carmen Salinas as Cholita
- Adalberto Martínez as The Thief (as Adalberto Martinez "Resortes")
- María Rojo as Yolanda
- Sergio Ramos as Pedro (as Sergio Ramos "El Comanche")
- Patricia Rivera
- Ernesto Gómez Cruz as The Poet
- Leticia Perdigón as Martha
- Edgardo Gazcón as Salvador
- Eugenia Avendaño as Enriqueta
- Fernando Luján as Francisco de Jesús Talamantes
- Raúl Araiza as Beto
- Héctor Suárez

== Analysis ==
In an interview collected in the book Memorias de posguerra: Diálogos con la cultura del exilio by Manuel García García, director Luis Alcoriza described his film thus, "[L]a película salió muy dura. Era una agresión frontal al sistema y a la moral dominante. Había una burla agresiva a la muerte que superaba la crítica común del mexicano." ("The movie came out very hard. It was a frontal assault on the dominant system and morals. There was an aggressive mockery of death that surpassed the common criticism of the Mexican.") He added, "La gente se asustó un poco. La peícula es divertida pero con un fondo violento. Abordé el tema de la figura de la madre de manera muy frontal y eso aquí no está bien visto." ("People got a little scared. The movie is funny but with a violent background. I approached the subject of the figure of the mother in a very frontal way and that here is not well seen.")

== See also ==
- Day of the Dead
