= Yo no creo en los hombres (2026 TV series) =

- Genre: Drama
- Based on: Yo no creo en los hombres by Caridad Bravo Adams
- Written by: Janely Lee Torres; Ana Granados; María Cervantes Balmori
- Directed by: Mauricio Meneses
- Starring: Valentina Buzzurro; Paulina Matos; Adolfo de la Fuente; José Pablo Minor
- Country of origin: Mexico
- Original language: Spanish
- No. of seasons: 1
- No. of episodes: 11

Production
- Executive producers: Abraham Mancilla; Héctor Sotelo Blancas
- Cinematography: David Fernández Díaz
- Editor: Rigel Sosa Andrade
- Camera setup: Multi-camera
- Production companies: TelevisaUnivision; Argos Televisión

Original release
- Network: Vix
- Release: 30 October 2026

Related
- Yo no creo en los hombres (1991); Yo no creo en los hombres (2014)

Yo no creo en los hombres is a Mexican television series produced by Argos Televisión for TelevisaUnivision. It is based on the radionovela of the same name written by Caridad Bravo Adams. It stars Valentina Buzzurro, José Pablo Minor and Adolfo de la Fuente. The series was released on Vix on 30 October 2026.

== Cast ==
=== Main ===
- Valentina Buzzurro as Julieta
- Paulina Matos as Sofía Riva Palacios
- Adolfo de la Fuente as Emiliano
- José Pablo Minor as Arturo
- Cecilia Gabriela as Leonor
- Marisol del Olmo as Lucía
- Lourdes Munguía as Amelia
- Martijn Kuiper as Nicolás
- Sandra Destenave
- Alejandra Zaid as Daniela
- Ruy Senderos

=== Recurring and guest stars ===
- Itza Sodi
- Ignacio Riva Palacio
- Constantino Morán
- Teresa Ibarra
- Rafaella López
- David Aguiar
- Esmeralda Velázquez
- Bren Anaya
- Gala Audelo
- Nina Cookingham
- Sachi Tamashiro

== Production ==
Filming of the series began in January 2026 and lasted five weeks.

== Episodes ==
No.	Title	Original release date
1	"El amor sí existe"	30 October 2026
2	"Todas tus promesas"	30 October 2026
3	"Que vivan los novios"	30 October 2026
4	"Vas a hacer lo que yo diga"	30 October 2026
5	"No me toques"	30 October 2026
6	"Yo sólo me defendí"	30 October 2026
7	"Nadie es inocente"	30 October 2026
8	"Confía"	30 October 2026
9	"La verdad no es suficiente"	30 October 2026
10	"Cuando las mujeres hablan"	30 October 2026
11	"Volver a ver el sol"	30 October 2026
