= Between Us (2011 film) =

- Theatrical release poster
- Directed by: Patricia Martínez de Velasco
- Written by: Patricia Martínez de Velasco
- Produced by: Julio Bárcenas; Laura Imperiale; Patricia Martínez de Velasco; Roberto Sneider
- Starring: Jesús Ochoa; Carmen Beato
- Cinematography: Paula Huidobro
- Edited by: Óscar Figueroa
- Music by: Victor Hernandez Stumpfhauser; Liz Martell
- Production companies: La Banda Films; Cuevano Films
- Distributed by: Corazón Films
- Release dates: March 2011 (GIFF); August 26, 2011 (WFF); March 30, 2012 (Mexico)
- Running time: 110 minutes
- Country: Mexico
- Language: Spanish
- Box office: $2,336,212

Between Us (Spanish: Aquí entre nos, lit. 'Here between us') is a 2011 Mexican comedy film written, directed and co-produced by Patricia Martínez de Velasco in her directorial debut. Starring Jesús Ochoa and Carmen Beato. It was named on the shortlist for Mexico's entry for the Academy Award for Best Foreign Language Film at the 85th Academy Awards, but it was not selected.

== Synopsis ==
Rodolfo, who is surrounded by women: his three daughters, his wife and his lover, decides to put a stop to certain circumstances in his life and falls into a crisis that destroys the stability of the entire family.

== Cast ==
The actors participating in this film are:

- Jesús Ochoa as Rodolfo
  - Martín Altomaro as Young Rodolfo
- Carmen Beato as Miriam
  - Fernanda Borches as Young Fernanda
- Diana García as Sofía
- Giovana Fuentes as Victoria
- Giovanna Zacarías as Cecilia
- Camila Risser as Ana Paula
- Norma Angélica as Amalia
- Veronica Aranda as Ballet teacher
- Julio Bracho as Javier
- Julio Casado as Miriam's Lawyer
- Patricio Castillo as Leonard
- Alejandro Cuétara as Buyer
- Fernando del Paso as Nacho
- Elia Domensain as Ms. Executive
- Veronica Falcón as Elsa, real estate salesperson
- Álvaro Guerrero as Toño
- Lisardo Guarinos as Marcos Acosta

== Release ==
It had its international premiere at the end of March 2011 at the 26th Guadalajara International Film Festival, then premiered on August 26, 2011, at the 35h Montreal World Film Festival. It was commercially released on March 30, 2012, in Mexican theaters.

== Accolades ==
Year	Award / Festival	Category	Recipient	Result	Ref.
2011	Guadalajara International Film Festival	Best Actor	Jesús Ochoa	Won	
2011	Montreal World Film Festival	Golden Zenith	Patricia Martínez de Velasco	Nominated	
2011	Montreal World Film Festival	Bronze Zenith	Patricia Martínez de Velasco	Won	
2011	Huelva Ibero-American Film Festival	Best Feature Film - Audience Award	Patricia Martínez de Velasco	Won	
2011	Huelva Ibero-American Film Festival	Best Screenplay	Patricia Martínez de Velasco	Won	
2012	Newport Beach Film Festival	Best Foreign Feature - Audience Award	Patricia Martínez de Velasco	Won	
2013	Canacine Awards	Best Advertising Campaign	Corazón Films	Nominated	
2013	Diosas de Plata	Best Actress	Carmen Beato	Nominated	
2013	Diosas de Plata	Best First Work	Patricia Martínez de Velasco	Nominated	
2013	Diosas de Plata	Best Original Song	Liz Martell ("Soy libre")	Nominated	
