= Carlos Payán =

Mexican writer and politician (1929–2023)

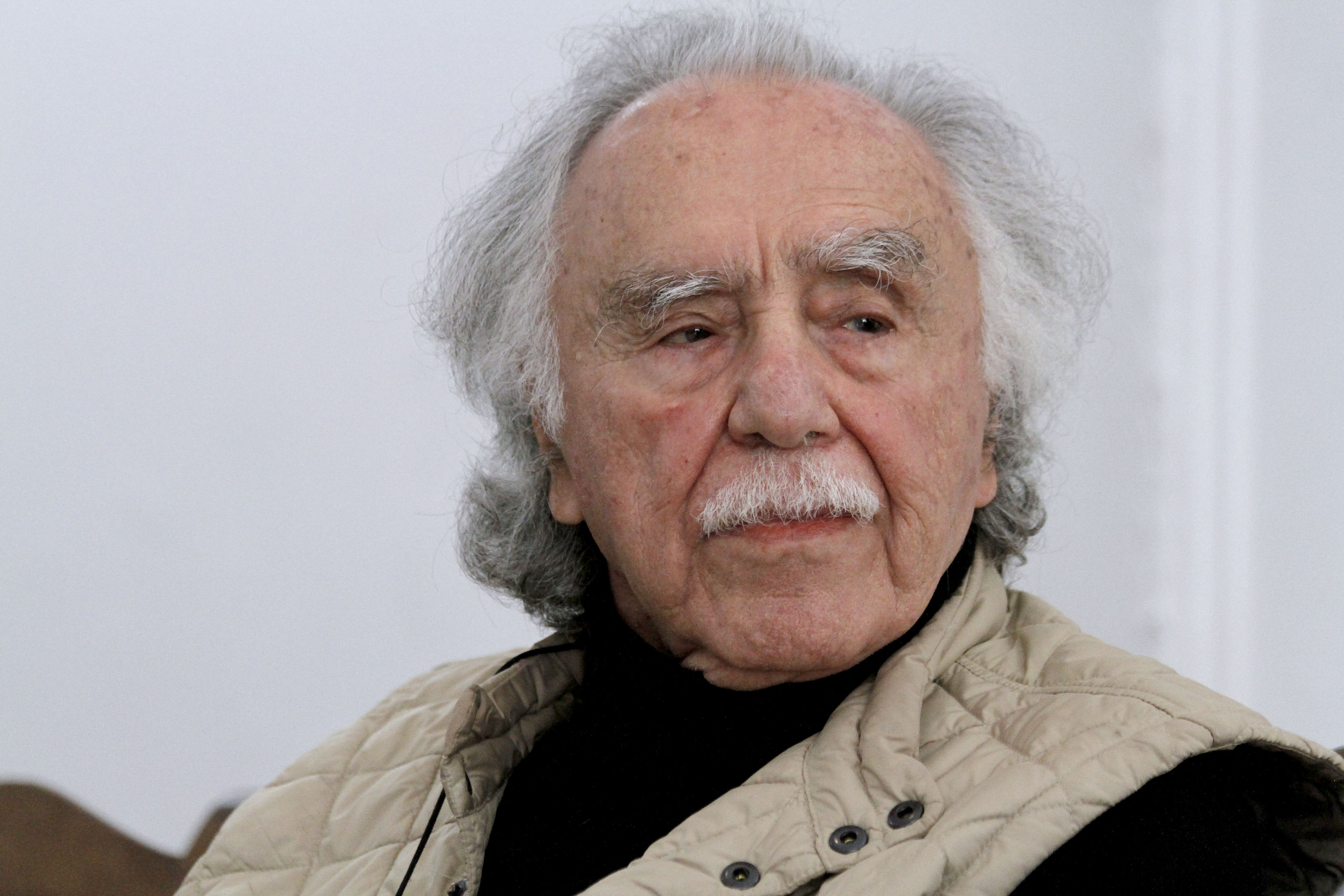
In 2018

Carlos Payán Velver (2 February 1929 – 17 March 2023) was a Mexican writer, journalist and politician.

In 1984 he founded the Mexico City daily newspaper La Jornada. In 1992 he founded and partially owned the media company Argos Media Group, which produced telenovelas, TV shows and films.

He was a senator from 1997 to 2000, elected by the proportional representation mechanism for the Party of the Democratic Revolution (PRD).

In 2018, the Mexican Senate awarded him the Belisario Domínguez Medal of Honour for his "unwavering defence of free expression and human rights".
