= Rodrigo Abed =

Mexican actor

- Born: Rodrigo Elias Martínez Abed; September 6, 1970 (age 55); Mexico City
- Occupation: singer

Rodrigo Elias Martínez Abed, best known as Rodrigo Abed (Spanish pronunciation: [roˈðɾiɣo aˈβeð]; born September 6, 1970) is a telenovela and film actor. He is best known as "Fabián Sanchez Serrano" in Cuando seas mia.

== Career ==
He studied acting at the "Centro de Educación Artística" (Artistic Education Center) of Televisa in Mexico, where he is the student of Sergio Jimenez and Oscar nominated actress, Adriana Barraza. He was part of Star System of Televisa.

== Actor ==
=== Film ===
- 2005 Cicatrices
- 2003 Dark Waters

=== Telenovela ===
- La mexicana y el güero (2020) - Gonzalo Heredia
- Silvia Pinal, frente a ti (2019) - Psicólogo
- El Chapo (2017) - Amado
- El Chema (2017) - Cesár Silva de la Garza "El Presidente (The President)"
- Amor sin reserva (2014-2015) - Jorge Castillo
- Las trampas del deseo (2013-2014) - Gerardo Alvarado
- El señor de los cielos (2013) - Cesár Silva de la Garza "El Presidente (The President)"
- A corazón abierto (2011-2012) - Javier Burgos
- Secretos del alma (2008 - 2009) - Roberto Suárez
- Top Models (2005) - Brandon Oliver
- La hija del jardinero (2003) - Guillermo
- Mirada de mujer: El regreso (2003) - Elias Tanus
- Súbete a mi moto (2002)
- Cuando seas mía (2001 - 2002) - Fabián Sánchez Serrano Vallejo
- Besos prohibidos (1999) - Adalberto Conde
- La Mentira (1998) - Ricardo Platas †
- Mujer, casos de la vida real (1997-1998) - Varios capítulos
- Cañaveral de pasiones (1996) - Guillermo Elizondo
- Morir dos veces (1996)
- María la del Barrio (1995 - 1996) - Bernardo Garduño
- El premio mayor (1995 - 1996) - Gustavo
- Bajo un mismo rostro (1995) - Mario Contreras
- Sueño de amor (1993)
- Mágica juventud (1992) - "El puas"
