= A corazón abierto (Mexican TV series) =

Mexican telenovela

- Genre: Medical drama
- Created by: Shonda Rhimes; Fernando Gaitán; Season 2: Luis Felipe Ybarra
- Developed by: RCN Television Colombia; RCN Telenovelas: Alberto Santini Lara; Elisa Salinas; Disney Media Networks; Vista Productions (Season 1 only)
- Written by: Season 1: Fernando Gaitán; Season 2: José Luis Duran; Luis Felipe Ybarra
- Directed by: Raul Quintanilla; Julian Atuñano; Season 1: Wiliam Barragan
- Starring: Sergio Basañez; Iliana Fox; Rodrigo Abed; Leonardo Garcia; Fran Meric; Luis Ernesto Franco; Laura Palma; Adrian Rubio; Fabiana Perzabal; Alejandro Lukini; Luis Miguel Lombana; Carmen Madrid; Angelica Aragon
- Theme music composer: Mauricio Abaroa
- Opening theme: "Vive" by Marta Sánchez and Samuel Castelli
- Country of origin: Colombia
- Original language: Spanish
- No. of episodes: 138

Production
- Executive producers: Disney Media Latin Networks: Fernando Barbosa; Leonardo Aranguibel; Season 1: Alberto Santini Lara; Yuldor Gutiérrez; Season 2: Pedro Lira; Pedro Luevano
- Producers: Season 1: Juan David Burns; Season 2: Elisa Salinas
- Production locations: Bogotá, Colombia
- Camera setup: Multi-camera
- Running time: 42 minutes
- Production companies: RCN Television; Azteca; Disney Media Networks Latin America

Original release
- Network: Azteca Trece
- Release: 9 November 2011 – 25 May 2012

Related
- Grey's Anatomy, Private Practice, A Corazón Abierto (Colombian telenovela)

A Corazón Abierto is a Mexican telenovela produced by RCN Television in collaboration with Vista Production (first season only) and Disney Media Network Latin America. Based on Shonda Rhimes' Grey's Anatomy, it is adapted and supervised by Colombian writer, Fernando Gaitán. It marks the return of Sergio Basañez as a protagonist with the presentation of Iliana Fox as a protagonist. It also marks the return of Angélica Aragón to the television screen after 8 years of abstinence, since El Regreso, Juan David Burns as producer, and Raul Quintanilla as director. It was originally planned to air on Azteca 7, but was changed to Azteca 13, replacing Emperatriz, on 9 November 2011. It was filmed in Colombia for eight months, from February to October 2011. In December 2011, Azteca 13 executives extended the novela for another 58 episodes, making a total of 138 episodes. 2012 episodes are filmed in Mexico, instead of Colombia. Elisa Salinas replaced her husband, Juan David Burns, as the producer in the second season. Filming of the second season ended on 17 April. Due to successful public reception, the producers plans for another season. The executives of Azteca discussed with Disney Media Networks for a third season, but later cancelled the idea.

== Cast ==
=== Main cast ===
Cast	Character Original character in Grey's Anatomy	Description	Status
Sergio Basañez	Andrés Guerra; Derek Shepherd	Neurosurgeon.	Protagonist
Iliana Fox	María Alejandra Rivas Carrera; Meredith Grey	First year intern in Season1, later third year intern in Season 2.	Protagonist
Rodrigo Abed	Javier Burgos; Preston Burke	Cardiologist.	Protagonist
Leonardo García	Bruno Bautista; Owen Hunt		Episode 92
Fabiana Perzabal	Alicia Durán; Addison Forbes Montgomery	Gynecologist.	Until episode 79
Alejandro Lukini	Mauricio Hernández; Mark Sloan	Plastic surgeon. Was Andres' best friend. Slept with Alicia.	Main villain in season 1. Until episode 79
Fran Meric	Cristina Solorzano; Cristina Yang	First year intern in Season1, later third year intern in Season 2.	Protagonist
Luis Ernesto Franco	Augusto Maza; Alex Karev	First year intern in Season1, later third year intern in Season 2.	
Laura Palma	Isabel Heredia; Isobel "Izzie" Stevens	First year intern in Season1, later third year intern in Season 2.	
Adrián Rubio	Jorge Valenzuela; George O'Malley	First year intern in Season1, later third year intern in Season 2. Claudia's husband, Diego's father.	
Johanna Morales	Claudia Torres; Callie Torres	Orthopedic surgeon. Jorge's wife, Diego's mother. Has cancer in season 2.	Episode 40–93.
Luis Miguel Lombana	Ricardo Cepeda; Richard Webber	Head of surgery	
Carmen Madrid	Miranda Carvajal; Miranda Bailey	Season 1: Third year intern, chief of first year interns.	
José Carlos Rodríguez	Germán de la Garza	Hospital administrator.	
Ángela Fuste	Lucia Serrano	Hospital lawyer	Recurring special appearance in season 1, regular main cast in season 2
Luis Arrieta	Damian Velasco	First year intern in season 2. Epileptic.	Since episode 80
Lia Ferre	Carmela "La Comihombre" Wanles	First year intern in season 2.	Since episode 80
Maria Alejandra Molina	Aura Zorrilla Martin del Campo	First year intern in season 2.	Since episode 80
German Girotti	Eliseo Ursulo	First year intern in season 2.	Since episode 80
Giovanna Romo	Beatriz "Bea" Yañez	First year intern in season 2.	Since episode 80
Estefania Godoy	Sandra Galindo	Nurse. Mauricio's accomplice.	Season 1 only.
Alejandra Lazcano	Alondra	Psychiatrist. Ricardo's therapist.	Recurring special appearance in episode 88, regular since episode 89
Angélica Aragón	Elena Carrera; Ellis Grey	Ma. Alejandra's mother. A great and famous surgeon before she suffers from alzheimer. Dies of overdose by Dr. Mauricio.	Recurring until episode 79, special appearance in episode 87

=== Supporting cast ===
==== Season 1 ====
===== Special guest star =====
Cast	Character Original character in Grey's Anatomy	Description	Status
Rodrigo Cachero	Marcos	A doctor, Ma. Alejandra's ex-fiancée	First few episodes
Gustavo Navarro	Mateo		Single special appearance (Episode 30)
Juan Manuel Bernal	Santiago Sánchez	Patient	Recurring special appearance in season 1, returns in season 2 (Episode 105)
Guillermo Iván Dueñas	Daniel Duarte; Denny Duquette	Heart patient. Falls in love with Isabel and became her fiancée. Dies.	Recurring special appearance in season 1
Maria Jose Rosado	Rosa Maria; Rebecca Pope	Has amnesia.	Recurring special appearance in season 1
Jonathan Islas	Mateo	Clerk in the hospital. Paralyzed from waist down. Admires Andres.	Single special appearance (Episode 60)
Andrea Montenegro	Dra. Carreño	Andres' friend	Recurring special appearance in season 1

===== Recurring cast =====
Actor	Character	Description
Alfredo Anhert	Ted; Joe the bartender	Bar tender
Helga Diaz	Dr. Silvia	
Juliana Gomez	Graciela	Nurse
Paula Barreto		Augusto's wife
Ana Maria Kamper	Adela; Adele Webber	Ricardo's wife
Maria Margarita Giraldo		Javier's mother
Bianca Aragon		Javier's ex-wife
Valeria Chagüi	Catalina	Javier's daughter
Jaime Perez		Javier's son
Jairo Guerrero		German's nephew
Guillermo Villa		Attorney
Margarita Duran		
Ricardo Saldariagga		

===== Supporting cast =====
- Hermes Camelo
- Estefany Escobar
- Alfredo Barrero - Gomez
- Harold Fonseca
- Claudia Rocio Mora
- Martha Silva
- Andres Felipe Moreno - Armando
- Lisbet Cepeda
- Mauricio Sarmento
- Nini Pabon
- Walter Moreno
- Luz Estrada
- Liz Barbosa
- Angela Duarte
- Rodrigo Marulanda
- Shirley Marulanda
- Lucho Velasco
- Sebastian Ospina
- Mabel Bohorquez
- Rosmery Cardenas
- Camila Bruges
- Emma Carolina Cruz
- Isabella Grimaldo
- Molly Quevedo
- Andres Bermudez
- Juliana Galviz
- Jacky Aristizabal
- Mario Calderon
- Valentina Carrasco
- Johnny Forero
- Rodolfo Ordonez
- Giovanny Guzman
- Ricardo Riveros
- Karem Escobar
- julio Pachon
- Angelo valotta
- Manuel Busquets
- Maria Eugenia Penagos
- Julian Beltran
- Alberto Cadeno
- Francisco Perez
- Shirley Martinez
- Edward Zuniga
- Nicolas Gomez
- Carlos penagos
- Anderson Otalvaro
- Yeimily Medrano
- maria Isabel Bernal
- Johan Mendez
- Rodolfo Silva
- Juan David Galindo
- Wilkins Rodriguez
- Cristina Ruiz
- Linda Patino
- Piero Gomez
- Diego Camacho
- Gerardo Calero
- Bernardo Garcia
- Alieta Montero
- Jonathan Santamaria
- Andrea Naranjo
- Bernardo Garcia
- Alieta Montero
- Claudia Cadavid
- Lorena Tovar

==== Season 2 ====
===== Special guest star =====
Cast	Character	Description	Episodes (Status)
Mauricio Islas		Adela's lover	Episode 60
Claudia Lobo			
Ariel López Padilla	Jaime Rivero	Actor. A patient.	Recurring special appearance in season 2, Episode 88 to 103
Miguel Ángel Ferriz	Mr. Torres	Claudia's father, Jorge's father-in-law, Diego's grandfather	
Paloma Woolrich	Elena	Manolo's mother	episodes 97–107
Victor Huggo Martín	Manolo	Elena's schizophrenic son	Episodes 97–107
José Alonso	Don Gualberto	Eighty-year-old patient	Episode 100 - 113
Patricia Bernal	Mariana	Gualberto's girlfriend	Special guest star 103 - 113
Cynthia Rodríguez	Dévora		
Michel Brown	Tomas Ballesteros	Joel's father, a candidate	Episode 104
Sergio de Bustamante	Silvestre Ramirez	Andres' biology teacher in secondary school.	Episode 107 - 115
Juan Alfonso Baptista	Hugo	Lorena's husband	Episode 115
Ofelia Medina	Irene	Santiago's mother	Episode 116
Edith González	Andrea Carranti	Lorena's mother, Javier's teenage girlfriend	Episode 125
Ari Telch	Tejeda	Luz's father	Episode 127
Anna Ciochetti		Joshue's mother	Episode 135

===== Supporting cast =====
Cast	Character	Description	Status (Episodes)
Keyla Wood		Patient	Episode 82
Edgar Wotto			
José Sefami	Atilio Manrique	Aura's driver	
Arianna Ron	Magda Maza	Augusto's sister	
Luis Yeverino		Bridegroom	
Denisse Marion		Bride	
Paulette Airline Hernández	Clara		
Rocío Verdejo	Dra. Daniela Cevallo		Recurring since season 2
Alejandra Urdain			
Enrique Ramirez	Toño		
Joanydka Mariel	Toño's mother		
Daniel Martínez	David Valencia	Carmela's alcoholic stepfather	
José Eduardo	Edgar Valencia	Carmela's half-brother	
Héctor Parra	Alberto	Gualberto's son	
Roxana Saucedo		Gualberto's daughter	
Roberta Burns	Lorena Contreras	Javier's daughter	Recurring special guest star
Adrián Herrera	Joel Ballesteros	Tomas' son	
Fidel Garriga		Eliseo's father	
Dora Montero		Eliseo's mother	
Emilio Guerrero		Corrupted lawyer. Killed Augusto.	(Villain)
Eduardo Arroyuelo		Alondra's husband	
Kenia Gazcón		Clara's mother	
Citlali Galindo		Gynecologist	115
Fabian Peña		Surgeon	116
Amara Villafuerte		Paulina's mother	116
Mauricio Bonet	Sergio	Paulina's father	116
Alejandra Urdain			
Carmen Delgado		Eduardo's mother	117
Iván Bronstein		Sergio's assistant	
Mayte Gil	Paulina		115
Jessica Roteache		Nacho's mother	117
Armando Durand			
Jesús Vargas			
Ricardo Esquerra			
Alejandro Barrios			
Karla Rico			
Homero Wimer	Singer		Ep. 123
Vanessa Acosta			Special guest star
Alberto Casanova	Julian Becerra		Special guest star
Pilar Fernández			
Carlos Torres			
Mónica Dionne			
Fernando Banda			
Cristina Salas			
Rafael Cortes			
Ramiro Huerta		Tejeda's friend and lawyer	
Pilar Hernandez	Rosalba		
Tatiana del Real			131
Cristobal Orellana			131
Arturo Valdemar			131
Carlos Fonseca			131
Luis Carlos Muñoz			131
Cristal Uribe			132
Enrique Muñoz			132
Xavier Massimi			132
Patricia Madrid			133
Ernesto Alvarez			133
Juan Pablo Medina			135
Barbara de Regil			135

====== Upcoming guest stars ======
- Cristóbal Orellana
- Luis Carlos
- Cristian Iker Rosas

== Casting ==
The role of Maria Alejandra was actually given to Edith González, but was replaced by Adriana Louvier, and eventually Iliana Fox. Later, Gonzalez stars in Cielo rojo, and Louvier in Emperatriz. Most cast and crews have worked together in other telenovelas produced by Azteca such as Cuando seas mía (Fernando Gaitan, Elisa Salinas, Juan David Burns, Sergio Basanez, Iliana Fox, Rodrigo Abed, Rodrigo Cachero, and Alejandro Lukini) and La duda (Jose Carlos Rodriguez, Fabiana Perzabal). Venezuelan actress Johanna Morales is promoted from recurring role to starring role in Episode 74.

The second season is filmed in Mexico. Since Venezuelan actress Johanna Morales could not continue to stay in Mexico, therefore her character is killed off.
