= Cielo sin estrellas =

Mexican telenovela

- Genre: Telenovela; Drama
- Starring: Germán Robles
- Country of origin: Mexico
- Original language: Spanish

Original release
- Network: Telesistema Mexicano
- Release: 1961 – 1961

Related
- La brújula rota; Conflicto

Cielo sin estrellas is a Mexican telenovela produced by Telesistema Mexicano.

== Cast ==
- Germán Robles
