= Héctor Bonilla =

Mexican actor (1939–2022)

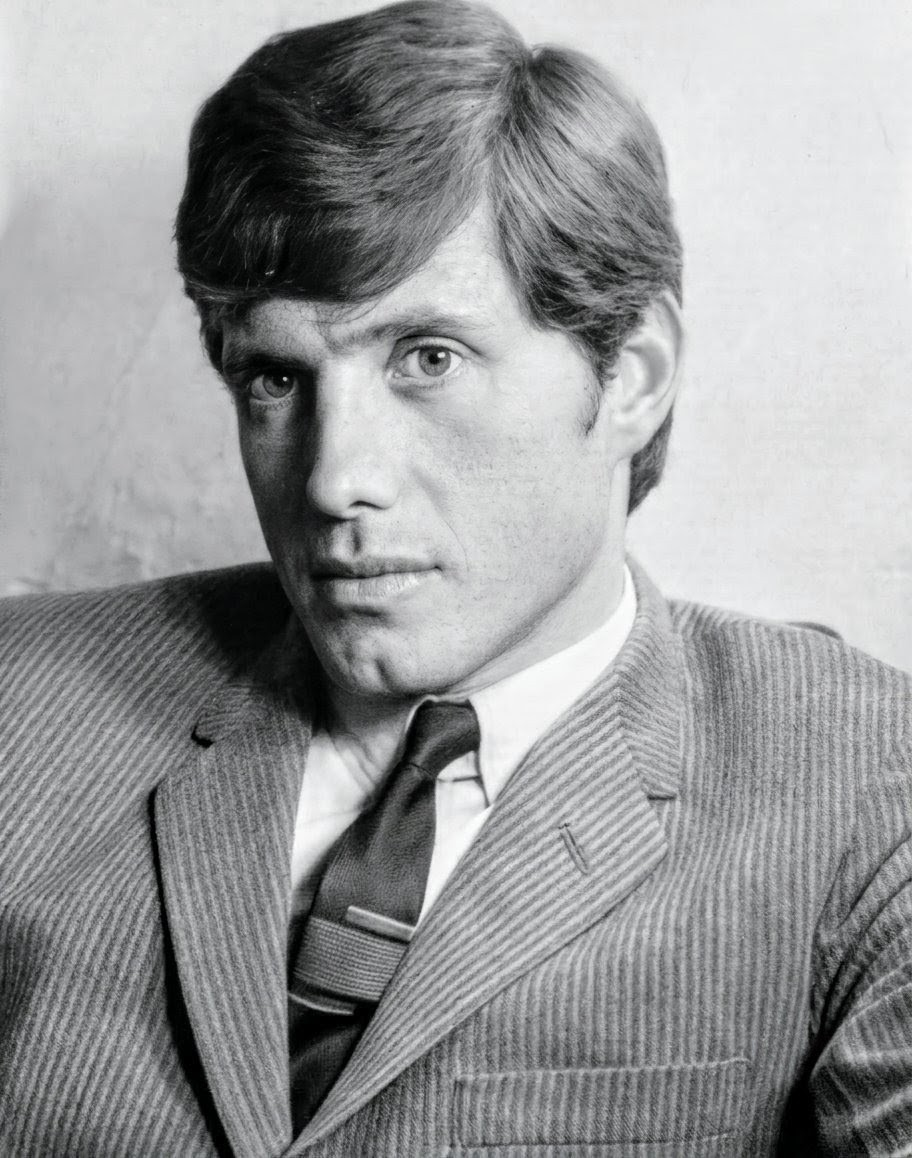
- Bonilla in the 1970s
- Born: Héctor Hermilo Bonilla Rebentun; 14 March 1939; Tetela, Puebla, Mexico
- Died: 25 November 2022 (aged 83); Mexico City, Mexico
- Occupation: Actor
- Children: Fernando Bonilla

Héctor Hermilo Bonilla Rebentun (14 March 1939 – 25 November 2022) was a Mexican actor and director known for his movies Meridiano 100 and Rojo Amanecer.

Bonilla died on 25 November 2022, at the age of 83.

== Filmography ==
=== Film ===
Year	Title	Role	Notes
1974	Meridiano 100		Ariel Award for Best Actor
1977	Mina, Wind of Freedom		
1977	Matinée		Nominated — Ariel Award for Best Actor
1978	Bloody Marlene		Nominated — Ariel Award for Best Actor
1989	Rojo Amanecer		Ariel Award for Best Actor
1995	Doble Indemnización		Nominated — Ariel Award for Best Supporting Actor
1996	Luces en la Noche		Nominated — Ariel Award for Best Actor
2007	Ratatouille	Django	Latin American Spanish dub
2015	Una última y nos vamos	Picho	
2016	7:19	Martin Soriano	
2016	The Jungle Book (2016 film)	Baloo	Latin American Spanish dub
2017	Coco (2017 film)	Oscar and Felipe Rivera	Latin American Spanish dub

=== Television ===
Title	Year	Role	Notes
La casa de las fieras	1967	Ramíro	
Juventud divino tesoro	1968		
La Gata	1970	Paris	
Velo de novia	1971		
Los miserables	1973		
Extraño en su pueblo	1973		
Cartas sin destino	1973		
Canción de Navidad	1974	Fred, sobrino de Scrooge	
Paloma	1975	Alejandro	
Lo imperdonable	1975	Ernesto	
Pacto de amor	1977	Guillermo	
Viviana	1978	Jorge Armando Moncada	
El Chavo del Ocho	1979	as Himself	Episode: Hector Bonilla visits El Chavo Neighborhood
Soledad	1980	Jesús Sánchez Fuentes	
Vanessa	1982	Luciano de Saint-Germain	
La pasión de Isabela	1984	Adolfo Castanedo	
La gloria y el infierno	1986	Miguel Vallarta	
Rosa salvaje	1987	Braulio Covarrubias	
La casa al final de la calle	1989	César	
Atrapada	1991	Gonzalo Rodríguez	
Señora	1998	Omar Cervantes	
La vida en el espejo	1999	Julio Escandón	
El tío Alberto	2000	Tío Alberto	
Amores, querer con alevosía	2001	Padre Corona	
Lo que callamos las mujeres	2001	Javier	Episode: "La Lola enamorada"
Tal para cual	2002		
Agua y aceite	2002	Gerardo	
Mirada de mujer, el regreso	2003	Jerónimo	
Monica y el profesor	2003		
Belinda	2004	Roberto Arismendi	
Machos	2005	Ángel Mercader	
Campeones de la vida	2006	Ciro Duarte	
El juramento	2008	Teodoro Robles Conde	
Mujer comprada	2009	Abelardo Díaz	
Entre el amor y el deseo	2010	Alfredo Fontana	
Amor cautivo	2012	Félix del Valle	
Secretos de familia	2013	Manuel	
Amor sin reserva	2014	Uriel Olivaterra	
El César	2017	TBA	
El Señor de los Cielos	2018	El Rayo	
