= Cuatro en la trampa =

Mexican telenovela

- Genre: Telenovela; Drama
- Starring: Adriana Roel; Ignacio López Tarso; Fernando Luján
- Country of origin: Mexico
- Original language: Spanish

Original release
- Network: Telesistema Mexicano
- Release: 1961 – 1961

Related
- Conflicto; Culpas ajenas

Cuatro en la trampa (English title: Four in the trap) is a Mexican telenovela produced by Televisa and transmitted by Telesistema Mexicano.

Adriana Roel and Ignacio López Tarso starred as protagonists, Fernando Luján starred as main antagonist.

== Cast ==
- Adriana Roel
- Ignacio López Tarso
- Fernando Luján
- Armando Silvestre
- Andrea López
- Rubén Rojo
