= Martha Mariana Castro =

Mexican actress

Martha Mariana Castro (born November 7, 1966) is a Mexican actress. She was married to actor Fernando Luján, with whom she has a son, Franco Paolo Ciangherotti.

== Early life ==
Born in Cuautla, Morelos, she grew up in the city of Puebla and earned a degree in Philosophy and Literature from the Universidad de Puebla.

She began her acting career as a child in plays. As of 2005, she is the protagonist of Los Sánchez, a telenovela on TV Azteca based on the Argentine production Los Roldán. In this production she plays the role of Yoli, a woman in love with her widower brother-in-law.

== Films ==
- Espinas (2005) as Rebeca
- Smee (short, 2004)

== Telenovelas ==
- Mujer comprada (2009) as Ofelia
- Vuélveme A Querer (2009) as Irene Robles
- Campeones de la vida (2007) as Alma
- Los Sánchez (2004) as Yolanda "Yoli" de Sánchez
- Mirada de mujer: El regreso (2003) as Daniela
- Tres veces Sofía (1998) as Laura de Márquez
- Mirada de mujer (1997) as Daniela
- La sonrisa del diablo (1996)
- El vuelo del águila (1996) as Justa Saavedra (Rafaela)
- La paloma (1995)
- Valentina (1993) as Mariela

== TV shows ==
- Y sin embargo... se mueve (1994)
