= Cara o cruz =

- Genre: Telenovela; Drama
- Written by: Eliseo Alberto; Luis Zelkowicz
- Directed by: Antonio Serrano; Jorge Ríos Villanueva
- Starring: Ana de la Reguera; José Ángel Llamas; José María Yaspik; Plutarco Haza
- Opening theme: "A Cara o Cruz" by Ricardo Arjona
- Country of origin: United States
- Original language: Spanish
- No. of episodes: 55

Production
- Executive producer: Carlos Resendi
- Producers: Carlos Payán; Epigmenio Ibarra
- Running time: 42-45 minutes

Original release
- Network: Telemundo
- Release: May 21 – August 3, 2001

Cara o cruz, is an American telenovela created and produced by Telemundo and Argos Comunicación in 2001.

== Cast ==
- José Ángel Llamas - Ismael Serrano
- Ana de la Reguera - Mariana Medina / Aída
- José María Yaspik - Armando Pescador
- Plutarco Haza - Martín Alcántara
- Fabián Corres - Aurelio Salazar
- Patricia Pereyra - Teresa Alcántara
- Itari Martha - Lourdes Alcántara
- Julieta Egurrola - Matilde Sosa de Alcántara
- Enrique Singer - Leonardo Medina
- Juan Pablo Abitia - Eduardo Medina
- Gabriela Roel - Claudette
- Jorge Lavat - Melchor Hidalgo
- Patricio Castillo - Fidelio
- Luisa Huertas - Julia
- Alpha Acosta - Cony
- Isabel Herrera - Noemi
- Octavio Castro - Yeyo
- Roger Nevares - Dr. Efrain Guzmán
- Fabián Peña - Lic. Emilio Carranza
- Verónica Toussaint - Alejandra
- Joaquín Cosío
- Alberta Guerra
- Martha Higareda - Rosario
- Dora Montera
- Sandra Quiroz
- Javier Ríos
- Fernando Sarfatti
- Georgina Tabera
