= Conflicto =

- Genre: Telenovela; Drama
- Created by: Marissa Garrido
- Country of origin: Mexico
- Original language: Spanish

Production
- Running time: 30 minutes

Original release
- Network: Telesistema Mexicano
- Release: 1961 – 1961

Related
- Cielo sin estrellas; Cuatro en la trampa

Conflicto is a Mexican telenovela produced by Televisa and transmitted by Telesistema Mexicano.

== Cast ==
- Carmen Molina
- Alejandro Ciangherotti
- Nicolás Rodríguez
- Freddy Fernández "El Pichi"
- Jacqueline Andere
