= Xavier Massimi =

Mexican actor

- Born: October 7, 1981 (age 44); Mexico City, Distrito Federal

Xavier Massimi (born October 7, 1981) is a Mexican actor. He first acting role was as Bruno in the film La primera noche.

== Filmography ==
- A Corazón Abierto (Mexico) (2012)
- Machos (2005) TV Series .... Adolfo Mercader
- La Heredera (2004) TV Series ....
- 7 mujeres, 1 homosexual y Carlos (2004) .... Miguel
- Mirada de mujer: El regreso (2003) TV Series .... Santiago
- Por tí (2002) TV Series .... Omar
- Agua y aceite (2002) TV Series .... Francisco
- Azul tequila (1998) TV Series .... Fabián Vidal
- La primera noche (1998) .... Bruno
