= Mirada de mujer, el regreso =

Mexican telenovela

- Genre: Telenovela; Romantic drama
- Created by: Araceli Monsell
- Written by: Luis Felipe Ybarra
- Directed by: Raúl Quintanilla Matiella; Jorge Ríos Villanueva
- Starring: Angélica Aragón; Ari Telch
- Music by: Gilberto Santa Rosa
- Opening theme: "Mentira" (Gilberto Santa Rosa)
- Country of origin: Mexico
- Original language: Spanish
- No. of episodes: 245

Production
- Executive producers: Myrna Ojeda; Pedro Lira
- Producer: Elisa Salinas
- Cinematography: Jorge Rios Villanueva

Original release
- Network: Azteca Uno
- Release: 9 June 2003 – 14 May 2004

Mirada de mujer: El regreso (English: The Gaze of a Woman: The Return) is a Mexican telenovela, which was produced by and broadcast on Azteca Uno in 2003. It is the sequel of Mirada de Mujer (1997).

== Theme song ==
The theme song of the telenovela is "Mentira" (in English "It's a lie") and it is performed by Gilberto Santa Rosa.

== Cast ==
=== Main cast ===
- Angélica Aragón as María Inés Domínguez de San Millán
- Ari Telch as Alejandro Salas

=== Supporting cast ===
- Héctor Bonilla as Jerónimo
- Fernando Luján as Lic. Ignacio San Millán
- Evangelina Elizondo as Doña Emilia Elena viuda de Domínguez 'Mamá Elena'
- Verónica Langer as Rosario
- María Renée Prudencio as Adriana San Millán
- Bárbara Mori as Mónica San Millán
- Plutarco Haza as Andrés San Millán
- Álvaro Carcaño Jr as Nicolás
- Olmo Araiza as Alex Salas
- Patricia Llaca as Verónica Segovia
- Mónica Dionne as Paloma Santiago
- René Gatica as Francisco
- Iliana Fox as Ana Camila
- Anna Ciocchetti as Sara Cárdenas
- Hector Arredondo as Julián
- Mauricio Ochmann as José Chacón
- Ana Serradilla as Carolina
- Martha Mariana Castro as Daniela
- Rodrigo Abed as Rodrigo
- Xavier Massimi as Santiago
