= Under the Salt =

2008 film

- Theatrical release poster
- Spanish: Bajo la sal
- Directed by: Mario Muñoz
- Starring: Humberto Zurita; Plutarco Haza
- Cinematography: Serguei Saldívar Tanaka
- Edited by: Jorge García
- Music by: Federico Bonasso
- Distributed by: Warner Bros. Pictures
- Release date: 17 October 2008; (Mexico)
- Country: Mexico
- Language: Spanish

Under the Salt is a 2008 Mexican thriller film directed by Mario Muñoz. The film's music was composed by Federico Bonasso.

== Cast ==
- Humberto Zurita
- Plutarco Haza
- Ricardo Polanco
- Moises Arizmendi
- Emilio Guerrero
- Blanca Guerra
