= High Heat (TV series) =

Mexican television series

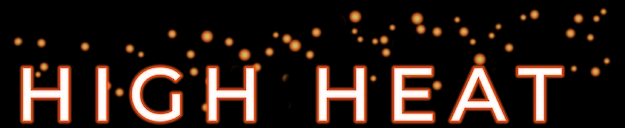
- Spanish: Donde hubo fuego
- Genre: Drama; Melodrama
- Created by: José Ignacio Valenzuela
- Country of origin: Mexico
- Original language: Spanish
- No. of seasons: 1
- No. of episodes: 39

Production
- Running time: 30–45 minutes
- Production company: Argos Producciones

Original release
- Network: Netflix
- Release: August 17, 2022

High Heat (Spanish: Donde hubo fuego) is a Mexican drama streaming television series created by José Ignacio Valenzuela, previously responsible for the series Who Killed Sara? The series premiered worldwide on Netflix on August 17, 2022.

== Plot ==
Poncho, who wants to investigate his brother's murder more thoroughly, sets out to find the culprit and seek justice. His trail leads to a fire station in a Mexico City neighborhood. He infiltrates the fire station undercover and begins his investigation while going about his daily work as a firefighter, with all the risks. One of his colleagues is Olivia, the only female firefighter at the station, who joins him in his search for the truth after finding out Poncho's true intentions. At the same time, the prison sentence of Ricardo Urzúa, accused of murdering several women, is coming to an end. His rehabilitation begins, and he does everything he can to become head of the guard, and is also looking for answers, as well as for his child, who knows nothing about him.

== Cast ==
- Eduardo Capetillo as Ricardo Urzúa Lozano
  - Eduardo Capetillo Gaytán as young Ricardo Urzúa Lozano
- Itatí Cantoral as Gloria “Glorita” Carmona
- Esmeralda Pimentel as Olivia Serrano
- Iván Amozurrutia as Alfonso “Poncho” Quiroga / Alfonso Urzúa Luján / Alfonso Carrasco
- Oka Giner as Leonora Robledo
- Plutarco Haza as Hugo González Cortez / Noé Serrano Diccarey
  - Manuel Alcaraz as young Hugo González Cortez
- Mauricio Hénao as Daniel “Dani” Quiroga / Daniel Urzúa Luján
- Polo Morín as Julián
- Antonio Sotillo as Alejandro Molina
- Daniel Gama Moreno as Gerardo “Gera”
- Ana Jimena Villanueva as Ana Linares
- Humberto Busto as Ángel Linares
- Nahuel Escobar as Fabio
- Rebeca Herrera as Rosario Sarmiento
- Mónica Guzmán as Penélope “Lopita”
- Giovanna Reynaud as Mayte
- José Manuel Rincón as Erick
- Everardo Arzate as Esteban
- Javier Díaz Dueñas as Elías Solórzano
- Adrián Aguirre as Espinoza
- Tamara Mazarraza as Gaby

== Episodes ==
No. overall	No. in season	Title	Directed by	Written by	Original release date
1	1	"Dreaming of Fire" "Soñar con fuego"	Unknown	Unknown	August 17, 2022
2	2	"Death Does Not Forgive" "La muerte no perdona"	Unknown	Unknown	August 17, 2022
3	3	"He's Just My Boss" "Es solo mi jefe"	Unknown	Unknown	August 17, 2022
4	4	"McAllen" "McAllen"	Unknown	Unknown	August 17, 2022
5	5	"Do You Know What You're Getting Yourself Into?" "¿Sabes dónde te estás metiendo?"	Unknown	Unknown	August 17, 2022
6	6	"The First Night Is the Hardest" "La primera noche es más difícil"	Unknown	Unknown	August 17, 2022
7	7	"The Dead Can Speak" "Los muertos pueden hablar"	Unknown	Unknown	August 17, 2022
8	8	"Family History" "Historia familiar"	Unknown	Unknown	August 17, 2022
9	9	"Information Is Power" "Información es poder"	Unknown	Unknown	August 17, 2022
10	10	"Question It and Find Out" "Desconfía y acertarás"	Unknown	Unknown	August 17, 2022
11	11	"The Past Haunts Me" "El pasado me persigue"	Unknown	Unknown	August 17, 2022
12	12	"A Father Doesn't Make Mistakes" "Un padre no se equivoca"	Unknown	Unknown	August 17, 2022
13	13	"A Little Distance" "Un poco de distancia"	Unknown	Unknown	August 17, 2022
14	14	"Rotten Apple" "Manzana prohibida"	Unknown	Unknown	August 17, 2022
15	15	"I Don't Believe in Coincidences" "No creo en coincidencias"	Unknown	Unknown	August 17, 2022
16	16	"Underground Secret" "Secreto bajo tierra"	Unknown	Unknown	August 17, 2022
17	17	"Surprise" "Sorpresa"	Unknown	Unknown	August 17, 2022
18	18	"The Sketch" "Retrato hablado"	Unknown	Unknown	August 17, 2022
19	19	"Not Who They Think" "No es la persona que todos creen"	Unknown	Unknown	August 17, 2022
20	20	"Past Present" "Pasado presente"	Unknown	Unknown	August 17, 2022
21	21	"Shock to the Heart" "Golpe al corazón"	Unknown	Unknown	August 17, 2022
22	22	"Losing Everything" "Perderlo todo"	Unknown	Unknown	August 17, 2022
23	23	"If I Can't Have Them, No One Will" "Si no son míos, no serán de nadie"	Unknown	Unknown	August 17, 2022
24	24	"A Fatherless Child" "Un hijo sin padre"	Unknown	Unknown	August 17, 2022
25	25	"An Unforgettable Evening" "Una noche inolvidable"	Unknown	Unknown	August 17, 2022
26	26	"Love Is Never Too Much" "El amor nunca es demasiado"	Unknown	Unknown	August 17, 2022
27	27	"There Are No Coincidences" "Las coincidencias no existen"	Unknown	Unknown	August 17, 2022
28	28	"Father and Son" "Padre e hijo"	Unknown	Unknown	August 17, 2022
29	29	"Underground" "Bajo tierra"	Unknown	Unknown	August 17, 2022
30	30	"Broken Hearts" "Corazones rotos"	Unknown	Unknown	August 17, 2022
31	31	"The Reasons Why" "La razón de los motivos"	Unknown	Unknown	August 17, 2022
32	32	"Waking Among the Dead" "Resucitar de entre los muertos"	Unknown	Unknown	August 17, 2022
33	33	"Winners and Losers" "Ganadores y perdedores"	Unknown	Unknown	August 17, 2022
34	34	"A Bad Father" "Un padre extraño"	Unknown	Unknown	August 17, 2022
35	35	"Road Trip" "Road trip"	Unknown	Unknown	August 17, 2022
36	36	"You Don't Need Anyone Else" "No necesitas a nadie más"	Unknown	Unknown	August 17, 2022
37	37	"You Don't Know How to Be Alone" "No sabes estar solo"	Unknown	Unknown	August 17, 2022
38	38	"I Will Always Be Someone Else" "Siempre voy a ser otro"	Unknown	Unknown	August 17, 2022
39	39	"The Time Has Come" "Llegó la hora"	Unknown	Unknown	August 17, 2022
