= Argos Media Group =

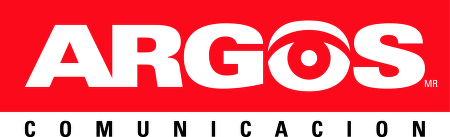
- Formation: 1992; 34 years ago
- Founders: Carlos Payán, Epigmenio Ibarra and Hernán Vera
- Type: cinema producer
- Location(s): 200 Mexico Avenue; Mexico City, Federal District, Mexico
- Owners: Carlos Payán, Epigmenio Ibarra and Verónica Velasco
- Website: www.argoscomunicacion.com

Argos Media Group is a television and film production company owned by Epigmenio Ibarra based in Mexico City.

== History ==
The company started as the telenovela-production unit for TV Azteca, producing many telenovelas for this network, including Nada personal and Mirada de mujer. It also co-produced Sexo, pudor y lágrimas in 1999 directed by Antonio Serrano who has directed five telenovelas and another film (Lucía, Lucía) with Argos. In October 2000, Argos signed a contract with Telemundo to produce telenovelas for this network. The deal ended in 2006 with the production of Marina. Argos also owns an acting school, CasAzul, a music unit, Argos Música, and a theater production unit, Argos Teatro. Most of the content produced by Argos is filmed in the majestic Estudios Churubusco that were used to produce all the films during the Mexican gold film era.

In 2007, Argos briefly re-signed with TV Azteca, producing Mientras haya vida, Vivir sin ti and Deseo prohibido. In 2010, Argos signed with Cadenatres to produce 480 hours of programming for the network. In 2012, Argos re-signed with Telemundo to produce two telenovelas per year. Argos has also produced television series for HBO Latin America and MTV Latin America. From 2019 to 2022, Argos produced five television series for Netflix, including Yankee and Donde hubo fuego.

In June 2023, TelevisaUnivision purchased Argos. The first production under the new ownership was Con esa misma mirada.

== Units ==
- Argos Comunicación, Argos Cine – Film
- Argos Música
- Argos Teatro
- CasAzul – Acting school

== Zoom TV ==
- Zoom.tv (www.zoom.tv)

It started out as a website with original content, a reality show with fixed cameras in a real house called Inquilino. Visitors to this website were able to go into a chat room and talk live to the renters living in the house. It also had an internet radio station where Osvaldo Benavides hosted a weekend show.

Zoom TV was the precursor of what Argos' dubbed as "la tercera mirada" (the third look), a new television station, that would compete directly with the giant Televisa and TV Azteca (whom they had just broke ties with). It was in January 2002 when this new TV station would emerge, but legal issues prevented Argos from tubing and this venture as well as the website disappeared.

The programming was to be color-coded based on the content it was showing. For example, red was to be for adults only, while yellow was for the whole family. CEO of Argos, Epigmenio Ibarra does not lose hope that some day, he will have an output in his homeland Mexico, but for now he will only work as a content generator.

== Film ==
- Cronica de Una Muerte Anunciada (2010)
- Fuera del cielo (2007)
- Lucía, Lucía (2003)
- Ladies' Night (2003)
- La habitación azul (2002)
- Vivir mata (2001)
- Nocturno chilango
- Sexo, pudor y lágrimas (1999)

== Television ==
No.	Title	Year	Executive producers	Network	Notes
1990s
01	Nada personal	1996	Maika Bernard	TV Azteca	
02	Mirada de mujer	1997	Marcela Mejía	TV Azteca	
03	Demasiado corazón	1997	Sachiko Uzeta	TV Azteca	
04	Tentaciones	1998	Ana Celia Urquidi	TV Azteca	
05	El amor de mi vida	1998	Mónica Skorlich	TV Azteca	
06	La vida en el espejo	1999	Marcela Mejía	TV Azteca	
2000s
07	Todo por amor	2000	Mónica Skorlich	TV Azteca	
08	Cara o cruz	2001	Carlos Resendi	Telemundo	
09	Daniela	2002	Patricia Benítez Laucín	Telemundo	
10	La virgen de Guadalupe	2002	Carlos Resendi	Telemundo	
11	Feliz Navidad Mamá	2002	Mónica Skorlich	Telemundo	
12	Ladrón de corazones	2003	Sachiko Uzeta	Telemundo	
13	El alma herida	2003	Marcela Mejía	Telemundo	
14	Gitanas	2004	Rafael Urióstegui; Iván Aranda	Telemundo	
15	Zapata: Amor en rebeldía	2004	Sachiko Uzeta	Telemundo	
16	Los plateados	2005	Marcela Mejía	Telemundo	
17	Corazón partido	2005	Daniel Camhi	Telemundo	
18	Marina	2006	Rafael Urióstegui; Mary Kathryn Kennedy	Telemundo	
19	Mientras haya vida	2007	Marcela Mejía	TV Azteca	
20	Vivir sin ti	2008	Daniel Camhi	TV Azteca	
21	Capadocia	2008	Andrés Tagliavini	HBO Latinoamérica	
22	Deseo prohibido	2008	Iván Aranda	TV Azteca	
2010s
23	Las Aparicio	2010	Daniel Camhi	Cadenatres	
24	El sexo débil	2011	Daniel Camhi	Cadenatres	
25	Bienvenida realidad	2011	Gabriela Valentán	Cadenatres	
26	El octavo mandamiento	2011	Carlos Resendi	Cadenatres	
27	Infames	2012	Daniel Camhi	Cadenatres	
28	Rosa diamante	2012	Marcela Mejía	Telemundo	
29	Último año	2012	Carlos Resendi	MTV Latinoamérica	
30	La Patrona	2013	Gabriela Valentán	Telemundo	
31	El Señor de los Cielos	2013	Marcela Mejía; Mónica Francesca Vizzi	Telemundo	Seasons 1–7 only
32	Fortuna	2013	Carlos Resendi	Cadenatres	
33	Niñas mal	2013	Diego Bonaparte	MTV Latinoamérica	Season 2 only
34	Las trampas del deseo	2013	Rocío Barajas	Cadenatres	
35	La impostora	2014	Daniel Camhi	Telemundo	
36	Dos Lunas	2014	Marcela Mejía	Cadenatres	
37	Camelia la Texana	2014	Diego Ramón Bravo	Telemundo	
38	Señora Acero	2014	Ana Graciela Ugalde; Mónica Francesca Vizzi; Araceli Sánchez Mariscal; Marcel Ferrer	Telemundo	
39	Los miserables	2014	Araceli Sánchez Mariscal	Telemundo	
40	Vuelve temprano	2015	Carlos Resendi	Imagen Televisión	
41	La Doña	2016	Gabriela Valentán	Telemundo	
42	El Chema	2016	Patricia Benítez Laucín; Mauricio Ochmann	Telemundo	
43	Ingobernable	2017	Ana Graciela Ugalde; Rocío Barajas	Netflix	
44	Enemigo íntimo	2018	Mónica Francesca Vizzi	Telemundo	
45	Falsa identidad	2018	Iván Aranda	Telemundo	
46	Yankee	2019	Patricia Benítez Laucin	Netflix	
47	Preso No. 1	2019	Marcel Ferrer	Telemundo	
48	El Club	2019	Ana Graciela Ugalde	Netflix	
2020s
49	Oscuro deseo	2020	Patricia Benítez Laucin	Netflix	
50	Buscando a Frida	2021	Mónica Francesca Vizzi	Telemundo	
51	Donde hubo fuego	2022	Epigmenio Ibarra; Marcela Mejía; José Ignacio Valenzuela; Mónica Vizzi	Netflix	
52	Madre de alquiler	2023	Marcela Mejía; Mónica Vizzi	Netflix	
53	Con esa misma mirada	2025	Patricia Benítez Laucin; Fides Velasco Ibarra	Vix	
54	El precio de la fama	2026	Iván Aranda	Vix	
55	Yo no creo en los hombres	2026	Abraham Mancilla; Héctor Sotelo Blancas	Vix	
