= Fernando Luján =

Mexican actor (1938–2019)

- Born: Fernando Ciangherotti Díaz; August 23, 1939; Bogotá, Colombia
- Died: January 11, 2019 (aged 79); Puerto Escondido, Oaxaca, Mexico
- Occupation: Actor
- Years active: 1952–2019
- Spouse: Martha Mariana Castro
- Children: 10

Fernando Ciangherotti Díaz (August 23, 1939 – January 11, 2019), better known by the stage name Fernando Luján, was a Mexican actor. He was a star of the silver screen in classic mexican films during the Golden Age of Mexican cinema.

His father, Alejandro Ciangherotti Erbelia; his mother, Mercedes Soler; brother Alejandro Ciangherotti Jr; wife Martha Mariana Castro; sons Fernando Ciangherotti and Fernando Canek; and daughters Cassandra Ciangherotti and Vanessa Ciangherotti were or are also actors.

== Family ==
Luján was born in Bogotá, Colombia, while his parents, both actors, were on tour presenting a play, but he never obtained Colombian nationality. He is the son of Argentine actor Alejandro Ciangherotti Erbelia and Mercedes Soler (Mercedes Diaz Pavia), the youngest of the famous Soler family. His late brother, Alejandro Ciangherotti, ex-wife, Adriana Parra, wife Martha Mariana Castro, children Fernando, Vanessa, Cassandra, Fernando Canek, Franco Paolo, granddaughter and son-in-law Vaita and Roberto Sosa, nephews Alejandro III, Alexis and Alan are also actors.

He has ten children: five daughters and five sons.

=== Una vuelta al corazón ===
In 2009, his wife and daughter, Martha Mariana and Vanessa, produced a trilogy of the family in celebrating the ninth anniversary of Lo que callamos las mujeres, starring his children, nephews and granddaughter, where Vanessa and Fernando Ciangherotti serve as the director.

== Acting career ==
He started his acting career as a child in the Cinema of Mexico credited as Fernando Ciangherotti, but changed his stage name to Fernando Luján a few years later. After appearing in more than eight films, mostly light comedies, he obtained a role in the telenovela Cuatro en la trampa at age twenty-three. The next eighteen years, he alternated his film career with television, culminating with the worldwide famous production Los ricos también lloran. The next twelve years, he did not participate in telenovelas and only starred in four films. He returned to television with Vida robada and Cadenas de amargura in 1991.

After participating in three other telenovelas for Televisa in the next five years, he signed a contract with TV Azteca to co-star with Angélica Aragón in the second telenovela of that new network titled Mirada de mujer. This telenovela was a success and would produce a sequel six years later. After Mirada de mujer, he obtained significant roles in film, especially as the star of the film-version of Gabriel García Márquez's book No One Writes to the Colonel in 1999 (El coronel no tiene quien le escriba). His performance in this film was qualified as "remarkable" by The New York Times. In 2005, he received the Ariel Award by the Mexican Academy of Film in honoring his career and contributions to film.

== Death ==
A long-time cigar smoker, Luján died on January 11, 2019, in Puerto Escondido at the age of 79.

== Awards ==
- Ariel Award in 2005
  - Diosa de plata ("Silver Goddess") to honor his career in the Cinema of Mexico
- Fernando Luján was remembered as a "movie legend" at the 92nd Academy Awards ceremony on February 9, 2020.

== Filmography ==
=== Film ===
- La cobarde (1953) as Julio, niño (uncredited)
- The Unfaithful (1953) as Luisito (uncredited)
- La segunda mujer (1953) as Rudy, niño
- Los que no deben nacer (1953)
- El mil amores (1954) as Ricardo Rodríguez
- La edad de la tentación (1959) as Eduardo
- La sombra en defensa de la juventud (1960)
- Dangers of Youth (1960) as Ricardo
- Vacaciones en Acapulco (1961) as Pepe
- Mañana serán hombres (1961) as Raúl, el muñeco
- Juventud rebelde (1961) as Denis
- Jóvenes y bellas (1961) as Raúl Paz
- El cielo y la tierra (1962) as Greñas
- Dile que la quiero (1963) as Greñas
- La sombra de los hijos (1963) (uncredited)
- Amor y sexo (1964) as Gallina, interno
- El pueblo fantasma (1965) as Rio Kid
- El gángster (1965) as Pedro
- Neutrón contra los asesinos del karate (1965) as Nephew
- Amor de adolescente (1965) as Raúl Linares
- Viento negro (1965) as Ingeniero Julio
- Joselito vagabundo (1966) as Fernando
- Tirando a gol (1966) as Pedro
- Que haremos con papá? (1966)
- Juventud sin ley (1966) as Jorge Ordorica
- Fiebre de juventud (1966) as Luis
- Lanza tus penas al viento (1966) as Gustavo
- Sólo para ti (1966) as Juan Negro
- Acapulco a go-go (1966) as Robert
- Los perversos a go go (1967) as Tony
- Un novio para dos hermanas (1967) as Fernando Martínez Dávila
- Novias impacientes (1967) as Luis Quintero
- Caballos de acero (1967)
- Báñame mi amor (1968)
- Un Latin lover en Acapulco (1968)
- Cuatro contra el crimen (1968) as Peter
- El Agente 00 Sexy (1968) as Ernesto Romero
- 5 de chocolate y 1 de fresa (1968) as Miguel Ernesto Suárez
- Amor y esas cosas (1969) (segment "Adulterio formal, Un")
- Tres amigos (1970)
- Confesiones de una adolescente (1970)
- El oficio más antiguo del mundo (1970) as Miguel
- Cuerpazo del delito (1970) as Enrique (segment "La seductora")
- La hermana Dinamita (1970) as Dr. Tello
- Un amante anda suelto (1970)
- Los corrompidos (1971)
- Juegos de alcoba (1971) as Beto (segment: Paz y amor)
- El medio pelo (1972) as Doctor Sergio López
- Buscando una sonrisa (1972)
- La gatita (1972) as Rubén
- Besos, besos... y mas besos (1973) (segment "Dos veces por semana")
- Pilotos de combate (1973)
- La carrera del millón (1974)
- El alegre divorciado (1976) as Carlos Pozuelo
- El miedo no anda en burro (1976) as Raúl
- El patrullero 777 (1977) as Hombre suicida
- En la trampa (1979) as Alejandro
- Estas ruinas que ves (1979) as Paco Aldebarán
- La guerra de los pasteles (1979)
- Ese loco, loco hospital (1986)
- Más buenas que el pan (1987)
- Día de muertos (1988) as Francisco de Jesús Talamantes
- Solicito marido para engañar (1988) (uncredited)
- El garañón 2 (1990)
- Dos cuates a todo dar (1990)
- El último suspiro (1996)
- Fuera de la ley (1998)
- El coronel no tiene quien le escriba (1999) as The colonel
- En el país de no pasa nada (2000) as Enrique Laguardia
- Primer y último amor (2002) as Fermín Azcue
- El tigre de Santa Julia (2002) as Nando
- Tú te lo pierdes (2004) as Torcuato
- Las llaves de la independencia (2005) as Demetrio
- El carnaval de Sodoma (2006) as Padre Cándido
- Cañitas. Presencia (2007) as Don Fernando
- The Wind of Fear (2007) as Doctor Vila
- Insignificant Things (2008) as Augusto Gabrieli
- Cinco días sin Nora (2008) as José Kurtz
- El libro de las aguas (2008) as Ángel 1975
- Euforia (2009) as Duque
- Viento en contra (2011) as Justino Samperio
- Red Lips (2011) as Don Luis
- Tercera Llamada (2013) as Fernando
- Cásese quien pueda (2014) as Papá Méndes
- Selección Canina (2015) as Bernardo Lapata (voice)
- Manual de principiantes para ser presidente (2016) as Octogenario
- Cuando los hijos regresan (2017) as Manuel
- Overboard (2018) as Papi
- El refugio de los insomnes (2018) as Hombre Lobo (final film role)

=== Telenovelas ===
- Cuatro en la trampa (1961)
- La culpa de los padres (1963)
- Marina Lavalle (1965)
- El edificio de enfrente (1972) as Camilo
- Los que ayudan a Dios (1973)
- María José (1978) as El Jaiba
- Bella y bestia (1979) as Alfred
- Los ricos también lloran (1979) as Diego
- Vida robada (1991-1992) as Don Ramón
- Cadenas de amargura (1991) as Padre Julio
- Sueño de amor (1993)
- La paloma (1995)
- Para toda la vida (1996) as Juan Angel
- Mirada de mujer (1997) as Lic. Ignacio San Millán
- Todo por amor (2000-2001) as Gonzalo Robles
- Lo que es el amor (2001-2002) as Emiliano Lomelí
- Mirada de mujer: El regreso (2003) as Lic. Ignacio San Millán
- Las Juanas (2004) as Calixto Matamoros
- Montecristo (2006) as Alberto Lombardo
- Entre el amor y el deseo (2010-2011) as Edgar Dumont
- Quererte así (2012) as Alfred "Fred" Roth
- Los Rey (2012) as Everardo Rey Martínez
- Así en el barrio como en el cielo (2015) as Marcelo Ferrara

=== Series ===
- Pinche Pancho (2012)
- Ingobernable (2017) as Tomás Urquiza
