= La Paloma (TV series) =

- Title card
- Genre: Telenovela
- Created by: Ximena Suárez; Alfonso Espinoza
- Written by: Martha Carrillo
- Story by: José Rendón; Ximena Suárez
- Directed by: Luis Vélez
- Creative director: Carlos Trejo
- Starring: Manuel Ojeda; Isaura Espinoza; Gerardo Hemmer; Yolanda Ventura; Maite Embil
- Music by: Jorge Avendaño
- Country of origin: Mexico
- Original language: Spanish
- No. of seasons: 1
- No. of episodes: 50

Production
- Executive producer: José Rendón
- Producer: Roberto Hernández Vázquez
- Production locations: Mexico City, Mexico
- Cinematography: Felipe López; Otoniel Ramírez
- Editor: Gabriela Múzquiz
- Running time: 60 minutes
- Production company: Televisa

Original release
- Network: Canal de las Estrellas
- Release: August 14 – October 20, 1995

La Paloma (English title: The Dove) is a Mexican telenovela produced by José Rendón for Televisa in 1995. Gerardo Hemmer and Maite Embil starred as protagonists. The telenovela was cancelled abruptly due to the death of its protagonist Gerardo Hemmer. It was supposed to go on after his death, however, after filming a couple more scenes, Televisa decided to just cancel the telenovela altogether. It is to date the only telenovela from Televisa to suddenly gone off air, leaving it unfinished at just 50 episodes.

== Plot ==
Ramiro López Yergo owns a funeral home, and controls his wife Teresa and three children with an iron fist. Although he appears to be of high moral character Ramiro has a lover, Lilia, and is a corrupt and greedy man.

== Cast ==
- Gerardo Hemmer as Rafael Estrada Fuentes
- Maite Embil as Emilia López-Yergo Montenegro
- Manuel Ojeda as Ramiro López-Yergo Aguilar
- Arsenio Campos as Luis Alarcón
- Yolanda Ventura as Lilia Rivero
- Arath de la Torre as Paco Rivero
- Joaquín Cordero as Gilberto Bernal
- Delia Casanova as Elsa
- Isaura Espinoza as Teresa Montenegro Tovar de López-Yergo
- José María Yazpik as Ángel
- Adriana Barraza as Mother Clara
- Carolina Valsaña as Marcela
- Martha Mariana Castro as Lorena
- Marina Marín as Lucía
- Antonio Miguel as Don Mario
- Hernán Mendoza as Leonardo
- Sergio Sánchez as Montaño
- Lupita Lara as Toña
- Óscar Flores as Neto
- Samuel Loo as Enrique
- Alejandra Morales as Alicia
- Dalilah Polanco as Armida
- Alisa Vélez as Pilar López Yergo
- Fidel Garriga as Pedro
- Lourdes Villarreal as Rosa
- Abraham Ramos
- Fernando Luján
- Israel Jaitovich
- Fabián Corres
- Cuca Dublán
- Raúl Askenazi
- Gabriel Galván
