= Mientras haya vida =

Mexican telenovela

- Created by: Guillermo Ríos
- Developed by: Laura Sosa, Leticia López, Guillermo Ríos
- Starring: Margarita Rosa de Francisco
- Theme music composer: Margarita Rosa de Francisco
- Opening theme: Ven a Morir
- Country of origin: Mexico
- Original language: Spanish
- No. of episodes: 188

Production
- Executive producer: Epigmenio Ibarra y Carlos Payán
- Running time: 60 minutes

Original release
- Network: TV Azteca
- Release: May 2, 2007 – January 18, 2008

Related
- Vivir Sin Ti

Mientras Haya Vida is a Mexican telenovela.

== Story ==
The story revolves around the culture shock between two disparate worlds: That of the rich and the powerful versus that of the ordinary, everyday folk (a world where opportunities are virtually non-existent). And in the middle of both worlds, the one thing that most people in both worlds desire, true love. The powerful that loses everything, except his dignity, and a woman that has almost everything, except money.

It is the story of Héctor Cervantes, the powerful owner of the most important construction and engineering group in Mexico, INMEX. Hector is a widower. A solitary man that can do just about anything at the snap of his fingers. He becomes a fortress after the suicide of his wife Graciela. Hector is a powerful man, but behind his empire there are many secrets that haunt him. And for someone so powerful, these secrets will come back to haunt him, as his closest allies are his worst enemies. His friends and family will turn on him leaving him broke and without knowing what happened, or why.

It is also the story of Maria Montero, an abandoned housewife and mother of three young daughters, Elisa, Georgina (Gina) and Emiliana. Maria lives alone with her three daughters in a multifamily condominium complex in Mexico City. She owns a small "fonda" and basically lives to survive. Elisa is an architecture student at the UNAM. Gina is the wild and rebellious middle child. Emiliana is the youngest of the three... she has been sick since she was very little due to a fever and needs constant medical attention.

The lives of Hector and Maria come together as Maria tries to save her small condominium from being destroyed by the biggest project being planned by INMEX at the location where the complex lies.

== Cast ==
- Margarita Rosa de Francisco - Maria Montero
- Saul Lisazo - Hector Cervantes
- Paola Núñez - Elisa Montero
- Andres Palacios - Sergio Juarez
- Romina Gaetani - Romina Saenz
- Tomy Dunster - Alejandro Cervantes
- Hector Arredondo - Gael Cervantes
- Carmen Beato - Elena
- Anna Ciocchetti - Marion
- Farnesio de Bernal - Lorenzo
- Carmen Madrid - Natalia
- Carlos Torres Torrija - Leonardo Montero
- Marimar Vega - Gina Montero
- Alicia Zapien - Emiliana Montero
- Eric Hayser - Daniel
- Alan Ciangherotti - Julio
- Carolina Cartagena - Chabela
- Mayra Sierra - Ofelia
- Ana Ofelia Murguia - Toto
- Fernando Ciangherotti - Gonzalo
- Ari Telch - Ignacio
