= Fernando Ciangherotti =

Mexican television soap opera actor

Fernando Ciangherotti Jr. (born September 6, 1959) is a Mexican television and soap opera actor.

He is the son of Fernando Luján.

== Awards ==
- TVyNovelas Award for Best Supporting Actor (1993)
