= Amores, querer con alevosía =

Mexican telenovela

- Genre: Telenovela
- Created by: Bernardo Romero; Jimena Romero
- Directed by: Luis Vélez
- Creative director: Carlos Trejo
- Starring: Bárbara Mori; Christian Meier
- Music by: Ernesto Anaya; Juana Vargas
- Opening theme: "Alevosía" by Luis Eduardo Aute
- Country of origin: Mexico
- Original language: Spanish
- No. of episodes: 115

Production
- Executive producer: Miguel Postolache
- Producers: Rossana Arau; Elisa Salinas; Luis Vélez
- Cinematography: Óscar Palacios; Sergio Treviño
- Editor: Sigfrido García
- Camera setup: Multi-camera
- Production company: TV Azteca

Original release
- Network: Azteca Trece
- Release: January 15 – June 22, 2001

Amores, querer con alevosía is a Mexican telenovela that originally aired on Azteca Trece from January 15, 2001 to June 22, 2001. The telenovela was created by Bernardo Romero Pereiro and Jimena Romero for the company TV Azteca. It stars by Bárbara Mori and Christian Meier.

== Plot ==
This is a love story in which there are different ways of feeling it. Carolina belongs to a middle-class family. She lives with her parents and her two sisters and she has a boyfriend named Mario. In college, he accidentally meets Pablo, a young man who appears in an affair with his girlfriend. Their encounter is not so kind and ends with a battle, but in spite of this, there is certainly a great attraction between them, which seems to be the love of the first glance. Guillermo, father of Pablo, has a problem with the magazines that publishes his publishing house, so they decide to make a contract with the young people and publish a magazine for them. Among them, he meets with Carolina, who during his return to see Pablo initiates a powerful war without realizing that in fact they are in love.

== Cast ==
=== Starring ===
- Bárbara Mori as Carolina Morales
- Christian Meier as Pablo Herreros

=== Also starring ===
- Juan Manuel Bernal as Mario Rodríguez
- Miguel Ángel Ferriz as Arturo Morales
- Paloma Woolrich as Belinda de Morales
- Fernando Becerril as Guillermo Herreros
- Patricia Bernal as Susana de Herreros
- Daniel Martínez as Iván
- Carmen Beato as Ángela
- Francisco de la O as Felipe Montero
- Carlos Torrestorija as Fernando
- Dino García as Ignacio Orozco
- Gabriela de la Garza as Carmela Villalonga
- Elizabeth Cervantes as Matilde Morales
- Irene Azuela as Rocío Morales
- Mariana Isla as Pilar Sánchez
- Carla Rodríguez as Consuelo
- Eduardo Victoria as Antonio Redondo
- León Michel as Julián
- Lariza Mendizábal as Beatriz Quintana
- Carmen Perkins as Mercedes Quintana
- Jorge Levy as Alberto Ruíz
- Jorge Galván as Ricardo
- Saby Kamalich as Cristina

=== Recurring ===
- Plutarco Haza as Salvador
- Héctor Bonilla as Padre Corona
- Jesús Ochoa as Miguel Ángel
