= Lo que callamos las mujeres =

Mexican anthology television series

- Created by: Elisa Salinas
- Country of origin: Mexico
- Original language: Spanish
- No. of seasons: 18

Production
- Executive producers: Antulio Jiménez Pons; José Acosta; Alejandra Hernández; José Rendón; Juan David Burns; Genoveva Martínez; Ma. Eva Hernández; Alicia Carbajal; Rafael Urióstegui; Ana Celia Urquidi
- Camera setup: Multi-camera
- Production company: Azteca Estudios

Original release
- Network: Azteca Uno
- Release: 3 September 2000 – present

Lo que callamos las mujeres (English: What We Women Keep Silent), is a Mexican anthology television series created by Elisa Salinas, which deals with the social problems of Mexican society. The show started airing on the Mexican television network Azteca 13 as a way to compete with Canal de las Estrellas' Mujer, casos de la vida real. It started airing on the network in 2000 and has run continuously since then. The series continues to be one of the most popular programs on said television station and is currently being broadcast with great acceptance. Some of the most important theater, film and television actors have paraded in its cast.

== Background ==
The show presents the individual dramatizations of stories sent in by actual women in Mexico, each episode revolves around a specific topic or issue which usually is resolved in the end. As the title leads, the show was created with the principal to present and make known the issues and problems that women in Mexican society 'Silence' (Hence the name: What We Women Silence), or in other words, make the issues that are not accepted in society known. Episodes have involved themes such as:

Jealousy, family violence, violence in general, suicide, homelessness, unwanted pregnancies, juvenile delinquency, narcotics, child pornography, pornography in general, AIDS, alcoholism, age disparities in sexual relationships, corruption, exploitation, unjust termination of employment, male infertility, PTSD, child abuse, child abductions, child prostitution, prostitution in general, incest, rape, murder, and immigration-related problems or issues.

At the end of each episode, a list of centres and help agencies is presented to help other women who are suffering with the same problem, along with an inspirational poem which pertains to the theme used in the day's episode which instructs the viewer to "Break Their Silence". "Breaking Our Silence" became the show's tagline as of 2005, in conjunction with the show's fifth anniversary advertising campaign in which the show's recurring actresses appeared during each commercial break saying "It's now been five years of breaking our silence, easier than you thought. No?"

== Controversy ==
As expected, after the show's premiere, Silvia Pinal, the host of Mujer, casos de la vida real, blasted the show, claiming that it was nothing but a complete copy of her program.

== Production ==
- Producers: Genoveva Martínez, Ma. Eva Hernández, Ademir González Cancino, Norma Ruiz Esparza
- Directors: Angélica Aragón, Alberto Cervantes, Carlos Guerra, Carlos Villegas, Emmanuel Duprez, Hildebrando Carballido, Néxtor Galván, Ricardo Ruiz
- Foundations Coordination: Adriana Hammeken
- Supevisora Literaria: Eugenia Bonfil
- Casting: Blanca Alicia Brera
- Post Production: Carlos Olivares, Sergio Ojeda

== Cast ==
- Martha Mariana Castro
- Nathalia Aragonese.
- Gabriela de la Garza
