= Corazón salvaje (novel) =

1957 novel by Caridad Bravo Adams

Wild Heart
- Author: Caridad Bravo Adams
- Original title: Corazón salvaje
- Language: Spanish
- Publication date: 1957

Corazón salvaje (locally [koɾaˈson salˈβaxe]; English: Wild Heart) was a novel written by prolific Mexican writer Caridad Bravo Adams and published in 1957 after it had been adapted to the screen the previous year.

The story takes place in Martinique, starting in the late 1800s and ending with the 1902 volcanic eruption of Mt. Pelee in St. Pierre. It describes the life in the Caribbean of a boy who grows up to be a pirate (while his half-brother goes to study in France), and the two sisters who fall in love with him.

== Plot summary ==
This novel, originally by Caridad Bravo Adams is set in the Caribbean, specifically in the French colonies. The Mexican adaptation is set in the Atlantic coast of Mexico. The following plot summary is based on the 1993 version by Televisa, and is described using in-universe tone.

Francisco Alcazar is a wealthy landowner, who owns sugar cane fields. Francisco is married to Sofia, a severe and uncompassionate woman, with whom he has a son named Andres. Before his marriage to Sofia, Francisco had an affair with a married woman who was physically abused by her husband. The woman became pregnant and died when the child was 3 years old. This love-child is, in fact, Francisco's true firstborn. When this woman became pregnant, her husband refused to recognize the boy as his son. He also did not allow Francisco to recognize the child as his own. Thus, the boy named "Juan", became known as "Juan del Diablo" (Juan of the Devil) because he had no last name. Juan's mother eventually died of the shame and from the physical abuse she had received from her husband. Juan was raised with no love or instruction, in poverty and neglect. In his early teens, Juan's stepfather dies. Francisco, hiding the fact that Juan is his son, decides to invite him to live at his estate with his family, on the pretext of being a playmate for Andrés. Sofia finds out the truth and tries to send Juan away, to which Francisco objects. Finally, Francisco has an accident while riding his horse before he could legally recognize Juan as his son. Francisco leaves a letter with his intentions addressed to his friend and lawyer Noel Mancera. Sofia seizes the letter and hides it. On his deathbed, Francisco sends for his son Andrés, and while not telling the truth, asks him to care for Juan as a brother. After his death, Sofía sends Juan away without saying anything to Andrés. Eventually, Sofia decides to send Andrés to boarding school in France.

Juan grows up among the sailors and pirates of the port-city, earning a shocking reputation for dirty business (contraband of liquor), ruthlessness, and harboring unbound loyalty from his men. Juan is also a womanizer, his heart is still untaken. He has learned the identity of his biological father because Noel Mancera has told him. Through the years, Mancera has given Juan some education, and even offered to give him his last name. However, Juan refuses the offer because he feels that a last name is unwarranted in his chosen occupation.

Meanwhile, Mónica and Aimée are two beautiful young countesses, daughters of the deceased Count of Altamira, a distant cousin of Sofia de Alcazar. The Altamira family are very respectable in high society, but they now find themselves in bankruptcy. The only asset of the two young countesses is their nobility and beauty, and the long promise of betrothal between Monica and Andrés. Unfortunately for Mónica, Andres has forgotten about their engagement. While visiting Mexico City, Andres meets Mónica's younger sister, Aimee, who is beautiful, flirty and selfish. She shows interest in Andrés because he has wealth, influence, and power. Andrés falls completely in love with Aimee, a fact he later shares with his mother Sofia when she comes to visit him.

When Sofia returns home, she informs Catalina de Altamira that Andres has broken the engagement with Monica because he is now intent on marrying Aimee. Catalina is mortified at the thought of Monica's heartbreak. With her family's financial ruin in mind, Catalina reluctantly agrees to an engagement between Aimee and Andres. When Monica discovers that Andres has broken their engagement in order to marry her sister, she is immediately heartbroken. Monica decides to enter a convent to become a nun. Monica denies her feelings for Andres and tells everyone that becoming a nun is her true calling.

Meanwhile, Aimee returns to her hometown with her mother. One day, while walking along the beach, she spies Juan taking a bath in his beach house. Aimee had never met Juan and is unaware of his past or his connection to the Alcazar family. She watches him from a distance, but Juan sees her. Over the next few days, Aimee returns several times to spy on Juan. He decides to confront her and catches her while she's hiding. Soon after, Juan and Aimee fall in love and become lovers.

Juan goes away on a business trip and Aimee promises to wait for his return and marry him. When Andres arrives in his hometown, Aimee ignores her promise to Juan and agrees to marry Andres. Juan returns from his business trip several weeks later. Juan discovers that Aimee is now married to his half-brother and decides to kidnap her so that she carries out her promise. Andres, who knows nothing about his kinship to Juan and the affair between him and his wife, decides to employ him as the steward of Campo Real, his country estate.

Meanwhile, Monica leaves the convent to spend some time in the countryside with her family. Monica quickly discovers the affair between Juan and Aimee. Monica confronts her sister, but Aimee refuses to end her affair with Juan. Since Monica decides to leave the convent, Andres attempts to redeem himself by proposing an engagement between Monica and his friend Alberto de la Serna. Meanwhile, Andres learns that Juan is actually his brother and that he had an unseemly affair with a young lady in his household. Andres immediately assumes that the lady in question is Monica. Because of this misunderstanding, Monica is pressured to get married immediately. Monica agrees to get married in an attempt to protect Andres and her sister from the impending scandal, but she refuses to marry Alberto. Instead, Monica decides to marry Juan because she believes this is the only way to prevent Aimee to continue her affair with him. In an unexpected turn of events, Juan accepts to marry Monica.

Aimee is filled with jealousy and rage at the thought of Juan being married to her sister. Aimee spends all her time plotting and scheming to destroy Monica's engagement to Juan. Unfortunately for Aimee, Juan is no longer interested in her. He is now captivated by Monica's beauty and her kind demeanor. At the same time, Monica discovers a whole different side to Juan's personality. Monica learns that despite Juan's rough exterior, he can also be kind, gentle, and noble. Against all odds, Monica and Juan slowly begin to fall in love. Their happiness is short lived when Andres finds out about Juan's affair with Aimee.

== Cast ==
- Eduardo Palomo .... Juan del Diablo / Juan de Alcazar y Valle - Main protagonist/ Francisco de Alcazar y Valle - father of Andres in the first episode
- Edith González.... Countess Monica (Regina) de Altamira de Alcazar y Valle - Main protagonist
- Ana Colchero.... Countess Aimeé de Altamira de Alcazar y Valle - Main antagonistic protagonist, sister of Monica (Regina) Villain
- Ariel López Padilla .... Andrés de Alcazar y Valle - husband of Aimeé and half-brother of Juan, Villain
- Enrique Lizalde .... Noel Mancera - friend and mentor of Juan
- Claudia Islas .... Sofía de Alcazar y Valle - mother of Andres, Villain
- Arsenio Campos .... Alberto de la Serna - friend of Andres, villain
- Luz María Aguilar .... Countess Catalina de Altamira - mother of Monica (Regina) and Aimeé
- Ernesto Yáñez .... Bautista Rosales - foreman of Campo Real, villain
- Yolanda Ventura .... Azucena - protegee of Juan
- Javier Ruán .... Guadalupe Cajiga - owner of brothel, villain
- César Évora .... Marcelo - new judge at San Pedro
- Isaura Espinoza .... Amanda - sister-in-law of Marcelo
- Verónica Merchant .... Mariana - daughter of Amanda and Noel Mancera
- Olivia Cairo .... Juanita - maid
- Emilio Cortés .... Serafin - boy, friend of Juan
- Ana Laura Espinosa .... Lupe - maid
- Gerardo Hemmer .... Joaquín - hired to spy on Juan later becomes his friend
- Jaime Lozano .... Segundo - assistant of Juan
- Adalberto Parra .... Capitan Espíndola - chief of prison, villain
- Alejandro Rábago .... Pedro - friend of Juan
- Gonzalo Sánchez .... Facundo Gomez "El Tuerto" - one-eyed, owner of tavern
- Mónika Sánchez .... Rosa - waitress in tavern
- Jorge Valdés García .... assistant of Bautista
- Indra Zuno .... Meche - friend of Azucena, maid of Monica (Regina)
- Antonia Marcin .... Dolores - Cousin of Monica (Regina) and Aimeé
- Julio Monterde .... Fray Domingo - priest
- Queta Lavat .... Madre Superiora
- Arturo Paulet .... Lic. Mondragón
- Julián Velázquez
- Joana Brito .... Ana - cook at Campo Real
- Maribel Palmer .... Teresa - friend of Monica (Regina)
- Queta Carrasco .... Dona Prudencia - owner of the boarding house where Monica goes
- Araceli Cordero
- María Dolores Oliva .... Tehua - herbalist
- Julián de Tavira .... Juan (as a child)
- Christian Ruiz .... Andrés (as a child)
- Alicia del Lago
- Felio Eliel
- Chayo Grandos
- Carl Hillos
- Nelly Horsman
- Juan Antonio Llanes .... Judge Esperon
- Conchita Márquez .... Sor Juliana
- Géraldine Bazán
- Daniel Martinez .... Lieutenant

== Adaptations ==
There have been five Mexican productions based on the book, two films and three telenovelas, one of which was made in Puerto Rico. The most successful production was the 1993 telenovela starred by the late Edith González as Countess Mónica de Altamira de Alcazar y Valle and the late Eduardo Palomo as "Juan del Diablo" and Ana Colchero as Countess Aimée de Altamira de Alcazar y Valle . The story, however, adapted by María Zarattini, takes place in the port of Veracruz and the French surnames were changed to Spanish surnames (Molnar to de Altamira and D'Autremont to Alcázar y Valle).

Singer Angélica María played the role of Mónica in the 1968 film and the 1977 telenovela, which was filmed in cooperation with the Mexican Navy.

It was announced in August 2009 that there will be a new version of the novela coming soon starring Aracely Arámbula.

== Screen adaptations ==
=== Mexico ===
Production	Mónica Molnar/de Altamira de Alcázar y Valle/Regina Montes de Oca	Juan del Diablo	Aimeé Molnar/de Altamira de Alcázar y Valle/Montes de Oca	Renato D'Autremont/Vidal Montes de Oca/Andrés Alcázar y Valle
2009 telenovela	Aracely Arámbula	Eduardo Yáñez	Aracely Arámbula	Cristian de la Fuente
1993 telenovela	Edith González	Eduardo Palomo	Ana Colchero	Ariel López Padilla
1977 telenovela	Angélica María	Martin Cortés	Susana Dosamantes	Fernando Allende
1968 film	Angélica María	Julio Alemán	Teresa Velázquez	Manuel Gil
1966 telenovela	Julissa	Enrique Lizalde	Jacqueline Andere	Enrique Álvarez Félix
1956 film	Martha Roth	Carlos Navarro	Christiane Martel	Rafael Bertand

=== Puerto Rico ===
Production	Mónica Molnar	Juan del Diablo	Aimeé Molnar	Renato D'Autremont
Juan del Diablo (1960)	Gladys Rodríguez	Braulio Castillo	Martita Martínez	José Yedra

== International release ==
Country	TV Channels	Local Title
Romania	Acasa TV	Inima Salbatica
