= Corazón salvaje =

Corazón salvaje may refer to:

- Corazón salvaje (novel), a 1957 novel by Mexican writer Caridad Bravo Adams
- Corazón salvaje (1956 film), a Mexican film
- Corazón salvaje (1968 film), a Mexican film
- Corazón Salvaje (album), a compilation album by Mexican pop singer Mijares
- Corazón salvaje (1966 TV series), a Mexican telenovela produced and broadcast by Telesistema Mexicano (now Televisa)
- Corazón salvaje (1977 TV series), a Mexican telenovela, which was produced by and broadcast on Televisa
- Corazón salvaje (1993 TV series), a Mexican telenovela produced by José Rendón for Televisa
- Corazón salvaje (2009 TV series), a Mexican telenovela produced by Salvador Mejía Alejandre for Televisa, based on the novel
