= Tú eres mi destino =

Mexican telenovela

- Genre: Telenovela
- Created by: Julio Alejandro
- Written by: Luis Reyes de la Maza
- Directed by: José Rendón; Alfredo Saldaña
- Starring: Claudia Islas; Enrique Álvarez Félix; María Rubio; Laura Flores; Eduardo Yáñez; Óscar Servín
- Country of origin: Mexico
- Original language: Spanish
- No. of episodes: 90

Production
- Executive producer: Ernesto Alonso
- Cinematography: Carlos Guerra V. Carlos Sánchez Zuniga

Original release
- Network: Canal de las Estrellas
- Release: 1984 – 1984

Related
- Un solo corazón; Aprendiendo a vivir; Cartas de amor (1960) Cartas sin destino (1973) Cartas sem destino (1986)

Tú eres mi destino (English title:You are my destiny) is a Mexican telenovela produced by Ernesto Alonso for Televisa in 1984. It is an adaptation of the telenovela Cartas sin destino produced in 1973.

Claudia Islas starred as antagonistic protagonist with Enrique Álvarez Félix and María Rubio.

== Plot ==
The writer and journalist Eugenio Dávila loses his wife and his daughter in a plane crash that also hurts him.

== Cast ==
- Claudia Islas as Rebeca de Dávila
- Enrique Álvarez Félix as Eugenio Dávila
- María Rubio as Úrsula
- Óscar Servín as José Luis
- Norma Lazareno as Mercedes
- Miguel Manzano as Don Fausto
- Laura Flores as Rosa Martha
- Ninón Sevilla as Licha del Rey
- Eduardo Yáñez as Fabián
- Marcela de Galina as Esperanza
- Edna Bolkán as Paulina
- Molina as Karina
- Tony Bravo as Javier
- Fernando Sáenz as Homero
- Alicia Osorio as Gloria
- Luis Mario as José María
- Aurora Alonso as Vicenta
- Sara Guash as Carolina
- Uriel Chavez Posada as León
- Francisco Avendaño as Fernando
- Carmen Cortés as Braulia
- Queta Carrasco as Jacinta
- Alfredo Castillo as Francisco
- María Marcela as Esperanza

== Awards ==
Year	Award	Category	Nominee	Result
1985	3rd TVyNovelas Awards	Best Male Revelation	Tony Bravo	Nominated
