= Corazón salvaje (1993 TV series) =

Mexican television series, 1993–1994

- Corazón salvaje DVD cover
- Genre: Telenovela; Romance; Drama
- Created by: Caridad Bravo Adams
- Written by: María Zarattini
- Directed by: José Rendón; Alberto Cortés
- Starring: Edith González; Eduardo Palomo; Ana Colchero; Ariel López Padilla; Enrique Lizalde; Claudia Islas; Luz María Aguilar
- Theme music composer: Jorge Avendaño Lührs
- Opening theme: Corazón salvaje by Manuel Mijares; Romanza by Plácido Domingo (only in Spain)
- Ending theme: Corazón salvaje
- Country of origin: Mexico
- Original language: Spanish
- No. of episodes: 160

Production
- Executive producer: José Rendón
- Production locations: Puerto Vallarta, Jalisco
- Cinematography: Jorge Miguel Valdés
- Running time: 21-22 minutes
- Production company: Televisa

Original release
- Network: Canal de las Estrellas
- Release: July 5, 1993 – February 18, 1994

Related
- Corazón salvaje (1966) Corazón salvaje (1977) Corazón salvaje (2009–2010)

Corazón Salvaje (Wild Heart) is a Mexican telenovela produced by José Rendón for Televisa in 1993. In addition to breaking audience records in issue, it is one of the most memorable and most successful telenovelas of all time. It is the third television adaptation by Maria Zarattini, about the legendary love triangle between two young countesses, Monica and Aimée with the illegitimate son of a wealthy landowner, Juan del Diablo. The historical advisor for this telenovela was Jose Ruiz de Esparza who also advised the production of Alondra also starred by Ana Colchero in the title role.

Edith González and Eduardo Palomo starred as protagonists, while Ana Colchero, Ariel López Padilla, Arsenio Campos and the leading actress Claudia Islas starred as antagonists. César Évora, Isaura Espinoza, Yolanda Ventura, the leading actresses Luz María Aguilar, Queta Lavat, Queta Carrasco, and the leading actors Julio Monterde and Enrique Lizalde starred as stellar performances.

== Plot ==
Francisco Alcazar is a wealthy landowner, who owns sugar cane fields. Francisco is married to Sofia, a severe and uncompassionate woman, with whom he has a son named Andres. Before his marriage to Sofia, Francisco had an affair with a married woman who was physically abused by her husband. The woman became pregnant and died when the child was 3 years old.

This love-child is, in fact, Francisco's true firstborn. When this woman became pregnant, her husband refused to recognize the boy as his son. He also did not allow Francisco to recognize the child as his own. Thus, the boy named "Juan", became known as "Juan del Diablo" (Juan of the Devil) because he had no last name. Juan's mother eventually died of the shame and from the physical abuse she had received from her husband.

Juan was raised with no love or instruction, in poverty and neglect. In his early teens, Juan's stepfather dies. Francisco, hiding the fact that Juan is his son, decides to invite him to live at his estate with his family, on the pretext of being a playmate for Andrés. Sofia finds out the truth and tries to send Juan away, to which Francisco objects.

Finally, Francisco has an accident while riding his horse before he could legally recognize Juan as his son. Francisco leaves a letter with his intentions addressed to his friend and lawyer Noel Mancera. Sofia seizes the letter and hides it. On his deathbed, Francisco sends for his son Andrés, and while not telling the truth, asks him to care for Juan as a brother. After his death, Sofía sends Juan away without saying anything to Andrés.

Eventually, Sofia decides to send Andrés to boarding school in Spain. Juan grows up among the sailors and pirates of the port-city, earning a shocking reputation for dirty business (contraband of liquor), ruthlessness, and harboring unbound loyalty from his men. Juan is also a womanizer, his heart is still untaken. He has learned the identity of his biological father because Noel Mancera has told him.

Through the years, Mancera has given Juan some education, and even offered to give him his last name. However, Juan refuses the offer because he feels that a last name is unwarranted in his chosen occupation. Meanwhile, Mónica and Aimée are two beautiful young countesses, daughters of the deceased Count of Altamira, a distant cousin of Sofia de Alcazar. The Altamira family are very respectable in high society, but they now find themselves in bankruptcy.

Their only asset is their nobility and beauty, and the long promise of betrothal between Monica and Andrés. Unfortunately for Mónica, Andres has forgotten about their engagement. While visiting Mexico City, Andres meets Mónica's younger sister. Aimee is beautiful, flirty and selfish. She shows interest in Andrés because he has wealth, influence, and power. Andrés falls completely in love with Aimée, a fact he later shares with his mother when she comes to visit him.

When Sofia returns home, she informs Catalina de Altamira that Andres has broken the engagement with Monica because he is now intent on marrying Aimee. Catalina is mortified at the thought of Monica's heartbreak. With her family's financial ruin in mind, Catalina reluctantly agrees to an engagement between Aimee and Andres. When Monica discovers that Andres has broken their engagement in order to marry her sister, she is immediately heartbroken.

Monica decides to enter a convent to become a nun. Monica denies her feelings for Andres and tells everyone that becoming a nun is her true calling. Meanwhile, Aimée returns to her hometown with her mother. One day, while walking along the beach, she spies Juan taking a bath in his beach house. Aimee had never met Juan and is unaware of his past or his connection to the Alcazar family.

She watches him from a distance, but Juan sees her. Over the next few days, Aimee returns several times to spy on Juan. He decides to confront her and catches her while she's hiding. Soon after, Juan and Aimée fall in love and become lovers. Juan goes away on a business trip and Aimee promises to wait for his return and marry him. When Andres arrives in his hometown, Aimée ignores her promise to Juan and agrees to marry Andres.

Juan returns from his business trip several weeks later as a millionaire. Juan discovers that Aimee is now married to his half-brother and decides to kidnap her so that she carries out her promise. Andres, who knows nothing about his kinship to Juan and the affair between him and his wife, decides to employ him as the steward of Campo Real, his country estate.

Meanwhile, Monica leaves the convent to spend some time in the countryside with her family. Monica quickly discovers the affair between Juan and Aimee. Monica confronts her sister, but Aimee refuses to end her affair with Juan. Since Monica decides to leave the convent, Andres attempts to redeem himself by proposing an engagement between Monica and his friend Alberto de la Serna. Meanwhile, Andres learns that Juan is actually his brother and that he had an unseemly affair with a young lady in his household.

Andres immediately assumes that the lady in question is Monica. Because of this misunderstanding, Monica is pressured to get married immediately. Monica agrees to get married in an attempt to protect Andres and her sister from the impending scandal, but she refuses to marry Alberto. Instead, Monica decides to marry Juan because she believes this is the only way to prevent Aimee to continue her affair with him. In an unexpected turn of events, Juan accepts to marry Monica.

Aimee is filled with jealousy and rage at the thought of Juan being married to her sister. Aimee spends all her time plotting and scheming to destroy Monica's engagement to Juan. Unfortunately for Aimee, Juan is no longer interested in her. He is now captivated by Monica's beauty and her kind demeanor. At the same time, Monica discovers a whole different side to Juan's personality.

Monica learns that despite Juan's rough exterior, he can also be kind, gentle, and noble. Against all odds, Monica and Juan slowly begin to fall in love. Their happiness is short lived when Andres finds out about Juan's affair with Aimée.

== Cast ==
- Edith González as Countess Mónica de Altamira Montero de Alcazar y Valle
- Eduardo Palomo as Juan "del Diablo" Alcázar y Valle/Francisco Alcázar y Valle
- Ana Colchero as Countess Aimeé de Altamira Montero de Alcazar y Valle
- Ariel López Padilla as Carlos Andrés Francisco Alcázar y Valle
- Enrique Lizalde as Noel Mancera
- Claudia Islas as Sofía Molina Vda. de Alcázar y Valle
- Luz María Aguilar as Countess Catalina Montero Vda. de Altamira
- Arsenio Campos as Alberto de la Serna
- Ernesto Yáñez as Bautista Rosales
- Yolanda Ventura as Azucena
- Javier Ruán as Guadalupe Cajiga
- César Évora as Marcelo Romero Vargas
- Isaura Espinoza as Amanda Monterrubio Vda. de Romero Vargas
- Verónica Merchant as Mariana Romero Vargas/Mariana Mancera
- Olivia Cairo as Juanita
- Emilio Cortés as Serafín Campero
- Ana Laura Espinosa as Lupe
- Gerardo Hemmer as Joaquín Martínez
- Jaime Lozano as Segundo Quintana
- Adalberto Parra as Captain Espíndola
- Alejandro Rábago as Pedro
- Gonzalo Sánchez as Facundo Gómez "El Tuerto"
- Mónika Sánchez as Rosa
- Indra Zuno as Meche
- Antonia Marcin as Dolores Peñaloza de Altamira
- Julio Monterde as Fray Domingo
- Queta Lavat as Mother Superior
- Arturo Paulet as Lic. Mondragón
- Joana Brito as Ana
- Maribel Palmer as Teresa
- Queta Carrasco as Doña Prudencia Santa María
- María Dolores Oliva as Tehua
- Juan Antonio Llanes as Judge Esperón
- Conchita Márquez as Nun Juliana
- Jorge Valdés García as Bautista Rosales's assistant
- Géraldine Bazán as Mónica (child)
- Julián de Tavira as Juan (child)
- Christian Ruiz as Andrés Alcázar y Valle (child)
- Baldovino
- Alicia del Lago
- Felio Eliel
- Charito Granados
- Nelly Horsman
- Carl Hillos
- Araceli Cordero
- Julián Velázquez

== Awards ==
Year	Award	Category	Nominee	Result
1994	12th TVyNovelas Awards	Best Telenovela of the Year	José Rendón	Won
1994	12th TVyNovelas Awards	Best Actress	Edith González	Won
1994	12th TVyNovelas Awards	Best Actor	Eduardo Palomo	Won
1994	12th TVyNovelas Awards	Best Leading Actress	Claudia Islas	Won
1994	12th TVyNovelas Awards	Best Leading Actor	Enrique Lizalde	Nominated
1994	12th TVyNovelas Awards	Best Female Revelation	Ana Colchero	Won
1994	12th TVyNovelas Awards	Best Female Revelation	Yolanda Ventura	Nominated
1994	12th TVyNovelas Awards	Best Male Revelation	Ariel López Padilla	Won
1994	12th TVyNovelas Awards	Best Male Revelation	César Évora	Nominated
1994	12th TVyNovelas Awards	Best Musical Theme	Manuel Mijares	Won
1994	Premios El Heraldo de México	Best Telenovela	José Rendón	Won
1994	Premios El Heraldo de México	Best Television Actor	Eduardo Palomo	Won
1994	Premios Telegatto (Italia)	Best Telenovela of the Year in Italy		Won
1995	Premios TP de Oro	Best Telenovela		Won
1996	La Giara d'Argento Awards	Best Telenovela		Won

== International Broadcasters of Corazón salvaje ==
North Central & South America, Caribbean

- Mexico
- Colombia
- Chile
- Bolivia
- Dominican Republic
- Brazil
- Costa Rica
- Panama
- Ecuador
- El Salvador
- Argentina
- Paraguay
- Uruguay
- Peru
- Venezuela
- Puerto Rico
- United States

Europe, Africa, Asia & Oceania

- Spain
- Italy
- Greece
- Romania
- Croatia
- Kenya
- Indonesia
- Georgia
- Lebanon
