= La tierra =

Mexican telenovela

- Genre: Telenovela
- Created by: Marissa Garrido; Arturo Schoening
- Directed by: Ignacio Rubiell
- Starring: Claudia Islas; Ernesto Alonso
- Country of origin: Mexico
- Original language: Spanish

Production
- Executive producer: Ernesto Alonso
- Cinematography: Alfredo Saldaña; Ernesto Alonso

Original release
- Network: Canal de las Estrellas
- Release: 1973 – 1975

La tierra, is a Mexican telenovela produced by Ernesto Alonso for Televisa in 1973. Starring Claudia Islas and Ernesto Alonso.

== Cast ==
- Claudia Islas as Lucía
- Ernesto Alonso as Don Antonio
- Jorge Luke as Hilario
- Enrique Lizalde as Alvaro
- Lucía Méndez as Olivia
- Irma Serrano as Martina
- Rita Macedo as Consuelo
- José Alonso as Alberto
- Rebeca Silva as Blanca
- Norma Lazareno as Gabriela
- Aarón Hernán as Nacho
- Martha Zavaleta as Petra
- Raquel Olmedo as Raymunda
- Carmen Montejo as Cordelia
- Héctor Sáez as Padre Juan
- Eric del Castillo as Estrada
- Ricardo Mondragón as Don Lupe
- Roberto Antúnez as Marianito
- José Antonio Ferral as Marcelo
- Alfonso Meza as Alfonso
- Arsenio Campos as Carlos
- Gustavo Rojo
- Jose Chavez Trowe as Reyes
- Noe Murayama as Fernando
- Natalia “Kiki” Herrera Calles as Rosaura
- Oscar Morelli as Ornelas
- Raul Mena as Jacinto
- Armando Acosta as Odilon
- Carlos Agosti as Rafael
- Guillermo Zarur as Don Fermin
- Miguel Manzano
- Florinda Meza
- César Bono
- Pedro Regueiro
- Victorio Blanco
- Ponciano del Castillo
