= Corazón salvaje (1966 TV series) =

- Genre: Telenovela
- Written by: Caridad Bravo Adams
- Directed by: Ernesto Alonso
- Starring: Julissa; Enrique Lizalde; Jacqueline Andere; Enrique Álvarez Félix
- Music by: Luis Demetrio
- Opening theme: Corazón Salvaje (Julissa)
- Country of origin: Mexico
- Original language: Spanish
- No. of episodes: 62

Production
- Producer: Ernesto Alonso
- Cinematography: José Morris
- Running time: 30 minutes
- Production company: Telesistema Mexicano

Original release
- Network: Canal 2
- Release: 1966

Corazón salvaje (English: Wild Heart) is a Mexican telenovela produced and broadcast by Telesistema Mexicano (now Televisa) in 1966. It is the second of five screen adaptations of the novel of the same name by Caridad Bravo Adams. This telenovela starred singer Julissa while the 1977 production starred singer Angélica María who had previously had the role of Mónica in the 1968 film version. Actor Ernesto Alonso produced both telenovela versions. The role of Juan del Diablo went to Enrique Lizalde who, with Julissa, had previously starred in another Bravo Adams’ story, La mentira.

This was the first starring role of Enrique Álvarez Félix, son of actress María Félix, in the role of the antagonist Renato Duchamp, the legitimate half-brother of Juan del Diablo. It was also the second time Jacqueline Andere (in the role of Aimée, Monica's sister) co-starred with Enrique Lizalde, both being stage actors.

== Cast ==
- Julissa as Mónica Molinar
- Enrique Lizalde as Juan "del Diablo""
- Jacqueline Andere as Aimée Molinar
- Enrique Álvarez Félix as Renato Duchamp
- Miguel Manzano as Noel
- Graciela Nájera
- Beatriz Baz
- Fanny Schiller
- Socorro Avelar as Ana
- Humberto Jiménez Pons
- Fedora Capdevilla as Kuma

== See also ==
- Corazón salvaje
- Juan del Diablo – the Puerto Rican version
