= Lo imperdonable =

Lo imperdonable may refer to:

- Lo imperdonable (1963 TV series)
- Lo imperdonable (1975 TV series), original telenovela of Caridad Bravo Adams and Fernanda Villeli
- Lo imperdonable (2015 TV series), telenovela based on La Mentira and produced by Salvador Mejía
