= Cartas de amor =

Cartas de amor may refer to:

- Cartas de amor (film), Argentine film, see List of Argentine films of 1951
- Cartas de amor (telenovela), Mexican telenovela
