= Duelo de pasiones =

Duelo de pasiones may refer to either of two Mexican telenovelas produced and aired by Televisa:

- Duelo de pasiones (1968 TV series)
- Duelo de pasiones (2006 TV series)
