= Corazón salvaje (2009 TV series) =

Mexican telenovela

- Genre: Telenovela; Historical fiction Romance
- Based on: Corazón salvaje by Caridad Bravo Adams & Yo compro esa mujer by Olga Ruilópez
- Developed by: Liliana Abud
- Written by: Ricardo Fiallega; Dolores Ortega
- Directed by: Salvador Garcini; Jorge Édgar Ramírez; Alberto Diaz
- Starring: Aracely Arámbula; Eduardo Yáñez; Cristián de la Fuente; Enrique Rocha; Helena Rojo; María Rojo; Laura Flores; Laisha Wilkins; René Casados; Elizabeth Gutiérrez; Osvaldo Ríos
- Narrated by: Julio Alemán
- Theme music composer: J. Eduardo Murguía; Mauricio L. Arriaga
- Opening theme: Me enamoré de tí by Chayanne
- Country of origin: Mexico
- Original language: Spanish
- No. of episodes: 135

Production
- Executive producer: Salvador Mejía Alejandre
- Production locations: Veracruz, Veracruz, Mexico
- Cinematography: Diego Lascuráin
- Editor: Mauricio Coronel Cortex
- Running time: 44 minutes
- Production company: Televisa

Original release
- Network: Canal de las Estrellas
- Release: October 12, 2009 – April 16, 2010

Related
- Corazón salvaje (1966); Corazón salvaje (1977); Corazón salvaje (1993); Yo compro esa mujer (1990)

Corazón salvaje (English: Wild Heart) is a Mexican telenovela produced by Salvador Mejía Alejandre for Televisa in 2009. It is based on the novel Corazón salvaje from 1957.

The series stars Aracely Arámbula, Eduardo Yáñez, Cristián de la Fuente, Enrique Rocha, Helena Rojo, María Rojo, Laura Flores, Laisha Wilkins, René Casados, Elizabeth Gutiérrez and Osvaldo Ríos.

== Plot ==
In the year 1851 near the port city of Veracruz, María del Rosario (Laura Flores) falls in love with Juan de Dios San Román (Osvaldo Ríos), a humble fisherman, unaware that another man, Rodrigo Montes de Oca (Enrique Rocha), is in love with her. María del Rosario confesses her love for Juan de Dios to her sister, Leonarda (Helena Rojo), and tells her of their plans to wed, unbeknownst that Leonarda harbors a deep hatred for her sister because she is secretly in love with Rodrigo. Leonarda tells Rodrigo about her sister's wedding plans, and he uses his influence with the authorities to stop the wedding and incarcerate Juan de Dios for life. While visiting him in prison, María del Rosario confesses to Juan de Dios that she is expecting their child. Rodrigo and Leonarda decide to confine María del Rosario to an estate by the sea. Juan de Dios escapes from jail and searches for María del Rosario, but Rodrigo discovers their plans to escape and tries to shoot him. Juan de Dios flees the estate as María del Rosario has begged; he swears he will return for her and their child. María del Rosario gives birth to her son. Leonarda has a servant leave the newborn boy in the jungle to die, while lying to her sister that the baby died. Upon hearing the news, María del Rosario spirals into insanity. Leonarda decides to deceive Rodrigo and pass her sister off as dead while locking María del Rosario away in the estate’s basement dungeon. All the while, María del Rosario's son has been rescued from the jungle by Remigio. He adopts the boy as his brother and takes the child to be raised by Aurora who baptizes him as Juan de Dios, as requested by a note left with the baby.

Leonarda expects to win Rodrigo after her sister's supposed death. When Rodrigo responds by leaving Mexico, she decides to marry Noel Vidal (René Casados), Rodrigo's friend, who she does not love. After a few years, they have a son, Renato (Cristián de la Fuente).

Rodrigo announces his return, and Leonarda believes that he is returning for her, but to her great surprise, he arrives married to Constanza (Laisha Wilkins), who is expecting a child. Out of jealousy and anger, Leonarda poisons Constanza. She dies shortly after giving birth to twins Regina and Aimée (both portrayed by Aracely Arámbula).

Time passes, in 1880, the now adult Juan decides to return to Mexico to fulfill a deathbed oath he made to his father to seek revenge against Rodrigo Montes de Oca. Only now, Juan has taken the surnames of his adoptive parents. On the ship to Mexico, Juan meets Aimée, who is impressed with him and a torrid relationship full of eroticism and sensuality is born between the two, even though Juan portrays himself to Aimée as a humble poor man. Regina, Aimée's twin sister, disapproves of their relationship. Meanwhile, Regina wants to marry Renato because she has been in love with him since childhood, but he is in love with Aimée, so Regina enters a convent and becomes a nun. Juan discovers eventually that Aimée is the daughter of his worst enemy and angrily rejects her. He considers Aimée and Regina innocent of their father’s treachery against his father and thus leaves Veracruz. Aimée, rejected by Juan, marries Renato as she cannot live without the luxuries he offers.

Thus begins a story of adultery, lies, deceptions, paralleled against the love born between two unsuspecting people who will face trials and tribulations in order to fight for their love for one another.

== Cast ==
=== Main ===
Actor	Character
Aracely Arámbula	Regina Montes de Oca / Aimée Montes de Oca
Eduardo Yáñez	Juan del Diablo
Cristián de la Fuente	Renato Vidal Montes de Oca
Enrique Rocha	Rodrigo Montes de Oca
Helena Rojo	Leonarda
María Rojo	Clemencia
Laura Flores	María del Rosario
Laisha Wilkins	Constanza
René Casados	Noel Vidal
Elizabeth Gutiérrez	Rosenda
Osvaldo Ríos	Juan de Dios

=== Also main ===
Actor	Character
Sebastián Zurita	Gabriel
Angelique Boyer	Jimena
Alejandro Ávila	Pablo Miranda
Lisardo	Federico Martín del Campo
Manuel Ojeda	Fulgencio Berrón
Salvador Pineda	Arcadio

=== Supporting ===
Actor	Character
Silvia Manríquez	Magda / Marlene
Isabel Madow	Brigitte
Zaneta Seilerova	Fifí
Michelle Ramaglia	Lulú
Benny Emanuel	Calibri
Arturo García Tenorio	Santos
Ignacio Guadalupe	Pedro
Toño Infante	Celestino
Sergio Acosta	Servando
Mayahuel del Monte	Mirta
Susana Lozano	Mariela Villarreal
Roxana Rojo de la Vega	Salma
Karla Sofía Gascón	Branko
Ivonne Ley	Mabel
Fernando Robles	Alguacil
Ricardo Kleinbaum	Philip
Adriano Zendejas	Juan del diablo (child)
Alejandro Felipe	Remigio García (child)
Saraí Meza	Regina Montes de Oca / Aimée Montes de Oca (child)
Luis Gatica	Remigio García
Julio Alemán	Narrator
Archie Lafranco	Santiago Aldama
Raymundo Capetillo	Raúl de Marín
Gustavo Rojo	Alberto Villarreal
Rosángela Balbó	Inés De Villarreal
Lucía Guilmáin	Griselda
Lola Merino	Eloísa

== Awards and nominations ==
Year	Award	Category	Nominee	Result
2009	1st People en Español Awards			
2009	1st People en Español Awards	Return of the Year	Aracely Arámbula	Won
2010	28th TVyNovelas Awards			
2010	28th TVyNovelas Awards	Best Telenovela	Salvador Mejía	Nominated
2010	28th TVyNovelas Awards	Best Actress	Aracely Arámbula	Nominated
2010	28th TVyNovelas Awards	Best Antagonist Actress	Aracely Arámbula	Nominated
2010	28th TVyNovelas Awards	Best Antagonist Actor	Cristián de la Fuente	Nominated
2010	28th TVyNovelas Awards	Best Leading Actress	Helena Rojo	Nominated
2010	28th TVyNovelas Awards	Best Leading Actor	Enrique Rocha	Nominated
2010	28th TVyNovelas Awards	Best Co-lead Actress	Laura Flores	Nominated
2010	28th TVyNovelas Awards	Best Young Lead Actress	Angelique Boyer	Nominated
2010	28th TVyNovelas Awards	Best Musical Theme	"Me enamoré de ti" by Chayanne	Nominated
2010	2nd People en Español Awards			
2010	2nd People en Español Awards	Best Young Lead Actress or Actor	Angelique Boyer	Nominated
2010	2nd People en Español Awards	Best Young Lead Actress or Actor	Sebastián Zurita	Nominated

== Broadcast ==
Corazón Salvaje premiered on Monday, October 12, 2009, replacing Sortilegio. The final episode was broadcast on Friday, April 16, 2010, and it was replaced by Soy tu dueña. In the United States, it premiered on Monday, February 22, 2010 on Univision at 9 PM, again replacing Sortilegio. Beginning Monday, April 26, 2010, Corazón Salvaje was moved from prime time to the midnight time slot due to its low ratings.

=== Rating ===
Corazón Salvaje debuted in Mexico with a rating of 25.8 and a share of 42.1%.

Corazón Salvaje debuted in United States with a rating of 4.1 million viewers.
