= Ada Carrasco =

Mexican actress (1912–1994)

- Born: 14 September 1912; Mexico City, Mexico
- Died: 5 April 1994 (aged 81); Mexico City, Mexico
- Years active: 1952–1994

Ada Carrasco (14 September 1912 – 5 April 1994) was a Mexican film and television actress.

== Early life ==
Carrasco was born in Mexico City, the daughter of Honorato Carrasco, an engineer, and the opera star Ada Navarrete.

== Career ==
Carrasco started her career as an actress in 1952, and went on to make over 38 soap operas, including Los Ricos También Lloran, with Verónica Castro in 1979, Rosa Salvaje in 1987, De Frente al Sol in 1992, Más Allá del Puente in 1994, and finally, her last soap opera was made in 1994 in Marimar with Thalía.

She died of a heart attack on 5 April 1994.

She was also known for various film appearances from Two Mules for Sister Sara (1970) where she acted opposite Clint Eastwood and Shirley Maclean, to OK Mister Pancho (1981) where she starred as a woman who travels to the United States with María Elena Velasco's character of La India María.

== Personal life ==
Ada Carrasco's younger sister Queta Carrasco was also an actress as well as Ada's daughter Malena Doria. Ada Carrasco is the grandmother of Andrea Rodríguez and producer Magda Rodríguez, and the great-grandmother of the actress Andrea Escalona.

== Selected filmography ==
- Tres hombres en mi vida (1952)
- Forbidden Fruit (1953) - Señora Luz María Gómez (uncredited)
- Women Who Work (1953) - Espectadora defile de modas (uncredited)
- The Photographer (1953) - Enfermera (uncredited)
- El buen ladrón (1957)
- Alma de acero (1957) - Doña Soledad de Gallardo
- The Bravados (1958) - Sra. Parral (uncredited)
- Mysteries of Black Magic (1958) - Espectadora nerviosa
- Kermesse (1959) - Doña Rita
- Nazarin (1959) - Josefa
- Manicomio (1959) - Lola
- Sonatas (1959) - Nana
- El puma (1959) - Doña Luisa
- A tiro limpio (1960) - Doña Luisa
- El tesoro de Chucho el Roto (1960) - Blanca viuda de Villalta
- Tin Tan y las modelos (1960) - Tía Eulalia (uncredited)
- Simitrio (1960) - Mamá de Simitrio (uncredited)
- Sobre el muerto las coronas (1961) - Tía de Marina
- La Leona (1961, TV Series)
- Juventud sin Dios (La vida del padre Lambert) (1962) - Madre de Andres
- Los secretos del sexo débil (1962)
- El tejedor de milagros (1962) - Doña Agustina
- Atrás de las nubes (1962) - Beata chismosa (uncredited)
- Un tipo a todo dar (1963) - Abuela
- Casa de huéspedes (1964)
- El señor doctor (1965) - Doña Lola
- Los Cuervos están de luto (1965) - Esposa de Acasio
- Especialista en chamacas (1965)
- Maria Isabel (1966, TV Series) - Chona
- El barón Brakola (1967) - Aurora
- Si quiero (1967) - Mamá de novia
- Los años verdes (1967)
- Novias impacientes (1967)
- El juicio de los hijos (1967, TV Series)
- Santo vs. the Villains of the Ring (1968) - Maquilladora (uncredited)
- Los recuerdos del porvenir (1969)
- El libro de piedra (1969) - Paulina
- La casa de las muchachas (1969)
- Two Mules for Sister Sara (1970) - Juan's Mother
- Simplemente vivir (1970) - María
- Una vez, un hombre... (1971)
- Temporada salvaje (1971)
- Elena y Raquel (1971)
- Lucía Sombra (1971, TV Series) - Campesina
- Mi mesera (1973)
- Renzo, el gitano (1973)
- Me caí de la nube (1974) - Doña María
- La casa de Bernarda Alba (1974, TV Movie) - Josefa, la abuela
- El elegido (1977) - Madre de Andres
- La puerta falsa (1977)
- Balún Canán (1977) - La tullida
- Las mariposas disecadas (1978) - Gloria / Maid
- El cuatro dedos (1978)
- Los amantes frios (1978) - Doña Chona (segment "El Soplador del vidrio")
- Pedro Páramo (1978) - Madre de Pedro Páramo
- Los triunfadores (1978) - Mamá de Fernando
- Ardiente secreto (1978, TV Series)
- La India blanca (1979) - Doña Juana, madre de Rutilo
- Los Ricos También Lloran (1979, TV Series) - Felipa
- Dos hermanos murieron (1980)
- Hijos de tigre (1980) - Doña Chonita
- El gatillo de la muerte (1980)
- Pistoleros famosos (1981) - Lucio's Mother
- Okey, Mister Pancho (1981) - Mujer inmigrante
- Fuego en el mar (1981) - Rosario
- La combi asesina (1982) - Daniela
- Bianca Vidal (1982, TV Series) - Vicenta
- Un hombre llamado el diablo (1983)
- Fieras en brama (1983) - Nana
- Maldita miseria (1983) - Doña Cholita
- Lazos de sangre (1983)
- El regreso del carro rojo (1984) - Dona Amalia
- El criminal (1985)
- Pistoleros famosos II (1986)
- Tierra de rencores (1986)
- Rosa Salvaje (1987, TV Series) - Carmen
- Amor en silencio (1988, TV Series) - Ada
- El gran relajo mexicano (1988)
- Maton de rancho (1988)
- Central camionera (1988)
- Mi segunda madre (1989, TV Series) - Dolores
- El chácharas (1989)
- One Man Out (1989) - Peasant Lady
- Atrapados (1990)
- Amor de nadie (1990, TV Series) - Cony (1990)
- Con el amor no se juega (1991) - Sirvienta
- Como Agua Para Chocolate (1991) - Nacha
- Jefe de vigilancia (1992)
- De frente al sol (1992, TV Series) - Lich
- Mas allá del puente (1993) - Doña Ema
- Marimar (1994, TV Series) - Mamá Cruz (final appearance)
