= Elisa (1979 TV series) =

- Genre: Telenovela
- Created by: Kenia Perea
- Directed by: José Morris
- Starring: Raquel Olmedo; Javier Ruán
- Country of origin: Mexico
- Original language: Spanish
- No. of episodes: 20

Production
- Executive producer: Irene Sabido
- Cinematography: José Morris

Original release
- Network: Canal de las Estrellas
- Release: 1979

Related
- Elisa (1959)

Elisa is a Mexican telenovela produced by Irene Sabido for Televisa in 1979.

== Cast ==
- Raquel Olmedo as Elisa
- Javier Ruán
- Carmen Salinas
- Sergio Kleiner
- María Martin
- Antonio Brillas
- Ana Silvia
- María Fernánda
- Mario Pintor
- Mariana Garza
- Elisa Eyms
- Maricuca
