= La sombra del otro (1963 TV series) =

- Genre: Telenovela
- Country of origin: Mexico
- Original language: Spanish

Original release
- Network: Telesistema Mexicano
- Release: 1963

Related
- La sombra del otro

La sombra del otro is a Mexican telenovela produced by Televisa for Telesistema Mexicano in 1963.

== Cast ==
- Aldo Monti
- Luz María Aguilar
- Alicia Montoya
- Raquel Olmedo
- Francisco Jambrina
- Maruja Grifell
- Jorge Mondragón
- Fedora Capdevila
- Eric del Castillo
- Julio Monterde
