= La mentira (1965 TV series) =

- Genre: Telenovela
- Created by: Caridad Bravo Adams
- Directed by: Ernesto Alonso
- Starring: Julissa; Enrique Lizalde; Fanny Cano; Enrique Rocha
- Opening theme: "Se te olvida" by Pepe Jara
- Country of origin: Mexico
- Original language: Spanish
- No. of episodes: 62

Production
- Executive producer: Ernesto Alonso
- Running time: 30 minutes

Original release
- Network: Telesistema Mexicano
- Release: 1965

Related
- La mentira (1998 TV series) (remake)

La mentira is a Mexican telenovela produced by Ernesto Alonso for Telesistema Mexicano in 1965. It was set in the Brazilian state Amazonas.

== Cast ==
- Julissa as Verónica
- Enrique Lizalde as Demetrio
- Fanny Cano as Virginia
- Enrique Rocha as Jhonny
- Alicia Montoya
- Miguel Manzano
- Chela Nájera
- Manolo García
- Aarón Hernán
- Malena Doria
- Carmen Cortés
- Leandro Martínez
