= Corazón salvaje (1968 film) =

1968 film by Tito Davison

- Directed by: Tito Davison
- Written by: Caridad Bravo Adams (original); Tito Davison (adaptation)
- Produced by: Felipe Subervielle
- Starring: Angélica María; Julio Alemán; Teresa Velázquez
- Cinematography: Gabriel Figueroa; Alex Phillips
- Edited by: Carlos Savage
- Music by: Gustavo César Carrión
- Release date: 1968
- Running time: 95 minutes
- Language: Spanish
- Box office: 41.6 million tickets (Soviet Union)

Corazón salvaje ("Wild at Heart") was the second film adaptation of the 1957 Caridad Bravo Adams novel of the same name. It is considered the closest to the original story.

The first film was made in 1956 and starred Martha Roth. The 1968 version starred Julio Alemán in the role of Juan del Diablo and Angélica María as Mónica Molnar – this part made her a star in China. She later reprised her role in the 1977 telenovela version.

== Cast ==
- Julio Alemán as Juan del Diablo
- Angélica María as Mónica Molnar
- Teresa Velázquez as Aimée Molnar
- Manuel Gil
- Beatriz Baz
- Miguel Macía
- José Baviera
- Sara Guasch
- Sandra Chávez
- Rafael Llamas
- Antonio Bravo
- Consuelo Frank
- Carlos Agostí
- Eduardo MacGregor
- Víctor Alcocer
- Antonio Raxel
- Ramiro Orci
- Manuel Garay
- Juan Antonio Edwards
- Roberto Haughton

== Plot ==
For the story read the article on the novel Corazón salvaje.

== See also ==
- Corazón salvaje
