= Angélica María =

Mexican singer and actress (born 1944)

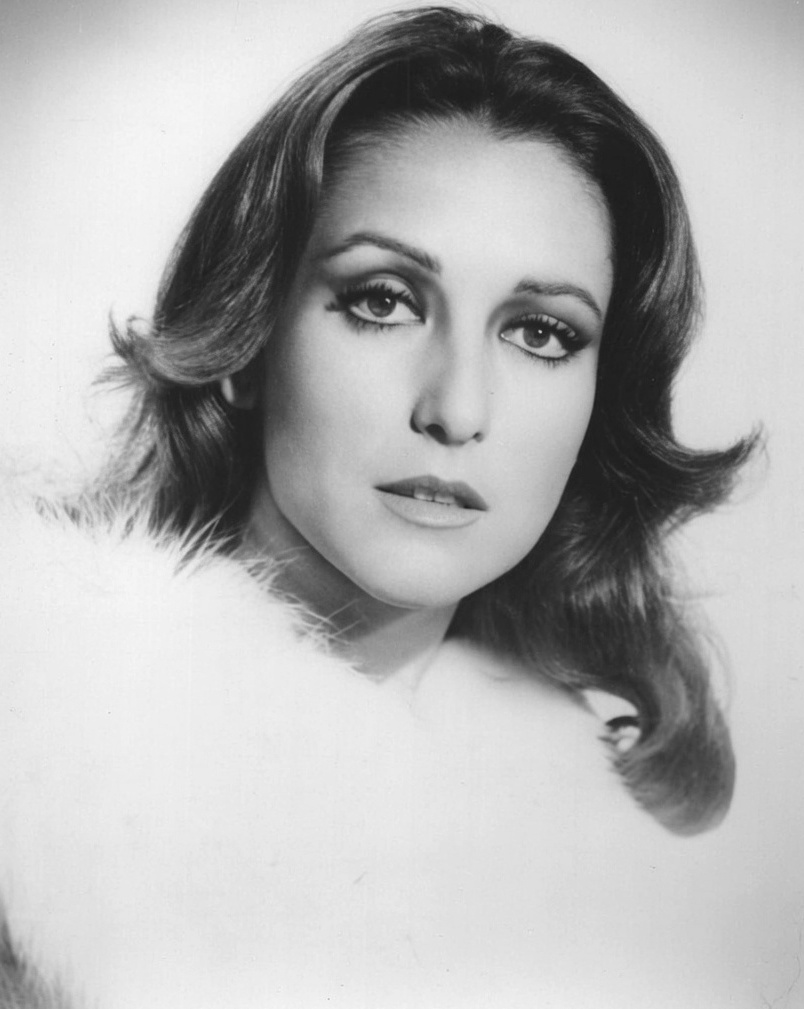
- Angélica María in 1978
- Born: September 27, 1944 (age 82); New Orleans, Louisiana, U.S.
- Other name: La Novia de México
- Citizenship: United States (by birthplace); Mexico (from mother)
- Occupations: Actress; singer
- Years active: 1950–present
- Children: Angélica Vale
- Musical career
- Genres: Rock and roll; pop; Latin ballad
- Instruments: Vocals

Angélica María Hartman Ortiz (born September 27, 1944) is a Mexican singer and actress. Referred to as "La Novia de México" ("Mexico's Sweetheart"), she began her career as a child actress in films of the Golden Age of Mexican cinema, such as Pecado (1951), Una mujer decente (1951), and Mi esposa y la otra (1952). During the 1960s, she rose to prominence as a teen idol through her roles in films and telenovelas, concurrently launching a successful music career. Her recordings of compositions by Armando Manzanero established her as a popular singer of rock and roll and pop ballads, with hit songs including the Billboard Hot Latin Tracks top 40-singles "El hombre de mi vida", "Reina y cenicienta", "Prohibido", and "El taconazo".

María has received numerous accolades for her contributions to music, film, and television, including a Latin Grammy Lifetime Achievement Award, three Premios TVyNovelas, two Ariel Awards (including the Golden Ariel), and a star on the Hollywood Walk of Fame.

== Life and career ==
=== 1944–1949: Early life ===
Born in 1944 in New Orleans, Louisiana, Angélica María is the daughter of American entrepreneur Arnold Hartman and theater producer Angélica de Jesús Ortiz Sandoval. Following her parents' divorce when she was five years old, María moved to Mexico City with her mother.

=== 1949–1956: Golden Age of Mexican Cinema ===
Her mother's sister, Yolanda Ortiz, introduced little Angélica to the Mexican Cinema when Gregorio Wallerstein, a movie producer, was looking for a boy for his next movie. Angélica told the producer, "Give me a haircut and I'm that boy". Charmed by the girl, he let her into his audition. She got the role in the movie Pecado ("Sin"). Soon afterwards, she worked on Una Mujer Decente ("A Decent Woman"), La Hija de la Otra ("The Daughter of the Mistress"), Los Amantes ("The Lovers"), Fierecilla (Little Beast), and Sígueme, Corazón ("Follow Me, Sweetheart"). She obtained the Ariel award for her role in Mi Esposa y la Otra ("My Wife and the Mistress") when she was 6. She also performed in her first fotonovela Rayito del Sol ("Little Ray of Sunshine"). She sang in her two next movies, 2 Caras Tiene el Destino ("Destiny Has Two Faces") and Los Gavilanes (The Hawks) with superstar Pedro Infante, who told her she would be a great actress, because she spoke with her eyes, as he did.

In 1955, Rita Macedo offered her a role in the play La mala semilla (The Bad Seed), which would be the first of a series of plays she was involved with while she filmed.

=== 1956–2006: Acting consecration and musical foray ===
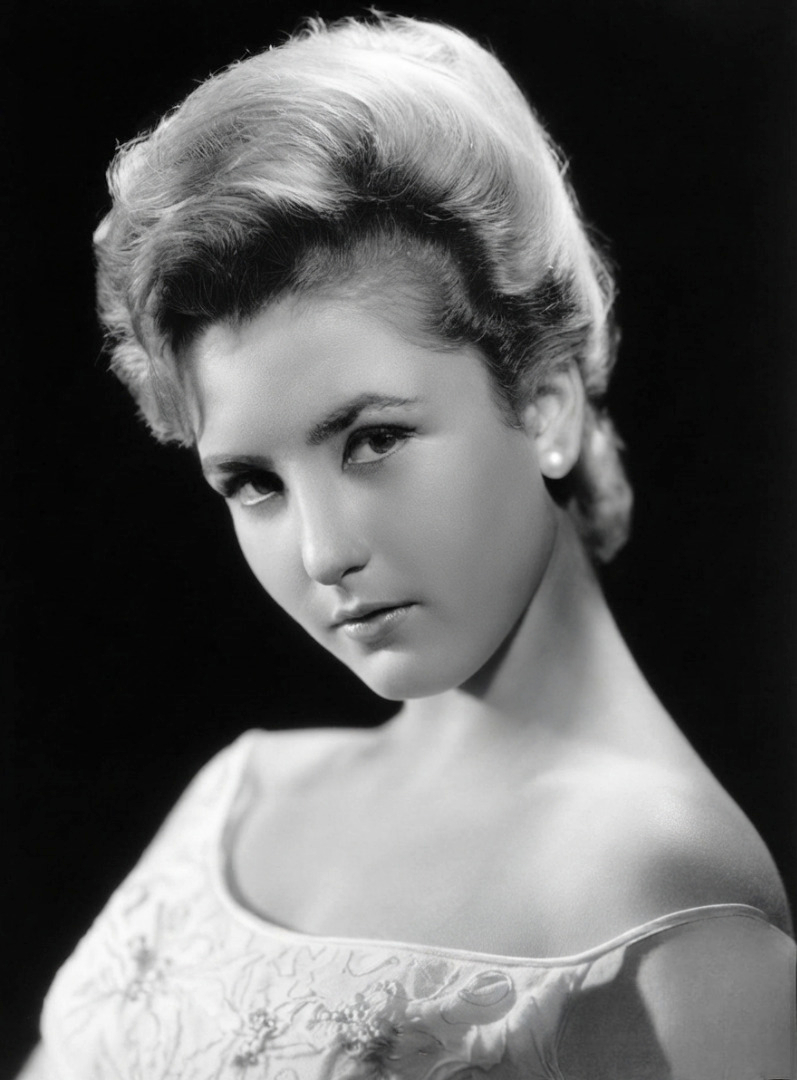
Angélica María in the 1960s

When she was 16 she joined the telenovela industry with the production Cartas de amor (Love Letters). The following year, she acted in musicals as well as in "lucha libre" films such as El Señor Tormenta (Lord Storm) and Muerte en el ring (Death in the Ring). At that time she was beginning to be referred to as La novia de la juventud (Youth's girlfriend) and after her first musical, a journalist, Octavio de Alba, named her La Novia de México (Mexico's girlfriend or Mexico's sweetheart), which is the title she would keep thereafter.

In 1965, she filmed "Fray Torero" (Friar Bullfighter) in Spain and came back to Mexico to work in two movies, and to record her sixth album. Then, she acted in such successful films as 5 de chocolate y 1 de fresa (Five of chocolate and one of strawberry) and obtained the starring role in the 1968 film version of Corazón salvaje.

Following her musical appearances, she asked for her mother's assistance (who was also her manager) and together with Armando Manzanero, then a new songwriter, she sang 1962's Eddy Eddy which would eventually become one of her greatest musical successes. Manzanero took Angélica to see a producer, and in the same year she released her first album on the Musart record label. The album was a success, so she began touring and making movies with teen idols such as César Costa and actor/singer Enrique Guzmán whom she would date later. After joining RCA, she would later become one of the biggest stars in Latin America. With Chucho Ferrer in the roles of musical director and arranger, Angélica María covered the Barbara Ruskin song, "Gentlemen Please" which was released on RCA as "Los años locos".

In 1971, she acted in Ernesto Alonso's telenovela Muchacha italiana viene a casarse ("Italian girl comes to get married") which opened the Spanish television market in the United States, and was a success in Central America and South America. She also filmed one of her biggest telenovelas Ana del aire ("Ana of the air", playing a flight attendant role). In 1973 she met the aspiring singer Juan Gabriel who would become one of the biggest selling artists in the world. Together, they would record ballads performed by mariachi bands. The single Tú sigues siendo el mismo ("You are still the same one") sold one million copies in the United States alone, and has since then been performed by dozens of other singers. She recorded three more albums in 1974. In 1977, she made the telenovela version of her film Corazón salvaje, released two albums, and performed in the play Papacito Piernas Largas ("Daddy Long-legs"), a play that would spun off an album, and broke the record of more than 1000 performances sold out in the next 3 years.

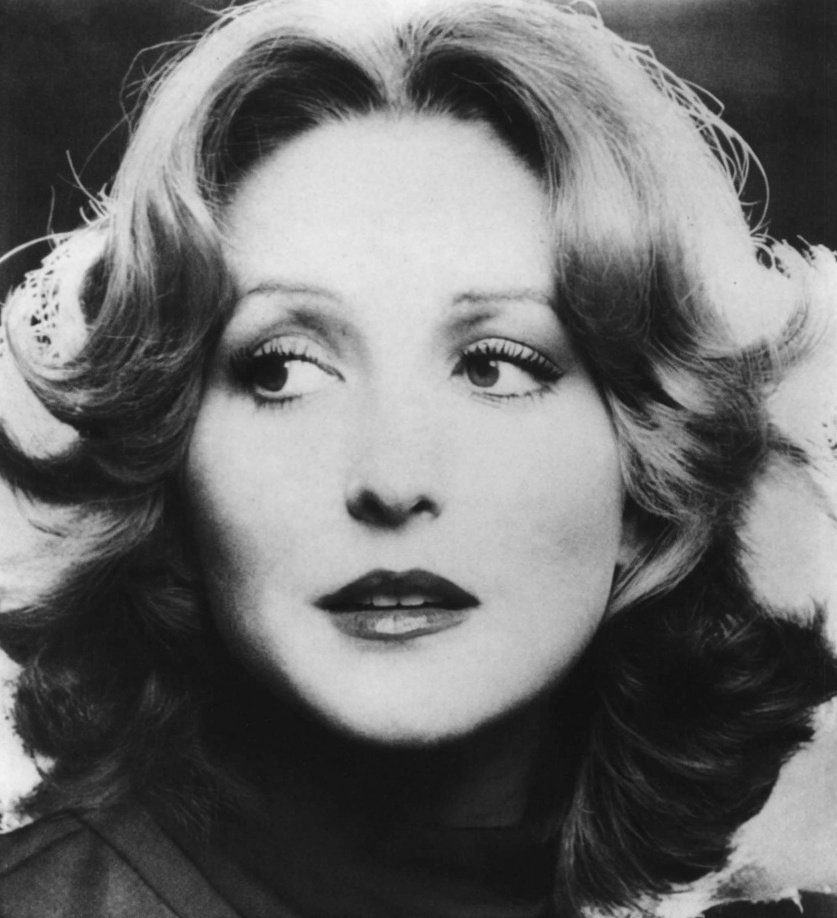
Angélica María in the 1980s

In 1980, she recorded for the first time in a U. K. studio, making an album of ballads and a single record with two pop songs in English, seeking some kind of crossover. During these years, she signed with Marsal Productions, then Caytronics, Melody, RCA again, and finally CBS, which was her last contract with a foreign record company. Since then, she established her own recording company with which she has produced 7 albums. In 1986, she starred in Herencia Maldita ("Cursed inheritance") singing the theme-song and releasing an album called "El Hombre de Mi Vida". She later acted with her daughter in a production by Angélica Ortíz titled Una Estrella. In 1988 she divorced Vale and starred in a TV show titled Tres generaciones ("Three generations") with Carmen Montejo and Sasha Sokol.

In 1990 she acted in the play Mamá ama el rock ("Mom loves rock") with her daughter and Ricky Martin. In 1994, she acted in Luis de Llano's Agujetas de color de rosa which would be such a great success that it was extended to 600 episodes. In 1995 she acted in telenovela, La Antorcha Encendida, sharing credits with Leticia Calderon, Juan Ferrara, Ofelia Guilmáin etc. and in 1996 she was offered a leading role in telenovela Bendita Mentira. In 1999 she made a special guest appearance as a mother of Thalia in telenovela Rosalinda, promoting her new album of boleros. The same year Angélica impressed the audience in the theater play La mama nos quita los novios, sharing credits with Julio Alemán.

In 2003 she joined the cast of Sea of dreams sharing credits with Sonia Braga. In 2004 she took part in Amar otra vez, produced by Lucero Suárez, which began broadcasting in January in the U.S. and in México in May 2004.

=== 2006–present: projects and later life ===
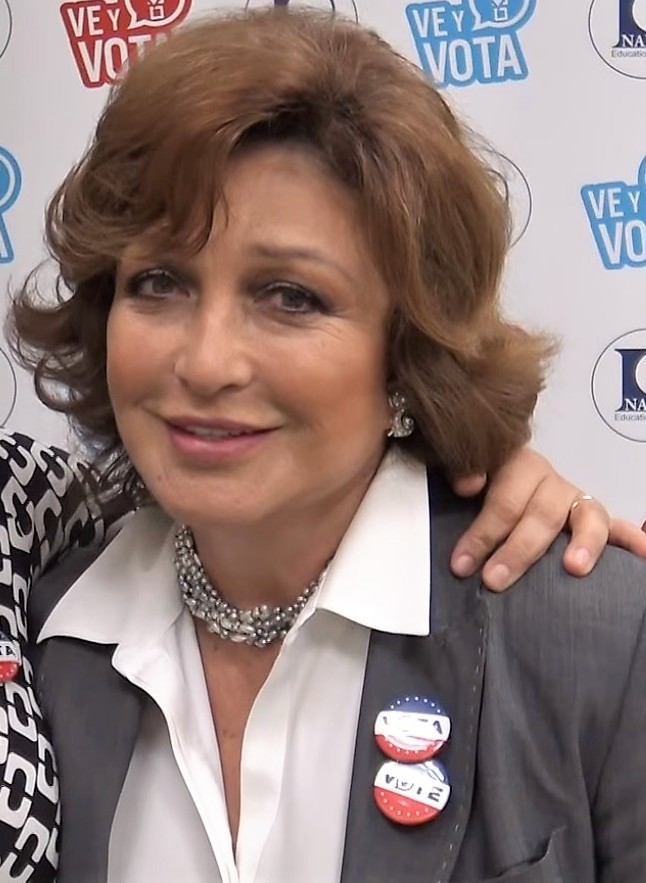
María in 2016

María participated in Telemundo's telenovelas, appearing in Aurora (2011), Mi corazón insiste en Lola Volcán (2011), and La casa de al lado (2011–2012). She later played the role of Amalia Mendoza in Televisa's telenovela Qué bonito amor (2012–2013). María served a celebrity judge in the Spanish-language version of reality singing competition El Factor X (2013–2014) on MundoFox. She has also appeared on the American television series Graves (2016) and The Lincoln Lawyer (2023).

María voiced the character of Buela Ramirez in the Disney animated television series Primos (2024–2025). In July 2026, she was announced to guest star as Ornela Donatti in Televisa's Cruzando destinos: Marruecos en el corazón, returning to telenovelas after a 14-year absence.

== Personal life ==
In 1974, she met Venezuelan singer/comedian Raúl Vale, whom she married in April 1975 in the first wedding to be televised in Mexico. That year she broke records in New York City when her show was sold out twice in the same day at the Madison Square Garden. This record has not yet been broken. In November 1975 her daughter, the international actress, comedian, singer, and impersonator Angélica Vale, was born.

In 2003 Angélica María, negotiating with a major publishing house, launched an autobiography which would release the lesser known aspects of her life as an actress and a woman. It was published by Reader's Digest in November 2005.

== Discography ==
- 1962: Angélica María
- 1962: Angélica María Vol.2
- 1963: Angélica María Vol.3
- 1964: Angélica María Vol.4
- 1965: Angélica María Vol.5
- 1965: Perdoname Mi Vida Angélica María y Alberto Vázquez (Soundtrack) (EP)
- 1966: Cantos De Navidad (single)
- 1966: La Novia De La Juventud Angélica María con Los Rebeldes del Rock
- 1966: Angélica María Vol.6
- 1967: Angélica María Vol.8
- 1967: Me Quiero Casar Angélica María y Alberto Vázquez (Soundtrack) (EP)
- 1968: Cuando Me Enamoro (album)
- 1968: Angélica Y Armando Angélica María y Armando Manzanero
- 1968: Cinco De Chocolate Y Uno De Fresa (Soundtrack) (EP)
- 1969: Somos Novios (Corazón Contento) Angélica María, Palito Ortega y Armando Manzanero (Soundtrack) (EP)
- 1969: La Paloma (Angélica María album)
- 1970: El Primer Amor
- 1971: Angélica María 1971
- 1972: El Primer Nobel Amor Angélica María y Roberto Jordán (Soundtrack) (EP)
- 1972: Angélica María 1972
- 1973: Tonto (Angélica María album)
- 1973: "Por Nosotros" Angélica María y Roberto Jordán (single)
- 1974: Voy A Escribirte Una Carta
- 1974: Yo Amo, Tu Amas, Nosotros... (EP)
- 1974: Gigi (Angélica María album) Theatre (single)
- 1974: Ana Del Aire (EP)
- 1974: ¿Donde Estas Vidita Mia?
- 1975: Una Muchacha Igual Que Todas
- 1976: Trampas Para Un Amor Angélica María y Raúl Vale (Soundtrack) (EP)
- 1976: Angélica María Con El Mariachi Mexico
- 1976: Ha Nacido Mi Niña (EP)
- 1976: Angélica María Con Mariachi
- 1977: "Papacito Piernas Largas" Theatre (single)
- 1977: Angélica María 1977
- 1979: Cuanto Habla El Corazon
- 1979: Angélica María y Raúl Vale
- 1980: Loving in the Moonlight
- 1980: Confia en Mi
- 1981: Y la sentir de Juan Gabriel
- 1983: La magia de Angelica Maria
- 1983: Sera lo que sera
- 1984: Cantar es siempre amor
- 1985: Revelaciones
- 1986: El Hombre de Mi Vida
- 1988: Una Estrella
- 1989: Pero Amanecio
- 1990: Reina y Cenicienta
- 1990: Mom loves Rock
- 1992: Revolution
- 1993: Las Grandes de Rock
- 1994: Gracias
- 1996: La viuda Alegre
- 1998: Island with babies
- 1999: Mis Exitos
- 2000: Sabor a Nada
- 2002: Bring me the Phone
- 2003: Bring me the phone... en espanol
- 2004: Boleros Reloaded
- 2006: Amor del Bueno
- 2007: Estrella mia
- 2008: Por Supuesto
- 2009: Que Emane (single)
- 2010: Ven A Mi Soledad (single)
- 2013: Con Tu Amor (Angélica María song)
- 2013: With Your Love (single)

=== International tours ===
In 1980, she recorded her 28th album and created the show La historia del cine ("The history of cinema") in which she sang, danced, and performed various characters. She changed wardrobes 15 times without leaving the stage. That same year she recorded another album with Juan Gabriel and starred in El hogar que yo robé ("The home I stole") that would be remade in the 1990s as La usurpadora. Next year she took her show in a tour throughout the Americas. In 1982, she recorded another "balada ranchera" album and obtained a role in her first English-language film Matar a un extraño ("To kill a stranger") and presented a second show La magia de Angélica María ("The magic of Angélica María") in places from New York to Chile.

In 2001, Reader's Digest released an album of her hits, and she acted in the short Qué me va a hacer.

In 2006, joined again the show "Los Grandes del Rock" making tours throughout Mexico, and reteamed with her daughter Angelica Vale for the telenovela La fea mas bella (The Prettiest Ugly Girl). The series was a ratings smash, and in 2009 they acted again as a mother and daughter in the second season of Mujeres asesinas (Murderous women) in the episode Julia, encubridora. The latter series marked Angelica Maria's second, and to date permanent, departure from Televisa, after a total of 43 years (1962–81 and 1986–2009).

In 2009, she was participating with Armando Manzanero in the show "The Women of Manzanero", touring throughout all Mexico, alongside singers such as: Tania Libertad, Ariadne, María del Sol, Rocio Banquells, Manoella Torres, Edith Márquez, Myriam, among others.

== Filmography ==
=== TV shows ===
- 1964: Premier Orfeon
- TV Musical (several seasons)
- Los Días Felices (several seasons)
- 1975: Los Grandes Años del Rock And Roll
- Exitos Bacardí (several seasons)
- 1977: Arriba El Telón
- Siempre En Domingo (yearly seasons)
- 1984–1985: Angélica María En.....
- 1986: La Hora Marcada
- 1989: Tres generaciones
- 2008–2010: Angélica María Show
- 2013–2014: El Factor X
- 2016: Graves
- 2023: The Lincoln Lawyer
- 2024–2025: Primos

=== Telenovelas ===
Year	Title	Role	Notes
1960	Cartas de amor		Protagonist
1966	Más fuerte que tu amor	Alicia	Protagonist
1968	Águeda	Águeda	Protagonist
1968	Leyendas de México		
1969	Puente de amor	Paula / Amelia	Protagonist
1971–1972	Muchacha italiana viene a casarse	Valeria Donatti	Protagonist
1973–1974	Ana del aire	Ana	Protagonist
1975–1976	El milagro de vivir	Aura Velasco	Protagonist
1977	Corazón salvaje	Mónica Molnar	Protagonist
1979	Yara	Yara	Protagonist
1981	El hogar que yo robé	Victoria/Andrea Velarde	Protagonist/Antagonist
1986–1987	Herencia maldita	Adela Beltrán	Protagonist
1994–1995	Agujetas de color de rosa	Elisa viuda de Armendáres	Co-protagonist
1996	Bendita mentira	Esperanza	Protagonist
1996	La antorcha encendida	Doña Bernarda de Muñiz	Co-protagonist
1999	Rosalinda	Soledad Martha Romero	Adult Protagonist
2003	Tu historia de amor	Esperanza/Martha	Protagonist
2004	Amar otra vez	Balbina Eslava viuda de Castañeda	Co-protagonist
2006–2007	La fea más bella	Julieta Solis de Padilla	Co-protagonist
2007	Muchachitas como tu	Herself	Special Appearance
2007	Amor sin maquillaje	Mariana	
2009	Mujeres Asesinas 2	Julia Laviada	TV series
2010–2011	Aurora	Pasion Urquijo	Supporting Role
2011	Mi Corazón Insiste	Isabel "Chabela" Volcán	Supporting Role
2011–2012	La Casa de al Lado	Cecilia Arismendi	Co-protagonist
2012–2013	Qué bonito amor	Amalia Garcia Vda. de Mendoza	Co-protagonist

=== Hollywood films ===
- 1982: To Kill a Stranger as Christina Carver
- 2003: Sea of Dreams as Rina
- 2017: Coco as Elena Rivera (Spanish dub)

=== Mexican films ===
- 1950: Pecado as Miguelito (estreno 1951)
- 1950: A Decent Woman as Hijito de Rosa (estreno 1950)
- 1950: La hija de la otra as Lupita pequeña (estreno 1951)
- 1950: Los amantes as Gloria (estreno 1951)
- 1950: The Shrew as Rosita niña (estreno 1951)
- 1951: Sígueme corazón as María Luisa (estreno 1952)
- 1951: My Wife and the Other One as Carmelita (estreno 1952)
- 1951: Dos caras tiene el destino as Rosa María (estreno 1952)
- 1951: La ausente as Rosita (1952)
- 1952: Private Secretary as Venus (1952)
- 1952: La Cobarde as Rosa María (1953)
- 1952: Sucedió en Acapulco as Niña empleada por chantajistas (1953)
- 1954: Los gavilanes as Florecita (1956)
- 1955: Sublime melodía as Clarita (1956)
- 1956: El buen ladrón as Angélica (1957)
- 1956: Música de siempre as Bailarina (estreno 1958)
- 1957: Mexican Manhunt/Flores para mi general as Rosa María
- 1959: Aventuras de la pandilla as La Cachuquis
- 1959: La pandilla en acción
- 1959: La pandilla se divierte
- 1959: Triunfa la pandilla
- 1961: Las hijas del Amapolo (1962)
- 1961: Muchachas que trabajan as Tere (1961)
- 1962: Bajo el manto de la noche as Margot (1962)
- 1962: El Señor Tormenta as Rosita (1963)
- 1962: Tormenta en el ring as Rosita (1963)
- 1962: El cielo y la tierra as Marisa (1963)
- 1962: Mi vida es una canción as Marta (1963)
- 1962: Los signos del zodiaco as Sofía (1964)
- 1963: Adorada Enemiga (1965)
- 1963: Vivir de sueños as María (1964)
- 1963: Mi alma por un amor as Marga (1964)
- 1963: La sombra de los hijos as Nora (1964)
- 1963: Napoleoncito as Rosita (1964)
- 1964: El gángster (1965)
- 1964: Mi héroe as Mané (1965)
- 1964: Perdóname mi vida as Dina (1965)
- 1965: Fray Torero (Spain, 1966)
- 1966: Sólo para tí as Elena Montero (1966)
- 1966: Me quiero casar (1967)
- 1967: 5 de chocolate y 1 de fresa as Esperanza/Brenda/Domitila (estreno 1969)
- 1967: Corazón salvaje (1968)
- 1968: Romeo contra Julieta (1968)
- 1968: Como perros y gatos (1969)
- 1968: El cuerpazo del delito (1969)
- 1968: Somos novios (1969)
- 1969: Alguien nos quiere matar as Carlota (1970)
- 1970: Ya se quién eres (te he estado observando) as Rosalba (1971)
- 1971: La verdadera vocación de Magdalena as Magdalena, "Magui"/"Irene Durán" (1972)
- 1972: Entre monjas anda El Diablo as María (1973)
- 1972: ¡Quiero vivir mi vida! as Lucía (1973)
- 1972: El Premio Nobel del amor as Leonarda Tomasa Isaaca (1973)
- 1974: Yo amo, tu amas, nosotros... (1975)
- 1977: Penthouse de la muerte (1978)
- 1978: La guerra de los pasteles (1979)
- 2002: ¿Qué me va a hacer? (cortometraje)
- 2007: Huevos revueltos (mediometraje) (2009)
- 2010: Años Despues
- 2010: Salsa Tel Aviv
- 2019: Como caído del cielo as her self

== Theatre ==
- 1955: La mala semilla
- 1960: El canto de la cigara
- 1961: Las fascinadoras
- 1965: Sí quiero
- 1966: Cuando oscurezca
- 1968: Marat/Sade as Charlotte Corday
- 1974–1975: Gigi as Colette
- 1976: Te encontre en abril
- 1976: Trampas de amor
- 1977–1979: Papacito piernas largas/Daddy Long Legs'
- 1987–1988: Una estrella
- 1990–1991: Mamá ama el rock
- 1993: La viuda alegre
- 1995: La isla de los niños
- 1996: La mujer del año/Woman of the Year as Tess Harding
- 1999: Mama nos quita los novios
- 2007: Emociones encontradas by Richard Baer ... as Cristina
- 2014: Los monologos de la vagina/ The Vagina Monologues at the Westside theatre, NYC

== Facts ==
- Angélica María is known as La Novia de México (Mexico's sweetheart).
- Although she was one of the main movie and TV attractions during 60s and 70s and the no. 1 record seller in the country during the same period, she is still one of the most respected and beloved performers in Mexico.
- For her work on stage, screen, television and as a singer, Angélica María has been inducted into the Paseo de las Luminarias at Mexico City's Plaza de las Estrellas; she and Angélica Vale are among the few mother and daughter entertainers to be honored as such.
- Angélica Maria, Raul Vale and Angélica Vale were included in the 2007 book Televisa Presenta, paying tribute to the first 50 years of the network.
- For their contributions to live performance, Angélica María and Angélica Vale have stars on the Hollywood Walk of Fame. Both stars are located at 7060 Hollywood Boulevard.

== Awards and nominations ==
=== Premios TVyNovelas ===
Year	Category	Telenovela	Result
1995	Best Lead Actress	Agujetas de color de rosa	Nominated
1997	Best First Actress	Bendita mentira	Won
2000	Best First Actress	Rosalinda	Nominated
2007	Best First Actress	La Fea Más Bella	Nominated

=== Premios Diosas de Plata ===
Year	Category	Film	Result
2012	Diosa de Plata "María Félix" Best Actress	Años después	Nominated
2012	Role Women's Draw	Luna Escondida	Nominated

=== Premios ATP (Asociación de Periodistas Teatrales) ===
Year	Category	Theater	Result
2007	Comeback of the Year	Emociones encontradas	Won

=== Premios Excelencia Musical (Academia Latina de la Grabación) ===
Year	Category	Nominee	Result
2008	Musical Excellence	Grammy Latino honorífico	Won

=== Premios People en Español ===
Year	Category	Telenovela	Result
2013	Best Supporting Actress	Qué Bonito Amor	Won
