= Ariel López Padilla =

Mexican actor

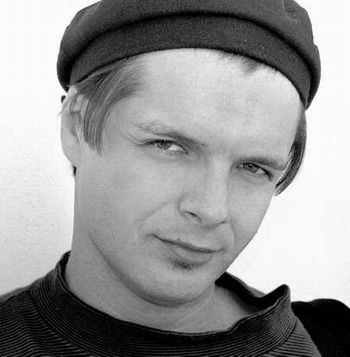
- Born: August 12, 1962 (age 63); Guadalajara, Jalisco, Mexico
- Years active: 1991–present
- Children: Maria Lopez Levy, Santiago Lopez Mancilla, Julia Lopez Mancilla
- Website: http://www.ariellopezpadilla.com

Ariel López Padilla (born 12 August 1962) is a Mexican actor. He is best known for his acting in many telenovelas such as Pobre niña rica, Gata salvaje, Pecados ajenos and Inocente de ti. Ariel Lopez works for most famous telenovelas productions principally for Telemundo and Venevision, but also has some credits in Televisa and TV Azteca. He currently lives in Miami, Florida.

When young, he showed an interest for acting. Dunia Zaldívar, his aunt and who already counted with some years as an actress, shared with him acting techniques, selected literature, examples and other guides that introduced him formally and with a lot of affection to this art.

He studied the career of performance arts at the Universidad de Guadalajara and participated in several productions where he quickly became distinguished, especially in comic papers. Later he was hired as a dancer by the Instituto Nacional de Bellas Artes (I.N.B.A.) in Mexico City. He has taken courses and workshops in Mexico, Cuba, France, Germany, United States and the former USSR, where he auditioned for the Bolshoi Ballet in the capital, Moscow.

He gave up at I.N.B.A. as a dancer to participate in the production of Cats The Musical. He enrolled to Televisa's Centro de Educación Artística. Ariel was discovered by Eugenio Cobo, CEA's Principal, allowing him to have his first sporadic but constant appearances in multiple TV shows and eventually to take his first main papers in soap operas like La Pícara Soñadora (Dir. Raquel Parot, Prod. Valentin Pimstein) y De frente al sol (Dir. Miguel Corcega, Prod. Carla Estrada).

His jump to the fame came with the soap opera Corazón salvaje, the third adaptation to the TV screen of the novel written by Caridad Bravo Adams, directed by Alberto Cortez and produced by José Rendón.

== Personal life ==
Ariel currently lives in Cuernavaca. He is married to a show business executive. He was previously married to Mariana Levy who died from a heart attack after a failed armed robbery attempt in Mexico City. With Mariana he had the opportunity to become father of a girl: María (born on March 28, 1996).

== Filmography ==
Selected works:

- Los Ricos Tambien Lloran (2022) ... Efraín Torres
- La Bandida (TV series) (2019).... Dr Avila
- Nada personal (2017) .... Ricardo Trejo
- Rosario Tijeras (2016) .... Camilio Echegaray
- Voltea pa' que te enamores (2014) .... Aurelio Botel
- Secretos de familia (2013) .... Vicente Quiroz
- Los Rey (2012) .... Guillermo Rey San Vicente "Memo"
- A Corazón Abierto (2012) ....
- Huérfanas (2011) .... Cesar Davola
- Quiéreme tonto (2010) .... Lázaro Cruz
- Pecados ajenos (2008) .... Rogelio Mercenario
- Bajo las riendas del amor (2007) .... Joaquin Corcuera
- Tierra de pasiones (2006) .... Javier Ortigoza
- Decisiones (2005) .... Libardo
- Soñar no cuesta nada (2005) .... Jonás Reyes
- Inocente de ti (2004) .... Licenciado Gómez Riveroll
- Ángel Rebelde (2004) .... Ernesto Lezama, Rómulo Lezama
- Gata Salvaje (2002) .... Patricio Rivera
- Secreto de amor (2001) .... Dr. Ricardo Sandoval
- Carita de ángel (2000) .... Adrián
- Alma rebelde (1999) .... Damian Montoro
- Soñadoras (1998) .... Enrique Bernal
- Te sigo amando (1996) .... Doctor
- Leonela (1997) .... Damián
- Pobre niña rica (1995) .... Julio
- María la del Barrio (1995) .... Dr. Daniel Ordonez
- Caminos cruzados (1994) .... César Augusto
- Prisionera de amor (1994)
- Corazón salvaje (1993) .... Andrés Alcázar y Valle
- Clarisa (1993) .... Gaston
- Televiteatros (1993)
- De frente al sol (1992)
- La Pícara Soñadora (1991)
