= 5 de chocolate y 1 de fresa =

- Poster
- Directed by: Carlos Velo
- Written by: José Agustín; Fernando Galiana
- Produced by: Angélica Ortiz
- Starring: Angélica María; Fernando Luján
- Cinematography: Rosalío Solano
- Edited by: Jorge Bustos
- Music by: Sergio Guerrero
- Release date: 26 December 1968
- Country: Mexico
- Language: Spanish

5 de chocolate y 1 de fresa ("5 Chocolate and 1 Strawberry Ice Creams") is a 1968 Mexican comedy film directed by Carlos Velo, written by Fernando Galiana, and starring Angélica María. The story involves a student at a convent who undergoes a radical transformation after consuming strange "mushrooms".

== Plot ==
Esperanza is a beautiful, gluttonous, and helpful novice in a cloistered convent. Raised there since childhood, her uneventful life takes a turn when she secretly eats some unusual mushrooms given to her by Oaxacan Indians. This transforms her into Brenda, a bold and shameless woman. Brenda crashes a party at a high-society family's home, where she meets wealthy university students Luis, Pablo, Alberto, Bernardo, and Miguel, the only one who calls her Domitila.

Led by Brenda, the group quickly becomes a gang of mischief-makers, pulling off various pranks throughout Mexico City. Their antics escalate when they decide to kidnap Salvador Montesinos, the president of the Bankers' Association. The commissioner of the International Surveillance Agency is determined to capture the "dangerous subversive" leader of the gang. Meanwhile, Miguel falls in love with Brenda and discovers her dual personality. Finally, AIV agents identify the novice and head to the convent to apprehend her.

== Cast ==
- Angélica María — Esperanza / Brenda / Domitila
- Fernando Luján — Miguel Ernesto Suárez
- Enrique Rambal — Commissioner of the International Surveillance Agency (AIV)
- Michel Strauss — Luis
- Edmundo Mendoza — Alberto
- Agustín Martínez Solares — Bernardo
- Juan Ferrara — Pablo
- Roberto Cañedo — Salvador Montesinos
- Hortensia Santoveña — Sister Remedios
- Consuelo Monteagudo — Sister Prudence
- Carlos León — AIV Agent
- Nathanael León "Frankenstein" — AIV Agent
- Víctor Alcocer — Adolfo Jiménez, the union leader
- Fernando Saucedo
- Ramiro Orcí — Assistant to Salvador Montesinos
- Colo Cora
- José Peña "Pepet" — Priest
- Francisco Reiguera — Club of Bankers' doorman
- Mario Iván Martínez
- Julián de Meriche — Poker player at the Bankers' club
- Enriqueta Reza — Nun
- Los Dug Dugs
