= Aprendiendo a vivir =

1984 Mexican telenovela

- Genre: Telenovela; Drama
- Created by: Estela Calderón
- Directed by: Rafael Banquells
- Starring: Julio Alemán; Sonia Furió; Miguel Gómez Checa; Octavio Galindo; Tina Romero; Rosa Furman
- Country of origin: Mexico
- Original language: Spanish

Production
- Executive producer: Humberto Navarro
- Production locations: Mexico City, Mexico
- Cinematography: Karlos Velázquez
- Running time: 60 minutes
- Production company: Televisa

Original release
- Network: Canal de las Estrellas
- Release: March 19 – September 21, 1984

Related
- Tú eres mi destino; Sí, mi amor

Aprendiendo a vivir (English title: Learning to live) is a Mexican telenovela produced by Humberto Navarro and directed by Rafael Banquells for Televisa in 1984. It starred Julio Alemán, Sonia Furió, Miguel Gómez Checa, Octavio Galindo and Tina Romero.

== Cast ==
- Julio Alemán as Rafael
- Sonia Furió as Gloria
- Miguel Gómez Checa as Pepe
- Octavio Galindo as Raul
- Tina Romero as Silvia
- Rosa Furman as Leonor
- Dina de Marco as Perla
- Silvia Mariscal as Martha
- Héctor Sáez as Guillermo
- Guillermo Orea as Don Jose
- Luz María Aguilar as Amada
- Carlos Monden as Juan Manuel
- Lilia Michel as Carolina
- Estela Chacón as Fedora
- Carmen Cortés as Nachita
- Antonio Ruiz as Alfredo
- Óscar Bonfiglio as Juan Manuel
- Carmen Delgado as Raquel
- Lorena Rivero as Olga
- Rafael Baledón
- Héctor Gómez as Guillermo
- Daniel Martin as Pepe
