= Raquel Olmedo =

Mexican actress and singer

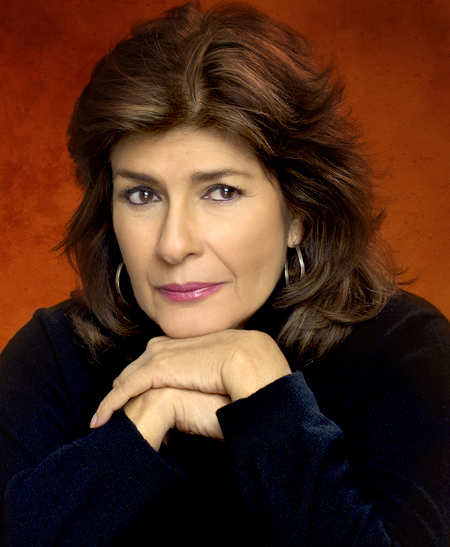

Background information
- Born: Siomara Anicia Orama Leal; 30 December 1937 (age 88); Caibarién, Las Villas, Cuba
- Genres: Pop; folk; Mariachi; world
- Occupations: Singer; actress
- Instrument: Vocals
- Years active: 1956–present
- Label: CBS (1977–1983)

Raquel Olmedo (pronounced [raˈkel olˈmeðo]; born Siomara Anicia Orama Leal on 30 December 1937) is a Cuban-born Mexican singer and actress. She started her career in her native Cuba before moving to Mexico in 1959. She performed in the last years of the Golden Age of Mexican cinema.

== Biography ==
Olmedo was born in Caibarién, Las Villas, Cuba, and began her career there in theatre singing opera. In the wake of the 1959 Cuban revolution, Olmedo came to Mexico in 1959 as an unknown artist. She did a little work in the movie business before finally landing a small role in the telenovela La sombra del otro in 1963.

Following a starring role in the 1975 telenovela Lo Imperdonable, Olmedo got a record deal with CBS Records and released her first album, Mitad Mujer, Mitad Gaviota. Her career as a singer proved initially successful, with the title track from this record (written by Lolita De La Colina) becoming a radio hit. She toured throughout all Latin America in the coming years while continuing her television and film work. In the coming years, she released a total of five albums, her last being the ranchera album Mañana Ya Ni Vengas in 1983, produced by ranchera song arranger Pedro Ramirez, best known for his work with Javier Solís and Vicente Fernández.

Her most recent role on the television series Barrera de amor proved to be one of her most successful roles. This was also one of the first times she played a villain.

For her work in television, Olmedo was inducted into the Paseo de las Luminarias in 1984.

== Albums ==
- Mitad Mujer, Mitad Gaviota (1977)
- Tu, Siempre Tu (1979)
- No Señora (1980)
- La Fuerza De Una Voz Que Impone El Cambio (1982)
- Mañana Ya Ni Vengas (1983)
- Con el Alma en Cueros (2009)

== Filmography ==
=== Film ===
Year	Title	Role	Notes
1967	Don Juan 67		
1971	Siempre hay una primera vez	Susana	Uncredited; Segment: "Isabel"
1972	Pepito y la lámpara maravillosa	Señorita Ramírez	
1974	Presagio	Isabel	
1974	Conserje para todo	Clodomira	
1974	Tráiganlos vivos o muertos		
1976	Coronación	Dora	
1978	El arracadas		
1978	La plaza de Puerto Santo	Florinda	
1979	Cuando tejen las arañas	Julia	
1979	Los indolentes	Josefa	
1979	La pistolera		
1986	Al filo de la ley: Misión rescate	Eloisa Araiza	

=== Television ===
Year	Title	Role	Notes
1963	La sombra del otro		Television debut
1967	La casa de las fieras		
1970	La cruz de Marisa Cruces	Raquel	
1972	Las gemelas	Laura	
1972	Las fieras	Edith Brisson	
1973	Cartas sin destino		
1974	La tierra	Raymunda	
1975	Lo imperdonable	Bertha Duval	
1978	Viviana	Sonia	
1978	Doménica Montero	Norma	
1979	Elisa	Elisa	
1983	El maleficio	Yuliana Pietri	
1986	Martín Garatuza	Princesa de Eboli	
1989	Lo blanco y lo negro	Soledad	
1989	Atrapada	Marcia	
1995	Bajo un mismo rostro	Cassandra Teodorakis	
1997	Esmeralda	Dominga	
1999	Amor Gitano	Manina	
2001	Atrévete a Olvidarme	La Coronela	
2002	¡Vivan los niños!	Alarica Caradura	
2004	Mujer, casos de la vida real		"La fuerza de un sueño II" (Season 21, Episode 23)
2005	Piel de otoño	Triana Gallastegui	
2005–2006	Barrera de amor	Jacinta López de Valladolid	
2008	La rosa de Guadalupe	Conchita	Episode: "Un camino difícil de andar"
2009–2010	Mar de amor	Luz Garabán	150 episodes
2010–2011	Teresa	Oriana Guijarro Moreno	
2012	Abismo de pasión	Ramona	
2014	La malquerida	Rosa	
2014	Como dice el dicho	Laura	"Nada es verdad, nada es mentira" (Season 4, Episode 7)
2015	Pasión y poder	Gisela Fuentes	
2018	Amar Sin Ley		

== Awards and nominations ==
=== TVyNovelas Awards ===
Year	Category	Telenovela	Result
1998	Best First Actress	Esmeralda	Nominated
2006	Best First Actress	Piel de otoño	Nominated
2013	Best First Actress	Abismo de pasión	Won
2013	Best Co-star Actress	Abismo de pasión	Nominated
