= Lo imperdonable (1963 TV series) =

- Genre: Telenovela
- Created by: Caridad Bravo Adams
- Starring: Silvia Derbez; Eric del Castillo
- Country of origin: Mexico
- Original language: Spanish

Original release
- Network: Telesistema Mexicano
- Release: 1963

Lo imperdonable is a Mexican telenovela produced by Televisa for Telesistema Mexicano in 1963. It only ran for one season before getting canceled

== Cast ==
- Silvia Derbez
- Eric del Castillo
- Tony Carbajal
- Pilar Sen
- Dolores Tinoco
- Miguel Suárez
- Blanca Sánchez
- Ángeñ Dupeyrón
- Carlos Ancira
- Alejandro Anderson
- León Santherí

== Related telenovelas ==
- Lo imperdonable (1985)
