= The White Horse (film) =

- Starring: Joselito, Antonio Aguilar, Sara García, Luz María Aguilar
- Release date: 1961
- Running time: 90 minute
- Country: Mexico
- Language: Spanish

The White Horse (Spanish: El caballo blanco) is a 1961 Mexican Western drama film starring Joselito, Antonio Aguilar, Sara García and Luz María Aguilar.
