= Lo imperdonable (1975 TV series) =

- Genre: Telenovela
- Created by: Caridad Bravo Adams; Fernanda Villeli
- Directed by: Alfredo Saldaña
- Starring: Amparo Rivelles; Armando Silvestre; Rogelio Guerra; Raquel Olmedo
- Theme music composer: John Williams
- Opening theme: Friends & Enemies from Eiger Sanction
- Ending theme: Amor de Paso
- Composers: John Williams, Raquel Olmedo
- Country of origin: Mexico
- Original language: Spanish
- No. of episodes: 125

Production
- Executive producer: Ernesto Alonso

Original release
- Network: Canal de las Estrellas
- Release: 1975

Related
- Paloma; Mundos opuestos; Siempre te amaré (2000)

Lo imperdonable (English: The Unforgivable), is a Mexican telenovela produced by Ernesto Alonso for Televisa in 1975. Based on an original story by Caridad Bravo Adams and Fernanda Villeli. Amparo Rivelles, Armando Silvestre and Rogelio Guerra star as the protagonists, while Raquel Olmedo and Marilú Elizaga star as the antagonists.

In the year 2000, a new adaptation of Lo imperdonable was held, under the title of Siempre te amaré.

== Cast ==
Actor	Character
Amparo Rivelles	Alejandra Fonseca / Andrea Reyna
Armando Silvestre	Mauricio Fonseca
Rogelio Guerra	Álvaro
Raquel Olmedo	Bertha Duval
Enrique Álvarez Félix	Eduardo Fonseca
Susana Dosamantes	Gloria Fonseca
Marilú Elizaga	Sofía Fonseca
Norma Lazareno	Sara Fonseca
Alfredo Leal	Arturo Rey
Miguel Manzano	Dr. Reyna
Héctor Bonilla	Ernesto
Sasha Montenegro	Sonia
Emilia Carranza	Rosalía
Gloria Mayo	Nelly Farca
Pilar Pellicer	Adriana
Susana Cabrera	Susy
Milton Rodríguez	Víctor Angellini
Sergio Barrios	Lic. Cano
Atilio Marinelli	Alberto
Carlos Flores	Héctor
Alicia Palacios	María
Lucy Tovar	Lucía
Alfonso Meza	Dr. Ricardo Luna
Alberto Inzúa	Dr. Estrada
Edith González	Gloria (girl)
Juan José Martínez Casado	Eduardo (boy)
Patricia de Morelos	Madame Collins
