= Felipa Sánchez, la soldadera =

Mexican telenovela

- Genre: Telenovela
- Country of origin: Mexico
- Original language: Spanish

Original release
- Network: Telesistema Mexicano
- Release: 1967

Felipa Sánchez, la soldadera, is a Mexican telenovela produced by Televisa and originally transmitted by Telesistema Mexicano in 1967.

== Cast ==
- Elvira Quintana as Felipa Sánchez
- Eric del Castillo
- Óscar Morelli
- María Eugenia Ríos
