= La intrusa (1964 TV series) =

- Genre: Telenovela
- Country of origin: Mexico
- Original language: Spanish

Original release
- Network: Telesistema Mexicano
- Release: 1964

Related
- Marcha nupcial (1977)

La intrusa is a Mexican telenovela produced by Televisa for Telesistema Mexicano in 1964.

== Cast ==
- José Elías Moreno
- Luz María Aguilar
- Manuel Calvo
- Julissa
