= Ada Navarrete =

Mexican opera soprano (1890–1967)

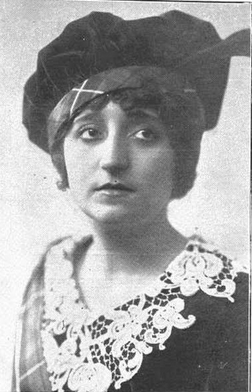
Ada Navarrete, in costume for Lucia di Lammermoor, from a 1917 publication

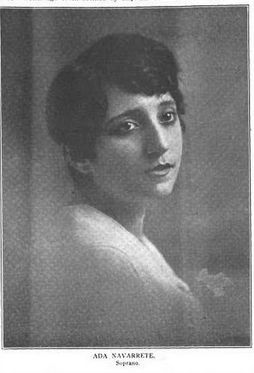
Ada Navarrete, from a 1917 publication

Ada Navarrete (Mérida, Yucatán, July 20, 1890 — Mexico City, August 13, 1967), also seen as Ada Navarrete Tappan and Ada Navarrete de Carrasco, was a soprano opera singer from Yucatán, Mexico.

== Early life ==
Ada Navarrete was from Mérida, Yucatán, the daughter of Rodolfo Navarrete Sosa (a lawyer) and Leonor Tappan Polanco. Dates of her birth vary from 1880 to 1893 in sources.

== Career ==
Navarrete, a coloratura soprano, began as a professional singer in Mexico City. She headlined her own touring company, managed by her husband. She became a member of the Boston Grand Opera in 1917, promoted along with Tamaki Miura by opera impresario Max Rabinoff, to emphasize Boston's international company. Her American debut came as Gilda in Rigoletto that year. "Navarrete's voice is rather light in the lower register," explained one critic, "but this is more than atoned for by its marked sweetness in the upper." She also sang the parts of Lucia in Lucia di Lammermoor in 1917. She had a contract with the Metropolitan Opera in New York, and sang with Enrico Caruso when he toured Mexico in 1919. She also sang in Havana and Montreal.

== Personal life ==
Ada Navarrete married Honorato Carrasco. They had six children, including two daughters who became actresses, Ada Carrasco (1912–1994) and Queta Carrasco (1913–1996). Navarrete died in 1967, in Mexico City.
