= Tú eres un extraño =

Mexican telenovela

- Genre: Telenovela
- Country of origin: Mexico
- Original language: Spanish

Original release
- Network: Telesistema Mexicano
- Release: 1965

Tú eres un extraño (English: You're a stranger) is a Mexican telenovela produced by Televisa for Telesistema Mexicano in 1965.

== Cast ==
- Luz María Aguilar
- Eric del Castillo
- Magda Donato
- Angelines Fernández
