= Eric del Castillo =

Mexican actor

- Born: J. Eduardo Eric del Castillo-Negrete Galván; 22 July 1934 (age 92); Celaya, Guanajuato, Mexico
- Occupation: Actor
- Years active: 1959–present
- Spouse(s): Roxana Billini Santamaría (1964-1967; divorced) Kate Trillo Graham (m. 1969)
- Children: 3, including Kate del Castillo

J. Eduardo Eric del Castillo-Negrete Galván (born 22 July 1934) is a Mexican actor of theater, film and television who has dabbled as a screenwriter, director and arguer film, beginning his career in the Golden Age of Mexican cinema.

== Early years and studies ==
Del Castillo was born in the Juárez Hotel of the city of Celaya, Guanajuato. Eldest son of rural teacher Aurora Galván Valenzuela (1901-1992) and Eduardo Del Castillo-Negrete Rivera (1907–1948), firefighter who lost his life in the fire of the hardware store called "La Sirena" in Mexico City.

His brothers are Federico (actor, 1936-1980) and Leopoldo. When he was young, his parents divorced and in 1945 his mother remarried. He studied in schools of the Government in San Luis Potosí, and after the death of his father in 1948, the Government offered scholarships to the children of deceased firefighters so that they could study in the school of their choice. Del Castillo was a rebellious youth, and on the instructions of his mother, in 1952 he joined the Mexican seminary for foreign missions in Mexico City and was a member of the Congregation of the missionaries of Guadalupe, priestly studies that he abandoned in 1953. Not knowing what to do with his life, Del Castillo thought about studying medicine. However, his mother encouraged him to study acting and in 1954 he joined the Film Institute, theater and broadcasting of the National Association of actors (ANDA) directed by Andrés Soler.

== Career ==
=== Theatre ===
He began his career in the early 1950s as an actor in experimental theater in separate assemblies. He has participated in more than 40 plays: Réquiem para una monja (1957), La Llorona (1959) of Fernando Wagner, Señoritas a disgusto (1962), Cada quien su vida (1968), Tócame la negra (1980), among others.

=== Television and film ===
Throughout his years in acting, Del Castillo personified frequently rough, energetic and vigorous characters. In 1959 he participated in La marca del Gavilán, film belonging to the films of the series of Aventuras del Látigo Negro. After several years of minor interventions, in 1962 he was the protagonist in Rostro infernal. From those years, his career began to consolidate and continues to the present day. He has participated in about 300 films: Tiburoneros (1962), La Generala (1970), Perro callejero (1978), Vagabunda (1993), among others.

In 1976, he made the argument of the film Víbora caliente, under the direction of Fernando Durán Rojas, as well as be part of the cast. Later, he starred in the film El extraño hijo del sheriff (1982), where he also collaborated as a writer. That same year, he directed and starred in the film Las Sobrinas del Diablo. He has acted in more than 45 soap operas since his debut in 1962 with La herencia. Its holdings include Duelo de pasiones, Alondra (1995), La Mentira (1998), Un gancho al corazón (2009). In 2010 had an award-winning participation in the melodrama of Nicandro Díaz González Soy tu dueña. He also appeared on the small screen in Abismo de pasión (2012), Lo que la vida me robó (2013–14), Que te perdone Dios (2015), and Tres veces Ana (2016).

== Filmography ==
=== Films ===
Year	Title	Role	Notes
1960	Verano violento	Carlos	
1961	Azahares rojos		
1961	Suicídate mi amor	Emilio	
1961	La maldición de Nostradamus		
1961	Viva chihuahua		
1961	Juan sin miedo	Capitán	
1962	La sangre de Nostradamus	González	
1962	Cuanto vale tu hijo		
1962	La marca del gavilán	René	
1962	El ángel exterminador		
1962	Los amigos Maravilla		
1962	El extra	Actor, Armando Duval	
1962	Los valientes no mueren		
1962	Lástima de ropa	Ingeniero Kratzer	
1962	Pecado		
1962	Tlayucan	Doroteo	
1963	Los amigos Maravilla en el mundo de la aventura		
1963	La cabeza viviente	Detective killed by Xiu	
1963	Tiburoneros	El Costeño	
1963	El señor Tormenta		
1963	Rostro infernal	Conde Brankovan	
1963	Tormenta en el ring		
1963	La huella macabra	Conde Brankovan	Uncredited
1963	Las vengadoras enmascaradas		
1976	Viento salvaje	Padre Sierra	

=== Television roles ===
Year	Title	Roles	Notes
1962	La herencia		
1963	Lo imperdonable		
1963	La sombra del otro		
1963	Grandes ilusiones		
1964	El dolor de vivir		
1965	Tú eres un extraño		
1967	Felipa Sánchez, la soldadera	López	
1968	Pueblo sin esperanza		
1968	Duelo de pasiones		
1970	La constitución		
1971	Lucía Sombra	Santiago Rangel	
1971	La maldición de la blonda		
1973	Mi rival		
1974	Mundo de juguete		
1974	La tierra	Estrada	
1977	Yo no pedi vivir	Pedro	
1979	Yara		
1979	No tienes derecho a juzgarme		
1981	Nosotras las mujeres	Manuel	
1985–2006	Mujer, casos de la vida real	Fermín	8 episodes
1987	Senda de gloria		
1987	El precio de la fama	Alfonso	
1989	Luz y sombra		
1990	Cuando llega el amor	Rafael Contreras	
1992	De frente al sol	Daniel	
1993	Más allá del puente	Daniel	
1995	María la del Barrio	Juez	
1995	Lazos de amor	Sacerdote	
1995	Lazos de amor	Sacerdote	
1995	Alondra	Baldomero	
1996	La culpa	Yllades	
1997–1998	Huracán	Fernán Vargaslugo	
1998	La mentira	Teodoro "Teo" Fernández-Negrete	
1999	Nunca te olvidaré	Licenciado Méndez	
1999–2000	Cuento de Navidad	Melquíades	
1999–2000	Mujeres engañadas	Jorge Martínez	
2001	Amigas y rivales	Don Roberto de la O	
2003	Niña amada mía	Clemente Soriano	
2004–2005	Apuesta por un amor	Chepe Estrada	
2006	La verdad oculta	Gregorio Pineda	
2006–2007	Mundo de fieras	Germán	
2007–2008	Pasión	Gaspar de Valdez	
2008–2009	Un gancho al corazón	Marcos Lerdo	Series regular; 219 episodes
2010	Soy tu dueña	Federico Montesinos	Series regular; 55 episodes
2011	Como dice el dicho	Rufino Sáenz	Episode: "Dile que es hermosa"
2012	Abismo de pasión	Lucio	Series regular; 132 episodes
2013–2014	Lo que la vida me robó	Father Anselmo	Series regular; 76 episodes
2015	Que te perdone Dios	Bruno	4 episodes
2016	Corazón que miente	Manuel	3 episodes
2016	Tres veces Ana	Evaristo	Main role; 76 episodes
2017	Mi marido tiene familia	Hugo Sr.	Series regular (season 1); 11 episodes
2017	The Day I Met El Chapo	Himself	Episode: "Destined to Meet"
2020	La Doña	Jefe Vidal	Series regular (season 2); 75 episodes
2022	Esta historia me suena	Jorge's father	Episode: "Nada fue un error"
2022	Mi secreto	Father David	Series regular
2024	Vivir de amor	Emilio Rivero Cuéllar	Series regular
2025	Amanecer	Leonardo Carranza	

== Awards and nominations ==
Year	Association	Category	Nominated	Result
1980	Ariel Awards, Mexico	Best Supporting Actor	Perro callejero	Nominated
1981	Ariel Awards, Mexico	Best Actor	Las grandes aguas	Nominated

== Personal life and family ==
He has two daughters, Veronica del Castillo and Kate del Castillo.
