= Cuna vacía =

Mexican telenovela

- Genre: Telenovela
- Starring: Cast
- Country of origin: Mexico
- Original language: Spanish

Original release
- Network: Telesistema Mexicano
- Release: 1967

Cuna vacía is a Mexican telenovela produced by Televisa and originally transmitted by Telesistema Mexicano.

== Cast ==
- Luz María Aguilar
- Miguel Córcega
- María Idalia
- Nancy Mackenzie
