= Ángel Rebelde =

Television series

- DVD cover
- Genre: Telenovela
- Written by: Alberto Gómez
- Directed by: Arquimedes Rivero
- Starring: Grettel Valdéz; Víctor Noriega; Maritza Rodríguez; Bernie Paz; Osvaldo Ríos; Alba Roversi; Claudia Islas
- Opening theme: Ángel Rebelde by Rogelio Martínez
- Ending theme: Ángel Rebelde by Rogelio Martínez
- Countries of origin: Venezuela; United States
- Original language: Spanish
- No. of episodes: 214

Production
- Producer: Alfredo Schwartz
- Production location: Venezuela
- Running time: 41-44 minutes

Original release
- Network: Venevisión
- Release: February 2 – December 6, 2004

Ángel Rebelde (in English: rebel angel) is a 2004 Miami, Florida-based telenovela produced by Fonovideo Productions which aired first on Venevisión in Venezuela. Mexican actors Grettel Valdez and Victor Noriega star as the main protagonists while Maritza Rodríguez and Ismael La Rosa star as the main antagonists. The telenovela aired on Univision from February 2 to December 6, 2004. It recently aired on Venevisión Plus in 2012.

== Plot ==
Lucia is a young girl who is in love with Raul. Raul is also in love with her. One day Lucia starts working in the mansion of Dona Enriqueta without knowing that she is working in the house of her grandmother. In the mansion she meets Natasha and Mariela, granddaughters of Dona Enriqueta. Natasha and Mariela are good, they both become friends with Lucia. However, Lucia finds out there is a third granddaughter, Cristal, whom she had a fight with in the past, over crashing into her car while Lucia worked as a bus driver. Despite trying to avoid Cristal while working in the mansion, Cristal eventually discovers her and succeeds in getting her fired.

To make things worse, when Cristal meets Raul she falls in love with him. Cristal will do anything to get Raul, even kill. On the other hand, one night Lucia and Raul have sex and Lucia becomes pregnant. But Cristal has offered Raul riches if he marries her and a better life for his child. When Lucia gives birth to "twins", she finds out that Cristal married Raul. Lucia is crushed, but she gets a chance to take revenge on Raul when her father Alejandro comes out of jail after 20 years. He was put in jail because of lies from Dona Enriqueta.

Dona Enriqueta always hated Alejandro because her daughter Elena was in love with him, so she stole everything that belonged to him and put him in jail. Alejandro pressures Lucia to get revenge on Cristal and Dona Enriqueta.

== Cast ==
- Grettell Valdez as Lucía Valderrama Covarrubias / Angela - Main female protagonist, in love with Raúl
- Victor Noriega as Raúl Hernández - Main male protagonist, in love with Lucía
- Maritza Rodríguez as Cristal Covarrubias / Amparo † - Lucía's cousin, in love with Raúl, Main villain - serial killer, responsible for the deaths of Enriqueta, Alonso, Juanita, Graciela, Dr. Villafuerte, Juan Cuchillo, Iraida, Romulo, Patricia and Ernesto, shot and killed by police.
- Bernie Paz as Dr. Claudio Salazar - in love with Lucía, finally married with Mariela
- Osvaldo Ríos as Alejandro Valderrama - Lucía's father, in love with Elena
- Alba Roversi as Elena Covarrubias Andueza - Lucía's mother, in love with Alejandro
- Claudia Islas as Doña Enriqueta Andueza de Covarrubias † - Lucía's grandmother, villain, killed by Cristal
- Lisette Morelos as Natasha Covarrubias - Lucía's cousin, Ernesto's wife, in love with Camilo
- Ariel López Padilla as Ernesto Lezama †/ Romulo † - Natasha's husband / villain, his twin brother, both killed by Cristal
- Maritza Bustamante as Mariela 'Marielita' Covarrubias - Lucía's cousin, in love with Rafael, finally married with Claudio
- Carlos Augusto Maldonado as Rafael 'Rafa' Romero - in love with Mariela, later in love with Laurita
- Norma Zúñiga as Doña Lola - Elena's friend, married with Rudenciño
- Ismael La Rosa as Leonel Anselmi † - Cristal's accomplice, villain, killed in jail
- Orlando Fundichely as Vicente Lander - in love with Lucía, later in love with Rubí
- Vivian Ruiz as Balbina Lander
- María Antonieta Duque as Rubí Morantes - Lucía's neighbour, in love with Vicente, villain, Cristal deformed her face with acid
- Juan Pablo Gamboa as Camilo Salazar - in love with Natasha
- Claudia Reyes as Iraida Ferrer † - in love with Ernesto, villain, later good, killed by Cristal
- Franklin Virguez as Alejandro 'Alejo' Espejo -. Raúl's uncle, villain, later good
- Marisol Calero as Etelvina Perez † - Alejo's wife, villain, burned alive in an effort to kill Lucia
- Adriana Acosta as Rosa 'Rosita' Rosales - in love with Raúl and later with Luigi, comic villain, later good
- Rodrigo Vidal as Luigi Spaghetti - Raul's best friend, in love with Rosita
- Jorge Luis Pila as José Armando Santibañez - in love with Lucía
- Desideria D'Caro as Patricia Villaverde Lezama † - in love with José Armando, villain, killed by Cristal who tied her up on the train rails
- Thanya Lopez as Laurita Lander Villaverde - Vicente and Patricia's daughter, in love with Rafael
- Patricio Borghetti as Juan Cuchillo † - in love with Lucía, villain, killed by Cristal with hair dryer in the bathtub
- Marcela Cardona as Graciela Santiago † - servant at the Covarrubias mansion, in love with Vicente, was raped by Leonel, killed by Cristal
- Sandra Itzel as Lisette Lezama Covarrubias - Natasha and Ernesto's young daughter
- Konstantinos Vrotsos as José 'Cheíto' Romero - Rafael's younger brother
- Alba Raquel Barros as Simona Ramirez - witch, Rubí's aunt, villain, later good
- Julio Capote as Rudenciño - married with Doña Lola
- Sabrina Olmedo as Betania - servant at the Covarrubias mansion, villain, ends up in prison
- Elizabeth Morales as Penélope Lezama Santibañez † - José Armando's wife, dies because of a chronic disease
- Hada Bejar as Tomasa
- Ricardo García as Leopoldo Serrano
- Anette Vega as Fabiana - Chela's daughter, villain, ends up in jail
- Rolando Tarajano as Marco Tulio
- Gladys Cáceres as Chela Quiñonez - Fabiana's mother, villain, ends up in jail
- Marina Vidal as Silvia
- Ilse Pappe as Haydeé
- Raúl Olivo as Alvaro

== See also ==
- List of telenovelas
- List of famous telenovelas
- List of films and television shows set in Miami
