= Cartas sin destino =

Mexican telenovela

- Genre: Telenovela
- Created by: Julio Alejandro
- Directed by: Julio Castillo
- Starring: Jacqueline Andere; José Alonso
- Country of origin: Mexico
- Original language: Spanish

Production
- Executive producer: Ernesto Alonso
- Cinematography: Alfredo Saldaña

Original release
- Network: Televisión Independiente de México
- Release: 1973

Related
- Tú eres mi destino (1984)

Cartas sin destino (English: Letters without destiny) is a Mexican telenovela produced by Ernesto Alonso for Televisión Independiente de México in 1973.

== Plot ==
Rosina and Procopia (known as "Propia") are two young sisters who have grown up in an orphanage, but the day comes that they should go out and meet the real world. They move to the capital where they get accommodation in a neighborhood. As Rosina has a talent for sewing, decides to put a sewing business at home.

== Cast ==
- Jacqueline Andere as Rosina
- Claudia Islas as Propia (Procopia)
- José Alonso as Fabian
- Ernesto Alonso as Marcelo
- Anita Blanch as Doña Prizca
- Enrique Lizalde as Javier
- Lucía Méndez
- Héctor Bonilla
- Raquel Olmedo
