= Corazón salvaje (1977 TV series) =

1977 Mexican telenovela

- Genre: Telenovela
- Written by: Caridad Bravo Adams
- Directed by: Alfredo Saldaña
- Starring: Angélica María; Martín Cortés; Susana Dosamantes
- Opening theme: "Amanecer" (Armando Manzanero)
- Country of origin: Mexico
- Original language: Spanish
- No. of episodes: 168

Production
- Producer: Ernesto Alonso
- Cinematography: Alfredo Saldaña
- Running time: 30 minutes

Original release
- Network: Televisa
- Release: 1977

Corazón salvaje is a Mexican telenovela, which was produced by and broadcast on Televisa in 1977. It is the fourth of five screen adaptations of the novel of the same name by Caridad Bravo Adams, and the second telenovela. The first telenovela starred singer Julissa while the 1977 production starred singer Angélica María who had previously had the role of Mónica in the 1968 film version. Actor Ernesto Alonso produced this version and after not casting Julissa and instead repeating Angélica María the first allegedly declared "Since my father (Luis de Llano) is not employed in this company (Televisa) anymore Ernesto Alonso has forgotten me in his castings".

== Cast ==
- Angélica María as Mónica Molnar
- Martín Cortés as Juan del Diablo
- Susana Dosamantes as Aimee Molnar
- Fernando Allende as Renato D'Autremont de la Motte et Valois
- Bertha Moss as Sofía D'Autremont de la Motte et Valois
- Miguel Manzano as Pedro Noel
- Natalia “Kiki” Herrera Calles as Catalina de Molnar
- Lucy Tovar as Janina the Sofia' s niece
- Socorro Avelar as Ana
- Jorge Vargas as Francisco D'Autremont de la Motte et Valois
- Armando Alcazar as Renato (as a child)
- Ernesto Alonso as Narrator
- Roberto Antunez as Vice-Secretary of the Governor
- Carlos Argüelles as Juan (as a child)
- Consuelo Frank as Sister María Inés de la Conception
- Manuel Guízar as Doctor Alejandro Faber
- Ernesto Marin as Colibrí
- René Muñoz as Esteban
- Agustín Sauret as Bautista the administrator
- Raúl Vale as Adrián Lefebvre
- Rosa Gloria Chagoyán as Delia Lefebvre
- Sergio Zuani as Segundo Duclos
- Ignacio Rubiel as Padre Didier 1
- Eduardo Alcaraz as Padre Didier 2
- Tony Bravo as Charles Brighton
- Roberto Montiel as Gracian de Fuente
- Felipe Ramos as Marcos de Fuente
- Pilar Souza as Kuma the witch
- Macario Alvarez as Aguillaes the boatswain of the Luzbel
- José Baviera as Monsieur Gerard de Vaudin the governor 1
- Leon Singer as Monsieur Gerard de Vaudin the governor 2
- Carmen Cortes as Sister Tornaia
- Luciano Hernandez de la Vega as Andres Bertolozzi
- Juan Diego Fernandez Viñas

== See also ==
- Corazón salvaje
