= Queta Carrasco =

Mexican actress (1913–1996)

- Born: Enriqueta Carrasco Navarrete; July 4, 1913; Mexico City, Mexico
- Died: August 8, 1996 (aged 83); Mexico City, Mexico

Queta Carrasco (July 4, 1913 — August 8, 1996) was a Mexican character actress.

== Early life ==
Enriqueta Carrasco Navarrete was born in Mexico City, the daughter of Honorato Carrasco and Ada Navarrete. Her father was an engineer and her mother was an opera singer. Her older sister Ada Carrasco also became an actress, as did Ada's daughter Malena Doria.

== Career ==
Carrasco's first role in a film came in 1962, in Ruletera a toda marcha, directed by Rafael Baledón; her sister Ada was also in that film. She was in more than forty Mexican films, mostly genre films, including La Venganza de Huracán Ramirez (1967, a "masked wrestler" film) Los Asesinos (1968), Un Quijote sin Mancha (1969), Elena y Raquel (1970), Pubertinaje (1971), El Águila Descalza (1971), Fé, Esperanza y Caridad (1973), La presidenta municipal (1975), Coyote and Bronca (1980), She also appeared in telenovelas including Gabriel y Gabriela (1982), Tú eres mi destino (1984), La indomable (1987), Ángeles blancos (1990), Vida robada (1991), Corazon salvaje (1993), and Dos mujeres, un camino (1993-1994), often playing grandmothers. She was acting to the very end of her life, with her last role in 1995 in the telenovela Alondra.

== Personal life ==
Queta Carrasco died in 1996, in Mexico City, aged 83 years.
