= Duelo de pasiones (1968 TV series) =

- Genre: Telenovela
- Country of origin: Mexico
- Original language: Spanish

Original release
- Network: Telesistema Mexicano
- Release: 1968

Duelo de pasiones, is a Mexican telenovela produced by Televisa and originally transmitted by Telesistema Mexicano.

== Cast ==
- María Elena Marqués
- Eric del Castillo
- Anita Blanch
- Silvia Fournier
