= Yolanda Ventura =

Spanish/Mexican actress and singer

- Born: Yolanda Ventura; 21 October 1968 (age 57); Barcelona, Spain
- Other name: "La ficha amarilla" ("The yellow pawn")
- Occupations: Actress, singer
- Spouses: Alejandro Aragon (div. 2010) Odiseo Bichir (m. 2017)
- Relatives: Lilia Aragon (former mother-in-law)

Yolanda Ventura (born 21 October 1968, in Barcelona, Spain) is a dual nationality Spanish/Mexican actress and was a Spanish singer when she was young. She is best known for roles in Mexican telenovelas and is a former member of the Spanish children's music band Parchís. She joined Parchís after a recording company posted an advertisement looking for kids who could sing, dance, and act. A few months later, in 1979, the band was formed and named after the Spanish version of the Pachisi board game. The band was a success in Spain and Latin America, they recorded five albums and filmed seven movies (three in Argentina).

In the mid-1980s, the band split. Yolanda moved to Mexico in the early 1990s obtaining the role of Astrid in Lucía Méndez's telenovela Amor de nadie. She then joined the cast of Muchachitas. She then played a prostitute in the Corazón salvaje.

== Theater ==
- Monólogos de la vagina, Spanish version of The Vagina Monologues

== Television ==
- Tan cerca de ti, nace el amor (2026) as Consuelo García
- Mi amor sin tiempo (2024) as Lucía
- Pienso en ti (2023) as Daniela Avendaño
- S.O.S me estoy enamorando (2021-2022) as Elsa
- Fuego ardiente (2021) as Pilar
- Mujeres de negro (2016) as Giovanna
- La sombra del pasado (2014-2015) as Irma
- Amor Bravío (2012) as Piedad
- Como dice el dicho (2011–2017)
- La que no podia amar (2011) as Gloria
- Cuando me enamoro (2010) as Karina Aguilar
- En Nombre del Amor (2008) as Angelica
- La Rosa de Guadalupe (2009-2016)
- Yo amo a Juan Querendon (2007) as Laura
- Contra viento y marea (2005) as Isabel
- Piel de otoño (2004) as Mayte
- Amy, la niña de la mochila azul (2004) as Angelica Hinojosa #2
- Bajo la misma piel (2003) as Macarena
- ¡Vivan los niños! (2002) as Dolores Herrera
- Cómplices Al Rescate (2002) as Clara Torres #2
- Atrévete a olvidarme (2001) as Liliana
- Carita de ángel (2000) as Julieta
- El diario de Daniela (1998-1999) as Natalia Navarro Monroy
- La paloma (1995)
- Corazón salvaje (1993) as Azucena
- Muchachitas (1991) as Gloria
- Amor de nadie (1990) as Astrid
- Desafio (1990)
- Platos rotos (1985) as Mariel

== Films ==
- El club de los idealistas (2020) as Elena
- Dos gallos de oro (2002)
- De qué se ríen las mujeres (1997) as Abuela
- La noche de la ira (1985)

=== With Parchís ===
- La Gran aventura de Los Parchís (1983)
- Parchís entra en acción (1983)
- Las locuras de Parchís (1982)
- La magia de Los Parchís (1982)
- La segunda guerra de los niños (1981)
- Los parchís contra el hombre invisible (1981)
- Guerra de los niños (1980)
