= Luz María Aguilar =

Mexican actress (born 1935)

- Born: Luz María Aguilar Torres; 26 March 1935 (age 90); Ojinaga, Chihuahua, Mexico
- Occupation: Actress
- Years active: 1954-present
- Children: Alejandro

Luz María Aguilar Torres (born 26 March 1935) is a Mexican actress from the Golden Age of Mexican cinema. Aguilar as worked as an actress in theatre, cinema and television. One of her main roles was in the series Hogar, dulce hogar for more than eight years.

== Filmography ==
- El secuestro del símbolo sexual (1995)
- Supervivientes de los Andes (1976)
- Las fuerzas vivas (1975)
- Laberinto de pasiones (1975)
- Al fin a solas (1969)
- Dr. Satán y la magia negra (1968)
- Cómo pescar marido (1967)
- Dos meseros majaderos (1966)
- Pistoleros del oeste (1965)
- La maldición de mi raza (1965)
- El mundo de las drogas (1964)
- El norteño (1963)
- Estos años violentos (1962)
- Las recién casadas (1962)
- El caballo blanco (1962)
- La furia del ring (1961)
- Las cosas prohibidas (1961)
- Matrimonios juveniles (1961)
- Mujeres engañadas (1961)
- Ojos tapatios (1961)
- La diligencia de la muerte (1961)
- La llorona (1960)
- ¡Qué bonito amor! (1960)
- Mundo, demonio y carne (1960)
- El último mexicano (1960)
- Vivir del cuento (1960) (as Luz Ma. Aguilar)
- Manicomio(1959) .... Beatriz; Laura, paciente
- Siete pecados (1959) (as Luz Ma. Aguilar)
- Pistolas de oro (1959)
- El águila negra contra los enmascarados de la muerte (1958)
- Mujeres encantadoras (1958)
- El águila negra en la ley de los fuertes (1958)
- Vainilla, bronce y morir (Una mujer más) (1957)
- Juventud desenfrenada (1956) .... Rosa Lara
- Caras nuevas (1956)
- Con quién andan nuestras hijas (1956)
- Soy un golfo (1955)
- The Seven Girls (1955)
- Maldita ciudad (1954))

== Television ==
- Amor amargo (2024)
- Más vale sola (2024)
- Tierra de esperanza (2023)
- Vecinos (2023)
- Te doy la vida (2020)
- Amores con trampa (2015)
- Como dice el dicho (2012–13)
- Ni contigo ni sin ti (2011)
- Mujeres asesinas 3 (2010)
- Alma de hierro (2008–2009)
- La fea más bella (2006–2007)
- Rubí (2004)
- Clap...El lugar de tus sueños (2003)
- Navidad sin fin (2001)
- Mujer, casos de la vida real
- Cuento de navidad (1999)
- El niño que vino del mar (1999)
- Vivo por Elena (1998)
- Una luz en el camino (1998)
- Los papás de mis papás (1994)
- Corazón salvaje (1993)
- Aprendiendo a vivir (1984)
- Vamos juntos (1979)
- Hogar, dulce hogar (1974)
- Amaras a tu projimo (1973)
- El profesor particular (1971)
- Cosa juzgada (1970)
- Concierto de almas (1969)
- Cárcel de mujeres (1968)
- La duda (1967)
- Cuna vacía (1967)
- El ídolo (1966)
- Tú eres un extraño (1965)
- La intrusa (1964)
- La sombra del otro (1963)
- El Enemigo (1961)
- María Guadalupe (1960)
