= Joana Brito =

Mexican actress (1947–2023)

- Born: Joana Brito Vitelli; 25 April 1947; Delicias, Chihuahua, Mexico
- Died: 27 June 2023 (aged 76); Monterrey, Nuevo León, Mexico
- Occupation: Actress
- Years active: 1960s–2017

Joana Brito Vitelli, known professionally as Joana Brito, (25 April 1947 – 27 June 2023) was a Mexican actress whose professional career spanned more than fifty years. She was known for a long career at Televisa, starring in the company's telenovelas and other television series, including Mujer, Casos de la Vida Real ,Cómplices Al Rescate"Teresa". Brito was also an accomplished voiceover and dubbing artist, becoming one of Mexico's most requested voice actresses since she began work in the voiceover industry in the 1980s. Her highest profile credits included the voice of Yubaba in Studio Ghibli's Spirited Away (El Viaje de Chihiro) and Mama Odi in the Spanish-language, Mexican release of Walt Disney Pictures' The Princess and the Frog.

== Biography ==
Brito was born Joana Brito Vitelli in Chihuahua City on 25 April 1947. She graduated from the Instituto Nacional de Bellas Artes y Literatura in Mexico City with a degree in theater and stage direction. She began her career as a theater and stage actress in the 1960s.

Brito spent much of her career at Televisa, where she appeared in multiple telenovelas and series. She made her television debut on the 1985 Televisa telenovela, Juana Iris, playing the character, Toña. Her other series at Televisa, which spanned decades included Cuna de lobos in the 1980s, Mujer, Casos de la Vida Real, Pueblo chico, infierno grande (1997), Cómplices Al Rescate (2002), Duelo de Pasiones, La rosa de Guadalupe, Corazón salvaje, Teresa, and La fuerza del destino.

In the 1980s, Joana Brito began voiceover and dubbing work for foreign films and cartoons for the Mexican markets, becoming one of the industry's most requested dubbing artists. For Walt Disney Studios, Brito provided Spanish language voices of Zira in The Lion King II: Simba's Pride, the villain, Morgana, in The Little Mermaid II: Return to the Sea, Mama Odi in The Princess and the Frog, and Miss Muriel P. Finster in the Disney animated television series, Recess. Outside of Disney, she also provided the voices of Koharu Utatane in the anime series Naruto and Kaiô-sama in Dragon Ball Z.

Brito also performed live action dubbing for international films released in Mexico and Latin America. She provided the Spanish-language speaking voice of British actress Judi Dench in several films, including The Last of the Blonde Bombshells (2000), The Second Best Exotic Marigold Hotel (2015), as well as the voice of American actress Margo Martindale in Win Win (2011) and The Boss (2016). Brito also provided dubbing for Charlotte's Web (2006), Marie Antoinette (2006), Hairspray (2007), Hugo (2011), The Odd Life of Timothy Green (2012), Percy Jackson: Sea of Monsters (2013), and Deadpool (2016). Brito's voice has been compared to Argentinian actress Ruby Gattari and Cuban actress Carmen Donna-Dío, so she was often cast in similar dubbing roles.

Brito did not appear in films until the 1990s, making her film debut in El anzuelo in 1996. Her film roles included the 1997 drama Santo Luzbel, Cicatrices in 2005, the American romantic comedy From Prada to Nada in 2011, and the Mexican animated film, El gran milagro, also in 2011.

She retired from acting in 2016 due to declining health and moved to Monterrey, Nuevo León. However, she made a guest appearance on the Mexican telenovela, El Bienamado, marking her final role on television.

Brito, who had been hospitalized since November 2022, died from kidney failure in Monterrey on 27 June 2023, at the age of 76. Her death was announced by the National Association of Actors (ANDA).
