= Claudia Islas =

Mexican actress (born 1946)

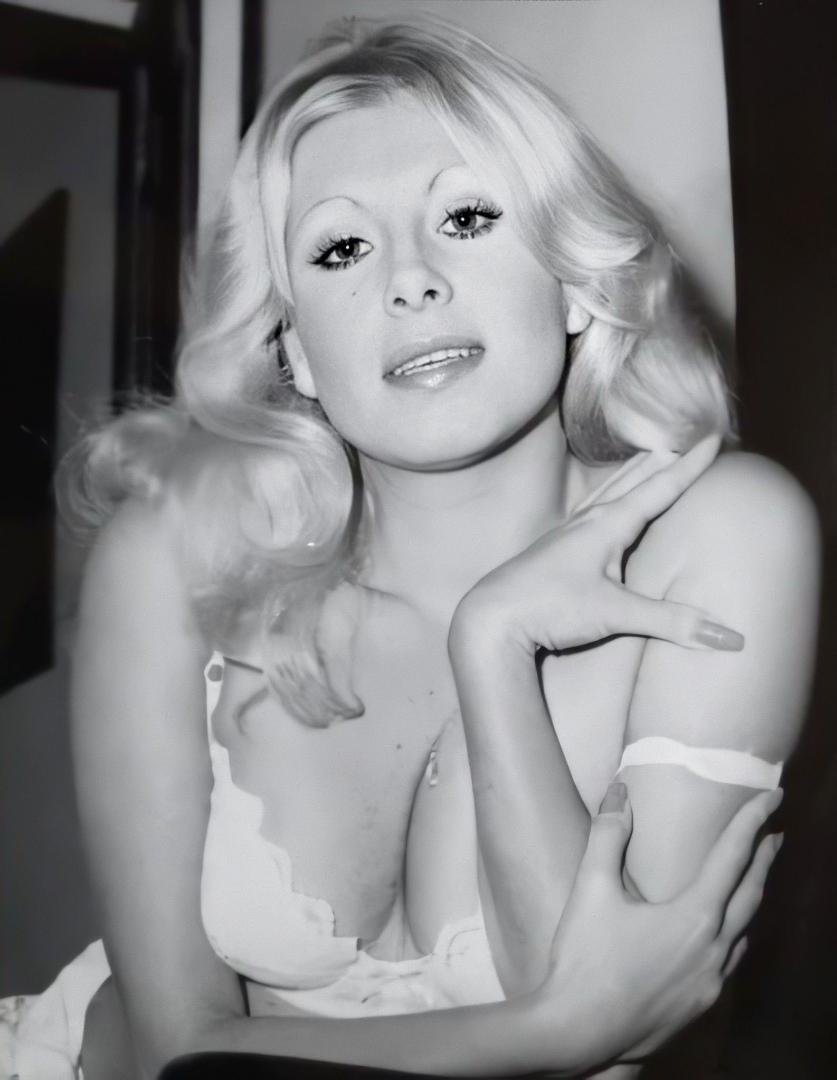
- Claudia Islas in 1971
- Born: Elizabeth Islas Brasdefer; July 17, 1946 (age 80); Pachuca, Hidalgo, Mexico
- Occupation: Actress
- Years active: 1959-2004
- Spouse: Jaime Bravo

Elizabeth Islas Brasdefer (born July 17, 1946 in Pachuca de Soto, Hidalgo, Mexico) is a Mexican telenovela actress who is better known as Claudia Islas (Spanish pronunciation: [ˈklawðja ˈislas]). She is very famous for her beauty and was called "Mexican Brigitte Bardot" in the past.

== Biography ==
Claudiaʻs surname Islas means "islands". She is a daughter of Luis Roberto Islas and María Luisa Brasdefer. She is married to Jaime Bravo.

One of her best known roles was that of Amparo de Garcés del Valle in Marisol with Erika Buenfil, who played her niece-in-law, Marisol.

As of 2012 she lives in Miami and is retired. Her last work was in the telenovela Ángel Rebelde in 2004.

She sold her jewelry because she fell into poverty.

== Controversies ==
After the death of Juan Gabriel in 2016, the actress Carmen Salinas revealed that he confessed to her son Pedro Plascencia Salinas—who was Gabriel’s pianist for over twenty years—that Claudia Islas was the person who accused him of theft after a party at her house in 1969. These charges caused Juan Gabriel to be imprisoned for 18 months in the Lecumberri Palace. Juan Gabriel himself never publicly revealed the name of the person who had accused him. Islas denied the accusations.

== Filmography ==
Year	Title	Character	Note
1970	La cruz de Marisa Cruces	Violeta	Main Antagonist
1973	Cartas sin destino	Lucía	Protagonist
1974	La tierra	Procopia (Propia)	Protagonist
1975	Más Negro que la Noche	Ofelia	Protagonist
1977	Pacto de amor	Delia	Protagonist
1979	Amor prohibido	Magda	Protagonist/Main Antagonist
1984	Tú eres mi destino	Rebeca de Dávila	Protagonist/Main Antagonist
1988	Pasión y poder	Nina Montenegro	Main Antagonist
1992	Baila conmigo	Nelly Moll	Antagonist
1993	Corazón salvaje	Sofía Molina Vda. de Alcázar y Valle	Main Antagonist
1996	Marisol	Amparo de Garcés del Valle	Main Antagonist
1997	El alma no tiene color	Begoña Roldán	Antagonist
1999	Catalina y Sebastián	Adela Rivadeneira de Negrete	Main Antagonist
2002	Por ti	Virginia Montalbán	Antagonist
2004	Ángel Rebelde	Doña Enriqueta Andueza Vda. de Covarrubias	Antagonist
