= Cartas de amor (TV series) =

- Genre: Telenovela; Drama
- Starring: Angélica María; Ernesto Alonso; Sergio Bustamante
- Country of origin: Mexico
- Original language: Spanish

Production
- Executive producer: Ernesto Alonso
- Production locations: Mexico City, Mexico
- Running time: 42-45 minutes
- Production company: Televisa

Original release
- Network: Canal 4, Telesistema Mexicano
- Release: 1960 – 1960

Cartas de amor is a Mexican telenovela that aired on Canal 4, Telesistema Mexicano in 1960. It was produced by Ernesto Alonso and starred Angélica María and Ernesto Alonso.

== Cast ==
- Ernesto Alonso
- Angélica María
- Sergio Bustamante

== Production ==
- Original Story: Julio Alejandro
- Adaptation: Julio Alejandro
- Managing Director: Fernando Wagner
- Production: Ernesto Alonso
