= Corazón salvaje (1956 film) =

1956 film by Juan José Ortega

- Directed by: Juan José Ortega
- Written by: Caridad Bravo Adams (original); Juan José Ortega (adaptation)
- Produced by: Juan José Ortega
- Starring: Martha Roth; Christiane Martel; Carlos Navarro; Rafael Bertrand
- Cinematography: Rosalío Solano
- Edited by: José W. Bustos
- Music by: Gustavo César Carrión
- Release date: 7 June 1956 (Mexico)
- Running time: 78 minutes
- Language: Spanish

Corazón salvaje is a 1956 Mexican drama film directed by Juan José Ortega and starring Martha Roth, Christiane Martel, Carlos Navarro and Rafael Bertrand.

It was the first screen adaptation of the novel of the same name by Caridad Bravo Adams published in 1957, a year after the film adaptation was released. The first adaptation was made as a radionovela.

== Cast ==
- Martha Roth as Mónica Molnar
- Christiane Martel as Aimée Molnar
- Carlos Navarro as Juan del Diablo
- Rafael Bertrand as Renato Duchamp
- Dalia Íñiguez
- Julio Villarreal
- Fedora Capdevila
- Víctor Alcocer
- Armando Velasco
