= Arsenio Campos =

Mexican actor (1946–2025)

- Born: January 26, 1946; Tijuana, Baja California, Mexico
- Died: April 1, 2025 (aged 79); Saltillo, Coahuila, Mexico
- Occupation: Actor
- Years active: 1970–2025
- Known for: Como dice el dicho La Rosa de Guadalupe
- Spouse: María Teresa Santoscoy
- Children: 2

Arsenio Campos (January 26, 1946 – April 1, 2025) was a Mexican actor whose career spanned over five decades, encompassing television, film and theater.

== Life and career ==
Born in Tijuana, Baja California, Arsenio Campos began his acting career in the early 1970s with the film Para servirle a usted. His first appearance in a telenovela came in 1973 with La hiena. Over the years, he became a prolific figure in Mexican television, participating in more than 30 telenovelas, including notable productions such as Bodas de odio, El Camino Secreto, Mi segunda madre, Corazón salvaje, Ángela, El noveno mandamiento, and Apuesta por un amor. Campos was recognized for his versatility, portraying a wide variety of characters, from virtuous protagonists to complex antagonists.

In addition to his work in telenovelas, Campos appeared in numerous films and television series, expanding his repertoire and showcasing his talent in diverse genres. Among his television credits are appearances in popular series such as Como dice el dicho and La rosa de Guadalupe.

Campos married María Teresa Santoscoy, a native of Piedras Negras, Coahuila. The couple had two children, Arsenio and Alexandra. Alexandra has expressed an interest in pursuing a career in acting, following in her father's footsteps.

Arsenio died in Saltillo, Coahuila, Mexico on April 1, 2025, at the age of 79.

== Filmography ==
=== Soap operas ===
- Golpe de suerte (telenovela) (2023) ... Sacerdote
- Por amar sin ley (2018) ... Gilberto
- Mi marido tiene familia (2017)... Doctor Lisboa
- Tres veces Ana (2016) ... Sandro Escárcega
- Simplemente María (2015–2016) .... Eugenio Ceniceros
- Hasta el fin del mundo (2014–2015) .... Artemio Blanco
- Amores verdaderos (2012–2013) .... Felipe Guzmán
- Por ella soy Eva (2012) .... Padre de Santiago
- Soy tu dueña (2010) .... Padre Justino Samaniego #2
- Camaleones (2009–2010) .... Teo Santoscoy
- Al diablo con los guapos (2007–2008) .... Peralta
- Amar sin límites (2006–2007) .... Leandro Burgay
- Apuesta por un amor (2004–2005) .... Ignacio Andrade ⸸
- Amar otra vez (2004) .... Javier
- Corazones al límite (2004)
- Así son ellas (2002–2003) .... Mariano Madrigal
- Navidad sin fin (2001) .... Carmelo
- Amigas y rivales (2001) .... Padre Tomás
- Atrévete an olvidarme (2001) .... Patricio
- El noveno mandamiento (2001) .... Ramiro González
- Cuento de Navidad (1999–2000) .... Mateo
- DKDA Sueños de juventud (1999–2000) .... Felipe
- Infierno en el paraíso (1999) .... Santiago
- Ángela (1998–1999) .... Óscar Lizárraga
- Sentimientos ajenos (1996) .... Joaquín
- Confidente de secundaria (1996) .... Jorge ⸸ Villano
- La paloma (1995) .... Luis Alarcón
- Bajo un mismo rostro (1995)
- Corazón salvaje (1993–1994) .... Alberto de la Serna
- Entre la vida y la muerte (1993) .... Francisco del Valle
- Amor de nadie (1990–1991) .... Jesús
- Balada por un amor (1989–1990) .... Rafael Allende
- Mi segunda madre (1989) .... Felipe
- El rincón de los prodigios (1987–1988)
- El camino secreto (1986) .... Roberto Zárate
- De pura sangre (1985–1986) .... Diego Bustamante
- Tú o nadie (1985) .... Claudio
- El maleficio (1983–1984) .... Álvaro
- Bodas de odio (1983–1984) .... Sebastián de la Cruz y Cañizares Villano
- Mundos opuestos (1976–1977) .... Álvaro
- La tierra (1974–1975) .... Carlos
- La hiena (1973) .... Roberto
- Mi primer amor (1973)

=== TV series ===
- Como dice el dicho (2011)
- Hermanos y detectives (2009)
- Mujeres asesinas (2009) .... Mario (episodio: "Cecilia, prohibida")
- La rosa de Guadalupe (2008)
- "Cosas insignificantes" - Marcos
- "Diana" - Mario
- "El amigo de los árboles"
- "Rincón de amor" - Don Genaro
- "La sombra de la venganza"
- Mujer, casos de la vida real (2002–2006)
- Diseñador ambos sexos (2001) .... Hostess (Capítulo 17: Trabajando como abejita)
- ¿Qué nos pasa? (1998)
- Destinos (1992) .... Carlos

=== Movies ===
- Animales en peligro (2004)
- Carreras parejeras (2002)
- Los muertos no hablan (2000)
- Reclusorio III (1999)
- El recomendado (1999)
- El mensajero del miedo (1999)
- La fiesta de los perrones (1999)
- Pesadilla infernal (1997)
- Fuera de serie (1997)
- Amor que mata (1994)
- Muerte en altamar (1994)
- Hombres de acero (1993)
- La fichera más rápida del oeste (1992)
- Venganza (1992)
- La insaciable (1992)
- Con ganas de morir (1992)
- La huella (1991)
- Infamia (1991)
- El intruso (1991)
- El descuartizador (1991)
- La leona (1991)
- La taquera picante (1990)
- Muerto al hoyo... y al vivo también (1990)
- Cita con la muerte (1989)
- Con el odio en la piel (1988)
- La noche de la bestia (1988)
- Durazo, la verdadera historia (1988)
- La pandilla infernal (1987)
- Persecución en Las Vegas: Volveré (1987)
- Herencia de sangre (1987)
- Mentiras (1986)
- Esos viejos rabo verde (1983)
- Allá en el rancho de las flores (1983)
- Pistoleros famosos III (1983)
- Valentín Lazaña (1982)
- Las siete cucas (1981)
- Picardía mexicana - número dos (1980)
- Bloody Marlene (1979)
- Discotec fin de semana (1979)
- La hija del contrabando (1979)
- Ratas del asfalto (1978)
- Mil caminos tiene la muerte (1977)
- Vacaciones misteriosas (1977)
- Las cenizas del diputado (1977)
- Los albañiles (1976)
- Alas doradas (1976)
- El albañil (1975)
- Cristo te ama (1975)
- El secuestro (1974)
- La muerte de Pancho Villa (1974)
- Los doce malditos (1974)
- El primer amor (1974)
- El juego de la guitarra (1973)
- Los cachorros (1973)
- Los enamorados (1972)
- Victoria (1972)
- Tacos al carbón (1972)
- Yo, tú, nosotros (1972)
- Intimidades de una secretaria (1971)
- Las puertas del paraíso (1971)
- Sin salida (1971)
- Ya sé quien eres (te he estado observando) (1971)
- Para servir a usted (1971)
