= Enrique Lizalde =

Mexican actor (1937–2013)

- Born: Enrique Lizalde Chávez; January 9, 1937; Mexico City, Mexico
- Died: 3 June 2013 (aged 76); Mexico City, Mexico
- Relatives: Eduardo Lizalde (brother); Óscar Chávez (cousin)

Enrique Lizalde Chávez (January 9, 1937 – June 3, 2013) was a Mexican film, television and theater actor whose career spanned from the 1960s to the 2000s. He appeared in dozens of films and television shows, including telenovelas, throughout his career.

Lizalde began his career in the early 1960s. His film roles included Corona de lágrimas in 1968 and El Monasterio de los Buitres in 1973. Lizalde's numerous telenovela credits included Chispita, Dulce desafío, María la del Barrio, Alcanzar una estrella, Esmeralda (Mexican TV series), and La usurpadora.

He was the first actor to portray Juan del Diablo on the original 1966 Mexican telenovela, Corazón salvaje. He was later cast as Noel Mancera in the 1993 remake of Corazón salvaje. His last telenovela series were Amor sin maquillaje in 2007 and Mañana es para siempre in 2009.

Lizalde died on Monday, June 3, 2013, at his home in Mexico City, aged 76.

== Filmography ==
=== Films ===
- He Matado a un Hombre (1964) – Carlos
- Black Wind (1965) – Jorge Iglesias
- Nosotros los Jovenes (1966) – Julio Jr.
- Estratregia Matrimonio (1966) – Raul
- Corona de lágrimas (1968) – Fernando Chavero
- El Monasterio de los Buitres (1973)

=== Telenovelas ===
- La mentira (1965 TV series) – Demetrio
- Corazón salvaje (1966 TV series) (1966) – Juan del Diablo
- Barata de primavera (1975–1976) – Eduardo Lozano
- Chispita (1982–1983) – Alejandro de la Mora
- Dulce desafío
- Corazón salvaje (1993 telenovela) – Noel Mancera
- María la del Barrio
- Alcanzar una estrella
- Esmeralda (Mexican TV series)
- La Usurpadora – Alessandro Farina (1998)
- Entre el amor y el odio – Rogelio Valencia (2002)
- Amor sin maquillaje (2007) – Himself
- Mañana es para siempre (2008–2009) – Lic. Manuel Ramos
- Porque el amor manda (2012–2013) – Sebastián Montemayor
