= Caridad Bravo Adams =

Mexican journalist

- Born: January 14, 1908; Villahermosa, Tabasco, Mexico
- Died: August 13, 1990 (aged 82); Mexico City, Mexico
- Relatives: Leon Bravo (brother)
- Writing career
- Pen name: Caridad Bravo Adams
- Language: Spanish
- Period: 1924–1990
- Genre: telenovela

Caridad Bravo Adams (Spanish pronunciation: [kaɾiˈðað ˈβɾaβo ˈaðams]; born on January 14, 1908, in Villahermosa, Tabasco – August 13, 1990 in Mexico City) was a prolific Mexican writer and the most famous telenovela writer worldwide.

Her parents were Cuban actors and she was part of an extended family of artists, being the sister of Venezuelan actor Leon Bravo, one of the pioneers of theater, radio and TV in Venezuela. She published her first book at the age of 16, titled Pétalos sueltos. She then moved back to Cuba with her parents, and later returned to Mexico, where she kept writing and obtained a role in her only film, Corazón bandolero (1934). She became a chair member of the Ateneo Mexicano de Mujeres and later moved back to Cuba, where she wrote the radionovela Yo no creo en los hombres, which was adapted in Mexico for telenovelas in 1969 and 1988. Upon the rise of Fidel Castro, she returned to Mexico, where she would remain for the rest of her life. Back in Mexico, she wrote Corazón salvaje, a novel that has been adapted to the screen twice and as a telenovela four times (including once as Juan del Diablo in Puerto Rico). She then wrote La intrusa, Bodas de odio and other novels that earned her important awards.

== The nature of her work ==
Caridad Bravo Adams can easily be identified as the Margaret Mitchell of telenovelas. Though she has her own style of writing, Caridad's most successful stories are the ones in which she deals with the Margaret Mitchell-like topic of loveless marriage and the process of conquering one's wife. In Corazón salvaje, La mentira, Bodas de odio (and later Amor real), El otro (and later Por tu amor) she deals with the subject of a seemingly loveless marriage that turns out not to be so. Just like Mitchell, Caridad explores the human psychology from the perspective of a protagonist who ignores her true emotions and goes through a process of realizing the feelings that were there all along. Hence a love and hate relationship begins until finally the emotional worlds of the couple come to light. Her male figure is always a dashing Rhett Buttler, noble, strong but hiding his feelings behind irony. Her female figure on the other hand varies keeping as only thing in common with Mitchell's Scarlet O'Hara, her strength of character and stubbornness.

== Films as an actress ==
- Corazón bandolero (1934)

== As a writer ==
=== Poetry ===
- Pétalos sueltos (1924)
- Reverbación (1931)
- Trópico (1933)
- Marejada (1940)

=== Novels ===
- La mentira o El amor nunca muere (1952)
- Corazón salvaje (1956)
- Tzintzuntzn (La Noche de los Muertos)-1967
- Bodas de odio
- La imperdonable
- La intrusa
- Yo no creo en los hombres
- Cuatrilogía primordial

=== Plays ===
- Agustín Ramírez (1962)

=== Films ===
- La mentira (1952)
- Pecado mortal (1955)
- Corazón salvaje (1956)
- Orgullo de mujer (1956, novel El otro)
- Cuentan de una mujer (1959)
- Corazón salvaje (1968)
- Deborah (1968)
- La mentira (1970)
- Estafa de amor (1970)

=== Telenovelas ===
- La mentira
- Yo no creo en los hombres
- La intrusa/ Gabriela
- Pecado mortal
- El engaño/ Estafa de amor
- Corazón salvaje
- Orgullo de mujer
- El enemigo
- Adiós, amor mío
- Más allá del corazón
- Cita con la muerte
- Cristina Guzmán
- Sueña conmigo Donaji
- Más fuerte que el odio/ Amor en el desierto
- Lo prohibido
- Deborah
- La desconocida
- Águeda
- Cristina
- El precio de un hombre
- La hiena
- Mamá
- Aprendiendo a amar
- Alma y carne
- Bodas de odio
- Herencia maldita
- Una sombra entre los dos / Al pie del altar
- Tormenta de pasiones
- Un Paraíso Maldito / Azul infierno
- Nunca te Olvidare 1999

== Awards ==
- Nezahualcóyolt medal of the Mexican Writers Guild
