= List of telenovelas =

This article contains a list of telenovelas sorted by their country of origin. Telenovelas are a style of limited-run television soap operas, particularly prevalent in Latin America.

== Angola ==
- Windeck

== Argentina ==
- Alas, Poder y Pasión ("Wings, Power and Passion")
- Alen, Luz de Luna ("Alen, Moonlight")
- Alma Pirata ("Pirate Soul")
- Amigos son los Amigos ("Friends Will Be Friends")
- Amor Latino ("Latin Love")
- Amor Mío ("My Love")
- Amor Prohibido ("Forbidden Love") 1987
- Amor Sagrado ("Sacred Love")
- Andrea Celeste 1979
- Antonella 1992
- Atraccionx4 ("Attraction to the 4th Power")
- Buenos Vecinos ("Good Neighbors")
- Cabecita ("Little Head")
- Campeones de la Vida ("Champions of Life")
- Cara Bonita ("Pretty Face")
- Carola Casini
- Casi Ángeles ("Almost Angels")
- Celeste, Siempre Celeste ("Celeste, Always Celeste") 1993
- Clave de Sol ("G-Clef") 1987–1990
- Collar De Esmeraldas ("Emerald Necklace")
- Como Vos y Yo ("Like You And Me")
- Con alma de tango ("With Tango Soul")
- Corazones de Fuego ("Hearts of Fire")
- Cosecharás tu Siembra ("You Reap What You Sow")
- Costumbres Argentinas ("Argentine Customs")
- Culpable de este Amor ("Guilty of This Love")
- Culpables ("Sinners")
- De corazón ("Sincerely")
- Déjate Querer ("Let Yourself To Be Loved")
- Doble Vida ("Double Life")
- Dr. Amor ("Dr. Love")
- Dulce Ana ("Sweet Ana")
- El Día Que Me Quieras ("The Day That You Love Me")
- El Refugio (de los Sueños) ("The Refuge (of Dreams)")
- El Sodero de Mi Vida ("The Soda-Water Salesman of my Life")
- El Tiempo No Para ("Time Doesn't Stop")
- El Último Verano ("The Last Summer")
- EnAmorArte
- Entre el Amor y el Poder ("Between Love and Power")
- Estrellita Mía ("My Little Star")
- Franco Buenaventura: El Profe ("Franco Buenaventura: Teacher")
- Frecuencia 04 ("Frequence 04")
- Gasoleros
- Gladiadores de Pompeya ("Gladiators of Pompeii")
- Hombre de Honor ("Man of Honor")
- Hombre de Mar ("Man of the Sea")
- Ilusiones Compartidas ("Shared Illusions")
- Inconquistable Corazón ("Unconquered Heart")
- Jesús, el Heredero ("Jesus, the Heir")
- Juanita, la Soltera ("Juanita, The Unmarried One")
- Kachorra
- La Extraña Dama ("Strange Lady")
- La Lola
- Laberinto ("Labyrinth")
- Los Buscas de Siempre
- Los Cien Días de Ana ("Anna's One Hundred Days")
- Los Médicos de Hoy ("The Doctors of Today")
- Los pensionados ("Pensioners")
- Los Secretos de Papá ("Dad's Secrets")
- María de Nadie ("Maria Of Nobody") 1985
- Más Allá del Horizonte ("Beyond the Horizon")
- Máximo Corazón ("Maximum Heart")
- Media Falta ("Half Absence")
- Mía, Sólo Mía ("Mine, Only Mine")
- Mil Millones ("A Billion")
- Milady
- Montaña Rusa ("Rollercoaster")
- Naranja y Media ("Orange and a Half")
- Niní ("Nini")
- Pasiones ("Passions")
- PH (Propiedad Horizontal) ("Horizontal Property")
- Poliladron
- Por El Nombre de Dios ("In The Name of God")
- Por Siempre Mujercitas ("Always Little Women")
- Primer amor (with G.Corrado, Grecia Colmenares) ("First Love")
- Princesa ("Princess")
- Provócame ("Provoke Me")
- Resistiré ("Forever Julia"), 2003
- Ricos y Famosos ("Rich and Famous")
- Rincón de Luz ("Corner of Light")
- Sálvame María ("Save Me Maria")
- Se Dice Amor ("It Is Called 'Love'")
- Señorita Andrea ("Miss Andrea")
- Sheik
- Soy Gina ("I'm Gina")
- Una Familia Especial ("A Special Family")
- Verano del '98 ("Endless Summer")
- Yago, Pasión Morena ("Yago, Moreno Passion")
- Zíngara: Mujer Gitana ("Gypsy Woman")

== Bolivia ==
- Amor en tiempo seco ("The love in time of drought")
- Cambas en apuros ("Cambas in difficulties")
- Carmelo Hurtado
  - Carmelo Hurtado – El Retorno ("Carmelo Hurtado Returns")
- Chantaje de Amor ("Blackmail of love")
- Coraje Salvaje ("Wild courage")
- Hotelucho ("Poor Hotel")
- Indira
- La Fundación ("The Foundation")
- La Última Expedición ("The Last Expedition")
- La Virgen de las Siete Calles ("The Virgin of the Seven Streets")
- Las Tres Perfectas Solteras ("The Three Perfect Unmarried Women")
- Los Pioneros ("The Pioneers")
- Luna de Locos ("Moon of the crazies")
- Tardes Antiguas ("Old Afternoon")
- Tierra Adentro ("Inland")
- Una Vida, Un Destino ("A life, a destiny")

== Brazil ==
=== Rede Globo ===
- A Barba Azul ("The Blue Beard") – 1974
- A Casa das Sete Mulheres ("House of the Seven Women") – 2003
- A Deusa Vencida ("The Defeated Goddess")
- A Favorita ("The Favourite") – 2008
- A Gata Comeu ("The Cat Ate It") – 1985
- A Muralha ("The Wall") – 1968
- A Próxima Vítima ("The Next Victim") – 1995
- A Regra do Jogo ("The Rule of the Game") – 2015
- A Sucessora ("The Successor")
- A Viagem ("The Journey") – 1994
- Além do Tempo ("Beyond Time") – 2015
- Alma Gêmea ("Soulmate") – 2005
- América ("America") – 2005
- Amor à Vida ("Love for Life") – 2013
- Anjo Mau – 1976, Anjo Mau ("Evil Angel") – 1997
- Antônio Maria
- Aritana
- As Minas de Prata ("The Silver Mines")
- Avenida Brasil ("Brazil Avenue") – 2012
- Babilônia (refers to the Rio de Janeiro slum rather than Babylon) – 2015
- Baila Comigo ("Dance With Me") – 1981
- Bandeira Dois ("Flag Two"—referring to the higher night rate on taxicabs.)
- Barriga de Aluguel ("Rent Womb") – 1990
- Beleza Pura ("Pure Beauty") – 2008
- Belíssima ("Beautiful") – 2005
- Beto Rockfeller – 1968
- Bicho do Mato – 1972
- Boogie Oogie – 2014
- Cama de Gato ("Cat's Cradle") – 2009
- Carinhoso ("Affectionate")
- Celebridade ("Celebrity") – 2003
- Cheias de Charme ("All Charming") – 2012
- Chocolate com Pimenta ("Chocolate and Pepper") – 2003
- Cidadão Brasileiro ("Brazilian Citizen") – 2006
- Ciranda de Pedra ("Marble Dance") – 2008
- Cobras & Lagartos ("Snakes & Lizards") – 2006
- Coração de Estudante ("Student's Heart") – 2002
- Da Cor do Pecado ("Shades of Sin") – 2004
- Dancin' Days – 1978
- Desejo Proibido ("Forbidden Desire") – 2007
- Dona Beija – 1986
- Duas Caras ("Two-Faces") – 2008
- Em Família ("In Family") – 2014
- Éramos Seis ("We Were Six")
- Escalada ("The Way Up")
- Escrava Isaura ("Isaura – Slave Girl")
- Estúpido Cupido ("Stupid Cupid")
- Eta Mundo Bom! ("What a Good World!") – 2016
- Eterna Magia ("Eternal Magic") – 2007
- Feijão Maravilha ("Wonderful Bean")
- Guerra dos Sexos ("War of the Sexes")
- História de Amor ("Love Story") – 1995
- Hoje é dia de Maria ("Today is Mary's Day")
- Ídolo de Pano ("Cloth Idol")
- Império ("Empire") – 2014
- Insensato Coração ("Reckless Heart") – 2011
- Irmãos Coragem ("Brave Brothers")
- JK (Screen adaptation of the autobiography of Juscelino Kubitschek, Brazilian President from 1956 to 1961) – 2006
- Joia Rara ("Rare Jewel") – 2013
- Gabriela
- Laços de Família ("Family Ties") – 2000
- Liberdade, Liberdade ("Freedom, Freedom") – 2016
- Locomotivas ("Locomotives"—a 1970s slang for beautiful woman) – 1977
- Mad Maria
- Meu Rico Português ("My Rich Portuguese")
- Minha Doce Namorada ("My Sweet Girlfriend")
- Mulheres Apaixonadas ("Women in Love") – 2003
- Mulheres de Areia ("Women of Sand") – 1993
- Negócio da China ("China Business") – 2008
- Ninho da Serpente ("Snake's Nest")
- Nino, o Italianinho ("Nino, The Little Italian")
- O Astro (1977 TV series) – 1977
- O Astro (2011 TV series) – 2011
- O Beijo do Vampiro ("Kiss of the Vampire") – 2002
- O Bem-Amado ("The Well-Loved") – 1973
- O Casarão ("The Manor")
- O Clone ("The Clone") – 2001
- O Cravo e a Rosa ("The Carnation and the Rose") – 2000
- O Direito de Nascer ("The Right to Be Born") – 1964
- O Direito de Nascer – 1978
- O Espigão ("The Skyscraper")
- O Machão ("The Macho Man")
- O Profeta ("The Prophet")
- O Rebu ("The Big Confusion")
- O Rei do Gado ("The Cattle King") – 1996
- Os Imigrantes ("The Immigrants")
- Os Ossos do Barão ("The Bones of the Baron")
- Páginas da Vida ("Pages of Life") – 2006
- Pai Herói ("Hero Father") – 1979
- Paixões Proibidas ("Forbidden Loves")
- Pão pão, Beijo beijo ("Bread Bread, Kiss Kiss") – 1983
- Paraíso Tropical ("Tropical Paradise") – 2007
- Pigmalião 70 ("Pygmalion '70") – 1970
- Por Amor ("For Love") – 1997
- Quatro por Quatro ("Four By Four") – 1994
- Que Rei Sou Eu? ("What King Am I?") – 1989
- Rainha da Sucata ("Queen of the Scrap Metal") – 1990
- Redenção ("Redemption")
- Roda de Fogo ("Wheel of Fire") – 1986
- Roque Santeiro – 1985
- Salve Jorge ("Hail George") – 2012
- Sangue do Meu Sangue ("Blood of My Blood")
- Saramandaia
- Selva de Pedra ("Stone Jungle")
- Senhora do Destino ("Lady of Destiny") – 2004
- Sete Pecados ("Seven Sins") – 2007
- Sete Vidas ("Seven Lives") – 2015
- Sinhá Moça ("Little Missy", "Niña Moza")
- Sonho Meu ("My Dream") – 1993
- Terra Nostra (Italian for "Our Land") – 1999
- Tieta – 1989
- Totalmente Demais ("Totally Awesome") – 2015
- Três Irmãs ("Three Sisters") – 2008
- Um Só Coração ("Only One Heart") – 2004
- Vale Tudo ("Anything Goes") – 1988
- Vamp – 1991
- Velho Chico ("Old Chico", referring to the São Francisco River) – 2016
- Verdades Secretas ("Secret Truths") – 2015
- Vereda Tropical ("Tropical Path") – 1984

=== Rede Record ===
- Alta Estação ("High Season")
- Amor e Intrigas ("Love and Intrigue")
- Bicho do Mato ("Wild Animal")
- Caminhos do Coração ("Ways of the Heart")
  - Os Mutantes: Caminhos do Coração ("The Mutants: Ways of the Heart"—spin-off from the above)
- Chamas da Vida ("Flames of Life")
- Dona Xepa
- Escrava Mãe ("Mother Slave")
- Essas Mulheres ("Those Women")
- José do Egito ("Joseph of Egypt")
- Luz do Sol ("Light of the Sun")
- Os Dez Mandamentos ("The Ten Commandments")
- Pecado mortal ("Mortal Sin")
- Poder Paralelo ("Parallel Power")
- Prova de Amor ("Test of Love")
- Rebelde
- Sol de Verão ("Summer Sun")
- Vidas Opostas ("Opposite Lives")
- Vitória ("Victory")

=== Rede Bandeirantes ===
- Água na Boca ("Water in My Mouth")
- Água Viva ("Jellyfish")
- Dance, Dance, Dance
- Floribella

=== Sistema Brasileiro de Televisão ===
- Amor e Revolução ("Love and Revolution")
- Carrossel
- Chiquititas
- O Direito de Nascer (2001 version)
- Éramos Seis

=== Rede Manchete ===
- Kananga do Japão ("Japan's House")
- Pantanal
- Xica da Silva

== Canada ==
- 4 et demi... (4:30)
- Diva
- Francoeur
- Jasmine
- La famille Plouffe
- Lance et Compte
- Le Coeur a ses raisons
- Les Belles Histoires des pays d'en haut
- Les Dames de coeur
- Virginie

== Chile ==
- A La Sombra del Angel ("In the shadow of the angel")
- A Todo Dar ("Top Speed")
- Adrenalina ("Adrenaline")
- Algo está cambiando ("Something's Changing")
- Alguien te mira ("Somebody is looking at you")
- Ámame ("Love me")
- Amor a domicilio ("Love for Delivery")
- Amor por accidente
- Amores de mercado ("Loves from the Market")
- Angel malo ("Bad Angel", remake of Anjo Mau)
- Aquelarre ("Witches' sabbath")
- Bellas y audaces ("Beautiful and bold girls")
- Brujas ("Witches")
- Cerro Alegre ("Happy Hill")
- Champaña ("Champagne")
- Cómplices ("Accomplices")
- Destinos Cruzados ("Crossed Destinies")
- Don Amor ("Mr. Love")
- El amor está de moda ("The love is quite the thing")
- El Circo de las Montini ("The Montini's Circus")
- El señor de La Querencia ("The Lord of the haunt")
- Estúpido Cupido ("Stupid Cupid", remake of Estúpido Cupido)
- Fuera de control ("Out of Control")
- Gatas y tuercas ("Jacks and Nuts")
- Hijos del Monte ("Monte's sons")
- Hippie
- Ídolos ("Idols")
- Iorana (rapa nui word for "Hello")
- Jaque Mate ("Checkmate")
- Juegos de fuego ("Fire games")
- La Dama del Balcón ("The Lady of the Balcony")
- La fiera ("The Wild Animal")
- La Invitación ("The Invitation")
- La Madrastra ("The Stepmother")
- La Quintrala ("A female character of the Chilean History")
- La Torre 10 ("The tower 10")
- La última cruz ("The last cruise")
- Loca piel ("Crazy skin")
- Los Capo ("The Capos")
- Los Pincheira ("The Pincheiras")
- Los títeres ("The Puppets")
- Los 30 ("30")
- Machos ("Macho Men")
- Mala Conducta ("Bad Behavior")
- Marparaíso
- Marrón Glacé
- Matrimonio de Papel ("Marriage of paper")
- Mi nombre es Lara ("My name's Lara")
- Oro verde ("Green gold")
- Pampa Ilusión ("Illusion of Pampa")
- Papi Ricky
- Playa Salvaje ("Wild Beach")
- Purasangre ("Bloodstock")
- Rojo y miel ("Red and Honey")
- Romané ("Gypsies")
- Rompecorazón ("Heartbreaker")
- Rossabella
- Santo Ladrón ("Saint thief")
- Semidiós ("Semigod")
- Sucupira
- Tentación ("Temptation")
- Tic Tac
- Trampas y Caretas ("Cheats and Masks")
- Floribella
- Villa Nápoli ("Napoli villa")
- Viuda Alegre ("Cheerful")

== Croatia ==
=== AVA Production ===
- Villa Maria ("Villa Maria") (2004–2005)
- Ljubav u zaleđu ("Love in offside") (2005–2006)
- Obični ljudi ("Ordinary people") (2006–2007)
- Ponos Ratkajevih ("Ratkaj's pride") (2007–2008)
- Zakon ljubavi ("The law of love") (2008)

=== RTL Televizija ===
- Ne daj se, Nina ("Don't give up, Nina") (2008)
- Ruža vjetrova ("Rose of winds") (2011–2013)
- Tajne ("Secrets") (2013–2014)
- Vatre ivanjske ("Ivanja fires") (2014–2015)
- Prava žena ("True Woman") (2016–2017)
- Pogrešan čovjek ("A Wrong Man") (coproduction with Serbia) (2018–2019)

=== Ring Multimedia ===
- Sve će biti dobro ("Everything is going to be fine") (2008–2009)
- Dolina sunca ("Valley of the sun") (2009–2010)
- Pod sretnom zvijezdom ("Under a lucky star") (2011)

=== Nova TV ===
- Najbolje godine ("The best years") (2009–2011)
- Larin izbor ("Lara's choice") (2011–2013)
- Zora dubrovačka ("Dubrovnik's dawns") (2013–2014)
- Kud puklo da puklo ("No mather what") (2014–2016)
- Zlatni dvori ("Golden palace") (2016–2017)
- Čista ljubav ("Pure love") (2017–2018)
- Na granici ("At the border") (2018–2019)
- Drugo ime ljubavi ("The other name of love") (2019–2020)
- Dar mar ("Mess") (2020–2021)
- Kumovi ("The Godfathers") (2022–present)

== Dominican Republic ==
- María José, Oficios Del Hogar ("María José, Housewife")
- Catalino El Dichoso ("Lucky Catalino")
- En La Boca De Los Tiburones ("Inside The Sharks' Mouth")
- Trópico ("Tropical Paradise")

== El Salvador ==
- Más allá de la angustia ("Beyond the anguish")

== Germany ==
- Alisa – Folge deinem Herzen – "Alisa – Follow your Heart" (2009)
- Anna und die Liebe – "Anna and Love" (2008–2009)
- Bianca – Wege zum Glück – "Bianca – Ways to Happiness" (2004–2005)
- Das Geheimnis meines Vaters – "Mystery of my Father" (2006)
- Lotta in Love (2006–2007)
- Rote Rosen – "Red Roses" (since 2006)
- Tessa – Leben für die Liebe – "Tessa – A Life for Love" (2005–2006)
- Schmetterlinge im Bauch – "Love is in the air" (2006–2007)
- Sophie – Braut wider Willen – "Sophie – The Unwilling Bride" (2005–2006)
- Sturm der Liebe – "Tempest of Love" (since 2005)
- Verliebt in Berlin – "Falling in Love in Berlin" (2005–2007)
- Wege zum Glück – "Ways to Happiness" (2005–2009)

== Hungary ==
=== Paprika Studios ===
- Oltári csajok – "Glorious Gals" (2017–2018)

== Mexico ==
=== Televisa ===
- Abismo de pasión – "Abyss of Passion" (2012)
- Abrázame muy fuerte – "Hold Me Very Tightly" (2000–2001)
- Agujetas de color de rosa – "Pink-colored Shoelaces" (1994)
- Al diablo con los guapos – "To Hell with the Handsome" (2007–2008)
- Alborada – "Dawn" (2006)
- Alcanzar una estrella – "Reach a Star" (1990)
- Alcanzar una estrella II – "Reach a Star II" (1991)
- Alegrijes y Rebujos – "Alegrijes & Rebujos" (2004)
- Alguna Vez Tendremos Alas – "Someday We Shall Have Wings" (1997)
- Alma de Hierro – "Soul of Iron" (2008)
- Alondra – "Alondra" (1995–1996)
- Amar sin límites – "Loving without Limits" (2006)
- Amarte es mi pecado – "Loving You is My Sin" (2004)
- Amigas y rivales – "Friends and Rivals" (2001)
- Amigo de Insectos – "Bug Buddies" (2010)
- Amigos x siempre – "Friends Forever" (2000)
- Amor- "Love" (2011)
- Amor de nadie – "Nobody's Love" (1985)
- Amor en silencio – "Love in Silence" (1988)
- Amor Gitano – "Gypsy Love" (1998)
- Amor real – "True Love" (2005)
- Amor sin maquillaje – "Love Without Make-up" (2007)
- Amores verdaderos – "True loves" (2012–2013)
- Amy, la niña de la mochila azul – "Amy, The Little Girl with the Blue Backpack" (2005)
- Ana del aire (1973–1974)
- Apuesta por un amor – "Bet For a Love" (2003)
- Atrévete a soñar – "Dare to Dream" (2009–2010)
- Ave fénix – "Phoenix" (1986)
- Aventuras en el tiempo – "Adventures in Time" (2001)
- Bajo la misma piel – "Beneath the Same Skin" (2005)
- Bajo las riendas del amor – "Underneath The Reigns of Love" (2007)
- Barrera de Amor – "Barrier of Love" (2005)
- Bodas de odio – "Weddings of Hate" (1983)
- Brittania Fuerte – "Spanish Love" (2012–2013)
- Cadenas de amargura – "Chains of Bitterness" (1991)
- Camaleones – "Cameleon" (2009–2010)
- Camila (1998)
- Cañaveral de Pasiones – "Sugarcane Field of Passions" (1996–1997), remake of Canavial de Paixões
- Carita de Ángel – "Little Angel Face" (1999–2000)
- Carrusel – "Carrousel" (1989)
- Carrusel de las Américas – "Carrousel of the Americas" (1992)
- Chispita- "Little Spark" (1982)
- Cicatrices de Alma- "Scars of The Soul" (1986)
- Clase 406 – "Class 406" (2002–2003)
- Código Postal – "Zip Code" (2006)
- Colorina (1980)
- Cómplices al rescate – "Accomplices to the Rescue" (2002)
- Confidente de Secundaria – "Middle School Confidant" (1995)
- Contra Viento y Marea – "Against Wind and Tide" (2005)
- Corazón Indomable – "Wild at Heart" (2013)
- Corazón salvaje – "Wild Heart" (1993)
- Corazón Salvaje (2009 TV series)- "Wild Soul" (2009–2010)
- Corona de lágrimas- "Crown of Tears"
- Cuando llega el amor – "When Love Comes" (1989–1990)
- Cuando me enamoro – "When I fall in Love" (2010–2011)
- Cuidado con el Ángel – "Watch out for the Angel" (2008)
- Cuna de lobos – "Cradle of Wolves" (1986)
- De frente al sol – "Facing the Sun" (1992)
- De pocas, pocas pulgas – "Of Few Fleas" (2003)
- De pura sangre- "Of Pure Blood" (1990)
- Décadas – "Decade" (2011)
- Dos mujeres, un camino – "Two Women, One Path" (1993–1994)
- Dos vidas – "Two Lives" (1988)
- Duelo de Pasiones – "Duel of Passions" (2006)
- Dulce Desafío – "Sweet Challenge" (1990)
- El Amor No Tiene Precio – "Love Doesn't Have a Price"
- El Camino Secreto – "The Secret Path" (1988)
- El carruaje – "The Carriage" (1985)
- El Cartel – "(Mexico's Version)" (2011–2012)
- El derecho de nacer – "The Right to be Born" (It has three versions: 1961, 1981 and 2001)
- El diario de Daniela – "Daniela's Diary" (1998)
- El Extraño Retorno de Diana Salazar – "The Strange Return of Diana Salazar" (1988)
- El hogar que yo robé – "The Home I Stole" (1971)
- El juego de la vida – "The Game of Life" (2002)
- El maleficio – "The Curse" (1983)
- El Manantial – "The Spring" (2001)
- El Pecado de Oyuki – "Oyuki's sin" (1988)
- El precio de tu amor – "The Price of Your Love" (2000)
- El premio mayor – "The Major Prize" (1995–1996)
- El privilegio de amar – "The privilege of Loving" (1997–1998)
- El Triunfo del Amor – "Triumph of Love" (2010–2011)
- El Vuelo del Aguila- "The Flight of the Eagle" (1999)
- En Nombre del Amor – "In the Name of Love" (2008)
- Entre el Amor y el Odio – "Between Love and Hate" (2002)
- Esmeralda (1997)
- Esperándote – "Waiting for You" (1985)
- Esperanza del Corazón – "Hope of the heart" (2011)
- Fuego en le sangre – "Fire in the Blood" (2008)
- Gabriel y Gabriela – "Gabriel and Gabriela" (1986)
- Guadalupe (1984)
- Hasta Que El Dinero Nos Separe – "Until Money Do Us Part" (2009–2010)
- Herencia maldita – "Cursed Inheritance"
- Heridas de amor – "Wounds of Love" (2006–2007)
- Huracan – "Hurricane" (1997–1998)
- Imperio de Cristal – "Crystal Empire" (1994)
- Inocente de Ti – "Innocent of You" (2005)
- Juana Iris (1985)
- Laberintos de pasión (1999–2000)
- La Antorche Encendida – "The Lighted Torch" (1996)
- La casa en la playa – "Beach House" (2000)
- La constitución – "The Constitution" (1958)
- La Desalmada – "Heartless" (2021)
- La Dueña- "The Owner" (1995)
- La Esposa Virgen – "The Virgin Wife" (2005)
- La Fea Más Bella – "The Prettiest Ugly Woman" (2006)
- La fuerza del amor – "The Strength of Love"
- La Fuerza del destino – "The Strength of Destiny" (2011)
- La Intrusa – "The Intruder" (2001)
- La Madrastra – "The Stepmother" (2005)
- La Mentira – "The Lie" (1998)
- La Otra – "The Other Woman" (2002)
- La pasión de Isabela – "Isabela's passion) (1984)
- La Pobre Señorita Limantour – "The Poor Miss Limantour" (1989)
- La que no podía amar – "The one who could not love" (2011–2012)
- La sonrisa del Diablo – "The Smile of the Devil" (1992)
- La Traición- "The Treason" (1984)
- La trampa – "The Trap" (1988)
- La usurpadora – "The Usurper" (1998)
- La venganza – "Vengeance" (1977)
- La Verdad Oculta – "The Hidden Truth" (2005–2006)
- Laberintos de pasión – "Labyrinths of Passion" (1999–2000)
- Las Dos Caras de Ana – "The Two Faces of Ana" (2006)
- Las Tontas No Van al Cielo – "Dumb Women Don't Go To Heaven" (2007–2008)
- Las Vías del Amor – "The Paths of Love" (2002)
- Lazos de Amor- "Love Ties" (1995)
- Llena de Amor- "Full of Love" (2010)
- Locura de Amor – "Crazy Love" (1999–2000)
- Lola...Érase una vez – "Lola... Once upon a time" (2007)
- Los años pasan "Years pass" (1985)
- Los Hijos De Nadie- "Nobody's Children"
- Los parientes pobres – "The Poor Kin" (1993)
- Los Ricos También Lloran – "Rich People Also Cry" (1979)
- Lo que la vida me robó – "What Life Took From Me" (2014)
- Luz Clarita -"Clear Light" (1996)
- Luz y sombra – "Light and Shadow" (1989)
- Mañana Es Para Siempre – "Tomorrow is forever" (2009)
- Mañana Será Otro Día – "Tomorrow Will Be Another Day"
- Mar de amor – "Curse by the sea" (2009)
- María Belén – (2001)
- Maria Isabel (1997)
- María la del Barrio – "Maria from the Ghetto" (1995)
- Maria Mercedes (1992)
- Mariana de la noche – "Mariana of the Night" (2003)
- Marimar (1994)
- Marisol (1996)
- Martín Garatuza
- Mi Destino Eres Tú – "My Destiny is You" (2000)
- Mi Pecado – "Burden of guilt " (2009)
- Mi Pequeña Soledad – "My Little Loneliness" (1991)
- Mi pequeña traviesa – "My Mischievous Little One" (1997–1998)
- Mi Segunda Madre- "My Second Mother" (1990)
- Milagro y magia – "Miracle and Magic" (1991)
- Misión S.O.S – "S.O.S Mission" (2005)
- Monte Calvario – "Calvary Mountain"
- Morir para vivir – "Die to live" (1989)
- Muchacha italiana viene a casarse – "Italian Girl Comes to get Married" (1970)
- Muchachitas – "Young Girls" (1991)
- Muchachitas como tú – "Young Girls like you" (2007)
- Mujer de Nadie – "A Woman of Her Own" (2022)
- Mujer de Madera – "Woman of wood" (2004)
- Mujeres Engañadas – "Women (Who Have Been Cheated On)" (1999–2000)
- Mundo de Fieras – "World of Wilds" (2006)
- Mundo de juguete – "Toy world" (1976)
- Navidad sin fin – "Neverending Christmas" (2000)
- Niña Amada Mía – "My Loved Girl" (2004)
- Nunca te olvidaré – "I Will Never Forget You" (1999)
- Pablo y Andrea – "Pablo and Andrea" (2006)
- Pasión – "Passion" (2007)
- Pasión y poder – "Passion and Power" (1988)
- Peregrina- "Pilgrim" (2006)
- Piel de otoño – "Autumn Skin" (2004)
- Por tu amor – "For your Love" (1999)
- Por un beso – "For a Kiss" (2000)
- Preciosa – "Precious" (1999)
- Primer amor... a mil por hora – "First Love...at 1000 per hour" (2000–2001)
- Prisionera de amor – "Prisoner of Love" (1994)
- Pura Sangre – "Pure Blood"
- Querida Enemiga – "Dearest Enemy" (2008)
- Quinceañera- "Quinceañera" (1987–1988)
- Rafaela más que una historia de amor – "Rafaela more than a love story" (2011)
- Ramona (1999–2000)
- Rebelde – "Rebel" (2004–2006)
- Rina (1977)
- Rosa salvaje – "Wild Rose" (1987)
- Rosalinda (1999)
- Rubí – "Ruby" (1974 and 2005)
- Salomé "Salome" (2002)
- Sandra y Paulina – "Sandra and Paulina"
- Seducción – "Seduction" (1986)
- Señora tentación – "Mrs. Temptation"
- Si nos dejan – "If They Let Us" (2021)
- Simplemente María – "Simply Maria" (1989)
- Soledad (1980)
- Soñadoras – "Dreamers" (1998)
- Sortilegio – "Spell" (2009)
- Soy Tu Dueña – "I'm Your Owner" (2010)
- Sueños y Caramelos- "Dreams & Sweets" (2006–2007)
- Te sigo amando – "I'm Still in Love with You" (1997)
- Teresa (1989)
- Teresa (2010 TV Series) – "Teresa" (2010–2011)
- Tormenta en el paraíso – (2009)
- Tres mujeres – "Three Women" (1999)
- Triángulo – "Triangle" (1992)
- Triunfo del amor – "Love Triumph" (2011)
- Tu o Nadie – "You or No One" (1985)
- Un Gancho al Corazon – "A Jab to the Heart" (2008)
- Valentina (1993)
- Valeria y Maximiliano "Valeria and Maximiliano" (1990)
- Vanessa (1982)
- Verano de amor – "Summer of love" (2009)
- Victoria (1987)
- ¡Vivan los niños! – "Long Live the Kids" (2004)
- Viviana (1978)
- Vivir un poco – "To Live a Little" (1985)
- Volver a Empezar – "Starting Over" (1994–1995)
- Yara – "Yara" (1979)
- Yesenia (1987)
- Yo amo a Juan Querendón – "I Love Juan Querendon" (2007–2008)
- Yo compro esa mujer – "I Buy That Woman"

=== TV Azteca ===
- Agua y Aceite- "Water & Oil"
- Al Norte del Corazon- "To the North of the Heart"
- Amor en Custodia – "Love in Custody"
- Amores... Querer con Alevosía- "Loves... to Love with an advantage"
- Azul Tequila – "Tequila Blue"
- Belinda
- Bellezas Indomables- "Untaimed Beauties"
- Besos prohibidos- "Forbidden Kisses"
- Cara o cruz- "Heads or Tails"
- Catalina y Sebastián- "Catalina and Sebastian"
- Cielo rojo- "Red Sky"
- Como en el cine- "Like in the movies"
- Con Toda el Alma- "With all my Soul"
- Contrato de Amor- "Love Contract"
- Cuando Seas Mia- "When you're Mine"
- Demasiado Corazón – "Too Much Heart"
- Destino – "Destiny"
- Dos chicos de cuidado en la ciudad- "Two guys to be careful of... in the city"
- El Alma Herida- "The Wounded Soul"
- El Amor de Mi Vida- "The Love of my Life"
- El amor no es como lo pintan- "Love is not like what they tell you"
- El Candidato- "The Candidate"
- El País de las Mujeres- "The Country of Women"
- Ellas, inocentes o culpables- "Them, Innocents or Guilty"
- Emperatriz- "Empress"
- Enamórate- "Falling in love"
- Golpe Bajo- "Low Punch"
- Háblame de Amor- "Talk to me about Love"
- La Calle de las Novias- "The Bride Street"
- La Chacala- "The (female) Jackal"
- La duda- "The Doubt"
- La Heredera- "The Heiress"
- La Hija del Jardinero- "The Gardener´s daughter"
- La mujer de Judas- "The Woman of Judas"
- La otra cara del alma- "The Other Face of The Soul"
- La Otra Mitad del Sol- "The Other Half of the Sun"
- La Vida en el Espejo- "The Life in the Mirror"
- Las Juanas – "The Juanas (family)"
- Lo que es el amor – "What Love Is"
- Los Sánchez- "The Sanchezes(family)"
- Marea Brava- "Strong Tide"
- Mientras Haya Vida- "While there´s still life"
- Mirada de mujer- "A Woman's Glance"
- Mirada de Mujer: El Regreso- "A Woman´s Glance: The Return"
- Montecristo- "Montecristo"
- Nada personal – "Nothing Personal"
- Noche Eterna- "Everlasting Night"
- Perla – "Pearl"
- Por Tí- "For You"
- Rivales por Accidente- "Rivals by accident"
- Romántica Obsesión- "Romantic Obsession"
- Señora- "Lady"
- Sin Tí- "Without You"
- Soñarás- "You'll dream"
- Súbete a mi moto- "Get on my motorcycle"
- Tengo Todo excepto a Tí- "I have everything but you"
- Tentaciones- "Temptations"
- Tiempo de Amar- "Time to Love"
- Tío Alberto- "Uncle Albert"
- Todo por Amor- "All for Love"
- Top Models
- Tres Veces Sofía- "Three Times Sofia"
- Un Nuevo Amor- "A New Love"
- Vivir Sin Ti/Vivir Por Ti- "To Live Without You / To Live For You"
- Vivir un poco- "To Live a little"
- Yacaranday

=== Argos Comunicación ===
- Amor Descarado "Shameless Love"
- Amores... Querer con Alevosía- "Loves... to Love with an advantage"
- Cara o cruz- "Heads or Tails"
- Contrato de Amor- "Love Contract"
- Corazón Partido- "Broken Heart"
- Daniela
- Demasiado Corazón- "Too Much Heart"
- El Amor de Mi Vida- "The Love of My Life"
- El Alma Herida- "The Wounded Soul"
- Gitanas "Gypsies" (co-produced with Telemundo)
- La Vida en el Espejo- "The Life in the Mirror"
- Ladrón de Corazones- "Thief of hearts"
- Los Plateados- "The Silvers"
- Marina
- Mientras Haya Vida- "While there´s still life"
- Mirada de mujer- "A Woman's Glance"
- Mirada de Mujer: El Regreso- "A Woman´s Glance: The Return"
- Nada personal – "Nothing Personal"
- Rosa Diamante – Rose of Diamonds
- Tentaciones- "Temptations"
- Todo por Amor- "All for Love"
- Vivir Sin Ti/Vivir Por Ti- "To Live Without You / To Live For You"

== Panama ==
- Linda Labé
- ¿Cómo casar a Chente?
- Lagrimas de Diamante
- Pobre Millonaria

== Paraguay ==
- Papá del Corazón ("Heart Daddy")
- De Mil Amores (Desperately in Love)
- La Doña (Mrs. Francisca Cabañas)
- Verdad Oculta

== Peru ==
- Pobre Diabla ("Wretch")
- Luz Maria
- Leonela, Muriendo de Amor ("Leonela, Dying of Love")
- Cosas del Amor ("Things of Love")
- Cazando a un millonario ("Hunting a Millionaire")
- Girasoles para Lucía ("Sunflowers for Lucía")
- Besos robados ("Stolen Kisses")
- Carmín
- El adorable professor Aldao ("The Adorable Professor Aldao")
- Natacha
- Simplemente María ("Simply Maria")
- Travesuras del corazón ("Pranks of the Heart")
- Luciana y Nicolás ("Luciana and Nicolás")
- Me llaman Gorrión ("They call me Gorrión")
- Nino... las cosas simples de la vida ("Nino... The Simple Things in life")
- Los de arriba y los de abajo ("Those Ones From Above and Those Ones From Below")
- ¡Qué buena raza! (Pun of "What a Nerve!" literally translating "What A Good Race")
- Eva del Edén ("Eve of Eden")
- Hermanos Coraje ("Courage Brothers")
- Torbellino ("Whirlwind")
- Los unos y los otros ("The Ones and the Others")
- La Rica Vicky ("Vicky the Delightful")
- Amor serrano ("Serrano Love")
- Los Choches ("The Buddies")
- Al Fondo Hay Sitio ("There's Room At The Back")
- Gente Como Uno ("People Like One")
- Mil Oficios ("Jack of All Trades")
- Demasiada Belleza ("Too Much Beauty")
- Dina Paucar: La Lucha Por Un Sueño ("Dina Paucar: The Fight For A Dream")
- Latin lover ("Latin Lover")
- El Gran Reto ("The Great Challenge")
- Gamboa ("Gamboa")
- Paginas De La Vida ("Pages of Life")
- No Hay Por Que Llorar ("There's No Reason for Crying")
- Solo por ti ("Only For You")
- Matalache ("Matalache")
- Bésame Tonto ("Kiss me, You Dumb")
- Las Mujeres De Mi Vida ("The Women of my Life")
- Clave uno ("Code One")
- Tatán ("Tantán")
- Cuando Los Angeles Lloran ("When Angels Cry")
- Secretos ("Secrets")

== Portugal ==
- Vila Faia (1982),(Beech Village) [RTP]
- Origens (1983), (Origins) [RTP]
- Chuva na Areia (1985), (The Rain on the Sand) [RTP]
- Palavras Cruzadas (1987), (Crosswords) [RTP]
- Passerelle (1988), [RTP]
- Ricardina e Marta (1989), [RTP]
- Cinzas (1992), (Ashes) [RTP]
- A Banqueira do Povo (1993), (The Banker of the People) [RTP]
- Telhados de Vidro (1993), (Glass Roofs) [TVI]
- Verão Quente (1993), (Hot Summer) [RTP]
- Na Paz dos Anjos (1994), (In Heavenly Peace) [RTP]
- Desencontros (1994), (Mismatches) [RTP]
- Roseira Brava (1995), (Briar Rose) [RTP]
- Primeiro Amor (1995), (First Love) [RTP]
- Vidas de Sal (1996), (Salt Lives) [RTP]
- Filhos do Vento (1996), (The Children of the Wind) [RTP]
- A Grande Aposta (1997), (The Great Bet) [RTP]
- Terra Mãe (1998), (Motherland) [RTP]
- Os Lobos (1998), (The Wolves) [RTP]
- A Lenda da Garça (1999), (The Heron Legend) [RTP]
- Todo o Tempo do Mundo (1999), (All the time in the world) [TVI]
- Ajuste de Contas (2000), (The Reckoning) [RTP]
- Jardins Proibidos (2000), (Forbidden Gardens) [TVI]
- Senhora das Águas (2001), (The Lady of the Waters) [RTP]
- Ganância (2001), (Greed) [SIC]
- Olhos de Água (2001), (Water Eyes) [TVI]
- Nunca Digas Adeus (2001), (Never say Goodbye) [TVI]
- Filha do Mar (2001), (The Daughter of the Sea) [TVI]
- Anjo Selvagem (2001/2002), (Wild Angel) [TVI]
- Lusitana Paixão (2002), (Portuguese Passion)
- Fúria de Viver (2002), (Rage of Living) [SIC]
- O Olhar da Serpente (2002), (Snake Stare)
- Tudo Por Amor (2002), (All for Love) [TVI]
- Sonhos Traídos (2002), (Betrayed Dreams) [TVI]
- O Último Beijo (2002), (The Last Kiss) [TVI]
- Amanhecer (2002), (Dawn) [TVI]
- O Jogo (2003), (The Game) [SIC]
- Saber Amar (2003), (Know How to Love) [TVI]
- Coração Malandro (2003), (Naughty Heart) [TVI]
- O Teu Olhar (2003), (Your Stare) [TVI]
- Queridas Feras (2003/2004), (Dear Beasts) [TVI]
- Mistura Fina (2004/2005), (Fine Blend) [TVI]
- Baía das Mulheres (2004/2005), (Women Bay) [TVI]
- Ninguém Como Tu (2005), (No one like you) [TVI]
- Mundo Meu (2005/2006), (My World) [TVI]
- Dei-te Quase Tudo (2005/2006), (I gave you almost everything) [TVI]
- Fala-me de Amor (2006), (Talk to me about Love) [TVI]
- Floribella (2006) [SIC]
- Tempo de Viver (Time to live) [TVI]
- Jura (2006) (Promise me) [SIC]
- Doce Fugitiva (2006/2007), (Sweet Fugitive) [TVI]
- Tu e Eu (2006/2007), (You and me) [TVI]
- Paixões Proibidas (2007) (Forbidden Passions) [RTP]
- Vingança (2007) (Revenge) [SIC]
- Ilha dos Amores (2007), (Island of Love) [TVI]
- Resistirei (2007), (I Will Resist) [SIC]
- Deixa-me amar (2007), (Let Me Love) [TVI]
- Fascínios (2007), (Fascinations) [TVI]
- Rebelde Way (2008), (Rebel Way)
- A Outra (2008), (The Other) [TVI]
- Vila Faia 2008 (2008), [RTP]
- Flor do Mar (2008), (Flower of the Sea) [TVI]
- Olhos nos Olhos (2008), (Eye to eye) [TVI]
- Podia Acabar o Mundo (2008), (It Could End the World) [SIC]
- Feitiço de Amor (2008), (Love Spell) [TVI]
- Deixa que te leve (2009), (Let me take you) [TVI]
- Sentimentos (2009), (Feelings) [TVI]
- Meu Amor (2009), (My Love) [TVI]
- Perfeito Coração (2009), (Perfect Heart) [SIC]
- Mar de Paixão (2010), (Sea of Passion) [TVI]
- Lua Vermelha (2010), (Red Moon) [SIC]
- Espírito Indomável (2010), (Wild Spirit) [TVI]
- Laços de Sangue (2010), (Blood Ties)
- Sedução (2010), (Seduction) [TVI]
- Anjo Meu (2011), (Angel of Mine) [TVI]
- Remédio Santo (2011), (Holy Remedies) [TVI]
- Rosa Fogo (2011), (Firerose) [SIC]
- Doce Tentação (2012), (Sweet Temptation) [TVI]
- Dancin' Days (2012)
- Louco Amor (2012), (Crazy Love) [TVI]
- Destinos Cruzados (2012), (Crossed Destinies) [TVI]
- Doida por Ti (2012), (Crazy about You) [TVI]
- Mundo Ao Contrário (2013), (World Upside Down) [TVI]
- Sol de Inverno (2013), (Winter's Sun) [SIC]
- Os Nossos Dias (2013), (Our Days) [RTP]
- Belmonte (2013), (Belmonte) [TVI]
- Mulheres (2014), (Women) [TVI]
- O Beijo do Escorpião (2014), (Scorpion's Kiss) [TVI]
- Água de Mar (2014), (Sea's Water) [RTP]
- Mar Salgado (2014), (Salty Sea) [SIC]
- Jardins Proíbidos 2014 (2014), (Forbidden Gardens 2014) [TVI]
- Poderosas (2015), (Will for Revenge) [SIC]
- A Única Mulher (2015), (The Only Woman) [TVI]
- Coração D'ouro (2015), (Heart of Gold) [SIC]
- Rainha das Flores (2016), (Frozen Memories) [SIC]
- Amor Maior (2016), (More Than Love) [SIC]
- Sol de Inverno (2013), (Winter's Sun) [SIC]
- Espelho D'Água (2016), (Water Mirror) [SIC]
- Jogo Duplo (2017), (Double Game) [TVI]
- Ouro Verde (2017), (Payback) [TVI]
- O Sábio (2017), (The Wise One) [RTP]
- Paixão (2017), (Living Passion) [SIC]
- A Herdeira (2017), (The Gipsy Heiress) [TVI]
- A Teia (2018), (The Web) [TVI]
- Valor da Vida (2018), (Value of Life) [TVI]
- Vidas Opostas (2018), (Tangled Lives) [SIC]
- Alma e Coração (2018), (Heart and Soul) [SIC]
- Amar Depois de Amar (2019), (Loving After Loving) [TVI]
- Prisioneira (2019), (Trapped) [TVI]
- Alguém Perdeu (2019), (Someone Lost) [CMTV]
- Terra Brava (2019), (Wild Land) [SIC]
- Na Corda Bamba (2019), (On Thin Ice) [TVI]
- Nazaré (2019), (Nazaré) [SIC]
- Quer o Destino (2020), (Destiny Desires) [TVI]
- Amar Demais (2020), (Unlimited Love) [TVI]
- Bem Me Quer (2020), (Broken Bonds) [TVI]
- Amor Amor (2021), (Love is a Song) [SIC]
- A Serra (2021), (Mountain Range) [SIC]
- Festa é Festa (2021), (Party is Party) [TVI]
- Para Sempre (2021), (Forever) [TVI]
- Quero é Viver (2022), (I want to live) [TVI]
- Por Ti (2022), (For You) [SIC]
- Rua das Flores (2022), (Flowers Street) [TVI]
- Lua de Mel (2022), (Honeymoon) [SIC]

== Puerto Rico (U.S.) ==
- El Derecho de Nacer
- Entre la Espada y la Cruz
- El Retrato de Angela
- La Divina Infiel
- Cuatro Mujeres
- La sombra del otro
- La infamia
- Cuando los Hijos Condenan
- El Hijo de Angela María
- El Rosario (The Rosary)
- La Mujer de Aquella Noche
- Conciencia Culpable
- Los Dedos de la Mano
- Marcelo y Marcelina
- Juan de Dios
- Sombras del Pasado
- Cristina Bazan
- Mujeres sin Hombres
- La Otra Mujer
- La Intrusa
- Tomiko
- Mami Santa
- La Sombra de Belinda
- El Idolo
- Anacaona
- Martha Llorens
- El Amor Nuestro de Cada Dia
- Tanairi
- Amame (Love Me)
- La Jibarita
- Fue sin Querer
- Escándalo
- Rojo Verano
- Modelos S.A.
- Vida
- Millie
- Cadenas de Amor
- Coralito
- Karina Montaner
- Aventurera
- Cuando Vuelvas
- Vivir Para Ti
- Diana Carolina
- Yo Se Que Mentia
- Apartamento de Solteras
- La isla (The Island)
- La otra (The Other)
- Ave De Paso
- Alejandra
- Laura Guzman, ¡Culpable!
- Sombras del Pasado
- Preciosa
- La Verdadera Eva
- De que color es el amor?
- Tormento (Torment)
- Señora Tentación
- Dueña y Señora

== Serbia ==
- Jelena ("Jelena") (2004–2005)
- Ljubav i mržnja ("Love and hate") (2007–2008)
- Zaustavi vreme ("Stop the time") (2008)
- Istine i laži ("Truths and lies") (2017–2019)
- Pogrešan čovek ("The Wrong Man") (coproduction with Croatia) (2018–2019)
- Crveni mesec ("Red moon") (2019–2020)
- Tate ("Fathers") (2020–2021)
- Kolo sreće ("Wheel of fortune") (2021–2022)
- Od jutra do sutra ("From morning until tomorrow") (2022–2023)

== South Africa ==
- Ashes To Ashes
- Broken Vows
- Giyani: Land of Blood
- Gold Diggers
- High Rollers
- Isibaya
- Isithembiso
- Isipho
- Keeping Score
- Rockville
- The River
- Uzalo
- The Queen

== Turkey ==
- Paramparça
- Kera Sevda
- Brave and Beautiful
- Eve Donus
- Fatmagül'ün Suçu Ne?
- Cesur ve guzel

== Spain ==
- Marielena (1994)
- El Súper. Historias de todos los días (1996–99)
- Calle nueva (1997–2000)
- El secreto (2001)
- El secreto II (2001)
- Esencia de poder (2001)
- La verdad de Laura (2002)
- Géminis, venganza de amor (2002)
- Luna negra (2003)
- Obsesión (2005)
- El pasado es mañana (2005)
- Amar en tiempos revueltos (2005–12)
- Yo soy Bea (2006–08)
- Bandolera (2011–13)
- El secreto de Puente Viejo (2011–2020)
- Amar es para siempre (2013–2024)
- Acacias 38 (2015–2021)
- Seis Hermanas (2015–2017)

== United States ==
=== Telemundo ===
- Pasión de Gavilanes
- El Cuerpo del Deseo
- La Patrona
- En otra piel
- La Reina del Sur
- Alguien te Mira
- La Casa de al Lado
- ¿Dónde está Elisa?
- Corazon Valiente
- Bajo el Mismo Cielo
- El Senor de los Cielos
- Senora Acero
- Duenos del Paraiso
- Mi Corazon Insiste en Lola Vulcan
- Los Miserables
- Tierra de Reyes
- El Rostro de la Venganza

=== MyNetworkTV ===
- Desire (TV series)
- Fashion House
- Wicked Wicked Games
- Watch Over Me
- American Heiress
- Saints & Sinners

== Uruguay ==
- Las novias de Travolta (2009)
- Dance! La Fuerza del Corazón (2011)
- Porque te quiero así (2012-2011)

== Venezuela ==
=== Venevisión ===
- Acorralada (2007)
- Adorable Monica (1991)
- Alba Marina (1988)
- Alma indomable (2008)
- Amantes de Luna Llena (2000)
- Amor Comprado (2007)
- Amor Del Bueno (2004)
- Amor Mío (1997)
- Amor secreto (2015)
- Amor Sin Fronteras (1992)
- Ángel rebelde (2004)
- Arroz con leche (2007)
- Aunque mal paguen (2007)
- Bellísima (1992)
- Bésame Tonto (2003)
- Buenos días, Isabel (1980)
- Calypso (1999)
- Cara Sucia (1992)
- Ciudad Bendita (2006)
- Como tú, ninguna (1994)
- Condesa por Amor (2008)
- Contra viento y marea (1997)
- Corazón apasionado (2012)
- Corazón esmeralda (2014)
- Cosita linda (2014)
- Cosita Rica (2004)
- Cuando Hay Pasion (1999)
- Cumbres Borrascosas (1976)
- De todas maneras Rosa (2013)
- Destino de Mujer (1997)
- Demente criminal (2014)
- Dulce Enemiga (1995)
- El amor las vuelve locas (2005)
- El árbol de Gabriel (2011)
- El Pais de las Mujeres (1998)
- El Talismán (2012)
- Engañada (2003)
- Entre tu amor y mi amor (2015)
- Eva Luna (2010)
- Gata Salvaje (2002)
- Guerra de mujeres (2001)
- Harina de otro costal (2010)
- Ka Ina (1995)
- Las Amazonas (1985)
- La cruz del diablo (1960)
- Las González (2002)
- La heredera (1982)
- La mujer de Lorenzo (2003)
- La mujer de mi vida (1998)
- La mujer perfecta (2010)
- La mujer prohibida (1972)
- La mujer prohibida (1991)
- La sombra de Piera (1989)
- La vida entera (2008–2009)
- La viuda joven (2011)
- La Zulianita (1977)
- Lejana como el viento (2001)
- Ligia Elena (1982)
- Ligia Sandoval (1981)
- Los Donatti (1986)
- Los misterios del amor (2009)
- Los secretos de Lucía (2014)
- Los Querendones (2005)
- Lucecita (1967)
- Maria Celeste (1994)
- María del Mar (1978)
- María Teresa (1972)
- Mariana de la Noche (1976)
- Más que amor, frenesí (2001)
- Morena Clara (1996)
- Mi ex me tiene ganas (2012)
- Muñeca de trapo (2000)
- Natalia del Mar (2011–2012)
- Pecado de Amor (1995)
- Pecadora (2009)
- Peregrina (1972)
- Pobre Millonaria (2008)
- ¡Qué clase de amor! (2009)
- Quirpa de Tres Mujeres (1996)
- Rebeca (2003)
- Rosario (2013)
- Sabor a ti (2004)
- Sacrificio de Mujer (2011)
- Salvador de Mujeres (2010)
- Samantha (telenovela) (1998)
- Secreto de Amor (2001)
- Se solicita príncipe azul (2005)
- Sol de Tentación (1996)
- Sorángel (1982)
- Toda Mujer (1999)
- Todo Sobre Camila (2002)
- Tomasa Tequiero (2009)
- Torrente (2008)
- Trópico (2007)
- Una muchacha llamada Milagros (1974)
- Un esposo para Estela (2009)
- Valeria (2008)
- Válgame Dios (2012)
- ¿Vieja yo? (2008)
- Voltea pa' que te enamores (2006–2007)
- Y la luna también (1987)

=== RCTV ===
- A Calzon Quitao (Without underwear)
- Abandonada (Neglected)
- Abigail 1988
- Adriana
- Alejandra
- Alma mia 1988
- Alondra
- Amanda Sabater
- Amantes (2005)
- Amor a Palos (Love to Friends)
- Amores de Barrio Adentro (Inner-City Lovers)
- Amores de Fin de Siglo (End-of-Century Lovers)
- Anabel (Anabel)
- Angelica Pecado (Holy Sin)
- Angelito (Little Angel)
- Ante la Ley (In front of the Law)
- Asi es la Vida (Life Is This Way)
- Atrévete (I Dare You To) 1986
- Aunque me Cueste la Vida
- Azucena
- Bienvenida Esperanza (A Welcomed Hope)
- Boves, El Urogallo (Boves, The Urogal)
- Camay (Cambay)
- Cambio de Piel (Change of Skin)
- Campeones (Champions)
- Canaima (Canaima)
- Cantare para Ti (I will Sing for you)
- Caribe (Caribbean Sea)
- Carissima (Charisma)
- Carita Pintada (Painted Face)
- Carmen Querida (Dear Carmen)
- Carolina (Carolina)
- Chao Cristina (See Ya, Christina)
- Chinita, mi amor (Dear Chinita)
- Cimarrón (Cimarron)
- Claudia (Claudia)
- Clemencia
- Cristal 1985
- Cristina
- Cuando el Cielo es Más Azul (When the sky is bluer than blue)
- De Mujeres
- De Oro Puro
- Detrás del Telón
- Divina Obsesión
- Doña Bárbara (1975)
- Dulce Ilusión
- El alma no tiene color (A Colorless Soul)
- El Castillo de Hierro
- El Derecho de Nacer
- El Desafío
- El Desprecio
- El Engaño
- El Esposo de Anaís
- El hombre de la máscara de hierro
- El País Perdido
- El Precio de Una Vida
- El Primer Milagro
- Elizabeth
- Emperatriz
- Enamorada
- Entrega total
- Esmeralda
- Estefania
- Estrambotica Anastasia
- Eva Marina
- Federrico
- Gardenia
- Hay Amores Que Matan (Killer Lovers)
- Historia de Tres Hermanas
- Hoy te Vi
- Ilusiones 1995
- Infigenia
- Juana la Virgen
- Jugando a Ganar
- Kapricho S.A.
- Kassandra
- Kiko Botones
- La Balandra Isabel llegó esta tarde (The sloop "Isabel" came this afternoon)
- La Comadre
- La Cruz de Palo
- La Cuaima (The Cuaima)
- La Dama de Rosa 1986
- La Doña Perfecta (The Perfect Housewife)
- La Dueña
- La Fiera
- La Goajirita
- La Hija de Juana Crespo
- La historia de un Canalla (A Coward's Story)
- La indomable (The Undefeated)
- La Inolvidable
- La Intrusa 1986
- La Invasora
- La italianita
- La Mujer de Judas ("Wife of Judas") 2002
- La Niña de mis ojos (My Beloved Girlfriend)
- La Novela de Pasion (Passion Is A Soap Opera)
- La Novela del Hogar (The Homemade Soap Opera)
- La Novela LM (LM, The Soap Opera)
- La Novela Romantica (A Romantic Soap Opera)
- La Pasion de Teresa 1989
- La Posada Maldita
- La Salvaje
- La Señora de Cárdenas (Mr. Cárdenas' Woman)
- La Señorita Elena
- La Señorita Perdomo
- La Soberana
- La Tirana
- La Trepadora
- La Única
- Las Bandidas
- Las Nuevas aventuras de Fredericco
- Leonela 1983
- Los Amores de Anita Peña
- Los Ojos que Vigilan (Spying Eyes)
- Luisa Fernanda 1998
- Luisana Mia
- Luz Marina
- Luz y sombras
- Mabel Valdez
- Mama Trompeta
- Maria de los Angeles
- Maria Jose, oficios del hogar
- Maria, Maria 1990
- Mariana Montiel
- Marielena
- Marisela
- Mariú 1999
- Marta y Javier 1983
- Mi amada Beatriz 1987
- Mi Gorda Bella
- Mi Hermano Satanas (My Satanic Brothers)
- Mi Hijo Gabriel (My Son Gabriel)
- Mi prima Ciela
- Mi Secreto me Condena
- Mis Tres Hermanas
- Mosquita Muerta
- Mujer con Pantalones
- Mujer Secreta
- Muñequita
- Natalia de 8 a 9
- Negra consentida
- Niña mimada (The Girl Who Copies People)
- Niño de Papel (The Paperboy)
- O.K.
- Palmolive
- Peregrina
- Piel de Zapa
- Pobre Negro (Poor Negro)
- Por Estas Calles
- Por Todo lo Alto
- Primavera
- Pura Sangre
- ¡Qué buena se puso Lola! (How Good Lola Has It!))
- Que Paso con Jacqueline? 1982
- Rafaela
- Raquel
- Reina de corazones 1998
- Renzo El Gitano
- Roberta 1987
- Rosa de la Calle 1982
- Rosángela (1979)
- Rubi Rebelde 1989
- Sabrina
- Selva, la Virgen de Barro
- Selva María 1987
- Señora 1988
- Ser bonita no basta
- Silvia Rivas, divorciada
- Sobre la Misma Tierra
- Soltera y sin Compromiso
- Sonia
- Su Mala Hora
- Tinieblas en el Corazón
- Topacio 1985
- Tormenta de Pasión
- Tormento
- Trapos Íntimos
- Tuya Para Siempre
- TV Confidencial
- Un Pedazo de Cielo
- Valentina
- Viva la Pepa (Pepa Rules!)
- Volver a Vivir
- Yo Compro a Esa mujer

=== Televen ===
- Dulce amargo (2012)

== See also ==
- List of soap operas
