= Cita con la muerte =

Mexican telenovela

- Genre: Telenovela
- Created by: Hugo Argüelles
- Starring: Jacqueline Andere; Rafael Banquells
- Country of origin: Mexico
- Original language: Spanish

Production
- Executive producer: Rafael Banquells

Original release
- Network: Telesistema Mexicano
- Release: 1963

Cita con la muerte is a Mexican telenovela produced by Televisa for Telesistema Mexicano in 1963.

== Cast ==
- Jacqueline Andere
- Ariadna Welter
- Rafael Banquells
- Luis Aragón
- Begoña Palacios
- Noé Murayama

== Other versions ==
- Pecado mortal - 1960 original version made in Mexico, starring Amparo Rivelles, Elsa Cárdenas and Osvaldo Calvo.
- La Indomable - First remake made in Venezuela in 1974, starring Marina Baura and Elio Rubens.
- La venganza - First remake made in Mexico in 1977, starring Helena Rojo and Enrique Lizalde.
- Rosa salvaje - 1987 remake made in Mexico, starring Verónica Castro and Guillermo Capetillo.
- Marimar - Second remake made in Mexico in 1994, starring Thalía and Eduardo Capetillo.
- Abrázame muy fuerte - 2000 remake made in Mexico, starring Victoria Ruffo, Aracely Arámbula, and Fernando Colunga.
- Gata salvaje - 2002 remake made in Venezuela, starring Marlene Favela and Mario Cimarro.
- Tormenta en el paraíso - - Third remake made in Mexico in 2007, starring Sara Maldonado and Erick Elías.
- MariMar - Third remake made in the Philippines in 2007 by GMA 7, starring Marian Rivera and Dingdong Dantes.
- Alma Indomable - Second remake made in Venezuela in 2010, starring Scarlet Ortiz and Jose Angel Llamas.
- Corazón indomable - Fourth remake made in Mexico in 2013, starring Ana Brenda Contreras and Daniel Arenas.
- Que te perdone Dios - 2015 remake made in Mexico, starring Rebecca Jones, Zuria Vega and Mark Tacher.
- MariMar - Fourth remake made in the Philippines in 2015 by GMA 7, starring Megan Young and Tom Rodriguez.
