= La usurpadora =

La usurpadora may refer to:

- La usurpadora (Venezuelan TV series), a 1971 Venezuelan telenovela starring Marina Baura and Raúl Amundaray.
- La usurpadora (1998 TV series), a 1998 Mexican telenovela starring Gaby Spanic and Fernando Colunga.
- La usurpadora (2019 TV series), a 2019 Mexican telenovela starring Sandra Echeverría and Arap Bethke.
- La Usurpadora: The Musical, a 2023 Mexican-American film starring Isabella Castillo and Alan Estrada.

== See also ==
- El hogar que yo robé, a 1981 Mexican remake of the series
- La intrusa (1986 TV series), a 1986 Venezuelan remake of the 1971 series
- ¿Quién eres tú?, a 2012 Mexican remake of the series
