= Pecado mortal =

Pecado mortal may refer to:

- Mortal Sin (film), a 1970 Brazilian drama film
- Pecado mortal (TV series), a 1960 Mexican telenovela
