= Emperatriz =

Emperatriz may refer to:

- Emperatriz (Mexican TV series), a 2011 telenovela
- Emperatriz (Venezuelan TV series), a 1990 telenovela
