= La indomable =

La indomable may refer to:

- La indomable (Mexican TV series), 1987
- La indomable (Venezuelan TV series), 1974
