= Marisela Berti =

Venezuelan actress, singer and beauty queen (1950–2024)

- Born: September 9, 1950; Maracaibo, Venezuela
- Died: October 30, 2024 (aged 74); Mexico City, Mexico
- Occupation(s): Television actress, show host, singer, beauty queen
- Spouses: Chucho Avellanet (divorced); Mauricio Walerstein (his death)
- Children: 2

Marisela Maritza Berti Diaz (September 9, 1950 – October 30, 2024) was a Venezuelan actress, singer, television show host and beauty queen. Her work in telenovelas and television talk shows made her well known in Latin America; she acted in Venezuela and the United States.

Berti was also well known in Puerto Rico, where she lived and worked on television for more than a decade.

== Miss Venezuela contest ==
Berti was Miss Zulia in 1971, representing her native state at the 1971 Miss Venezuela pageant. She ended up as the 4th runner-up at that contest.

== Career ==
Soon after her Miss Venezuela participation, Berti embarked on an acting career, signed by the television network, Radio Caracas Television. She had a small role in the telenovela La Usurpadora ("The Impostor"), which was a major international hit that has spawned several remakes. In 1972, Berti participated in Sacrificio de Mujer ("A Woman's Sacrifice") as Maula.

Berti participated in ten telenovelas, including Mi Amada Beatriz ("My Loved Beatriz") as well as La Indomable ("The Indomitable One"), Doña Bárbara ("Miss Barbara") where she played one of the main characters, Marisela Barquero, Señora ("Lady"), as Candela Benitez, and Dulce Ilusión ("Sweet Illusion"), as Zarina, among others. All of those were major hits in Latin America.

During the late 1970s and the 1980s, Berti took a hiatus in her career, as she married Puerto Rican singer Chucho Avellanet and moved to the Caribbean island-nation. She did, however, continue to appear on television from time to time.

In 1989, Berti returned to her native Venezuela for a period, to film the movie that marked her cinema acting debut, the Venezuelan film Cuchillos de Fuego ("Fire Knives"), in which she was one of the main stars, alongside Miguel Angel Anda and Gabriel Fernandez.

She also participated in 1990's Carmen Querida ("Dear Carmen"), where she acted in 166 episodes as the titular character, Carmen Luisa Mariani.

The last series that Berti appeared in before another periodical retirement was 1999's Las Profecias de Amanda ("Amanda's Prophecies"), before returning, 19 years later, in the international hit El Señor de los Cielos, as lawyer Edith Guzman. In El Señor De Los Cielos, Berti acted together with her son, Mexican actor Alex Walerstein.

== Personal life ==
Berti was married to Puerto Rican singer Chucho Avellanet, and gave birth to their son Luis Armando in 1981. She moved to Puerto Rico during that era.

She later lived with Mexican film director Mauricio Walerstein, and gave birth to their son, actor Alejandro Walerstein, in 1993. Berti and Walerstein were together until his death in 2016.

Following Walerstein's death, Berti battled depression, to the point of having suicidal thoughts, but she recuperated.

=== Illness and death ===
In January 2022, Berti suffered a stroke. She was in a coma for some time, but her health improved.

She died on October 30, 2024, in Mexico City, Mexico where she lived her last few years. She was 74 years old.

== See also ==
- List of Venezuelans
