= La venganza (1977 TV series) =

- Genre: Telenovela
- Created by: Inés Rodena
- Written by: Tere Medina
- Directed by: Rafael Banquells
- Starring: Helena Rojo; Enrique Lizalde; Beatriz Sheridan; Xavier Marc
- Country of origin: Mexico
- Original language: Spanish

Production
- Executive producer: Valentín Pimstein

Original release
- Network: Canal 2
- Release: February 25 – November 24, 1977

La venganza is a 1977 Mexican telenovela made by Televisa, produced by Valentin Pimstein and directed by Rafael Banquells, starring Helena Rojo and Enrique Lizalde. La venganza is a romantic heroine story, combining elements of Charles Perrault's Cinderella, George Bernard Shaw's Pygmalion and William Shakespeare's The Taming of the Shrew.

== Plot ==
María Olivares (Helena Rojo) is a beautiful but poor young provincial woman. Never having known her father and orphaned at a young age, she is raised by her maternal grandfather, Don Maximiliano (José Luis Jiménez). Her grandfather is a peasant farmer living in a hut on the grounds of his employers' land, a wealthy family, owners of Hacienda Narváez.

Javier Narvaez (Enrique Lizalde) is the handsome son and heir to half the Narvaez family fortune, who is visiting his brother Rafael (Javier Marc) and sister-in-law Carmen (Beatriz Sheridan). Javier is an independent young man and also a successful airline pilot. Rafael and Carmen meanwhile live on the hacienda and operate the family business, viewing Javier as a sort of prodigal son, undeserving of his share of the family wealth.

María meets and falls in love with Javier during his visit to the hacienda. María is captivated by Javier, who despite his wealth — and unlike his family — has a good soul and is unconcerned by social standings. Javier, in turn, falls in love with María, realizing that her nature is even more attractive than her physical beauty.

Carmen and Rafael are against the relationship because María is poor. Carmen constantly humiliates María, at one point throwing a bracelet into the mud and forcing María to retrieve it with her teeth. Later, Carmen sets María's house on fire, hoping to force her to move away. Tragically, María's grandfather dies when her home burns down. María realizes it was an intentional act and bitterly vows to take revenge against all the Narvaez. Meanwhile, Javier is unaware of Carmen's actions and believes María has left him.

Now homeless and pregnant, María escapes to Mexico City. She arrives at the home of Alexander Balsameda (Roberto Cañedo), a sick elderly man, where she takes a job as his caregiver. Balsameda offers her protection, not knowing that María is his long-lost daughter, yet he feels strangely drawn to her with fatherly concern. Once upon a time, Alexander had also been forced to give up true love by his wealthy hotelier family more concerned with social standing. Now, when that same fate is being repeated with María and after many years of searching for her, destiny has intervened to bring father and daughter together.

After a confused incident, the truth of María's heritage is discovered. Having lost her mother and grandfather, María realizes she still has family in this world. Unfortunately, Alexander soon dies from a heart attack, leaving María the Hotel of Santo Angelo.

Now an heiress, María takes on her rightful birth name, Alejandra Balsameda. She also proves to be a capable businesswoman managing her father's hotel and fortune. Alejandra manages the hotel and has to confront new obstacles when she discovers that her father's business associate, Dupré (Tony Carbajal) and his lover Andrea (Nelly Meden) are stealing from her.

With a new name, fine clothes, and wealth, few people recognize her from her past life. However, she still retains her hatred and desire for revenge. Now that she has inherited Alexander's wealth, María sees it as destiny's way to help her achieve her revenge on the Narvaez family.

Fate seems to set circumstances in María's (now Alejandra) favor to accomplish her revenge. To Alejandra's surprise, the airline has placed employees as permanent residents in her hotel: Javier Narváez, Eduardo (Raymundo Capetillo) and flight attendant Sonia (Marcela Rubiales). Later, at a hotel party, Alejandra encounters Javier. He is struck by her resemblance to María Olivares, but thinks he is mistaken because Alejandra is a refined and elegant woman.

At the party, the governor of San Angelo (Germán Robles) falls in love with Alejandra, while his daughter Lucy (Karina Duprez) becomes engaged to Javier. Alejandra's beauty also attracts a new arrival to San Angelo, the Sultan of Oman (Rogelio Guerra), who also falls madly in love with Alejandra. However, despite her wealth, refinement, and the interest of other men, Alejandra's desire for revenge continues to blind her to opportunities for happiness. Meanwhile, Rafael and his wife Carmen leave Hacienda Narváez to live in San Angelo.

Now that Alejandra has gotten restitution from Dupré and she is full owner of the hotel, Andrea becomes her employee, ally, and confidant. Alejandra begins to plan her revenge with Andrea's help. During a visit to the hotel, Rafael meets Andrea and falls in love with her. Andrea gets Rafael drunk and takes him to the hotel's casino every night.

Eventually, Rafael becomes addicted to gambling and alcohol, loses all his money, and Andrea — following Alejandra's orders — makes him sign an IOU with the Hacienda Narvaez as collateral, which he also loses. With Rafael's great debt to the hotel, Alejandra demands payment, otherwise she will take possession of Hacienda Narvaez.

When Carmen learns of her husband's predicament, she begs for mercy from Alejandra. Alejandra tells her to come to the hotel the following day, where she will give her back the IOU. Before Carmen arrives, Alejandra orders a mud pit built at the hotel and invites the governor, his daughter, and Javier as witnesses. When Carmen arrives, Alejandra tells her in front of everyone that she will give her the IOU and forgive the debt if Carmen picks up the document from the mud with her teeth. Desperate and crying, Carmen throws herself toward the pit. However, Alejandra reaches for the IOU and retrieves it before Carmen humiliates herself, explaining that she cannot be as cruel as Carmen had been with her years before. Now that her identity has been revealed, everyone realizes that María and Alejandra are one and the same.

Javier wants to reestablish his relationship with Alejandra, but she rejects him. Javier decides to marry Sofía (Luz Adriana), who owns the lands next to his property at Hacienda Narvaez. Alejandra, utilizing a middleman buyer (Estela Chacón), makes an offer to Rafael Narváez for the hacienda, which he accepts to avoid bankruptcy caused by his addictions. Carmen dies being run over by a car, Rafael becomes an alcoholic, and Alejandra returns as owner of Hacienda Narváez. Finally, Javier divorces Sofía, begs Alejandra's forgiveness, and they marry.

== Cast ==
- Helena Rojo as María Olivares / Alejandra Balmaseda (Marimar)
- Enrique Lizalde as Javier Narvaez (Sergio)
- José Luis Jimenez as Don Maximiliano Oliveres (Pancho)
- Azucena Rodríguez as Rosa
- Raymundo Capetillo as Eduardo (Arturo)
- Aurora Cortes as Santa
- Luz Adriana as Sofia (Inocencia)
- Nelly Meden as Andrea (Brenda)
- Beatriz Sheridan as Carmen Valentina Santibáñez de Narvaez (Angelica)
- Tony Carbajal as Dupre (Duarte)
- Javier Marc as Rafael Narvaez (Renato)
- Karina Duprez as Lucy (Antonieta)
- Patricia Davalos as Isabel (Isabel)
- Germán Robles as Gobernador de St Angelo (Fernando)
- Rogelio Guerra as Sultán de Omán (Rodolfo)
- René Muñoz as Mohamed
- Eugenia D'Asil as Esther
- Miguel Angel Ferriz as José Luis
- Roberto Cañedo as Don Alejandro Balmaseda (Gustavo)
- Héctor Gómez as Victor
- Laura Zapata as Violeta (Natalia)
- Odiseo Bichir as Caleta
- Héctor Cruz as Nazario
- Marcela Rubiales as Sonia
- Otto Sirgo as Alfonso del Olmo
- Magda Haller as Doña Clementina
- Rebeca Silva Graciela Bernardos as Daniela
- Jorge Fink as Padre Julian (Padre Porres)
- Gato the kitten as itself (Pulgoso the puppy)

== Other versions ==
- La Indomable - First original version made in Venezuela in 1974, starring Marina Baura and Elio Rubens.
- Rosa salvaje - 1987 remake made in Mexico, starring Verónica Castro and Guillermo Capetillo.
- Marimar - Second remake made in Mexico in 1994, starring Thalía and Eduardo Capetillo.
- Abrázame muy fuerte - 2000 remake made in Mexico, starring Victoria Ruffo, Aracely Arámbula, and Fernando Colunga.
- Gata salvaje - 2002 remake made in Venezuela, starring Marlene Favela and Mario Cimarro.
- MariMar - 2007 remake in the Philippines by GMA 7, starring Marian Rivera and Dingdong Dantes.
- Tormenta en el paraíso - Third remake made in Mexico in 2007, starring Sara Maldonado and Erick Elías.
- Alma Indomable - Third remake made in Venezuela in 2010, starring Scarlet Ortiz and Jose Angel Llamas.
- Corazón indomable - Fourth remake made in Mexico in 2013, starring Ana Brenda Contreras and Daniel Arenas.
- Que te perdone Dios - 2015 remake made in Mexico, starring Rebecca Jones, Zuria Vega and Mark Tacher.
- MariMar - Fourth remake made in the Philippines in 2015 by GMA 7, starring Megan Young and Tom Rodriguez.
