= Emperatriz (Venezuelan TV series) =

1990 Venezuelan television series

- Genre: Telenovela
- Created by: José Ignacio Cabrujas
- Written by: Carlos González Vega; Carolina Espada; José Ignacio Cabrujas
- Directed by: César Bolívar; Tony Rodríguez
- Starring: Marina Baura; Raúl Amundaray; Eduardo Serrano; Astrid Carolina Herrera
- Opening theme: Yo sin ti performed by Ricardo Montaner
- Original language: Spanish

Production
- Executive producer: Hernan Pérez Pereira
- Producers: Indira Vásquez; César Pérez
- Production locations: Caracas, Venezuela
- Camera setup: Multi-camera
- Production company: Marte TV

Original release
- Network: Venevisión
- Release: 1990 – 1990

Related
- Emperatriz (2011)

Emperatriz is a Venezuelan telenovela written by José Ignacio Cabrujas, produced by Marte Televisión and broadcast on Venevisión in 1990.

Marina Baura and Raúl Amundaray starred as the protagonists with Eduardo Serrano and Martín Lantigua as antagonists.

== Synopsis ==
Emperatriz Jurado is a young woman of humble origin, in love with Anselmo Lander, who marries Alma Rosa Corona, a woman rich in interest without knowing it. She and Anselmo have a daughter, Esther, but Anselmo takes her away to raise her in his marriage and takes her away from Emperatriz, whom the girl forgets. Esther grew up with her two half sisters, Endrina and Elena.

Anselmo sends Emperatriz to live in New York to hide her; but every time it makes him get less money. She becomes pregnant again by him; But the hardships she is going through make her lose the child, there she meets another Venezuelan loser named Leonidas Leon, and they plan to return together to Venezuela to rebuild their lives.

Willing to take revenge, Emperatriz involves Anselmo in a drug scandal, which is why his wife dies of a heart attack. Anselmo, between guilt and shame, commits suicide. Empress and her husband manage to ascend socially.

The three girls are left in charge of Don Justo Corona who is the uncle of Anselmo's deceased wife, it is this man who, devastated, takes hatred of the girls for being daughters of the man who made his niece suffer so much and decides to separate them, the middle daughter Endrina goes to live with Anselmo's sister, La Gata Barroso, Elena is adopted by some foreigners who give her the same name but in English Helen; and Esther (Nohely Arteaga) is sent to boarding school in England.

Some time later, Emperatriz discovers that her real father is Don Justo Corona, who hates her for what happened with Alma Rosa and wants revenge on her. As if that were not enough, another nephew of Justo, a high-ranking naval officer, falls in love with Alexander the Great.

The years go by Esther escapes from boarding school and becomes a prostitute, Endrina is raped by the husband of the barroso cat and has a son (José lost), who she does not want to see, her desire is to take revenge on the Empress, she goes to Caracas where she becomes a model, her name is changed and she becomes the Empress' exclusive model to destroy her and thus avenge the death of her parents, Helen returns to Venezuela she had blocked from her memory the memories as a child with her sisters, little by little. remembering everything.

Emperatriz manages to get Esther back and win her heart; but the girl falls in love with her stepfather and he reciprocates her, for which both feel guilt towards Empress.

Emperatriz is a continuing saga, which tells the story of undying love, passion, heinous crimes and, most of all, terrible vengeance. Emperatriz Jurado is a woman blinded by greed and a thirst for revenge. She seeks to ruin the wealthy and powerful Corona family but only destroys herself in the process. Emperatriz's vicious schemes drive her lover to suicide and cause the death of Alma Rosa Corona, his wife. Three orphaned daughters survive, who swear vengeance on their parent's death. One of the girls is really Emperatriz's child. Struggling to capture the Corona Fortune, Emperatriz develops a passion for another member of the Corona Family. As the secret unfold, revealing deception and the cruel truth, it affects all those involved in this stirring passionate drama.

== Cast ==
- Marina Baura as Emperatriz Jurado
- Raúl Amundaray as Alejandro Magno Corona
- Eduardo Serrano as Leonidas León
- Astrid Carolina Herrera as Endrina Lander/Eugenia Sandoval
- Nohely Arteaga as Esther Lander
- Aroldo Betancourt as Dr. Ricardo Montero
- Astrid Gruber as Elena Lander/Helen
- Elba Escobar as Estela "La Gata" Barroso
- Martin Lantigua as Justo Corona
- Gladys Caceres as Bertha Guaiquepuro
- Nury Flores as Perfecta Jurado
- Arturo Peniche as David León
- Pedro Lander as Mauricio Gómez
- Betty Ruth as Mamama
- Lino Ferrer as Cándido
- Fernando Flores as Manuel
- Alma Ingianni as Margot
- Eric Noriega as Urbano Guevara
- Luis Rivas as Napoleón
- Yajaira Paredes as Juana Velásquez
- Veronica Doza as Lola
- William Moreno as Benito Palermo
- Juan Carlos Gardie as Jaime Peraza
- Alberto de Mozos as Mauro
- Julio Pereira as Gonzalo Ustáriz
