= Carmen querida =

- Genre: Telenovela; Romance; Drama
- Created by: Alberto Barrera Tyszka
- Written by: Alberto Barrera Tyszka; Carolina Espada
- Directed by: Tony Rodríguez
- Starring: Marialejandra Martín; Carlos Montilla; Amalia Pérez Díaz
- Opening theme: Sabia nueva performed by Gonzalo Torres
- Country of origin: Venezuela
- Original language: Spanish
- No. of episodes: 167

Production
- Executive producer: Jorge Gherardi
- Producer: Daniel Andrade
- Production location: Caracas

Original release
- Network: RCTV
- Release: February 12 – November 25, 1990

Carmen querida is a Venezuelan telenovela written by Alberto Barrera Tyszka for RCTV and broadcast in 1990. The telenovela lasted 167 episodes and was distributed internationally by RCTV International.

Marialejandra Martín and Carlos Montilla starred as the main protagonists.

== Synopsis ==
Three related women share the same name. The telenovela follows them as they face broken romance and the real world without mates.

Carmen Teresa, the first, has a life transformed by compulsive love that leads to abandonment of her family, with daughter Carmen Luisa in her arms. She is unaware that as the years pass the story will be repeated through her daughter. However, she remains loyal, ready and willing to offer love and advice to Carmen Luisa.

Carmen Cecilia is raised under her mother's strong, willful influence after Carmen Luisa's torrid romance with a syndicate leader. As a mother, Carmen Luisa is incapable of preventing her daughter from committing the same youthful errors.

In spite of the constant adversities of the two women who are the center of her life, Carmen Cecilia gives all her attention to Arturo. Desperately dominated by family situations, he leaves her. The product of their love will, in time, prove to be Carmen Beatriz.

Three women, three generations, one history that could have ended differently if only one of them had fought for her first love - for the father of her Carmen.

== Cast ==
- Marialejandra Martín as Carmen Cecilia
- Carlos Montilla as Arturo
- Marisela Berti as Carmen Luisa
- Amalia Pérez Díaz as Carmen Teresa
- Miriam Ochoa as Melania Ramos
- Miguel Alcántara as Doctor Arcadio
- Lourdes Valera as Hiraida
- Vicente Tepedino as Padre Alberto
- Ana Karina Manco as Carolina Arcaya
- Carlos Villamizar as Elías Martucci
- Marcelo Romo as Don Fidelio
- Dalila Colombo as Doña Julia
- Irina Rodríguez as Daisy Josefina
- Jose Daniel Bort as Javierito
- Laura Brey as Alma Santeliz
