= Cristina Marcano =

Biographer of Hugo Chávez (born 1960)

Cristina Marcano (born 1960), is a biographer of former Venezuelan President Hugo Chávez. Along with Alberto Barrera Tyszka, she authored Hugo Chávez Sin Uniforme: Una Historia Personal, which was published in 2005 by Random House Mondadori (ISBN 980-293-284-1).
