= La comadre =

La Comadre is a 1981 Venezuelan telenovela that was produced by and seen on Venezuela's Radio Caracas Televisión. It was written by Juan Carlos Genet and Román Chalbaud. This telenovela lasted only 16 episodes and was distributed internationally by Coral International.

== Synopsis ==
Aurora is a teenager, growing up in the '20s, in the mountain town of Mérida. At the time, tyrant Juan Vicente Gómez rules Venezuela. Aurora's uncle is part of an underground movement that opposes Gómez. He is arrested and imprisoned in the infamous Morro prison, where he is constantly tortured. During this time, Magdalena Trejo, Aurora's comadre (Magdalena is the godmother of Aurora's doll) comes to live with her and her family. Magdalena's life has been haunted by her male relatives, the Trejos, a bunch of bullies who had driven the girl's mother to an early death. Although Aurora is warned by her comadre, she falls in love with Manuel Trejo, Magdalena's uncle. Manuel is a philanderer, who uses women. Knowing he can't have Aurora unless he marries her, he asks for her hand in marriage and hurries back to his native Maracaibo. Aurora marries Manuel by proxy, and then starts alone to Maracaibo, on the first trip she's ever taken outside of Mérida. Although Aurora is a naive girl, she soon realizes her marriage is a fiasco. Not only does Manuel prove to be a brutal lover, but he pays little attention to his wife and carries on an affair openly with his servant. When Magdalena, who is on her way to Curaçao to join her revolutionary boyfriend, stops in Maracaibo to visit, Aurora is thrilled. Magdalena leaves, and Aurora finds out she is going to have a baby. She decides to hide this from her husband. One day, while going through her husband's things, she finds a box of old letters. In those letters, Manuel describes explicitly all his sexual affairs. When Manuel finds out that Aurora is pregnant, he accuses her of hiding the truth because the child is not his. He sends Aurora back to Mérida where her family and neighbors ostracize her. After the birth of her son, Rodolfo, Aurora decides to go to Caracas to start a new life.

== Cast ==
- Doris Wells as Aurora
- Cecilia Villarreal as Magdalena
- Miguel Ángel Landa as Manuel
- Carlos Márquez as Esteban
- Pedro Lander as Rodolfo

== See also ==
- List of famous telenovelas
