= Doña Bárbara (1975 TV series) =

- Genre: Telenovela
- Based on: Doña Bárbara by Rómulo Gallegos
- Written by: José Ignacio Cabrujas
- Directed by: Juan Lamata
- Starring: Marina Baura
- Opening theme: Doña Bárbara by El carrao del Palmarito
- Country of origin: Venezuela
- Original language: Spanish

Production
- Cinematography: César Bolívar
- Editor: Carlos Ramirez

Original release
- Network: RCTV
- Release: 1974 – 1975

Related
- Doña Bárbara

Doña Bárbara is a Venezuelan telenovela written by José Ignacio Cabrujas and produced by RCTV in 1974. It is based on the 1929 novel of the same name written by Rómulo Gallegos.

Marina Baura starred as the titular character with Elio Rubens as Santos, Marisela Berti as Marisela and Carlos Marquez as Balbino.

== Cast ==
- Marina Baura as Doña Bárbara
- Elio Rubens as Santos Luzardo
- Marisela Berti as Marisela Barquero
- Rafael Briceño as Lorenzo Barquero
- Carlos Marquez as Balbino Paiba
- Tomás Henríquez as Melquíades "El Brujeador"
- Juan Fava as El Socio
- Edmundo Valdemar as Ño Pernalete
- Enrique Benshimol as Mr. Danger
- Arturo Calderón as Juan Primito
- Guillermo González as Bachiller Mujiquita
- Martha Olivo as Casilda
- César Lemoine as Asdrúbal
- Mauricio González as Antonio Sandoval
- William Moreno as Carmelito
- Carlos Flores as Melesio
- Gustavo Rodríguez as María Nieves
