= El Show de Renny =

Venezuelan variety show

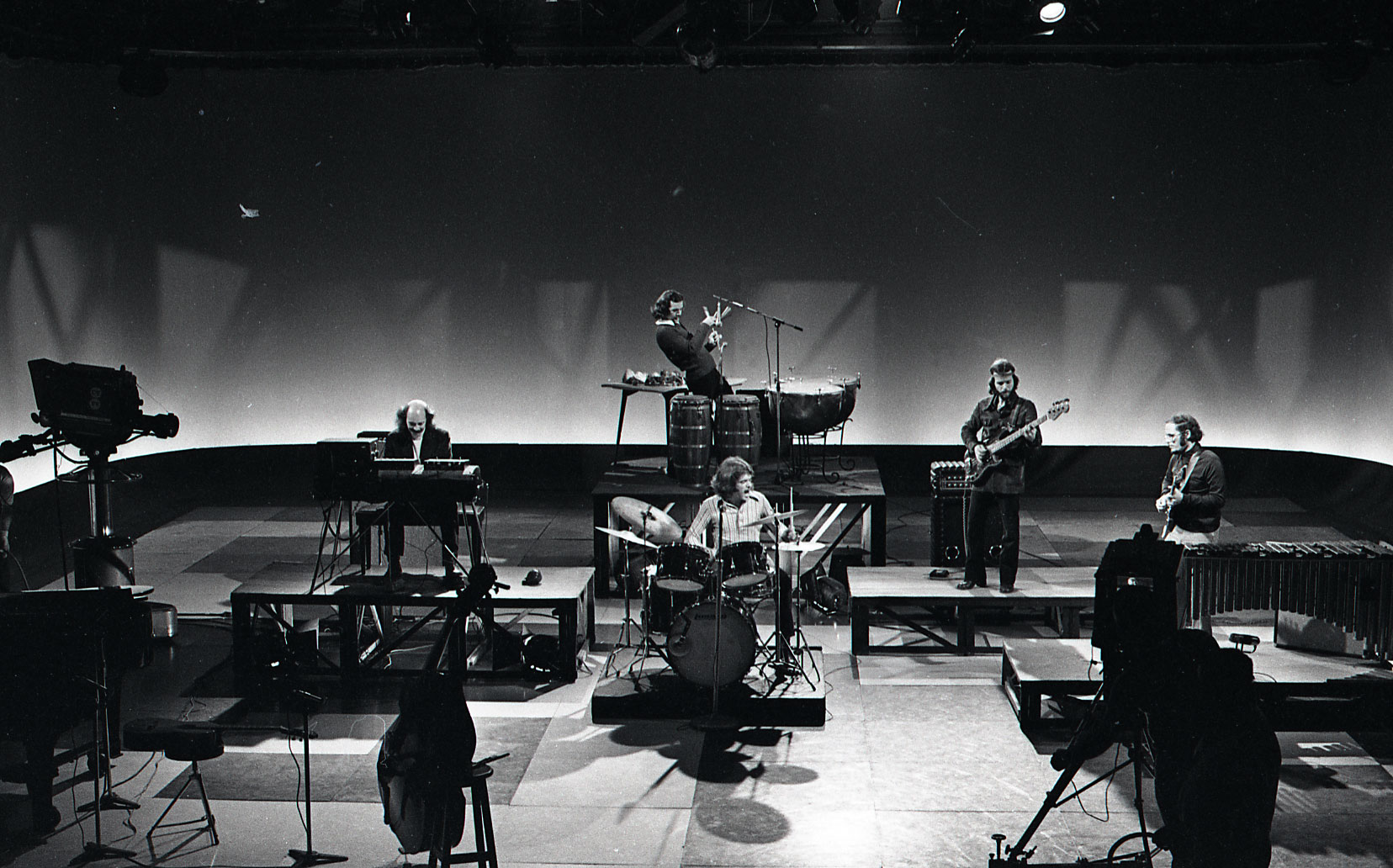

El Show de Renny (The Renny Show) was a Venezuelan variety show hosted by Renny Ottolina that aired from 1958 to 1971 on Radio Caracas Televisión (RCTV). Ottolina also wrote and produced the show, becoming one of the first independent television producers in Venezuela.

The show featured Las Chicas de Renny (The Girls of Renny). They included Julia Pérez (later known as Marina Baura), Maria Padron de Leon, Maria Gracia Bianchi, Ingrid Bolaw (later Ingrid Garbo), Gudelia Castillo, Liduvina Ramírez, the twins Jeanette and Zayda Garcia, and Elizabeth Flores Gil.

Ottolina hired foreign choreographers including Sandra Le Brocc and Jim Huntley, and famous Latin American presenters Paula Bellini and Susana Duijm.

Ottolina had a pattern of hosting El Show de Renny for two years, and take a year off, spending that time in another country before returning to the show. Due to this, there were interruptions to the show between the years 1959 and 1961, 1962 and 1964, and 1965 and 1967.

While on one of his breaks in 1960, Ottolina hosted an English language program on the New York City television station WABC-TV. When he returned to Venezuela in 1961, he introduced the sketches format to his show.

On February 3, 1965, Ottolina began hosting another show on RCTV called Renny Presenta... (Renny Presents...). Renny Presenta... mostly featured music and was co-hosted by Ivan Valdez. In 1970, this show was moved to Cadena Venezolana de Television (CVTV).

In 1971, El Show de Renny aired for the last time and Ottolina left RCTV. Most of the show's recordings were lost in a 1978 fire.

El Show de Renny became one of the most remembered television shows in Venezuela and gave Ottolina fame and prestige.
