= Natalia de 8 a 9 =

- Genre: Telenovela
- Created by: José Ignacio Cabrujas
- Written by: José Ignacio Cabrujas; Ligia Lezama; Fausto Verdial
- Directed by: César Bolívar
- Starring: Marina Baura; Gustavo Rodríguez; María Conchita Alonso
- Opening theme: Natalia perdóname by Hugo Carregal
- Country of origin: Venezuela
- Original language: Spanish
- No. of episodes: 60

Production
- Producer: César Bolívar
- Editor: Bruno Bianchini

Original release
- Network: Radio Caracas Television
- Release: April 12 – August 7, 1980

Natalia de 8 a 9 is a Venezuelan telenovela written by José Ignacio Cabrujas and produced by RCTV in 1980. The telenovela was success during its broadcast due to its realistic portrayal of an everyday Venezuelan couple and a break from the common telenovela rosa format used in many telenovelas at the time.

Marina Baura and Gustavo Rodríguez starred as the main protagonists.

== Plot ==
Natalia and Juan Carlos are a married couple whose life has been reduced to routine and the hectic pace of life, and they only get to spend time with each other every from 8 to 9 in the morning in between breakfast. Natalia struggles to hold on to her crumbling marriage while Juan Carlos surrenders to the possibility of a new love with Mariana, a young beautiful student at the college where he teaches. Once Natalia discovers his infidelity, her world crumbles around her. She discovers her teenage daughter is using contraceptives and is no longer a virgin and escapes at night to engage in secret bets. In their divorce, Juan Carlos threatens Natalia with taking away the kids to live with him. Natalia decides to rebuild her life away from her misery, and begins cooking food for delivery to restaurants in the city, and this way, she builds her reputation as a chef. At the same time, Mariana abandons Juan Carlos, and again, he begins an affair with Natalia's best friend. When she discovers the truth, Natalia realises that the people around her are worthless. All these events will just go to show Juan Carlos that Natalia is the love of his life, but it may be too late for him. Natalia will challenge her principles to discover she deserves more than crumbs of love in her life.

== Cast ==
- Marina Baura as Natalia
- Gustavo Rodríguez as Juan Carlos
- María Conchita Alonso as Mariana
- Carlos Olivier
- Rafael Briceño
- Cecilia Villarreal
- Tatiana Capote
- Guillermo Dávila
- Julio Jung
- Mahuampi Acosta
- Irma Palmieri
- Linda Olivier
- Jessika Arvelo
- Loly Sánchez
