= La italianita =

- Created by: Inés Rodena
- Written by: Ana Mercedes Escámez
- Screenplay by: Ana Mercedes Escámez
- Directed by: Juan Lamata
- Starring: Marina Baura; Elio Rubens
- Country of origin: Venezuela
- Original language: Spanish
- No. of episodes: 55

Original release
- Network: Radio Caracas Televisión
- Release: March 10 – April 28, 1973

Related
- Rina (1977); Yo no creo en los hombres (1991); María Mercedes (1992); Maria Mercedes (2013); Yo no creo en los hombres (2014)

La italianita is a Venezuelan telenovela created by Inés Rodena and adapted by Ana Mercedes Escámez for Radio Caracas Televisión in 1974. This was the first adaptation that made the original story of Inés Rodena. Marina Baura and Elio Rubens star as the main protagonists.

== Cast ==
Actor	Character
Marina Baura	Rina
Elio Rubens	Carlos Augusto
Amalia Pérez Díaz	
América Barrio	
Wendy Torres	
Edmundo Valdemar	
Marisela Berti	
María Antonieta Gómez	
Humberto Tancredi	
Carlos Olivier	
Alberto Marín	
Violeta González	
Luis Calderón	
Helianta Cruz	
Agustina Martín	
