= Lady in Rose =

1986 Venezuelan telenovela

- La dama de rosa
- Genre: Telenovela; Romance; Drama
- Created by: José Ignacio Cabrujas
- Directed by: Tito Rojas
- Starring: Jeannette Rodriguez Carlos Mata
- Opening theme: Sólo importas tú by Franco de Vita
- Country of origin: Venezuela
- Original language: Spanish
- No. of episodes: 144

Production
- Executive producer: Daniel Farías
- Cinematography: Enrique Ferrandiz
- Editor: Enrique Martínez
- Running time: 45 minutes
- Production company: RCTV

Original release
- Network: RCTV
- Release: November 3, 1986 – April 5, 1987

Related
- La intrusa; Mi amada Beatriz; Cambio de piel (1998)

La dama de rosa (English title: The lady of the rose) is a Venezuelan telenovela written by José Ignacio Cabrujas and produced by Radio Caracas Televisión in 1986. This telenovela lasted 144 episodes and it achieved a significant amount of success inside and outside Venezuela. It was distributed internationally by RCTV International.

Jeannette Rodríguez and Carlos Mata starred as the main protagonists. La dama de rosa was remade by RCTV in 1997 under the name Cambio de Piel.

== Synopsis ==
Gabriela Suárez, a theater student and cheerleader for a basketball team begins a job at a carwash in order to help out her family - her father has just died and she is the eldest of her siblings. The carwash is owned by a famous businessman, Tito Clemente, who will meet Gabriela and have a short but passionate affair with her. Gabriela, however, is falsely accused of drug trafficking and ends up in jail, with a 15-year sentence. Tito abandons her due to her bad luck, choosing to ignore the fact that she is expecting his child. In jail, Gabriela plots her escape, something she pulls off after having served seven years behind bars. Only one objective drives her existence: revenge against the man who ruined her life, Tito Clemente. To achieve her purpose, she changes her name and her physical appearance and manages to reintroduce herself into the life of Tito, making him fall in love with her all over again.

== Cast ==
- Jeannette Rodríguez as Gabriela Suárez (alias Emperatriz Ferrer)
- Carlos Mata as Tito Clemente
- Miguel Alcantara as David Rangel
- Jaime Araque as Nelson Suárez
- Guy Ecker as Simon Suárez
- Gisvel Ascanio as Elsa
- Haydee Balza as Carmen
- Xavier Bracho as José Antonio Clemente (child)
- Gladys Caceres as Mercedes Olvido Rangel
- Fernando Carrillo as Jose Luis
- Dalila Colombo as Leyla Kebil
- Helianta Cruz as Margot
- Guillermo Ferran as Martin Clemente
- Juan Frankis as Eloy González
- Humberto Garcia as Asdrúbal
- Zulay Lopez as Grecia
- Felix Loreto as Aníbal Ortega
- Alberto Marin as Comisario
- Jonathan Montenegro as Diego Suárez
- Amalia Perez Diaz as Lucia Suárez
- Victoria Roberts as Julia Suárez
- Irina Rodríguez as María Fernanda
- Francis Romero as Sonia
- Marcelo Romo as Joaquín Mendoza
- Eniz Santos as Nelly
- Carlota Sosa as Amparo
- Carlos Villamizar as Benavides
- Gigi Zanchetta as Eleonora
