= Alguém Perdeu =

Portuguese telenovela

- Starring: Anabela Teixeira; António Pedro Cerdeira; Mafalda Luís de Castro
- Country of origin: Portugal
- Original language: Portuguese
- No. of episodes: 82

Production
- Production company: SP Televisão

Original release
- Network: SIC
- Release: 18 March 2019 – 24 October 2029

Alguém Perdeu is a Portuguese telenovela which began airing on CMTV on March 18, 2019, and ended on October 24, 2019.

Its main actors were Mafalda Luís de Castro, Anabela Teixeira, António Pedro Cerdeira and Nuno Janeiro.

== Plot ==
Madalena, a rich and powerful businesswoman, felt guilty for the death of her only grandson, which occurred by mistake at the pool of the family's home when the child was at her control. His death caused Leonor, Madalena's only daughter, to enter into a spiral of destruction and madness, putting her career at risk, as well as her marriage with ambitious Bruno. Leono's pain is even larger due to the fact that she cannot have more children.

Seeing his daughter's loss, and with the help of his husband, Rodrigo,

Vendo a filha perder-se, e com o apoio do marido, Rodrigo, Leonor's stepfather, Madalena proposes her daughter to use her belly to create another child. But this mother-to-daughter gestation replacement ends up being from an unexpected monstrosity.

Written by António Bandeira, the telenovela tackled marginality, drug consumption, repressive homosexuality and luxury prostitution.

== Cast ==
Actor/Actress	Characters
Anabela Teixeira	Madalena Mascarenhas
Mafalda Luís de Castro	Leonor Mascarenhas Junqueira
António Pedro Cerdeira	Rodrigo Sarmento
Nuno Janeiro	Bruno Junqueira
Almeno Gonçalves	Eduardo Sarmento
Rafaela Covas	Bárbara Nogueira Sarmento
Filipa Pinto	Mariana Nogueira Sarmento
Francisco Fernandez	Miguel Nogueira Sarmento
Ana Catarina Afonso	Magda Sarmento
Luciano Gomes	Tiago Moreira
Diogo Costa Reis	Ricardo Santos
Gonçalo Botelho	José António Santos (Zeca Pedra)
Marta Peneda	Isa Santos
Joana Alvarenga	Vanda Ventura
Jacira Araújo	Anabela Ventura (Belinha)
Catarina Avelar	Quitéria de Jesus do Espírito Santo
Sabri Lucas	Baltazar de Jesus
Pedro Rodil	Luís Carlos Brandão
João Mota	Sérgio Bomba
José Martins	Leonel Piçarra
Joaquim Nicolau	Júlio
Ricardo Trêpa	Gusmão de Andrade
Rui de Sá	Francisco António (Chico Toy)
Maria Simões	Arminda
Nina Névoa	
Samanta Castilho	Alexa
Maria Faleiro	Idalina

=== Child cast ===
Actor/Actress	Characters
Francisca Salgado	Luísa Sarmento

=== Supporting cast ===
Actor/Actress	Characters
Guilherme Ferreira	João Vicente
Jorge Silva	Dr. Gouveia
Nuno Guerreiro	Dr. Aníbal Tavares
Maria José Baião	Amiga de Quitéria
Manuel Rodrigues	Chefe Cardoso
Joaquim Guerreiro	Man who tries to seduce Eduardo

== Production ==
Pre-production began in mid-September 2018 under the tentative name Pecados Capitais, signing up Sofia Arruda, Lupe Romero and Almeno Gonçalves as its first actors. The name Alguém Perdeu was announced on September 25, 2018, at the newspaper's Sexy 20 gala. For this end, CMTV hired SP Televisão to produce and António Bandeira to write the telenovela, which was part of the channel's strategic plan for 2019.

A special event was held on February 26, 2019, in Forte da Cruz, Cascais, airing on CMTV, where it was also revealed that it would premiere on March 18 during primetime. It was also revealed that, by watching Alguém Perdeu, its viewers would leave competing channels; CMTV had also signed a contract with SP to produce a second telenovela. Elements of its team, including some actors, watched the first episode at a special screening the day before its premiere.

The first episode had 1,6% rating and 3,3% share, attracting at least 166,000 viewers. Ratings were lower than the average for the 8pm edition of CM Jornal. On May 15, the channel decided to halt all filming and fired all 150 staff, leaving only 82 out of the planned 200 episodes broadcast, due to declining ratings and a constantly changing timeslot. What remained of the telenovela continued to be seen until the episodes in stock ran out.
