= Virginia Manzano =

Mexican actress (1912–1985)

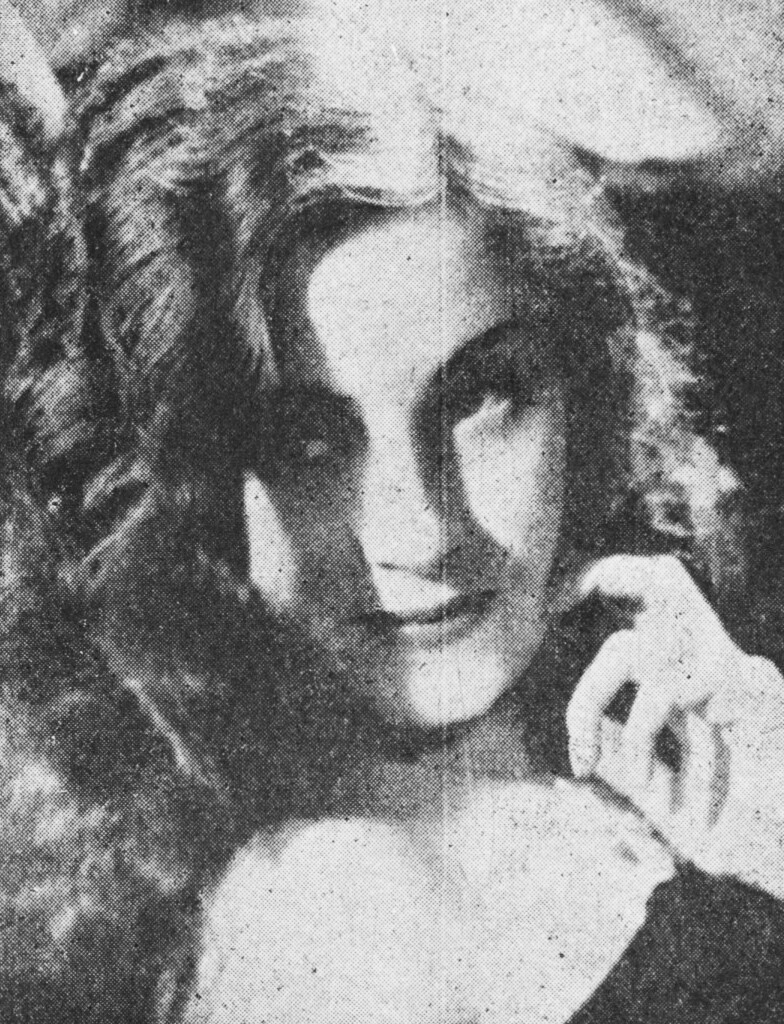
- Virginia Manzano in 1945
- Born: 24 November 1912; Guadalajara, Mexico
- Died: 18 February 1985 (aged 73); Mexico City, Mexico
- Occupation: Actress
- Years active: 1941 - 1981 (film)

Virginia Manzano (November 24, 1912 – February 18, 1985) was a Mexican film actress.

== Selected filmography ==
- Les Misérables (1943)
- The Eternal Secret (1942)
- The Rock of Souls (1943)
- María Eugenia (1943)
- The Two Orphans (1944)
- Mischievous Susana (1945)
- Sister Alegría (1952)

== Bibliography ==
- Pitts, Michael R. Western Movies: A Guide to 5,105 Feature Films. McFarland, 2012.
