= Dulce Ilusión =

- Genre: Telenovela; Romance; Drama
- Created by: Mariela Romero
- Written by: Mariela Romero; Freddy S. Hernández; Edgar Mejías; Valentina Saa; Carlos Dávila
- Directed by: Reinaldo Lancaster; Otto Rodríguez
- Starring: Coraima Torres; Gabriel Fernández; Marisela Berti; Félix Loreto
- Opening theme: Suena a rumba by Sergio Pérez
- Country of origin: Venezuela
- Original language: Spanish
- No. of episodes: 198

Production
- Producer: Hernando Faría
- Production locations: Viña del Mar, Chile
- Production company: RCTV

Original release
- Network: RCTV
- Release: May 12, 1993 – February 8, 1994

Dulce Ilusión (English title:Sweet Illusion) is a Venezuelan telenovela written by Mariela Romero and produced by Radio Caracas Televisión in 1993. This was the first telenovela to use Venezuelan cartoons with real people, and it's the only one in the history of Venezuelan soap operas, and the great success of the telenovela was partly due to the big innovation of the cartoons. The animated characters were developed by the legendary animator Felix Nakamura and his team.

Coraima Torres and Gabriel Fernández starred as the main protagonists with the antagonistic participation of Marisela Berti.

== Synopsis ==
Dulce María was born in the midst of the tropics, and when her parents die, she becomes the heiress to their lands and vast fortune. However, her ruthless governess Zarina robs her of her rightful inheritance and raises Dulce María as a servant in her own home, convincing her that she had been born a penniless orphan.

Despite her stepmother's cruelty, Dulce María grows to become a young woman full of optimism and innocence. Her genuine nature wins the hearts of many of the townspeople, especially the local children. Among these is Caraotica, an unforgettable boy with strange powers; in reality, Caraotica is an angel who inadvertently "fell" into the convent's backyard while on a mission from heaven to Villa del Mar. Sor Ada, the nun who educated Dulce María, becomes her confidante and greatest source of moral support. In her youth, Sor Ada had experienced everything from hunting tigers in the wild to singing classic love ballads, and thus instills in Dulce María a pronounced idealism and zest for life. It is through this that Dulce María becomes a dreamer; a young girl who shares her dreams and adventures with imaginary characters: a lively lizard named Homero, symbol of emotion; the toucan Prometeo symbol of reason; and the coquettish canary Alicia Josefina, symbol of love. One day, Dulce María is reunited with her childhood sweetheart Juan Francisco, a recently graduated military cadet. This marks the beginning of a passionate love story; one which will be threatened by envy, jealousy, and blind ambition. However, with the help of Jacques Delfin, a mysterious and eccentric man who lives on a yacht off the coast of Villa del Mar, Dulce María and Juan Francisco will finally unravel the secret of her birthright and find true love.

== Cast ==
- Coraima Torres as Dulce María
- Gabriel Fernandez as Juan Francisco Corona
- Carlos Arreaza as El Junior
- Janin Barboza as Sor Angustia
- Marisela Berti as Zarina
- Ricardo Bianchi as Gustavo Ríos Ibáñez
- Jose Daniel Bort as Andy Perez Matos
- Marcos Campos as Arturo Tracala
- Crisol Carabal as Sarita
- Sebastian Falco as Giuseppe
- Felix Loreto as Justo Corona
- Dora Mazzone as Egleé Bustillo
- Jonathan Montenegro as Lalo
- Martha Pabón as Marquesita
- Jorge Palacios as Don Tomás
- Henry Soto as Jacques Delfín
- Raul Gonzales Voice of Lizard Homero
