= Alberto Barrera Tyszka =

Venezuelan writer

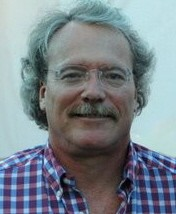
- Barrera Tyszka 2011
- Born: 18 February 1960 (age 66); Caracas
- Occupations: author and teacher
- Writing career
- Notable work: The Sickness (2006)

Signature
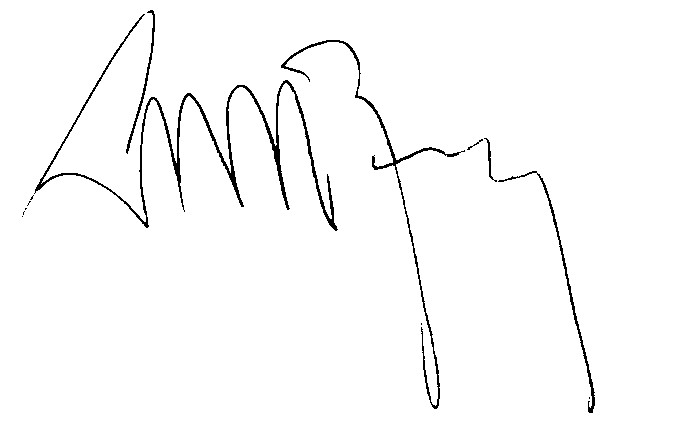

Alberto José Barrera Tyszka (born 18 February 1960) is a Venezuelan writer. In 2006, he received the Herralde Prize for his novel La enfermedad ("The Sickness").

== Life and career ==
Barrera Tyszka was born in Caracas, and grew up in Venezuela. He graduated from the Central University of Venezuela, where he is now a professor in the Department of Literature. In the 1980s, he participated in the poetry movements Tráfico and Guaire. His collaborations have appeared in diverse anthologies and publications from Spain, Mexico, Argentina, Cuba, and Venezuela. He is a regular columnist (since 1996) for the daily newspaper El Nacional, and a regular contributor to the magazine Letras Libres. He has written telenovela screenplays in Argentina, Colombia, Mexico, and Venezuela.

He has published four novels, a poetry collection, and three books of history, including Hugo Chávez sin uniforme: una historia personal (2005), the first biography of the late Venezuelan president Hugo Chávez (co-authored with journalist Cristina Marcano). His literary influences include Fedor Dostoyevski, Alexandre Dumas, Robert Louis Stevenson, Anton Chekhov, César Vallejo, Salvador Garmendia, and José Ignacio Cabrujas. In 2015 his novel Patria o muerte ("The Last Days of El Comandante") about Venezuelan leader Hugo Chávez and his battle with cancer between 2011 and 2013, won the XI Premio Tusquets de Novela.

Barrera's works have been translated into Mandarin, Portuguese, French, English, and Italian.

== List of works ==
Novels

- También el corazón es un descuido (2001). Mexico: Plaza & Janés.
- La enfermedad (2006). Barcelona: Anagrama.
  - Published in English as The Sickness (2010). London: Quercus. Translated by Margaret Jull Costa.
- Rating (2011). Barcelona: Anagrama.
- Patria o muerte (2015). Barcelona: Tusquets.
  - Published as The Last Days of El Comandante (2020). Austin: University of Texas Press. Translated by Rosalind Harvey and Jesse Mendez Sayer.
- Mujeres que matan (2019). Barcelona : Literatura Random House

Collections of short stories

- Edición de lujo (1990). Fundarte.
- Perros (2006). Camelia Ediciones.
- Crímenes (2009). Barcelona: Anagrama.

Poetry

- Amor que por demás (1985)
- Coyote de ventanas (1993) Monte Ávila Editores
- Tal vez el frío (2000) Pequeña Venecia
- La inquietud. Anthology (1985-2012) (2013) Lugar Común

Non-fiction

- Hugo Chávez sin uniforme: una historia personal (2005) Madrid: Debate.
- Alta Traición (chronicles) (2008) Caracas: Debate.
- Un país a la semana (chronicles) (2013) Caracas: El Nacional Books.

Telenovelas

- Amanda Sabater (1989). Radio Caracas Televisión
- Aunque mal paguen (2007). Venevision
- Los misterios del amor (2009). Venevision
- El árbol de Gabriel (2011). Venevision
