= El hogar que yo robé =

Mexican telenovela

- Genre: Telenovela
- Created by: Inés Rodena; Valeria Phillips
- Written by: Carlos Romero
- Directed by: Manolo Garcia
- Starring: Angélica María; Juan Ferrara; Angélica Vale; Angélica Aragón; Socorro Bonilla; Aldo Monti; Virginia Manzano
- Opening theme: El hogar que yo robé
- Country of origin: Mexico
- Original language: Spanish
- No. of episodes: 105

Production
- Executive producer: Valentín Pimstein
- Cinematography: Manuel Ruiz Esparza; Noé Alcántara
- Running time: 21-22 minutes
- Production company: Televisa

Original release
- Network: Canal de las Estrellas
- Release: February 16 – July 10, 1981

Related
- La usurpadora (1971); La intrusa (1986); La usurpadora (1998) ¿Quién eres tú? (2012)

El hogar que yo robé (English title: The Home I Robbed) is a Mexican telenovela produced by Valentín Pimstein for Canal de las Estrellas in 1981.

Angélica María starred has dual role as protagonist/antagonist, Juan Ferrara starred as protagonist, while Angélica Aragón starred as antagonist. Virginia Manzano, Aldo Monti and Socorro Bonilla starred as stellar performances.

== Plot ==
Andrea Velarde is a young married woman who cheats on her husband, she is traveling in a tourist place with Eduardo, a young gigolo and rake. Visiting a casino and after dinner, Andrea goes to touch up her makeup in the restroom, also feeling bad about something she ate, then suddenly her face is reflected in the mirror, but the image is not hers, but of another woman, surprised she discover Victoria the humble girl in charge of the vanity, also surprised by the resemblance to the rich and sophisticated woman.

Andrea conceives an idea to keep enjoying her freedom, offering Victoria money to impersonate her since they are identical and no one will notice the change. Go to the house where she lives with her husband and spend some time enjoying a life of luxuries, while Andrea travels with her lover. Horrified Victoria refuses, she tells Andrea she could not be with an unknown man. Andrea laughs saying there is no need for marital life that she can deceive her husband saying she is sick and can not have sex, that he is very understanding and won't force her.

Andrea dresses and does Victoria's hair and makes her appear before Eduardo, who does not notice that he is before another woman. That tells Andrea that her plan will succeed. She tells Victoria that she lives in a mansion with her husband Carlos Valentin, the two small children of his first marriage, his mother Doña Amanda and his siblings, Luis Felipe and Genoveva. To force Victoria's hand, Andrea accuses Victoria of stealing her diamond bracelet. With no way out Victoria agrees to Andrea's plan and goes to her home. There she starts to unravel the mess that Andrea has left behind. Victoria will help the family and the family business. Andrea will keep on been the selfish, perverted creature she has always been.

== Cast ==
- Angélica María as Victoria Valdéz Roldán/Andrea Montomayor de Velarde
- Juan Ferrara as Carlos Valentín Velarde
- Gregorio Casal as Reynaldo
- Virginia Manzano as Amanda Velarde
- Angélica Aragón as Genoveva Velarde
- Aldo Monti as Luis Felipe Velarde
- Leonardo Daniel as Eduardo
- René García as Carlitos Velarde
- Maritza Olivares as Florita
- María Clara Zurita as Teresa
- Angélica Vale as Aurorita Velarde
- Martha Verduzco as Virginia
- Carmen Belén Richardson as Fernanda
- Tere Mondragón as Juana
- Luis Couturier as Silvestre Soler
- Arturo Guízar as Isidoro
- Arturo Lorca as Cabrera
- Socorro Bonilla as Diana
- Luciano Hernández de la Vega as Ballesteros
- Mauricio Ferrari as Luigi
- Eugenio Cobo as Karim Saud
- Sanicte Maldonado as Aixa
- Felicia Mercado as Flor
- Lili Inclán as Crisanta
- Mónica Prado as Verónica
- Ada Carrasco as La Coronela
- Lola Tinoco as Rosarito
- Marina Dorell as Marilola
- Violet Gabriel
- Saby Kamalich as Jimena Fuentes
- Xavier Marc as Adrián Montemayor
- Arturo García Tenorio as Salomon
- Edith González as Paulina
- Alejandro Tommasi as Daniel
- Alma Delfina as Carmita
- Leticia Perdigón
- Fernando Borges as Tte.Sagredo
- Celeste Sáenz as Odalisque Ballarina
- Armando Calvo as Gaspar Garay
- Eduardo Yáñez as Barman
- Jacarandá Alfaro as Odalisque
- Estela Correa as Deren, Odalisque
- Héctor Cruz as Commissar Rivarola
- Rebeca Rambal as Mariquita
- Félix Santaella as Doctor
- Alfonso Iturralde as Lisandro/Rodrigo Montemayor
- Beatriz Aguirre as Janina
- Socorro Avelar
- Alberto Gavira as Eleuterio
- Tere Cornejo as Nurse
- Aurora Cortes
- Enrique Gilabert as Apoderado de Karim
- Juan Pelaez as Braulio
