= ¿Quién eres tú? =

- Genre: Telenovela
- Created by: Jimena Romero
- Based on: La usurpadora by Ines Rodena
- Written by: Jimena Romero; Lina Uribe
- Directed by: Luis Manzo; Rodolfo Hoyos
- Creative director: Gabriela Monroy
- Starring: Laura Carmine; Julián Gil; Isabel Cristina Estrada; Lincoln Palomeque; Marisol del Olmo; José Narváez; Paula Barreto; Jorge Cao
- Music by: Miguel de Nárvaez
- Opening theme: ¿Quién eres tú? by Natalia Quintana and Héctor Tobo
- Countries of origin: United States; Colombia; Mexico
- No. of seasons: 1
- No. of episodes: 120

Production
- Executive producers: Patricio Wills; Hugo León Ferrer
- Producer: Madeleine Contreras
- Editor: Alba Merchán Hamann
- Production companies: RTI Producciones; Univision; Televisa

Original release
- Network: Telemicro (Dominican Republic)
- Release: 12 November 2012 – 6 May 2013

Related
- El hogar que yo robé; La intrusa (1986 Mexican TV series); La usurpadora (Mexican TV series)

¿Quién eres tú? (Infringement) (also known in developing as La Otra Cara) is a 2012 Spanish-language telenovela produced by RTI Producciones and Televisa for Mexico-based television network Gala TV and United States–based television network UniMás (formally TeleFutura). It is a remake of La usurpadora.

Julian Gil stars as the protagonist, while Laura Carmine stars as the dual protagonist/antagonist, portraying twin sisters Natalia and Veronica.

== History ==
A January 7, 2013, airdate was confirmed by UniMás (previously TeleFutura) on December 12, 2012. From January 7 to January 18, 2013, UniMás broadcast ¿Quién Eres Tú? weeknights at 10pm/9c. It was removed from the airwaves after only ten episodes due to low ratings. As of January 21, 2013, UniMás is airing Rosario Tijeras weeknights at 10pm/9c, replacing ¿Quién Eres Tú?.

== Cast ==
=== Main cast ===
Actor	Character	Known as
Laura Carmine	Natalia Garrido / Verónica Garrido de Esquivel	Natalia: Verónica's twin sister, Felipe's wife, Antonio and Emilia's daughter in law, Lucas and Gabriela's stepmother, main heroine Verónica: Natalia's twin sister, Felipe's ex-wife, Lorenzo's controlling sister in law, main villain, killed by Lorenzo by accident
Julián Gil	Felipe Esquivel	Verónica's ex-husband, Antonio and Emilia's son, Gabriela and Lucas' father, Lorenzo's brother, Natalia's husband, main hero
Isabel Cristina Estrada	Francisca Román	Natalia's best friend, Monica's mother, in love with Ivan
Lincoln Palomeque	Lorenzo Esquivel	Felipe's brother, Antonio and Emilia's son, Gabriela and Lucas' uncle, Natalia's brother in law, Verónica's controlling brother in law/lover and accomplice, in accomplice with Camilo, main villain ends up in prison
Marisol del Olmo	Lucía Sabina	Lucas and Gabriela's mother, Felipe's ex-wife, Camilo's wife
José Narváez	Iván Cuellar	Felipe's best friend, in love with Francisca
Paula Barreto	Julieta Seles	Secretary at Punta Blanca; had an affair with Felipe and his father Antonio; mother of Sebastian son of Antonio.
Jorge Cao	Antonio Esquivel	Felipe and Lorenzo's father, Natalia/Veronica's father in law, Gabriela and Lucas' grandfather. Lover of Julieta; had a son with her name Sebastian.
Agmeth Escaf	David Santamaría	is investigator, detective
Valentina Lizcano	Florencia Monard	A friend of Natalia's and Veronica's lover, Manuel's daughter, later killed by Veronica
Viviana Serna	Gabriela Esquivel	Felipe and Lucia's daughter, Lorenzo's niece, Antonio and Emilia's granddaughter, Laura's friend, Monica's best friend
Alfredo Ahnert	Camilo Benìtez	Lucia's husband, in accomplices with Lorenzo and Veronica, main villain
José Julián Gaviria	Lucas Esquivel	Felipe and Lucia's son, Lorenzo's nephew, Antonio and Emilia's grandson, Federico's friend, in love with Monica
Matilde Lemaitre	Laura Beltrán	Gabriela's friend, died of drug overdose
Marta Liliana Ruiz	Emilia de Esquivel	Antonio's wife, Felipe and Lorenzo's mother, Natalia/Veronica's mother in law. Gabriela and Lucas's grandmother
Juan David Agudelo	Federico Vargas	Lucas's friend, killed by Charlie
Pedro Rendón	Carlos "Charlie" Sánchez	Francisca's ex-boyfriend, drug trafficking, villain
Jessica San Juan	Mónica Román	Francisca's daughter, Gabriela's best friend, in love with Lucas
Luis Enrique Roldán	Manuel Monard	Florencia's father

=== Special Cast ===
Actor	Character	Known as
Rodolfo Valdés	Saul	Natalia's ex-boyfriend, killed by Camilo's accomplices
Rubén Arciniegas		
Álex Gil		
Natalia Beyoda		Natalia and Verónica's mother, commits suicide
Margarita Reyes	Sonia	Killed by Camilo's accomplices
María Cristina Galindo		
Adriana López		
Christian Gómez		
Karen Cao		
William Figueroa		
Gloria Barrios		
Àngela María León		
Isauro Delgado		
Edgar De León		
Mauricio Goyeneche		
Conrado Osorio		
Hugo Darío Castro		
Gilberto Antía		
María Eugenia Giraldo		
Manuel Antonio Gómez		
Catherine French		
Juan Sebastián Quintero		
Diana Parra		
Daniel Ávila		

== Broadcasters ==
Country	Alternate title/Translation	TV network(s)	Series premiere	Series finale	Weekly schedule	Timeslot
Dominican Republic	¿Quién eres tú?	Telemicro	November 12, 2012	May 6, 2013	Monday to Friday	21:00(9:00)
Uruguay	¿Quién eres tú?	Canal 10 Uruguay	January 1, 2013	April 19, 2013	Tuesday to Friday	22:00
United States	¿Quién eres tú?	UniMás	January 7, 2013	January 18, 2013	Monday to Friday	22:00(10:00)
Ecuador	¿Quién eres tú?	Gama TV	May 13, 2013	October 18, 2013	Monday to Friday	16:00
France	Doubles Jeux	Outre-Mer 1ère	June 10, 2013	November 20, 2013	Monday to Friday	11:45
Venezuela	¿Quién eres tú?	Venevision	July 15, 2013	December 20, 2013	Monday to Saturday	23:00
Panama	¿Quién eres tú?	Telemetro	November 18, 2013	April 22, 2014	Monday to Friday	15:30
Paraguay	¿Quién eres tú?	La Tele	December 16, 2013		Monday to Friday	23:00
Argentina	¿Quién eres tú?	Cablevisión	January 6, 2014		Monday to Friday	21:15
Mexico	¿Quién eres tú?	Gala TV	March 3, 2014	August 15, 2014	Monday to Friday	15:00
Colombia	¿Quién eres tú?	Más Qué Entretenimiento	October 13, 2015	October 7, 2016	Monday to Friday	21:00 - 21:30
Croatia	Blizanke	Doma TV	March 1, 2016	Present	Monday to Friday	13:15
Slovenia	Nedolžna vsiljivka	POP TV	March 22, 2016	September 5, 2016	Monday to Friday	15:30
Colombia	¿Quién eres tú?	RCN Televisión	January 22, 2019	July 9, 2019	Monday to Friday	10:30
