= Coraima Torres =

Venezuelan telenovela actress

Coraima Alejandra Torres Díaz (born June 6, 1973, in Valencia, Venezuela) is a telenovela actress.

== Career ==
She started her acting career in Venezuela, in the late 1980s. Her first roles were in the telenovelas "Gardenia" and "Alondra". She got her first leading role in 1992, in the famous telenovela "Kassandra", which was shown in more than 100 countries. After "Kassandra" she went to Colombia where she got a leading role in the telenovelas "Sueños y espejos" (Dreams and mirrors). Her partner in that telenovela was Colombian actor Nicolas Montero. They fell in love and got married in 1996. Coraima gave birth to a son in 1994.

Coraima also played in a mini-series called "Geminis" and in another Venezuelan telenovela "Cambio de Piel" (Change of skin). After this soap, she worked in Peru and Argentina where she played in three telenovelas "María Emilia", "Amor Latino" (Latin Love) and "Soledad". Her latest telenovelas are called "Amor del bueno" and "Lorena". She resides in Bogotá, capital of Colombia. Coraima was working in the Colombian telenovela El Último Matrimonio Feliz playing Camila, a woman who has to face life after leaving her husband.

In 2012, she worked in 5 Viudas Sueltas

"Kassandra" was very popular in FR Yugoslavia and Macedonia during the '90s. When she visited FRY and Macedonia in 1997 with the colleague Henry Soto, and with her husband and child, she was greeted with a large crowd at the Belgrade airport. Among the welcoming committee was Šaban Bajramović. During their visit they went to Belgrade, Niš and Novi Sad, and later in Skopje, Bitola and Ohrid in Macedonia.

== Telenovela ==
- Alondra (RCTV International - RCTV, 1989.)
- Gardenia (RCTV International - RCTV, 1990.)
- Kassandra (RCTV International - RCTV, 1992.)
- Dulce Ilusion (RCTV International - RCTV, 1993.)
- Sueno y Espejos (RTI, 1995.)
- Cambio de Piel (RCTV International -RCTV, 1997.)
- María Emilia: Querida (ATV, 1999.)
- Amor Latino (Argentina)
- Soledad (América Producciones, Perú)
- Amor Del Bueno (Venevisión International, Venezuela)
- Lorena (RCN Television, 2005.)
- El Ultimo Matrimonio Feliz (Camila Andrade) (RCN Television, 2008.)
- RCN 2008, Mujeres Asesinas (Carmen, Honrada) (RCN Television, 2008.)
- La Pola (RCN 2010)
- 5 Viudas Sueltas (Caracol, Sony Pictures 2012)
