= Cambio de piel (TV series) =

- Genre: Telenovela; Romance; Drama
- Created by: José Ignacio Cabrujas
- Written by: Perla Farías; Norberto Vieyra
- Directed by: Tony Rodríguez
- Starring: Coraima Torres; Eduardo Serrano; Caridad Canelón
- Opening theme: Este amor de locos by Karolina
- Ending theme: Este amor de locos by Karolina
- Country of origin: Venezuela
- Original language: Spanish
- No. of episodes: 110

Production
- Executive producer: Carmen Cecilia Urbaneja
- Producer: Hernando Faría
- Production location: Caracas
- Production company: RCTV

Original release
- Network: RCTV
- Release: August 10, 1997 – March 22, 1998

Related
- María de los ángeles; Dónde está el amor; La dama de rosa (1986)

Cambio de piel (English title: Change of Skin) is a Venezuelan telenovela produced by Radio Caracas Televisión in 1998 based on the telenovela La dama de rosa written by José Ignacio Cabrujas in 1986. This version was created by Perla Farías and lasted for 110 episodes.

== Synopsis ==
Daniella Martínez and José Ignacio Quintana lead radically different lives. He is financially solid, competent and married. His marriage is stable with no alarming events in spite of his infidelities. Unfortunately, his wife has not been able to bear children. Daniella is a young, impetuous woman, who is very astute, determined and joyful and whose lifelong dream is to become an actress. In her search for stardom, she meets José Ignacio Quintana, and a strong attraction grows between them immediately. They have no idea that this encounter will result in an unlimited, passionate relationship which will be marked by resentment. They are brought together by love and separated by pain.

Daniella, a victim of injustice, is arrested and sentenced for a crime she did not commit. José Ignacio, feeling betrayed, falls into confusing events, and, in Daniella's eyes, he becomes the main person to blame for her tragedy. Years later, José Ignacio tries to erase this woman from his mind and heart, the woman he says he hates. Great passion will evolve around this relationship, which will create unexpected and revealing situations for them, as well as for the characters surrounding them.

== Cast ==
- Coraima Torres as Daniella Martínez / Victoria Guerrero
- Eduardo Serrano as José Ignacio Quintana
- Caridad Canelón as Leyla Daud
- América Alonso as Amalia Martínez
- Ricardo Bianchi as Luis Enrique Arismendi
- Héctor Mayerston as Augusto Quintana
- Pedro Durán as Ángel Buenaventura
- Beatriz Valdés as Yolanda Urbieta
- Catherine Correia as Ana Virginia Arismendi
- Alberto Alifa as Elías Durán
- Larisa Asuaje as Silvia
- María Luisa Lamata as Petra
- José Gabriel Gonsalves as Marcos Martínez
- María Cristina Lozada as Soledad Martínez Vda. de Quintana
- Indira Leal as Carla Ruggeiro
- Manuel Salazar as Néstor Molina
- Vilem Stalek as Diego
- Jessica Braun as Tulia Martínez
