= José Ignacio Cabrujas =

Venezuelan playwright (1937–1995)

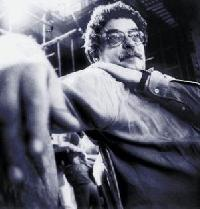
- Born: José Ignacio Cabruja Lofiego; July 17, 1937; Caracas, Federal District, Venezuela
- Died: October 21, 1995 (aged 58); Porlamar, Margarita Island, Venezuela
- Education: Universidad Central de Venezuela
- Occupations: Film director, producer, actor, screenwriter, soap opera's writer
- Years active: 1961–1995
- Spouses: Democracia Lopez (m. 1960–1965); Eva Ivanyi (m. 1976–1984); Isabel Palacios (m. 1985–1990)
- Children: 2

José Ignacio Cabrujas Lofiego (July 17, 1937 – October 21, 1995 in Porlamar, Margarita Island) was a Venezuelan playwright, theater director, chronicler, soap opera writer, drama librettist, screenplay writer, radio moderator, humanist and political campaigns designer. He is considered one of the founders and innovators of the modern telenovela genre in Latin America, and is called the "Maestro de las Telenovelas."

== Early years ==
José Ignacio Cabrujas spent his childhood in the Caracas neighborhood of Catia. His parents were José Ramón Cabruja Esteso and Matilde Lofiego of Cabruja. His original name is "Cabruja" so he was changed when the a story emerged during his tenure in the Teatro Universitario (TU). The confusion arises from the renowned journalist Lorenzo Batallán, who published a note on the Cabrujas' performance at TU, adding an "S". Apparently the young actor was pleased and decided to continue using the 'S', so he came to be known as "José Ignacio Cabrujas."

== Career ==
After reading Les Misérables by Victor Hugo as a youth, he decided to be a writer. In fact, he could not stop crying and was so involved in his exaltation that he said: "This is what I want to do in life; these letters, these pages have produced in me all this emotion ...it's a miracle; I want to be part of that miracle."

In 1956, thanks to a grant, he began studying law at the Universidad Central de Venezuela. After two years of studying law, his second brother, Francisco Cabrujas, was born (Today, he is involved in film and soap opera's scoring). But José Ignacio's sudden entrance in the university theater revealed his true vocation, and so he left the University.

== Family ==
He married three times: to Democracia Lopez (1960-1965), to Eva Ivanyi (who was his costume maker and producer), and the famous Venezuelan singer, musicologist and choral director Isabel Palacios (1985 - 1990). He had 2 sons: Juan Francisco Cabrujas (1961) and Diego Cabrujas (1987). He had one sister, Martha Cabrujas, who is involved in the plastic arts.

== Printed and electronic publications about his life and work ==
- 1979: «Tres dramaturgos venezolanos de hoy R. Chalbaud, J.I. Cabrujas, I. Chocrón» by Gleider Hernández-Almeida, text published by the Nuevo Grupo.
- 1983: «Cabrujas en Tres Actos» by Leonardo Azparren Jiménez, text published by the Nuevo Grupo.
- 1991: «El Teatro Según Cabrujas»,
- 1994: «Catia en Tres Voces» by Milagro Socorro, where she interviews Cabrujas about his childhood in Catia.
- 1995: «Cabrujerías: un estudio sobre la dramática de José Ignacio Cabrujas» by Francisco Rojas Pozo
- 1999: «La Caracas de Cabrujas» by Ibsen Martínez.
- 1999: «Descubriendo a José Ignacio Cabrujas Un hombre... Un Artista... Una Conciencia...» Claudy De Sousa's Degree's Thesis .
- 2000: «Venezuela: La Obra Inconclusa de José Ignacio Cabrujas» Yoyiana Ahumada's, MSc. Thesis
- 2006: «Premios Nacionales de Cultura: Teatro José Ignacio Cabrujas 1989» by Gloria Soares, in which she collects information and references notes divided into seven chapters to organize and summarize his work.
- 2006: «Cabrujas, ese ángel terrible: seis miradas de taller» by Yoyiana Ahumada and La Fundación, in collaboration with Manuel Felipe Sierra, Daniel Gutierrez, Eduardo Fermin Furiati Claudia Paez, Iraida Tapias and Arnaldo Gutierrez.
- 2009: «Historia y cotidianidad en la dramaturgia de José Ignacio Cabrujas» by Magaly Guerrero
- 2009: «El Mundo Según Cabrujas» by Yoyiana Ahumada Licea. An essay which contains a compilation of his press-published research articles.
- 2010: «Obra Dramática» by Leonardo Azparren Giménez y Gloria Soares De Ponte. Contains 16 of his plays, a biography, a chronology and texts from Nicolas Curiel, published in three volumes: https://wikimania2015.wikimedia.org/wiki/Special:MyLanguage/Wikimaniapublished
- 2012: «José Ignacio Cabrujas habla y escribe» (two volumes) . by Leonardo Azparren Giménez. An anthology of interviews, conversations, essays and newspaper articles with an introduction study by Alberto Barrera Tyszka.

== Selected filmography ==
- La quema de Judas (1975)

== Telenovelas ==
- LA SEÑORA DE CARDENAS
  - La Señora de Cardenas .... Venezuela (1977) with Doris Wells and Miguel Ángel Landa
- SANGRE AZUL
  - Sangre azul ... Venezuela (1979) with Pierina España and José Luis Rodríguez
- NATALIA DE 8 A 9
  - Natalia de 8 a 9 .... Venezuela (1980) with Marina Baura and María Conchita Alonso
  - Vivir por ti .... Mexico (2008)
- LA DUEÑA
  - La Dueña .... Venezuela (1985) with Amanda Gutiérrez and Daniel Alvarado
  - Dueña y Señora .... Puerto Rico (2006) with Karla Monroig and Angel Viera
  - La Patrona .... Mexico, USA (2013) with Aracely Arambula and Jorge Luis Pila
  - La Patrona .... Mexico, USA (2018)
- LA DAMA DE ROSA
  - La dama de rosa .... Venezuela (1986) with Jeannette Rodríguez and Carlos Mata
  - Cambio de Piel .... Venezuela (1997) with Coraima Torres and Eduardo Serrano
  - Géminis, venganza de amor .... Spain (2002)
