= La indomable (Venezuelan TV series) =

- Genre: Telenovela
- Created by: Inés Rodena
- Written by: Ana Mercedes Escámez
- Starring: Marina Baura; Elio Rubens
- Country of origin: Venezuela
- Original language: Spanish
- No. of seasons: 1
- No. of episodes: 254

Production
- Production locations: Caracas, Venezuela

Original release
- Network: Radio Caracas Televisión
- Release: 1972 – 1973

Related
- La venganza (1977); Marimar (1994); Marimar (2007); Tormenta en el paraíso (2007); Marimar (2015)

La indomable, is a Venezuelan telenovela written by Inés Rodena and adapted by Ana Mercedes Escámez for Radio Caracas Televisión in 1972. It starred Marina Baura and Elio Rubens.

A new version of this soap opera entitled Alma indomable was made in 2010.

== Plot ==
María de la Cruz (Maricruz) Olivares is humble girl who lives in the countryside with her grandparents and sister. Despite their poverty, they are extremely happy. One day the handsome Aviator Octavio Narváez meets and falls for her. Octavio, known for Maricruz, feels love and compassion for their poverty and illiteracy, but her sister-in-law, the terrible and evil Lucía Santibáñez de Narváez, hates her.

== Cast ==
- Marina Baura as Maricruz
- Elio Rubens as Octavio Narváez
- Mario Santa Cruz as Abuelo
- Martha Olivo as Santa
- Paula D'Arco as Sofía
- Bárbara Teyde as Lucía Narváez
- Carlos Marquéz as Porfirio
- Marisela Berti as Lucy
- Manolo Coego as Maraja de Capultana
- Wendy Torres as Violeta

== Other versions ==
- La venganza - First remake made in Mexico in 1977, starring Helena Rojo and Enrique Lizalde.
- Marimar - Second remake made in Mexico in 1994, starring Thalía and Eduardo Capetillo.
- Gata salvaje - 2002 remake made in Venezuela, starring Marlene Favela and Mario Cimarro.
- MariMar - Third remake made in the Philippines in 2007 by GMA 7, starring Marian Rivera and Dingdong Dantes.
- Alma Indomable - Third remake made in Venezuela in 2010, starring Scarlet Ortiz and Jose Angel Llamas.
- Corazón indomable - Fourth remake made in Mexico in 2013, starring Ana Brenda Contreras and Daniel Arenas.
- MariMar - Fourth remake made in the Philippines in 2015 by GMA 7, starring Megan Young and Tom Rodriguez.
