= Marina Baura =

Venezuelan telenovela actress

- Born: Julia Pérez; November 1, 1941 (age 84); Galicia, Spain
- Occupation: Television actress
- Employers: RCTV; Venevisión

Julia Pérez (born November 1, 1941), known professionally as Marina Baura, is a Spanish former telenovela actress.

== Early life ==
Born as Julia Pérez in Galicia, Spain, she moved with her parents and brother Jesús to Venezuela when she was 15 years old, in 1956. She started her professional career in the early 1960s as a model in El Show de Renny, a popular variety show hosted by Renny Ottolina and aired on Radio Caracas Televisión.

She later studied dramatic art under the direction of Paul Antillano, and made her debut in the Venevisión TV-series Casos y cosas de casa. After that she worked with Simón Díaz in his comedy sitcom La Quinta de Simón, while playing small roles in several telenovelas.

== Professional career ==
Baura received her first leading role in Lucecita (1967), which drew favorable reviews with her performance as the lead character. She then became a leading actress in a number of productions, including La señorita Elena (1967), Rosario (1968), Lisa, mi amor (1969) and De turno con la angustia (1969), before returning to RCTV as an actress in 1970.

While at RCTV, Baura starred in several telenovelas such as Cristina (1970), La virgen ciega (1970), and specially in La usurpadora (1971), where she played a significant dual role. She also starred in La italianita (1973), La indomable (1974), and Valentina (1975), where she played her second double role.

Other of her contributions were Resurrección (1977), Silvia Rivas divorciada (1977), TV Confidencial (1977), Mabel Valdez, periodista (1978), Natalia de 8 a 9 (1980), Chao Cristina (1983) and Muros del silencio (1983).

In 1974 RCTV aired Doña Bárbara, based on the novel by Rómulo Gallegos and scripted by José Ignacio Cabrujas. Baura was selected to play the central role, previously established by María Félix in the classic 1943 film. The RCTV version was the first color TV program made in Venezuela, as well as the first telenovela aired in Europe.

During the same period, she starred in miniseries based on Gallegos's novels as Canaima (1976) and Sobre la misma tierra (1976), as well as in Guillermo Meneses's La Balandra Isabel llegó esta tarde (1978). Later she co-starred with Doris Wells in Gallegos's La hora menguada (1984).

Baura voluntarily retired in 1984. Eventually, she returned to acting in 1990 at the invitation of Cabrujas to embody the central role of Emperatriz Jurado in Emperatriz, produced by Marte TV and aired by RCTV. Then, in 2003 she made a special guest appearance in the successful Venevisión soap opera Cosita rica.

Her film credits include Yo, el gobernador (1965), co-starred by humorist Joselo, and El reportero (1968), teaming up along with Amador Bendayán. She later played a supporting part for Amparo Rivelles and Julio Alemán in La viuda blanca (1970), and co-starred with José Bardina in Bodas de papel.

== Private life ==
Baura married Hernán Pérez Belisario, with whom she had one daughter, Mónica Pérez Pérez, before retiring from RCTV. They divorced in 1992.

She currently lives in Caracas.

== Filmography ==
=== Films ===
Year	Title	Role	Notes
1965	Yo, el gobernador	Unknown role	Fìlm debut
1968	El reportero	Unknown role	
1970	La viuda blanca	Carlota Castelar	
1979	Bodas de papel	Wife	

=== Television ===
Year	Title	Role	Notes
1965	Madres solteras		
1967	Lucecita	Lucecita	Lead role
1967	La señorita Elena	Elena	Lead role
1968	Rosario	Rosario	Lead role
1969	De turno con la angustia	Unknown role	
1969	Lisa, mi amor	Lisa	Lead role
1970	La Virgen Ciega		Lead role
1970–1971	Cristina	Cristina	Lead role
1971–1972	La usurpadora	Alicia / Rosalba	Lead role
1972–1973	La indomable	Maricruz	Lead role
1972	Abandonada		Lead role
1973–1974	La italianita	Rina	Lead role
1974–1975	Doña Bárbara	Doña Bárbara	Lead role
1975–1976	Valentina	Valentina Montiel / Sonia Gámez	Lead role
1976	Sobre la misma tierra		Lead role
1976	Canaima		Lead role
1977	Resurrección		Lead role
1977–1978	Tv Confidencial		Lead role
1977	Silvia Rivas, Divorciada	Silvia Rivas	Lead role
1979–1980	Mabel Valdez, periodista	Mabel Valdez	Lead role
1980	Natalia de 8 a 9	Natalia	Lead role
1981	Goméz ll		Leas role
1983	Chao Cristina	Cristina	Lead role
1990–1991	Emperatriz	Emperatriz	Lead role
2003	Cosita rica	Tentación Luján	Lead role
2006	Soltera y sin compromiso	Yolanda de Maldonado	Television film
