= La usurpadora (Venezuelan TV series) =

Venezuelan television series

- Genre: Telenovela
- Created by: Inés Rodena
- Written by: Ana Mercedes Escámez
- Screenplay by: Ana Mercedes Escámez
- Directed by: Juan Lamata
- Starring: Marina Baura; Elio Rubens
- Opening theme: "Hello, Good Bye" by Francis Lai
- Country of origin: Venezuela
- Original language: Spanish
- No. of episodes: 300

Production
- Executive producer: Arquímedes Rivero

Original release
- Network: Radio Caracas Televisión
- Release: March 12, 1971 – July 19, 1972

Related
- El hogar que yo robé (1981); La intrusa (1986); La usurpadora (1998); ¿Quién eres tú? (2012); La usurpadora (2019)

La usurpadora is a Venezuelan telenovela created by Inés Rodena and adapted by Ana Mercedes Escámez for Radio Caracas Televisión in 1971. This was the first adaptation that made the original story of Inés Rodena. Marina Baura and Raúl Amundaray star as the main protagonists.

== Cast ==
Actor	Character
Marina Baura	Alicia / Rosalba
Raúl Amundaray	Daniel
María Teresa Acosta	Mamá Gina
María Luisa Angulo	Juana
Jorge Almada	Lic.Orozco
Angélica Arenas	Sara
Flor Ascanio	La Artista
Haydée Balza	Estefanía
América Barrio	Fidelia
Elio Rubens	Manuel
