= Pecado mortal (TV series) =

- Genre: Telenovela
- Created by: Caridad Bravo Adams
- Starring: Amparo Rivelles; Elsa Cárdenas; Osvaldo Calvo; Tito Junco
- Country of origin: Mexico
- Original language: Spanish
- No. of episodes: 47

Production
- Executive producer: Raúl Astor
- Running time: 42-45 minutes
- Production company: Televisa

Original release
- Network: Telesistema Mexicano
- Release: 1960

Related
- Abrázame muy fuerte (2000); Que te perdone Dios (2015)

Pecado mortal is a Mexican telenovela produced by Telesistema Mexicano in 1960. It starred Amparo Rivelles, Elsa Cárdenas, Osvaldo Calvo, and Tito Junco as the antagonist, and was written by Caridad Bravo Adams and produced by Raúl Astor.

== Cast ==
- Amparo Rivelles as Clara Hernandez
- Elsa Cárdenas as Soledad
- Osvaldo Calvo as Carlos
- Tito Junco as Juan Manuel Castro
- Freddy Fernández "El Pichi" as Jose Maria
- Rosa Elena Durgel as Julia Falcon
- Rebecca San Román as Flora Falcon

== Adaptations ==
Country	Original title	Original release	Episodes	Source
Mexico	Abrázame muy fuerte	July 31, 2000	135	Fusionada con La Gata y La Indomable, de Inés Rodena
Mexico	Que te perdone Dios	January 19, 2015	121	
