= Alma indomable =

- Genre: Telenovela
- Created by: Alberto Gómez
- Written by: Alberto Gómez; Omaira Rivero
- Directed by: Yaky Ortega; Tito Rojas; María Eugenia Perera
- Starring: Scarlet Ortiz; José Ángel Llamas; Lilibeth Morillo; Luis José Santander
- Theme music composer: Humberto Estrada
- Opening theme: Casi te Olvido by Pablo Montero
- Countries of origin: Venezuela; United States
- Original language: Spanish
- No. of episodes: 165

Production
- Executive producers: Peter Tinoco; Ana Teresa Arismendi
- Producers: Dulce Teran; Arquímedes Rivero
- Production location: South Florida
- Running time: 42-45 minutes
- Production company: Venevisión

Original release
- Network: Venevisión; Univision
- Release: October 19, 2009 – May 16, 2010

Related
- Amor comprado; Pecadora

Alma indomable (English title: Untamed Soul) is a telenovela created by Alberto Gómez, produced by Venevisión International and filmed in Miami, Florida. Univision aired Alma indomable from October 19, 2009 at the 1/12c timeslot.

Scarlet Ortiz and José Ángel Llamas starred as the protagonists, while Lilibeth Morillo and Luis José Santander starred as antagonists.

== Plot ==
Alma Pérez is a diamond in the rough: 23 years old, without any education who lives with her cruel stepmother Rafaela "Fucha" Pérez and sister Jazmín Pérez. Destiny brings her to the hacienda of Patricio Sorrento, Las Brisas, where she begins to live as a guest. Unknown to her, she is actually the heiress to Patricio's fortune. Fucha, her adoptive grandmother was paid to raise Alma by her real grandmother Paula Romero.

At the hacienda, Alma meets Juan Pablo Robles, the administrator of the hacienda who lives with his mother Caridad Robles. He begins to teach Alma how to read and write. Alma and Juan Pablo immediately fall in love, but when she sees him kissing Dubraska Sorrento, she feels betrayed and leaves the hacienda. After some time, she comes back as a successful, rich and beautiful woman to claim her fortune and seek revenge on her enemies.

Esteban De la Vega is a rich man who also loves Alma and will do anything to have her. Together with his cousin Abigail Richardi, who is in love with Juan Pablo, they conspire to separate the two.

== Cast ==
- Scarlet Ortiz as Alma Pérez / Alma Sorrento
- José Ángel Llamas as Juan Pablo Robles
- Lilibeth Morillo as Abigail Richardi
- Luis José Santander as Esteban De la Vega
- Víctor González as Nicanor Sánchez
- Lisette Morelos as Monica Sorrento
- Karina Mora as Dubraska Sorrento
- Oscar Corbella as Patricio Sorrento
- Patty Álvarez as Gertrudis Sorrento
- Leonardo Daniel as Rogelio Sorrento
- Yul Bürkle as Fernando Ríos
- Rodolfo Jiménez as León Ríos
- Gabriel Parisi as Federico Urbaneja
- Juan Vidal as Raúl Urbaneja
- Adita Riera as Caridad Vda. de Robles
- Martha Picanes as Paula Romero
- Esperanza Rendón as Cecilia Ocampo
- Franklin Virgüez as Danilo Ocampo
- Alan as Alberto "Beto" Ocampo / Alberto De la Vega Antúnez
- Maite Embil as Amanda Rosales / Amparo "La Españolita"
- Isabel Moreno as Rafaela "Fucha" Pérez
- Tali Duclaud as Jazmín Pérez de Ocampo
- Kenya Hijuelos as Susana "Susy"
- Vivian Ruiz as Otilia Bezaes
- Nelida Ponce as Carmela "Carmelita" Ríos
- Julio Capote as Ramón Olivares
- Yami Quintero as Luisa Olivares
- Ezequiel Montalt as Mauricio Lira
- Roberto Levermann as Theofilo "Theo"
- Yadhira Santana as Guadalupe "Lupe" Fuentes
- Martha Pabón as Rosa Angélica Antúnez
- Nury Flores as Madre Superiora
- Alí Sánchez as Sabrina Ortiz "Azul"
- Verónica Noboa as Venus Estrella
