= Maya Entertainment =

Company in California

Maya Entertainment Group, Inc. was an independent multi-platform video distribution company. Moctesuma Esparza founded the company in Los Angeles, California in 2007. Maya Entertainment procured and produced content that appealed to the new diverse American Latino and multi-cultural audiences. The company acquired a library of over 100 titles.

Maya Entertainment launched "Maya at the Movies" with Time Warner Cable. They also participated in The Maya Indie Films Festival, a traveling summer film tour. The festival embodied a culturally diverse cinema and attempted to promote Latino prominence and talent in the film industry and to provide an outlet for independent film exposure.

Maya Entertainment later released Sympathy for Delicious, a major motion picture starring Mark Ruffalo, Laura Linney, and Orlando Bloom.

== History ==
Founder Moctesuma Esparza was born and raised in Los Angeles. He received a B.A. and MFA in Theatre Arts, Motion Pictures and Television, from UCLA, and has dedicated himself to empowering and transforming the images of Latinos in Hollywood.

== Feature films ==
Theatrical films

- Across the Line: The Exodus of Charlie Wright- starring Aidan Quinn, Mario Van Peebles, and Andy Garcia
- The Dry Land - starring America Ferrera, Jason Ritter, and Wilmer Valderrama
- Sins of My Father (Pecados de mi Padre) - the true story of Pablo Escobar, the infamous boss of Colombia's Medellin drug cartel, as told through the eyes of his son
- Sympathy for Delicious - directed by Mark Ruffalo; starring Ruffalo, Orlando Bloom, Laura Linney and Juliette Lewis
- Without Men - starring Eva Longoria Parker, Christian Slater and Oscar Nunez

== International film distribution ==
International film distribution is currently headed by Elias Axume. Maya Entertainment sells rights to its entertainment properties worldwide and has a large presence at major markets including Berlin Film Festival/European Film Market, Hong Kong FILMART, Cannes Film Festival, MIP-TV, Toronto International Film Festival, MIPCOM and AFM.

Currently

- Across the Line: The Exodus of Charlie Wright - starring Aidan Quinn and Mario van Peebles
- Café - starring Jennifer Love Hewitt and Jamie Kennedy
- The Jesuit - starring Michelle Rodriguez and Willem Dafoe
- La Mission - starring Benjamin Bratt
- Without Men - starring Eva Longoria Parker, Christian Slater and Oscar Nunez

== List of releases ==
Film	Director	Genre	Release
La Mission	N/A	Drama	2008
Garcia Girls	Georgina Garcia Riedel	Comedy	2008
Fraude	Luis Mandoki	Documentary	2008
Talento de Barrio	José Iván Santiago Rivera	Action	2008
Maldeamores	Carlitos Ruiz Ruiz	Comedy	2008
Amexicano	Matthew Bonifacio	Drama	2009
August Evening	Chris Eska	Drama	2009
Personal Belongings	Alejandro Brugues	Drama	2009
Coyote	Brian Peterson	Drama	2009
The Pearl	Alfred Zacharias	Drama	2009
Mancora	Ricardo de Montreuil	Drama	2009
Sleep Dealer	Alex Rivera	Sci-Fi	2009
Fast Lane	David Betances	Action	2009
Casi Divas	Issa Lopez	Comedy	2009
The Line	James Cotten	Action	2009
Bad Guys	Rick Jacobson	Action	2009
Bajo la Sal	Mario Muñoz	Thriller	2009
Vicious Circle	Paul Boyd	Drama	2009
The Ministers	Franc. Reyes	Thriller	2010
Once Upon a Time in Rio	Breno Silveira	Drama	2010
Sultanes Del Sur	Alejandro Lozano	Action	2010
Cronicas Chilangas	Carlos Enderle	Comedy	2010
One Hot Summer	Betty Kaplan	Drama	2010
Mejor Es Que Gabriela No Se Muera	Sergio Umansky	Comedy	2010
Como No Te Voy A Querer	Victor Avelar	Drama	2010
Hotel California	Geo Santini	Action	2010
The War Boys	Ron Daniels	Drama	2010
Harlem Hostel	Nestor Miranda	Comedy	2010
Anything Goes (Vale Todo)	Roberto Estrella	Action	2010
Un Dia En El Banco	Al Bravo	Comedy	2010
Samurai Avenger	Kurando Mitsutake	Action	2010
Chasing 3000	Gregory J. Lanesey	Family	2010
The Kid: Chamaco	Miguel Necoechea	Sport	2010
Spoken Word	Victor Nuñez	Drama	2010
I Do...Knot (Recien Cazado)	Rene Bueno	Romantic Comedy	2010
In Therapy	José Alvarenga Jr.	Comedy	2010
Giallo	Dario Argento	Thriller	2010
Backyard	Carlos Carrera	Crime	2010
The Dry Land	Ryan Piers Williams	Drama	2010
Rains of Injustice (Tropico De Sangre)	Juan Delancer	Biopic	2010
Walking Vengeance	Agustín Díaz Yanes	Thriller	2010
Hunter Prey	Sandy Collora	Sci-Fi	2010
Across the Line	R. Ellis Frazier	Crime	2010
All She Can	Amy Wendel	Drama	2011
Sins of My Father	Nicolas Entel	Documentary	2011
See You in September	Tamara Tunie	None	2011
A Kiss of Chaos	Ricardo Sean Thompson	Crime	2011
The Zombie Farm	Ricardo Islas	Horror	2011
Spooner	Drake Doremus	Comedy	2011
The People I've Slept With	Quentin Lee	Romantic Comedy	2011
Year of the Carnivore	Sook-Yin Lee	Romantic Comedy	2011
The Speed of Thought	Evan Oppenheimer	Sci-Fi	2011
Sympathy For Delicious	Mark Ruffalo	Drama	2011
Capadocia: Season 1	Javier Patrón, Carlos Carrera, Pitipol Ybarra	Crime	2011
Hijos Del Carnival: Seasons 1 & 2	N/A	Drama	2011
Playing House	Tom Vaughan	Thriller	2011
Alice: Season 1	N/A	Drama	2011
MANDRAKE: Seasons 1 and 2	N/A	Drama	2011
Epitafios: Season 2	N/A	Drama	2011

== Sources ==
- "The Film Catalogue - Maya Entertainment - Www.thefilmcatalogue.com." The Film Catalogue - Www.thefilmcatalogue.com. Web. 13 June 2011. The Film Catalogue - Maya Entertainment Group - www.thefilmcatalogue.com
- "Maya Entertainment | Home".
- "Maya Entertainment Buys Sundance Title 'All She Can' - IndieWIRE." Filmmakers, Film Industry, Film Festivals, Awards & Movie Reviews | IndieWIRE. Web. 13 June 2011. Maya Entertainment Buys Sundance Title “All She Can”
- "Maya Entertainment Makes Waves in Hollywood | HispanicTips." HispanicTips | The Ultimate Tool for Understanding & Appreciating Hispanics & Latinos :: Empower Yourself. Web. 13 June 2011. Maya Entertainment Makes Waves in Hollywood | HispanicTips
- "Maya Entertainment Nabs Eva Longoria Parker, Christian Slater Comedy 'Without Men' - The Hollywood Reporter." The Latest Entertainment & Hollywood News - The Hollywood Reporter. Web. 13 June 2011. Maya Entertainment Nabs Eva Longoria Parker, Christian Slater Comedy ‘Without Men’
- "Maya Entertainment [us]." The Internet Movie Database (IMDb). Web. 13 June 2011. Advanced search
- "Our Team | Maya Entertainment." Maya Entertainment | Home. Web. 8 June 2011. Our Team | Maya Entertainment
- Jacoby, Anna. "FYIDC: The Maya Indie Film Festival." Washington Life Magazine. Web. 13 June 2011. FYIDC: The Maya Indie Film Festival – Washington Life Magazine
