= Máncora (film) =

- Directed by: Ricardo de Montreuil
- Written by: Oscar Torres; Angel Ibarguren; Juan Luis Nugent
- Produced by: Diego Ojeda
- Starring: Jason Day; Elsa Pataky; Enrique Murciano; Liz Gallardo; Anahi de Crdenas; Phellipe Haagensen
- Edited by: Luis Carballar; Ricardo de Montreuil
- Music by: Angelo Milli
- Production companies: Hispafilms; Napoli Pictures
- Distributed by: Maya Entertainment
- Release dates: January 20, 2008 (Sundance Film Festival); March 20, 2009 (United States; limited)
- Running time: 100 minutes
- Countries: Peru; Spain
- Language: Spanish

Máncora is a 2008 Peruvian-Spanish drama film directed by Peruvian director Ricardo de Montreuil. The film premiered as an official selection at the 2008 Sundance Film Festival.

== Synopsis ==
From the director of La mujer de mi hermano and the writer of Voces inocentes comes Máncora, a road-trip drama that traces the shifting emotional boundaries between three disconnected individuals.

Máncora begins with Santiago (Jason Day), a 21-year-old from Lima who is disturbed by his father's recent and unexpected suicide. Wanting to leave the chill of a grey Lima winter, Santiago decides to go to Máncora, a beach town in the north of the country where the climate is warmer. Right before his departure, Santiago receives an unexpected visit from his stepsister Ximena (Elsa Pataky), an energetic Spanish photographer and her husband Iñigo (Enrique Murciano), an art collector from New York. Their peaceful getaway is quickly disrupted by an act of boundary-crossing and betrayal, which might change their relationship forever.

== Reception ==
On Rotten Tomatoes it has a rating of 33% based on 6 reviews.

== Festivals ==
- Official Selection Sundance Film Festival 2008
- Official Selection Edinburgh International Film Festival 2008
- Official Selection Mill Valley Film Festival 2008
- Official Selection Stockholm International Film Festival 2008
- Official Selection São Paulo International Film Festival 2008
- Official Selection AFI Latin American Film Festival 2008
- Official Selection Seattle International Film Festival 2008
- Winner Best Supporting Actor Ibiza International Film Festival 2008
- Official Selection New York International Latino Film Festival 2008
- Official Selection Bergen International Film Festival 2008
- Official Selection Los Angeles Latino International Film Festival 2008
