= Lucca's World =

2025 film

- Directed by: Mariana Chenillo
- Written by: Javier Peñalosa; Marina Chenillo
- Based on: Los dos hemisferios de Lucca by Bárbara Anderson
- Produced by: Rafael Ley; Mónica Vertiz; Ximena Castro
- Starring: Bárbara Mori; Julián Tello; Juan Pablo Medina
- Distributed by: Netflix
- Release date: January 31, 2025
- Running time: 96 minutes
- Country: Mexico
- Language: Spanish

Lucca's World (Spanish: Los dos hemisferios de Lucca) is a 2025 Mexican drama film directed by Mariana Chenillo. The film stars Bárbara Mori as Bárbara Anderson, a mother of a child with cerebral palsy. Based on actual events and a book of the same name, the film details Anderson’s efforts to secure medical treatment for her son, Lucca, after he received a serious diagnosis. It examines the challenges faced by individuals with disabilities and their caregivers and portrays the role of family support.

As information rather than entertainment, the film has been heavily criticised as spreading a "fantastical message" and being supportive of expensive equipment for which no evidence has been published, and which has been found to be ineffective.

== Plot ==
The film follows Bárbara Anderson and her husband Andrés as they confront their son Lucca’s diagnosis of cerebral palsy. Faced with a lack of effective treatment options in their home country, the family embarks on a life-changing journey to India to access an experimental treatment called the Cytotron, claimed to stimulate neuronal regeneration.

== Cast ==
- Bárbara Mori as Bárbara Anderson
- Juan Pablo Medina as Andrés
- Julián Tello as Lucca
- Samuel Pérez as Bruno
- Danish Husain as Doctor Kumar
- Ari Brickman as Jaramillo
- Abhinav Grover as Venkatesh

== Production ==
The film was shot in locations across India, including Bhopal and Bangalore, ensuring cultural authenticity in the depiction of the family's journey. The production team made significant efforts to represent the traditional aspects of Indian culture.

== Themes ==
The film addresses critical issues related to disability rights and the systemic barriers faced by families seeking treatment for conditions like cerebral palsy. Through Bárbara’s personal struggle, the film advocates for greater inclusion and access to resources for individuals with disabilities.

== Reception ==
=== Performance ===
Mori's portrayal of Bárbara highlights the emotional strength and vulnerability of a mother fighting for her child's well-being. The performance has been praised for its authenticity and depth, reflecting the immense challenges faced by families dealing with disabilities. Mori's work is considered one of the film's standout elements, contributing significantly to its emotional impact.

=== Critical response ===
The film has garnered attention for its emotional depth and its exploration of the human spirit. Critics have praised its powerful storytelling, with particular emphasis on Mori's and Tello's performances. The movie also received recognition for its contributions to discussions surrounding disability and caregiving.

=== Accuracy ===
As a provider of information, rather than entertainment, the film has been heavily criticised as spreading a "fantastical message" and being supportive of expensive equipment for which no evidence has been published, and which has been found to be ineffective. the inventor of the Cytotron had also invented "Shycocan, an electron-producing device which claimed to stop the spread of coronavirus in closed spaces 'by photon mediation'".
