= El Francotirador =

El Francotirador is a Peruvian late-night television programme conducted by the journalist and writer Jaime Bayly.

Bayly hosted late-night shows abroad at CBS Network Latin America and Telemundo Network for six years. After the President of Peru, Alberto Fujimori, sought asylum in Japan after a ten-year term in order to avoid prosecution on charges of corruption, independent news media found itself in a more relaxed position. Bayly hosted political programme El Francotirador (The Sniper), interviewing candidates to the 2001 Presidential Election. In that programme, he apparently offended several personalities with his political opinions, and finally had to quit. Inspired by the experience, Bayly wrote a book with the name of the show. Later he resumed the conduction of the programme which continues to be one of Peru's most viewed late-night shows.
