= Amaranta Kun =

Peruvian actress (born 1993)

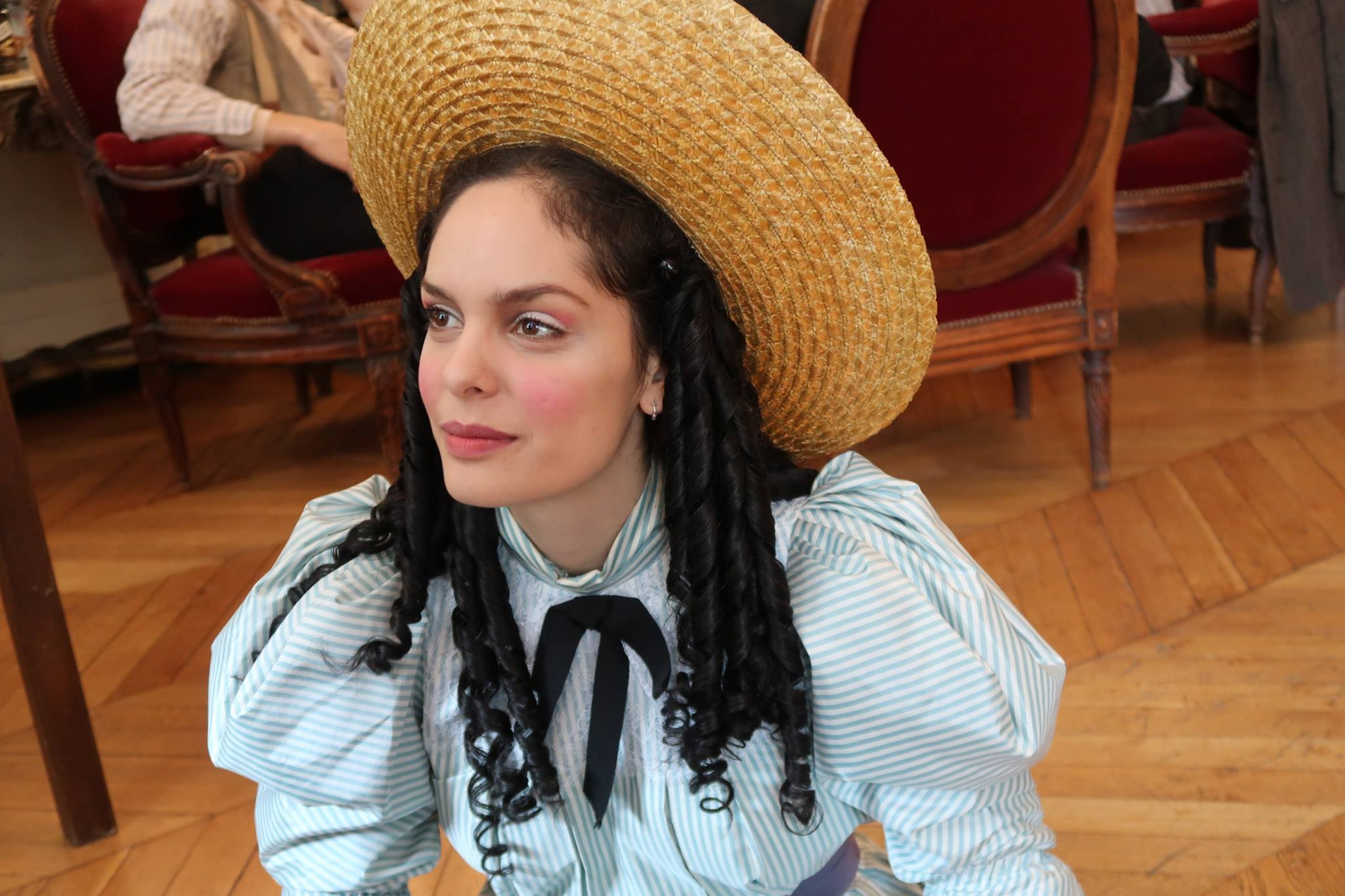
- Kun at the Comédie Française in 2017
- Born: Amaranta Asiri Kun Radovic; December 10, 1993 (age 32); Lima, Peru
- Occupation: Actress
- Years active: 2006–present
- Spouse: Rafael Velarde Balarezo
- Website: www.amarantakun.com

Amaranta Asiri Kun Radovic (born 10 December 1993) is an Italian-Peruvian actress established in Lima, Peru.

== Life and career ==
Granddaughter of Vlado Radovich, an actor and producer known for Natacha and Simplemente Maria, she studied at the Franco-Peruvian School Lycée Franco-Péruvien, where she showed a vocation for stage arts since age five, acting and directing in school plays, improv groups, courses and workshops in theater, ballet and contemporary dance. At the age of 10 she was cast in the movie The Trial by Peruvian director Judith Vélez.

Her first starring role was in the America Televisión's 2014 miniseries Camino al Triunfo, a TV show about the rise of Latin American lightweight boxing champion Jonathan Maicelo. After finishing production she moved to Lyon to study acting at the ENSATT under the direction of Philippe Delaigue. In 2016 she passed an audition to be a part of the Comédie Française as an academic actress where she performed in their world premiere for Pathé Live.

She currently resides in Peru, where she participates in several theatrical projects. In 2021, she became a founding member of A Mí No Me La Hacen, Peru's first media literacy association, providing workshops in schools, universities and institutes all around her country. In 2021, this association won a prize at UNESCO's Global MIL Awards.

== Filmography ==
=== Films ===
Year	Title	Role	Notes
2006	The Trial	Young Miranda	Best Script and Film - Schermi D’Amore Films Festival – Verona 2007 Best Opera Prima - International Film Festival – Santa Cruz 2007
2024	Chabuca	Magda Molina	Movie about the life of Ernesto Pimentel.
2024	Mistura	Juliette Sezane	Movie starring Bárbara Mori y Christian Meier.
2025	I Love Peru	As self	Mockumentary directed by Raphaël Quenard y Hugo David .

=== Television ===
Year	Title	Role	Notes
2014	Camino al Triunfo	Karina	Miniserie sobre la vida del boxeador Jhonatan Maicelo para América TV.
2022	Junta de Vecinos	Jimena Galindo	Serie para América TV

=== Short Films ===
Year	Title	Role	Notes
2013	Route 168	Widow	2013 Cannes Festival Shortfilm corner selection

=== Radio ===
Year	Title	Role	Notes
2017	The Adventures of Tintin – The Seven Crystal Balls	Raskar Kapac / Speaker Voice	Radio drama for Radio France

=== Music Videos ===
Year	Title	Role	Notes
2020	Ads!	Director	Directed the music video for the band Putzy.
2020	Lero Lero	Auctioneer	Malucci's official music video
2021	La Casa Que la Noche Nos Construyó	Protagonist	Blacktony Startano's official music video
2022	France$ka	Protagonist	Temple Sour's official music video

== Theatre ==
=== Comédie Française ===
Performances at the Comédie Française:

- 2016: Luchino Visconti's The Damned by Ivo van Hove
- 2016: William Shakespeare's Romeo and Juliet by Éric Ruf
- 2016: Victor Hugo's Lucrèce Borgia by Denis Podalydès
- 2016: Molière's The Misanthrope by Clément Hervieu-Léger
- 2017: Jean Renoir's The Rules of the Game by Christiane Jatahy
- 2017: Bertolt Brecht's The Resistible Rise of Arturo Ui by Katharina Thalbach
- 2017: Georges Feydeau's L'Hôtel du libre échange by Isabelle Nanty
- 2017: Edmond Rostand's Cyrano de Bergerac by Denis Podalydès
- 2017: Pierre de Marivaux's Double Inconstancy by Anne Kessler
- 2017: Robert Garnier's Hippolyte by Didier Sandre

=== As director ===
- 2022: Nuestros Cuerpos sin Memoria by Sarah Delaby-Rochette and Amaranta Kun for the Festival Temporada Alta

=== Other performances ===
- 2018: Molière's L'Amour médecin by Gérald Dumont
- 2022-2023: Molière's The Misanthrope by Jean Pierre Gamarra
- 2022: Joël Pommerat's Cendrillon by Gilbert Rouvière
- 2023: Oscar Wilde's Salome by Jean Pierre Gamarra
- 2023: Desbarranco by Claret Quea
- 2023: The Miser by Jean Pierre Gamarra
- 2024: One Life by Laurent Gutmann
- 2024: Tartuffe by Jean Pierre Gamarra
- 2024: Hamlet by Jean Pierre Gamarra
- 2024: The Solar System by Mariana De Althaus
- 2025: The Tenderness by Alfonso Santistevan
- 2025: The Threepenny Opera by Jean Pierre Gamarra
- 2025: The Barber of Seville by Jean Pierre Gamarra
- 2025: Cyrano de Bergerac by Jean Pierre Gamarra

== Awards and nominations ==
Año	Premios	Categoría	Trabajo	Resultado	Ref.
2022	El Oficio Crítico Awards	«Best Actress in a comedy»	The Misanthrope	Winner	
2023	El Oficio Crítico Awards	«Best actress in a comedy»	Desbarranco	Nominated	
2024	Teatro en el Perú Awards	«Best supporting actress»	El Tartufo	Nominated	
2024	El Oficio Crítico Awards	«Best comedy actress»	El Tartufo	Nominated	
2025	Luces El Comercio Awrds	«Best actress in a theater play»	Una Vida	Nominated	
