= El amor no es como lo pintan =

2000-2001 Mexican telenovela

- Directed by: Antulio Jiménez Pons
- Starring: Vanessa Acosta; Héctor Soberón; Arturo Beristáin; Gina Romand; Víctor González Reynoso; Sergio Klainer
- Opening theme: Reina de las diosas by Marcos Llunas
- Country of origin: Mexico
- Original language: Spanish
- No. of episodes: 175

Production
- Producers: Juan David Burns; Elisa Salinas
- Production location: Mexico
- Running time: 42 minutes
- Production company: TV Azteca

Original release
- Network: Azteca Trece
- Release: August 28, 2000 – April 27, 2001

Related
- Elias, inocentes y culpales (2000); Como en el cine (2001-2002)

El amor no es como lo pintan (transl. Love is not as it looks) is a Mexican telenovela produced by Juan David Burns and Elisa Salinas for TV Azteca. It was broadcast on Azteca Trece (now Azteca Uno) from Monday August 28, 2000 to Friday April 27, 2001 for 175 episodes. Contrary to popular belief, it was not an official remake of the popular Colombian telenovela, Yo soy Betty, la fea, but was merely an unauthorized ripoff created to capitalize on the popularity of the Colombian cultural phenomenon.

== Cast ==
- Vanessa Acosta .... Alicia "Licha" Ramírez Campos/Desiree Campos
- Héctor Soberón .... César Segovia / Felipe Sabatié
- Arturo Beristáin .... Gerardo Ramírez
- Rosenda Monteros .... María Elena Ramírez "Mamá Nena"
- Manuel Francisco Valdez .... Juanito Ramírez Campos
- José Loza .... Rolando Segovia
- Gina Romand .... Dunia Sabatié de Segovia, villain, but turns good
- Víctor González Reynoso .... Alberto Segovia, villain
- Sergio Klainer .... Manuel Segovia
- Aarón Beas .... Jorge Segovia
- Eva Prado .... Silvia Segovia
- Gina Moret .... Clotilda Campos/Clotilda Silva de Napoli
- Vanessa Villela .... Cynthia Rico
- Rodolfo Arias .... Pablo Rico
- Elizabeth Guindi .... Martha de Rico
- Kenya Mori .... Alma de Galán
- Andrés Palacios .... Jaime Galán Valdés
- Regina Torné .... Engracia Perez Ovando
- Miguel Couturier .... Enrique Alvarado
- Nubia Martí .... Carolina Alvarado
- Betty Monroe .... Marisela Aguilera, villain, turns good
- Carmen del Valle .... Sonia de Aguilera
- Nur .... Susana "Susy" Oviedo
- Rodrigo Cachero .... Javier Batres
- Bárbara Eibenshutz .... Cecilia Batres
- Rodrigo Mejía .... José González
- Roberto Medina .... Rafael Ávila
- Mercedes Olea .... Carmen
- Ana La Salvia .... Lena
- Dunia Saldívar .... Nana Paquita
- René Campero .... Padre Adriano
- Germán Valdés III .... Mariano
- Joanydka Mariel .... Luciana
- Enoc Leaño .... Mario
- Guillermo Murray .... Jose Maria, villain
- Carlos East Jr. .... Andrés
- Pablo Azar .... Popo
- Susana Alexander .... Daniela
- Martha Itzel....Chayito

== Legacy ==
Esti HaMekho'eret, an Israeli series (2003-2006, Channel 2), has been said to be based on El amor no es como lo pintan.
