= Ricardo de Montreuil =

Peruvian film director (born 1974)

- Born: May 17, 1974 (age 52); Miraflores District, Lima, Peru
- Occupations: Film director, producer, screenwriter
- Spouse: Marisa Wenner
- Children: Tiaré de Montreuil
- Parent(s): Ricardo de Montreuil and Carolina Iturri
- Website: ricardodemontreuil.com

Ricardo de Montreuil (born May 17, 1974) is a Peruvian filmmaker. He is best known for directing the drama films My Brother's Wife (2005), Máncora (2008), Lowriders (2016), and the historical melodrama film Mistura (2024).

== Biography ==
=== Early life ===
Born in Lima, Peru, de Montreuil was raised in the coastal city of Trujillo, a midsize city in north Peru. He is the son of Ricardo de Montreuil and Carolina Iturri. As a child, de Montreuil studied painting at the Trujillo Fine Arts School and later he was trained by the renowned Peruvian painter Pedro Azabache. After finishing high-school in Trujillo, de Montreuil travel to the United States to study film. De Montreuil graduated from the Savannah College of Art and Design with a BA in Graphic Design, an MA in Graphic Design and a minor in Film and Art History. He later studied directing under Judith Weston in Los Angeles.

=== Film ===
For his first short film Amiga, de Montreuil received a Creative Achievement Award at the Festival du Film de Paris and was the recipient of a Jury Selection prize at the Biarritz Film Festival.

His debut feature film, La mujer de mi hermano (My Brother's Wife), based on a novel by the controversial Peruvian author Jaime Bayly, was acquired by distributors Twentieth Century Fox for distribution in Latin America, and by Lionsgate for US theatrical distribution. My Brother's Wife is one of the most successful films in the history of Latin American exhibition, and enjoyed both the largest release and biggest opening weekend box-office for a Latin film in the US at the time. The film features some of Latin America's leading actors, including Bárbara Mori, Christian Meier, Manolo Cardona, Angélica Aragón, Beto Cuevas and Bruno Bichir.

His film Mancora was selected for competition in the World Drama category at the Sundance Film Festival 2008. The film cast includes Elsa Pataky, Enrique Murciano, Jason Day, Phellipe Haagensen and Liz Gallardo. Mancora was also invited and presented to be screened at South by Southwest film festival by Elizabeth Avellan, producer of Sin City and Grindhouse. Mancora was also selected at several other prestigious films festivals around the world, such as Edinburgh International Film Festival, Mill Valley Film Festival, Stockholm International Film Festival, São Paulo International Film Festival, Seattle International Film Festival, Los Angeles Latino International Film Festival, Miami International Film Festival and Bergen International Film Festival.

His next short film The Raven was released in 2010. The story revolved around a man that possesses a power that could lead to the destruction of the current regime, and they will stop at nothing to destroy him. Universal has acquired the rights to The Raven. Mark Wahlberg is producing the feature-length project alongside partner Steve Levinson in what is being developed as a starring vehicle for the actor.

=== Print ===
De Montreuil's first job out of college was as Art Director for Contents, an art magazine published in Savannah, Georgia. De Montreuil's first task was to redesign the whole magazine, and to come up with a new grid for it. That issue was published in Print magazine as one of the best works from the region. Since then the magazine has won several awards for its design. Contents a consistent winner in the annual design competitions of Print magazine, Communication Arts magazine and the Society of Publication Designers' Print magazine. PDN (Photo District News) honored Contents magazine on an Award of Merit for Design Excellence in their annual issue of editorial design. The magazine still makes use of de Montreuil's design and grid 10 years after his departure from the magazine.

=== Television ===
De Montreuil has also enjoyed success in the music video world. He has directed videos for such leading artists as Andrea Echeverri, Plastilina Mosh and Nicole. Plastilina Mosh's music video "Peligroso Pop" was nominated for Best Alternative Video at the MTV Video Music Awards Latin America in 2003 and Nicole's music video "Vida" was selected for the South by Southwest film festival.

De Montreuil has also been active in the world of television commercial directing. He directed several commercial spots for "Truth", a nationwide anti-tobacco campaign, and was the first Latin director invited to participate in the campaign. He has directed spots for a wide range of major companies including Coca-Cola, McDonald's and MTV. His commercials for Hewlett Packard were nominated at the Cannes Lions Advertising Festival in France. He has also won several Promax and BDA awards for his achievement in television creative and art direction.

De Montreuil is currently Creative Director at newly launched NBC Universal channel Mun2. Since his involvement with the company began, the channel has had massive ratings growth. Prior to this, De Montreuil was Senior Creative at MTV Networks Latin America for many years, where he oversaw the overall promotional design and content of MTV channels throughout the Latin American region.

De Montreuil was selected as one of Advertising Age's 40 Under 40 of 2006 and one of the 10 Hispanic raising starts in Hollywood according to Hispanic magazine in its 2008 entertainment issue.

== Filmography ==
=== Feature films ===
- My Brother's Wife La mujer de mi hermano (2005)
- Mancora (2008)
- Lowriders (2016)
- Mistura (2024)

=== Short films ===
- The Raven (2010)
- La Amiga (2003)
