= Mistura =

- Theatrical release poster
- Directed by: Ricardo de Montreuil
- Written by: Ricardo de Montreuil
- Produced by: Ivan Orlic
- Starring: Bárbara Mori; Cesar Ballumbrosio
- Cinematography: Nicolás Wong
- Edited by: Luis Colina; Ricardo de Montreuil
- Music by: Tim Williams
- Production company: Seine Pictures
- Release dates: October 8, 2024 (MVFF); August 21, 2025 (Peru)
- Running time: 101 minutes
- Country: Peru
- Languages: Spanish; French
- Box office: $31,558

Mistura is a 2024 Peruvian historical melodrama film written, co-edited and directed by Ricardo de Montreuil. Starring Bárbara Mori and Cesar Ballumbrosio, the film also features a special appearance by Christian Meier. It follows a woman who, after being abandoned by her husband, faces the challenges of opening a luxury restaurant in Lima's elite society.

== Synopsis ==
Norma suffers from her husband's abandonment and the scorn of the elitist society of Lima, Peru, in the 1960s. However, she, along with several people from marginalized communities, launches a project: opening a restaurant.

== Cast ==
The actors participating in this film are:

- Bárbara Mori as Norma Piet
- Christian Meier as Roberto Tapia
- Cesar Ballumbrosio as Oscar Lara
- Stefano Meier as Gerardo Tapia
- Juan Pablo Olyslager as José Eyzaguirre
- Hermelinda Luján as Rosa Condor
- Vanessa Saba as Mariana Woodman
- Marco Zunino as Kiko Ledgard
- Luciana Di Laura as Lucia
- Junior Bejar as Juano
- Priscila Espinoza as Bohemian Girl
- Jesús Aranda as Bank Guard
- Amaranta Kun as Juliette Sezane
- Sandro Calderón as Policeman
- Monserrat Brugué as Perm Lady
- Mariana Vilchez as Waitress
- Josue Subáustue as Octavio Cóndor
- Susie Dragañac as Restaurant client

== Release ==
Mistura had its world premiere on October 8, 2024, at the 47th Mill Valley Film Festival, then screened on October 12, 2024, at the 32nd Hamptons International Film Festival, on October 19, 2024, at the 25th Newport Beach Film Festival, on October 21, 2024, at the 22nd Morelia International Film Festival, on February 15, 2025, at the 40th Santa Barbara International Film Festival, on March 7, 2025, at the 20th Durango Independent Film Festival, on April 11, 2025, at the Sarasota Film Festival, on August 14, 2025, at the 29th Lima Film Festival, and on September 21, 2025, at The Valley Film Festival in Los Angeles.

The film was commercially released on August 21, 2025, in Peruvian theaters.

== Accolades ==
Year	Award / Festival	Category	Recipient	Result	Ref.
2024	25th Newport Beach Film Festival	Best Feature Narrative	Mistura	Won	
2024	25th Newport Beach Film Festival	Best Feature Narrative Screenplay	Mistura	Won	
2024	25th Newport Beach Film Festival	Best Feature Narrative Actress	Bárbara Mori	Won	
2025	20th Durango Independent Film Festival	Jury Award – Best Narrative Feature	Mistura	Won	
2025	20th Durango Independent Film Festival	Jury Award – Best Performance Female Actor Narrative Feature	Bárbara Mori	Won	
2025	20th Durango Independent Film Festival	Audience Award – Best Narrative Feature Film	Mistura	Won	
2025	Sarasota Film Festival	Best Narrative Feature	Mistura	Won	
2025	30th Stony Brook Film Festival	Jury Award – Best Feature	Mistura	Won	
