= Paradise (2013 Mexican film) =

- Theatrical release poster
- Directed by: Mariana Chenillo
- Screenplay by: Mariana Chenillo
- Based on: Paraíso y otros cuentos incómodos by Julieta Arévalo
- Produced by: Pablo Cruz; Gael García Bernal; Julian Levin; Diego Luna; Marta Núñez Puerto; Vanessa Perez; Arturo Sampson; Aura Santamaria
- Starring: Andrés Almeida; Daniela Rincón
- Production companies: Canana Films; EFICINE 226; Fidecine
- Distributed by: Videocine
- Release dates: September 8, 2013 (TIFF); July 3, 2014 (Mexico)
- Running time: 105 minutes
- Country: Mexico
- Language: Spanish

Paradise (Spanish: Paraíso) is a 2013 Mexican romantic comedy-drama film written and directed by Mariana Chenillo. It features Andrés Almeida and Daniela Rincón. It is based on the first tale of the book Paraíso y otros cuentos incómodos by Julieta Arévalo.

== Synopsis ==
Carmen and Alfredo have been dating since high school and live in Ciudad Satélite, where they are safe from having to fit into a society obsessed with the perfect body, despite the fact that they are both obviously overweight. But when Alfredo is offered a new job and they move to Mexico City, Carmen decides to change her body and that of her husband. As one of the two loses weight at a rapid rate, an inevitable chasm yawns between them.

== Cast ==
The actors participating in this film are:

- Andrés Almeida as Alfredo
- Daniela Rincón as Carmen
- Camila Selser as Marta
- Beatriz Moreno as Carmen's mom
- José Sefami as Carmen's father
- Mario Escalante as Biker
- Miryam Gallego as Pili
- Daniel Haddad as Esteban
- Octavio Lopez as Production Assistant
- Luis Gerardo Méndez
- Tania Palacios

== Release ==
Paradise had its international premiere on September 8, 2013, at the Toronto International Film Festival. It was commercially released on July 3, 2014, in Mexican theaters.

== Reception ==
=== Critical reception ===
Lucero Solórzano from Excelsior highlights the simplicity of the script and that it is not necessarily something negative, since it does not seek to judge or indoctrinate obese people, but rather merely tells a love story between 2 beings seeking to escape the sensation of "not fitting in", being fresh in the first act and despite the fact that the second act slows down, one can forgive him for the charisma of the leading duo.

=== Accolades ===
Year	Award	Category	Recipient	Result	Ref.
2014	Oslo Films from the South Festival	Silver Mirror Award	Mariana Chenillo	Nominated	
2015	Diosas de Plata	Best Newcomer - Female	Daniela Rincón	Nominated	
2015	Diosas de Plata	Best Supporting Actor	Luis Gerardo Méndez	Nominated	
2015	Diosas de Plata	Best Music	Darío González Valderrama	Nominated	
