= The Mongolian Conspiracy =

- Theatrical release poster
- Directed by: Sebastián del Amo
- Written by: Sebastián del Amo
- Based on: The Mongolian Conspiracy by Rafael Bernal
- Produced by: Sebastian del Amo; Carolina Amador; Sergio Ley; Alejandro Barron; Leonardo Cordero; María De Jesús García Reyes
- Starring: Damián Alcázar; Bárbara Mori; Eugenio Derbez; Xavier 'Chabelo' López
- Cinematography: Alejandro Cantú
- Edited by: Sebastian del Amo; Branko Gomez Palacio
- Music by: Gus Reyes; Andrés Sánchez; Dan Zlotnik
- Production company: Cine Qua Non Films
- Distributed by: Cinépolis Distribución
- Release dates: October 26, 2018 (FICG in LA); April 18, 2019 (Mexico)
- Running time: 100 minutes
- Country: Mexico
- Languages: Spanish; English; Russian
- Budget: $25 million Mexican pesos
- Box office: $985,589

The Mongolian Conspiracy (Spanish: El complot Mongol, lit. 'The mongol plot') is a 2018 Mexican neo-noir black comedy thriller film written and directed by Sebastián del Amo. Starring Damián Alcázar, Bárbara Mori, Eugenio Derbez and Xavier 'Chabelo' López. It is based on the crime novel of the same name by Rafael Bernal.

== Synopsis ==
Filiberto García is a judicial policeman who will have to investigate and dismantle a criminal case: China has a plan to assassinate John F. Kennedy during his visit to Mexico City.

== Cast ==
The actors participating in this film are:

- Damián Alcázar as Filiberto García
- Bárbara Mori as Martita Fong
- Eugenio Derbez as Rosendo del Valle
- Xavier 'Chabelo' López as The Coronel
- Roberto Sosa as The Graduate
- Ari Brickman as Richard Graves
- Moisés Arizmendi as Iván M. Laski
- Rodrigo Murray as General Crispín Miraflores
- Gustavo Sánchez Parra as Fu Manchú
- Lisa Owen as Annabella Crawford
- Hector Kotsifakis as Luciano Manrique
- Salvador Sánchez as Mr. Liu
- Enrique Arreola as "El Sapo"
- Ramón Medína as Roque Villegas
- Beng Zeng Wong as Javier Liú
- Dobrina Cristeva as Russian Spy
- Hugo Stiglitz as Himself
- Diana Lein as Esther Ramírez
- Mauricio Isaac as The receptionist
- Sebastian del Amo as Gringo Spy 1
- Alejandro Barron as Gringo Spy 2
- Eugenio Elizondo as Bartender

== Production ==
Principal photography began on August 17, 2017 and ended on September 19 of the same year in Mexico City.

== Release ==
The Mongolian Conspiracy had its world premiere on October 26, 2018, at the 8th Guadalajara International Film Festival in Los Angeles. It had its commercial premiere on April 18, 2019, in Mexican theaters.

== Reception ==
=== Critical reception ===
On the review aggregator website Rotten Tomatoes, 45% of 11 critics' reviews are positive, with an average rating of 5.9/10.

Arturo Magaña from Cine Premiere praised the acting work of the main cast, especially the performance of Damián Alcázar who manages to play a fun and wild role. It also positively highlights the script work that takes up elements of national black cinema. On the other hand, Rafael Rosales Santos from Konexion criticizes the plot of the film that becomes incoherent because of its director, the editing full of cuts that makes it uncomfortable and subtracts the performances from the cast, and the photography full of close-ups that makes it uncomfortable.

=== Accolades ===
Year	Award / Festival	Category	Recipient	Result	Ref.
2018	Guadalajara International Film Festival in Los Angeles	Best Actor	Damián Alcázar	Won	
2019	Guadalajara International Film Festival	Best Mexican Long Feature Film	Sebastian del Amo	Nominated	
2020	Ariel Awards	Best Supporting Actress	Bárbara Mori	Nominated	
2020	Ariel Awards	Best Costume Design	Cynthia López	Nominated	
2020	Ariel Awards	Best Makeup	Mari Paz Robles & Cristian Perez Jauregui	Nominated	
2020	Ariel Awards	Best Adapted Screenplay	Sebastian del Amo	Nominated	
