= Kenya Mori =

Mexican actress (born 1976)

- Born: January 15, 1976 (age 50); Montevideo, Uruguay
- Occupation: Actress
- Years active: 1998–2009
- Relatives: Bárbara Mori (sister)

Kenya Mori (born Kenya Mori Ochoa on January 15, 1976, in Montevideo, Uruguay) is a Uruguayan-born Mexican actress. Mori studied acting in TV Azteca's Centro de Formación Actoral.

== Filmography ==
Telenovelas, Films
Year	Title	Role	Notes
1998-99	Tres Veces Sofía		Telenovela
1999	Romántica Obsesión		
2000	El precio de nuestra sangre	Annabella	Film
2000-01	El amor no es como lo pintan	Alma de Galán	Supporting Role
2002	La banda de los tanditos		Film
2003	El secreto oculto	Mariana	Film
2003	Enamórate	Jimena	Supporting Role
2003-04	La Hija del Jardinero	Carolina "Carol" de la Vega	Supporting Role
2006-08	Decisiones	Selena/Elsa	2 Episodes
