= Silvia Núñez del Arco =

Peruvian writer and journalist

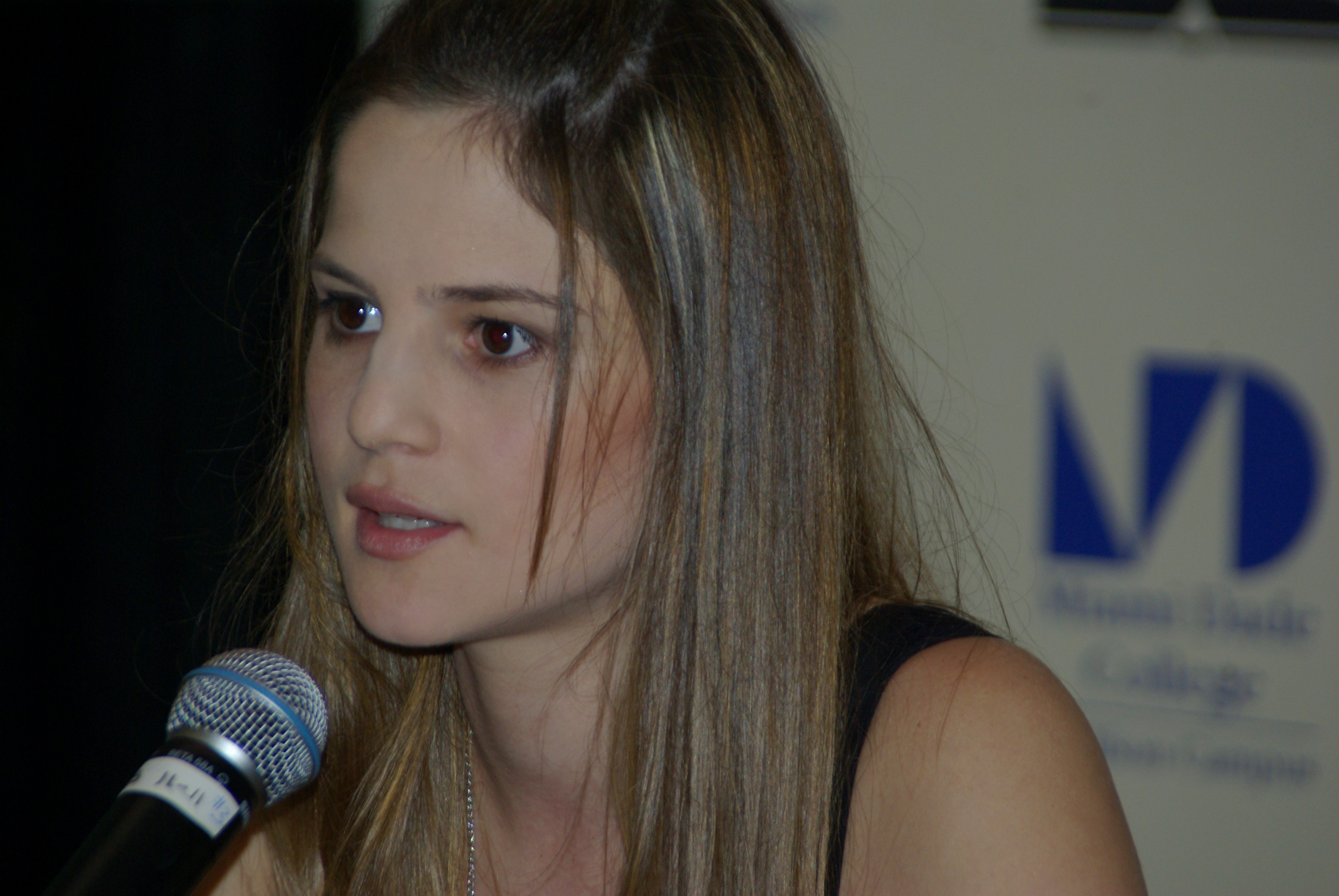
- Peruvian writer Silvia Nuñez del Arco at the Miami International Book Fair 2011
- Born: 8 November 1988 (age 37); Lima, Peru
- Education: University of Lima (incomplete)
- Occupation: Author
- Spouse: Jaime Bayly (m. 2011)
- Children: 1
- Writing career
- Period: 2010–present

Silvia Núñez del Arco Vidal is a Peruvian writer and wife of journalist Jaime Bayly.

== Biography ==
The daughter of José Fernando Núñez del Arco Drago and Silvia Adriana Vidal González-Orbegoso, she studied at the Deutsche Schule Lima Alexander von Humboldt in Lima and later entered Psychology at the University of Lima, but dropped out after a few months, dedicating herself to writing.

According to the magazine Cosas, she met Jaime Bayly at the age of 18, during one of her visits to the set of El francotirador TV show. "After reading almost all of his books, admiration for the writer had arisen in her, not so much for the showman," he says, "the problem is that the program was over and they were face to face." Jaime noticed that Silvia was not going for an autograph, so the conversation flowed like that of two strangers who greet each other for the first time in any café. Silvia was 18 years old and had recently finished a relationship of 4 years. Jaime was in a relationship with Luis Corbacho, Argentine journalist. In that 2010 interview, asked if she was affected by Bayly's bisexuality, she replied that she likes "men who have that feminine sensibility".

In January 2010, she made public the relationship she had with Bayly. Months later she became pregnant by the writer and the couple married in April 2011 in Miami, Florida. Silvia gave birth to Zoe Bayly the same month. Since the end of 2010, the couple resides on the island of Key Biscayne in Miami.

She debuted in literature in 2010, with the novel What others do not see, in which she narrates her romance with Bayly. The following year her second book There is a girl in my soup was released, starring, like the first, by Lucia, her alter ego, who in this work is attracted erotically to her German teacher. In 2012, she published The Man Who Took A Long Time To Love, an erotic novel inspired by Fifty Shades of Gray and which, according to the author, is a reflection of her own fantasies.

== Works ==
- Lo que otros no ven [What others do not see] (in Spanish). Grupo Editorial Mesa Redonda. 2010. ISBN 978-612-4062-01-8.
- Hay una chica en mi sopa [There is a girl in my soup] (in Spanish). Editorial Planeta. 2011. ISBN 9786124070211.
- El hombre que tardó en amar [Finally Finding Love] (in Spanish). Penguin Random House. 2012. ISBN 9780142427392.
