= The Trial (2006 film) =

- La prueba
- Directed by: Judith Vélez
- Written by: Augusto Cabada; Susan Rojas; Judith Vélez
- Produced by: Karen Carrillo; Ana María Roca-Rey; Judith Vélez
- Starring: Denisse Arreguí; Mario Bedoya; Eliana Borja
- Cinematography: Ricardo Rodríguez
- Edited by: Roberto Benavides
- Music by: Antonio Gervasoni
- Release date: May 2006 (Peru)
- Running time: 100 minutes
- Country: Peru
- Language: Spanish

'The Trial' (La prueba) is a 2006 Peruvian drama road movie written and directed by Judith Vélez and starring Jimena Lindo, Gianfranco Brero and Pietro Sibille. The picture premiered in the World Cinema section of the 30th Montreal World Film Festival in August 2006, and the following year received both the Calzedonia Prize and the Special Jury Award at Verona’s Schermi d’Amore festival.

== Plot summary ==
Miranda, a young Lima architect, discovers that the rare blood type of her long-absent father could save her gravely ill brother and sets out across southern Peru to find him. Travelling with hydraulic engineer Saúl, she crosses drought-stricken Andean landscapes, observing rituals that fuse Catholic processions with pre-Hispanic water ceremonies while confronting memories of political violence that fractured her family.

== Cast ==
- Denisse Arreguí
- Mario Bedoya
- Eliana Borja
- José Borja
- Gianfranco Brero
- Enrique Casella
- Carlos Gonzales
- Doris Guillén
- Willy Gutiérrez
- Amaranta Kun
- Jimena Lindo
- Miguel Angel Medina
- David Mendoza
- Miguel Medina
- Franco Miranda

== Awards and nominations ==
=== Won ===
Verona Love Screens Film Festival

- 2006: Best Film
- 2007: Best Film

=== Nominated ===
Cartagena Film Festival

- 2007: Best Film

Huelva Latin American Film Festival

- 2006: Golden Colon.”
