= Bárbara Anderson =

Argentinian journalist

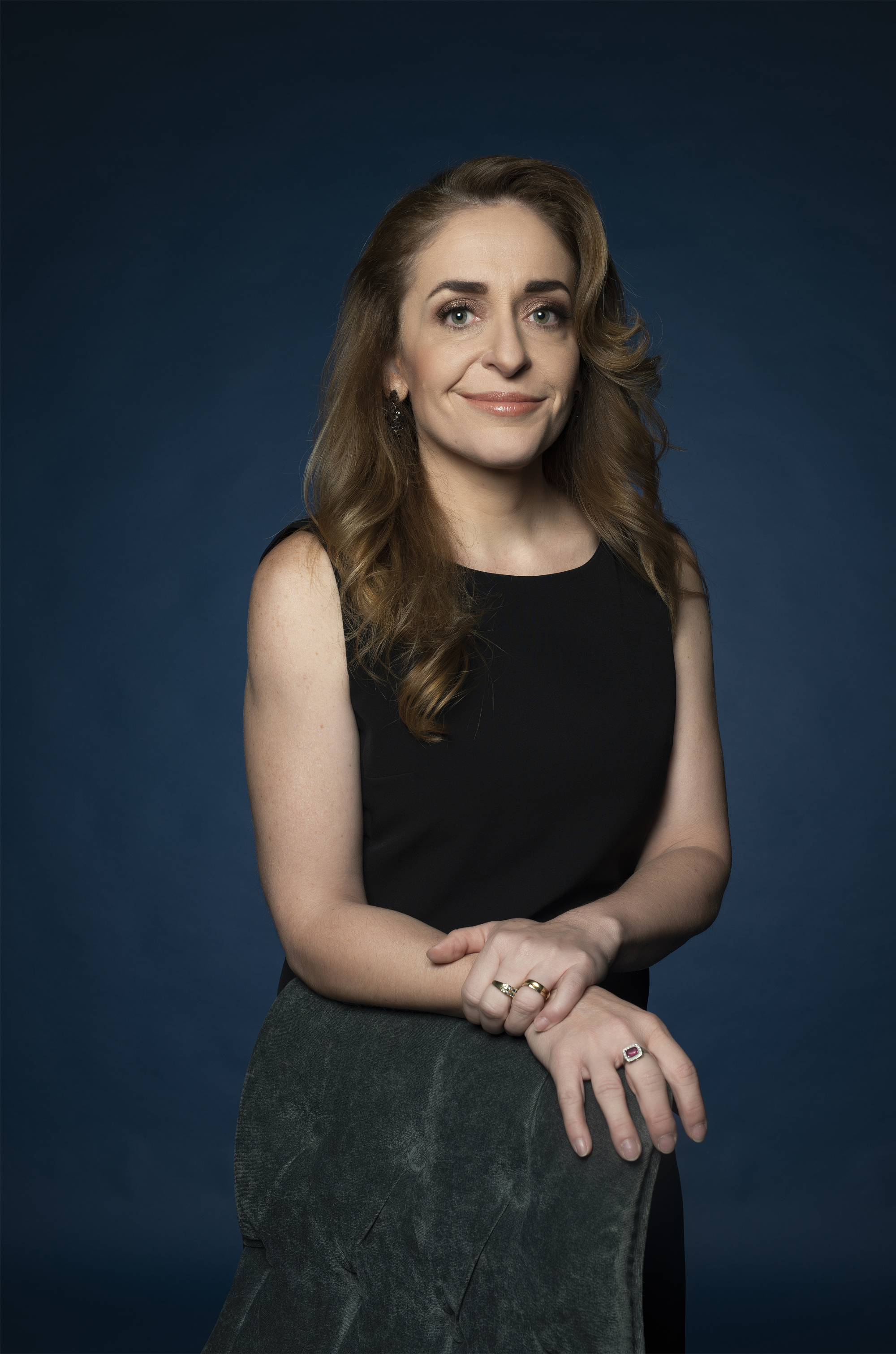
- Bárbara Anderson
- Born: December 4, 1973 (age 52)

Bárbara Anderson (born 4 December 1973) is an Argentine journalist and disability rights activist who has promoted significant legal changes regarding inclusion through the Yo También Association. She has gained recognition for her work as a business journalist in print, online, television, and radio media for local and transnational groups, as well as for her role as a speaker and advisor on issues of inclusion and accessibility.

== Career ==
Anderson began her journalism career in 1997 at various media outlets in Argentina as a reporter, and she advanced to editor-in-chief at the weekly magazine Punto a Punto y Mercado. In 2002, she relocated to Mexico City to join Grupo Editorial Expansión as the editor of the Ideas section.

She remained at this publishing house until 2014, during which she explored various forms of management and creativity through initiatives such as the redesign of the content generation process at Expansión, a model that was later adopted by Time Inc.

During her time at Expansión, she led the group of women's magazines. In that role, she promoted entrepreneurship with initiatives such as the Elle México design contest, which was broadcast as a reality show.

Since 2013, she served as director of editorial innovation at Grupo Milenio, where she reorganized the Business section, redesigned the Milenio.com portal, and renewed the company's set of supplements, which doubled revenue. She also incorporated the titles of the social magazine CHIC in Mexico, whose content is distributed nationwide, and closed an agreement with The Financial Times to edit the weekly supplement FT Mercado.

To complement her journalistic work, she created the Brand Journalism department, a unit in which companies produce content, with clients such as Monsanto, Bimbo, Laureate International México, UPs, Cinépolis, and Uber, as well as the Milenio Foros platform, a forum for debates. She hosted the television program Milenio Negocios for eight years, a weekly series of interviews with businesspeople, executives, and representatives from the financial sector in Mexico, which is broadcast on Milenio TV. She was the author until October 2020 of the column "Nada personal, solo negocios" (translation: "Nothing personal, only business"), on current business topics, from which an informational capsule, Radar Anderson, is produced.

During the COVID-19 pandemic in Mexico, she organized and brought the Spanish edition of The Guardian to Mexico, for which she created a Mexican news platform, La-Lista—a digital medium with a strong focus on human rights, inclusion, diversity, and the environment. La-Lista/The Guardian was launched on January 1, 2021, with a large group of reporters, editors, and columnists who operated the first website with a virtual newsroom established during the coronavirus crisis.

She is currently a columnist at the Opinión 51 portal and in the magazine Expansión. She has been a correspondent in Mexico since 2002 for the largest radio network in Argentina, Cadena 3.

== Publications ==
In 2019, she wrote her first book, Los dos hemisferios de Lucca. Published by Penguin Random House, it is an autobiography about her life with her son who has cerebral palsy and the results of an experimental treatment that he underwent in India. The book was presented at the Guadalajara International Book Fair. After several re-editions, it was launched in 2022 in the Argentine market. In 2023, Netflix announced the acquisition of the rights to the work to produce a film with the same title for 190 markets worldwide. The screenplay adaptation is by Javier Peñalosa, and the film is directed by Mariana Chenillo. The lead roles are played by actors Bárbara Mori and Juan Pablo Medina.

Her second book, (IN)visibles, was published in 2022 and was presented at the International Book Fair in Monterey and at the Guadalajara International Book Fair. It is a first-person account of 24 Mexicans with disabilities who achieved their dreams. It features athlete Jorge Font, politician Claudia Anaya, businesspeople, artists, and photographer Enrique Covarrubias, who is the author of the photographs in the book. The presentation in October 2023 in Mexico City was accompanied by an extensive display: an outdoor gallery on Avenida Paseo de la Reforma featuring all of Enrique Covarrubias' photographs and brief biographies of each protagonist. An accessible exhibition—with Braille information cards—was visited by approximately 650,000 people since its inauguration on October 17 and remained on display until November 14 and a large projection of images on the south wall of the World Trade Center, on a 5,000-square-meter screen (the largest in Latin America) by the company Huge Board. The projection could be seen up to 5 kilometers around from various points in the city, reaching an audience of 450,000 people. The book won a Silver Medal at the Latino Book Awards 2023 for Most Inspirational Nonfiction Book – Spanish, and a Silver Medal for Best Website Promoting a Book.

Cómo se dice is a dictionary of disability terminology for journalists, communicators, and editors who are communicating stories about disability. It also includes tips for making editorial content accessible. The book is free and downloadable, as it was sponsored by private brands.

== Other activities ==
In May 2019, she launched Yo también, a newsletter featuring news about disability, the first such publication in the country and in Latin America. It is the only news site whose website is 100% accessible throughout the country, allowing all people to access daily information from and about disability. This portal is focused on all types of information (from education to sports, including entertainment, science, or health) that involves this population, which represents 16.5% of the national total. In addition to its journalistic content, this civil association succeeded in ensuring that the topic of inclusion was given an entire chapter in the Telecommunications Reform. It also played a role in the new Law on the Rights of Girls, Boys, and Adolescents and in the incorporation of full inclusion in the Education Reform, ensuring that within 13 years, all schools in Mexico will be 100% inclusive in terms of content, infrastructure, and accessibility. This initiative was reinforced in the following six-year administration, during the tenure of Esteban Moctezuma.

In 2016, she ensured that an act of discrimination against her son Lucca, who has cerebral palsy, led to an unprecedented alliance between CONAPRED and PROFECO, and promoted an alliance with HearColors, a company specialized in making websites inclusive to achieve digital accessibility. In 2019, she also filed a lawsuit against Ticketmaster for its lack of accessibility in ticket sales, an action that first led to changes in Mexico, starting with the Auditorio Nacional and later served as a starting point for the company to implement it in the rest of the countries where it operates.

For these activities and public advocacy efforts, she received the Journalist for Social Change Award in 2020 from the Universidad del Valle de México.

Bárbara Anderson is a member of the International Women’s Forum, Mexico chapter, and she has served as a moderator at various forums, including Internet Day, which was led by President Enrique Peña Nieto as well as in events on inclusion and the rights of people with disabilities.

She is a member of the board of trustees of APAC IAP, Association for People with Cerebral Palsy of Mexico, where she serves as a treasurer.
