= All That Is Invisible =

- Theatrical release poster
- Directed by: Mariana Chenillo
- Written by: Mariana Chenillo; Ari Brickman
- Produced by: Pablo Garcia Gatterer; Alejandro Mares; Aura Santamaria
- Starring: Ari Brickman; Bárbara Mori; José María de Tavira
- Cinematography: Alejandro Cantú
- Music by: Ari Brickman
- Production company: Tigre Pictures
- Distributed by: Distribución Cinépolis
- Release dates: October 31, 2020 (FICM); April 22, 2021 (Mexico)
- Running time: 110 minutes
- Country: Mexico
- Language: Spanish
- Box office: $80,703

All That Is Invisible (Spanish: Todo lo invisible) is a 2020 Mexican comedy-drama film directed by Mariana Chenillo and written by Chenillo & Ari Brickman. Starring Ari Brickman, Bárbara Mori and José María de Tavira. It premiered internationally at the 18th Morelia International Film Festival where it was nominated for Best Mexican Feature Film.

== Synopsis ==
After suffering a car accident, a renowned dentist ends up blinded. Jonas will have to adapt where circumstances will lead him to discover other paths, hitherto unsuspected, in order to move forward.

== Cast ==
The actors participating in this film are:

- Ari Brickman as Jonas
- Bárbara Mori as Amanda
- José María de Tavira as Saúl
- Daniela Schmidt as Flor
- Tomás Owen as Víctor
- Melissa Rovira as Julia
- Romina Soto as Roberta
- Paloma Woolrich as Inés
- Delia Casanova as Socorro
- Diana Lein as Automotive Lawyer
- Fermín Martínez as Mustachioed Taxi Driver
- Giovani Florido as Claims manager
- Mildred Motta as Hotel receptionist
- Alejandro Lago as Bank executive
- Paola Flores as Juanita
- Angélica Vera Cruz as Pharmacy Girl

== Release ==
All That Is Invisible had its international premiere on October 31, 2020, at the 18th Morelia International Film Festival. It was commercially released on April 22, 2021, in Mexican theaters.

== Reception ==
=== Critical reception ===
Kevin de León from Tomatazos praises the performances of the main cast, highlighting Ari Brickman who manages to adequately convey the emotions of his characters and make us empathize with him. It also highlights the development of the script, which moves away from the clichés of the subject of blindness, and instead decides to build more of the characters and the conflict they face. On the other hand, Ricardo Gallegos from La Estatuilla acknowledges the acting level of the film, but criticizes the script for not correctly addressing the issues raised at the beginning, which makes the production just another entertainment.

=== Accolades ===
| Year | Award / Festival | Category | Recipient | Result | Ref. |
|---|---|---|---|---|---|
| 2020 | Morelia International Film Festival | Best Mexican Feature Film | Mariana Chenillo | Nominated | |
