= The Zombie Farm =

- Directed by: Ricardo Islas
- Written by: Ricardo Islas
- Produced by: Frederico Lapenda; Blaine McManus
- Starring: Adriana Cataño; Nadia Rowinsky; Khotan; Monika Munoz; Roberto Montesinos
- Cinematography: Christian Herrera
- Edited by: Joseph Langdale; David Pellenz
- Music by: Aritz Villodas
- Production companies: Maxim Entertainment; Paradigm Pictures
- Distributed by: Maya Entertainment
- Release date: March 8, 2011
- Running time: 90 minutes
- Country: United States
- Language: English

The Zombie Farm is a 2011 American zombie film written and directed by Ricardo Islas. It stars Adriana Cataño, Nadia Rowinsky, Khotan, Monika Munoz, and Monika Munoz. It is about a battered wife, con man, and documentary filmmaker who team up against a voodoo priestess.

== Plot ==
Ana Maria, a battered wife, seeks help from a local spiritualist, Roque. Impressed with Roque's community service and advocacy for women, a filmmaker, Pilar Franco, offers to make a documentary about him. Roque, however, is a fake and can offer Ana Maria little help beyond advice to leave her abusive relationship; Pilar is disgusted and denounces him as a con man.

In desperation, Ana Maria turns to Luna, a voodoo priestess, who warns her that her husband, Antonio, will be changed by the dark magic. To Ana Maria's surprise, Antonio is transformed into a mindless slave. Unsure what to do, Ana Maria returns to Roque and seeks his help once again. Roque and Pilar team up to help Ana Maria discover what happened to Antonio. Together, they learn that Luna is creating slave labor out of the immigrant community now that her supply of illegal immigrants has dried up. These zombies are put to work on Luna's farm and mindlessly follow her orders, including the murder of her enemies. A mix of Haitian voodoo and undead ghoul, the zombies are nearly impossible to destroy. Eventually, a botched spell destroys the zombies and Luna is killed. Roque and Pilar, who have come to respect each other, decide to work together to help the community.

== Cast ==
- Adriana Cataño as Pilar Franco
- Nadia Rowinsky as Luna
- Khotan as Antonio
- Monika Munoz as Ana Maria
- Roberto Montesinos as Roque

== Production ==
The Zombie Farm was shot in Louisiana. Both English and Spanish dialog were recorded at the same time.

== Release ==
Maya Entertainment released The Zombie Farm on DVD March 8, 2011.

== Reception ==
John Stanley of the San Francisco Chronicle rated it 3/5 stars and wrote that the film has an intriguing setup but becomes clichéd and incoherent once the voodoo element is introduced. Jeremy Blitz of DVD Talk rated it 2.5/5 stars and wrote that "the dollops of greatness are equally mixed with mediocrity." David Johnson of DVD Verdict called it "a well-executed little gem" that should have been played for laughs.
