= Dobrina Cristeva =

Mexican actress

- Born: Dobrina Liubomirova Stoylova Anguelova; October 9, 1968 (age 57); Sofia, Bulgaria
- Occupations: Actress, dancer
- Years active: 1981–present
- Spouse: Flavio González Mello (m. 1998)
- Children: 3

Dobrina Liubomirova Stoylova Anguelova known as Dobrina Cristeva (Spanish pronunciation: [doˈβɾina ˈkɾisteβa]; Bulgarian: Добрина Кръстева [doˈbrinɐ ˈkristɛvɐ]; October 9, 1968) is a Mexican actress. Born in Sofia, Bulgaria, she immigrated to Mexico in 1976, when she was 8 years old. She started her career as a dancer in 1981 and as an actress in 1988.

== Filmography ==
=== Film ===
- The Mongolian Conspiracy (2018) - Russian Spy
- Hasta que los cuernos nos separen (1995)
- La Dedicatoria (1992)
- Imperio de los malditos (1992)
- Playback (1992)
- Desvestidas y alborotadas (1991)
- Sólo con tu pareja (1991) - Silvia Silva
- Ciudad de ciegos (1991) - Fanny
- Alma negra, magia blanca (1991)

=== Television ===
- Como dice el dicho (2015) - Liliana
- La rosa de Guadalupe (2010-2019)
- Dejate Llevar - Greta (2010)
- Siempre Hay Un Motivo - Magda (2012)
- La Música Del Amor - Elizabeth (2013)
- Lo Que Es El Amor - Luisa (2014)
- Ladrona De Corazones - Virginia (2014)
- Contrato De Amor - Gabriela (2015)
- Bocanada De Amor - Leonor (2015)
- Camino Al Amor - Catalina (2017)
- Casa De Dos - Irma (2017)
- La Foto - Alfonsina (2018)
- Pasión Del Verdadero Amor - Eloísa (2018)
- El Jardín De Los Gnomos - Candelaria (2019)
- Muchacha italiana viene a casarse (2014 telenovela) 2014 - Belinda
- Teresa (2010) - Mayra
- Atrévete a soñar (2009) - Aura
- En nombre del amor (2008/2009 - Elisa
- Vecinos (2008) - Receptionist
- Tormenta en el Paraiso (2007) - Cleotilde
- Mujer, casos de la vida real (2006]) - Various episodes
- Rebelde (2004/2006) - Mabel Bustamante
- De pocas, pocas pulgas (2003) - Marisa
- Clase 406 (2002/2003) - Natalia Brech
- Lo que callamos las mujeres (2001) - Vivian
- Valentina (1993) - Débora
- Luces de la noche (1998) - Tina (Jovem)
- Los Vuelcos del corazón (1996)
