= Azul Tequila =

Mexican telenovela

- Genre: Telenovela
- Created by: Alfonso Acebal
- Written by: Alfonso Acebal; Jorge Landa
- Directed by: Humberto Zurita
- Starring: Bárbara Mori; Mauricio Ochmann
- Music by: Federico Chávez Blanco; Armando Manzanero
- Opening theme: Instrumental
- Country of origin: Mexico
- Original language: Spanish
- No. of episodes: 160

Production
- Producer: Zuba Producciones
- Cinematography: Carlos Guerra; Sergio Treviño
- Production companies: TV Azteca Digital; ZUBA Producciones

Original release
- Network: Azteca Trece
- Release: 1998

Azul Tequila is a Mexican telenovela. The 160-episode serial was produced for TV Azteca by the celebrity couple Christian Bach and Humberto Zurita in conjunction with Humberto's brother Gerardo through their production company ZUBA Producciones. The complete series has been released in an 8 DVD box set.

== Plot ==
Azul is a young woman in the end of the 19th century who has been forced to get engaged to Arcadio Berriozabal when she is in love with his brother Santiago Berriozabal. Before her wedding peasant revolution is started and she is kidnapped. Santiago, believing she is dead, creates one of the finest tequilas and calls it "Azul Tequila".

== Cast ==
- Bárbara Mori as Azul / Soledad
- Mauricio Ochmann as Santiago Berriozabal
- Víctor González as Arcadio Berriozabal
- Rogelio Guerra as Adolfo Berriozabal
- Leonardo Daniel as Mariano
- Fabiola Campomanes as Lorenza
- Úrsula Prats as Hilda
- Lorena Rojas as Catalina

== Reception ==
With an approximate cost of $5,000,000 United States dollars, this production was praised by the critics, but was not a great success with the Mexican audience. It was a successful telenovela in Europe, Asia, Malaysia, and Thailand. This was the first telenovela for Ursula Pratts with TV Azteca, and also the first in 10 years after Monte Calvario in 1988.

The series was also acquired by BBC Knowledge and was one of its launch shows in 1999 where it even had a dedicated website with content in both English and Spanish.
