= Somos. =

Mexican Netflix limited series

- Genre: Drama
- Created by: James Schamus
- Written by: James Schamus; Monika Revilla
- Directed by: Álvaro Curiel; Mariana Chenillo
- Starring: Mercedes Hernández; Jero Medina
- Composer: Victor Hernández Stumpfhauser
- Country of origin: Mexico
- Original language: Spanish
- No. of seasons: 1
- No. of episodes: 6

Production
- Executive producers: James Schamus; Sandra Solares
- Production location: Durango
- Cinematography: Ignacio Prieto
- Editor: Soledad Salfate

Original release
- Network: Netflix
- Release: 30 June 2021

Somos. is a Netflix limited series created by James Schamus and co-written with Monika Revilla and novelist Fernanda Melchor. It is based on the article "How the U.S. triggered a massacre in Mexico" by Pulitzer Prize-winning journalist Ginger Thompson. It tells the story of the massacre perpetrated by the Los Zetas cartel on the border town of Allende, Coahuila, in 2011.

== Plot ==
Somos. is a portrait of the Mexican border town of Allende. It follows the stories of various townspeople on the days leading up to the massacre of March 2011.

== Cast ==
- Jero Medina as Benjamín
- Arelí González as Érika
- Iliana Donatlán as Irene
- Everardo Arzate as Chema
- Caraly Sánchez as Flor María
- Mercedes Hernández as Doña Chayo
- Fernando Larrañaga as Isidro Linares
- Jesús Sida as Paquito

== Episodes ==
No.	Title	Directed by	Teleplay by	Original release date
1	"The Lazy Herd"	Álvaro Curiel	James Schamus	June 30, 2021
2	"A Mouth Full of Flies"	Álvaro Curiel	Monika Revilla	June 30, 2021
3	"Tell the Moon to Come"	Mariana Chenillo	Monika Revilla	June 30, 2021
4	"A Walk with Wolves"	Mariana Chenillo	Monika Revilla	June 30, 2021
5	"The Night Belongs to Us"	Álvaro Curiel	James Schamus	June 30, 2021
6	"Somos."	Álvaro Curiel	James Schamus	June 30, 2021
