= Mariana Chenillo =

Mexican film director and screenwriter

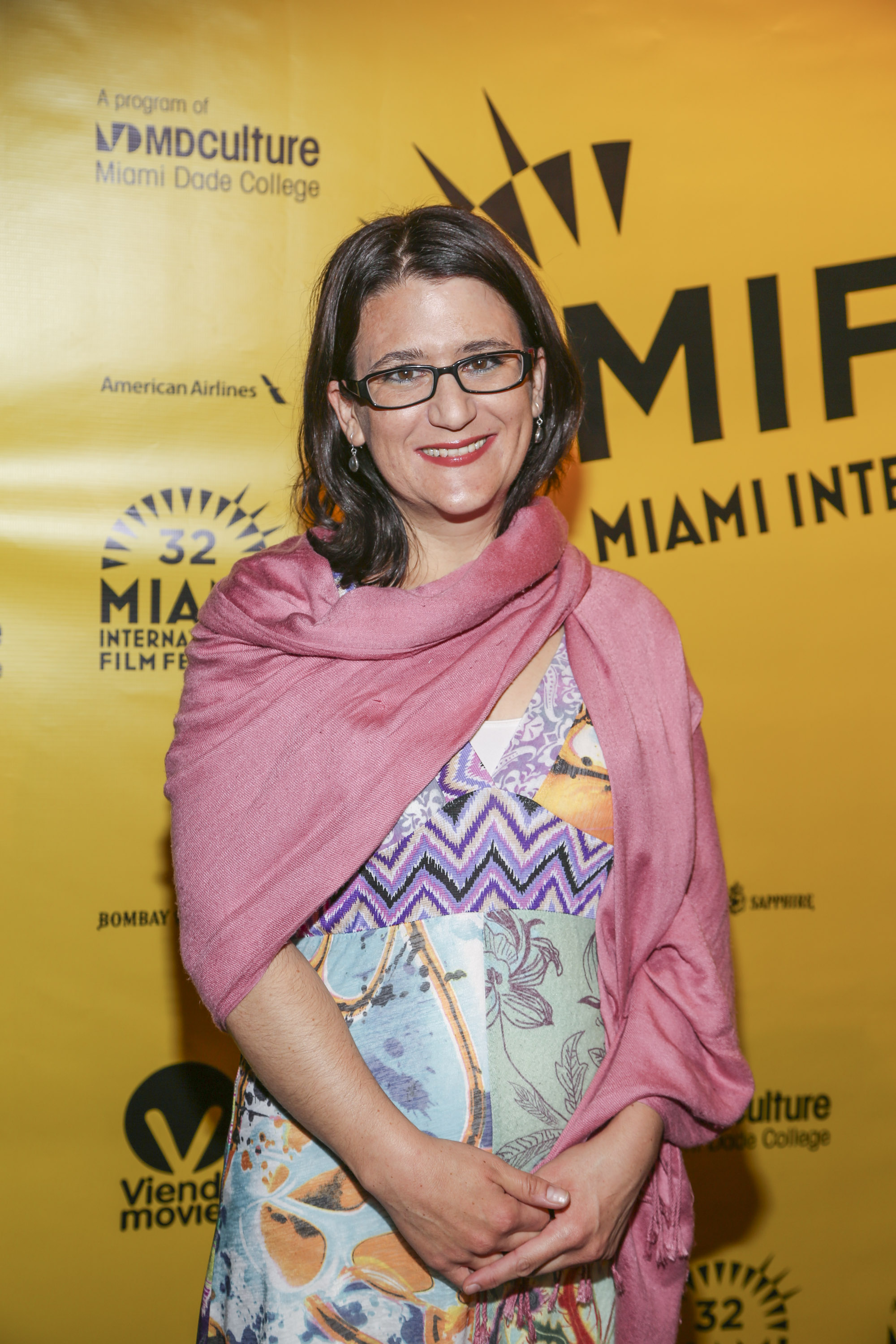
- Chenillo at the 2014 Miami International Film Festival
- Born: 29 April 1977 (age 49); Mexico City
- Occupations: Director, Screenwriter

Mariana Chenillo (born 29 April 1977 in Mexico City) is a Mexican film director and screenwriter, known for Nora's Will (2008), Paradise (2013) and Revolución (2010).

Chenillo is the first female filmmaker to have directed a Best Picture-winning film at Mexico's Ariel awards with Nora's Will, a comedy about the five days following Nora's suicide which she'd planned to bring her family back together. Her film Paradise showed what happens when an overweight couple moves from the middle-class suburban area of Naucalpan to Mexico City.

She directed episodes of Soy tu fan and Netflix' Club de Cuervos, and co-directed the Netflix limited series Somos..

== Selected filmography ==
- Nora's Will (Cinco días sin Nora) (2008)
- Revolución (2010)
- Paradise (Paraíso) (2013)
- All That Is Invisible (Todo lo invisible) (2020)
