= Jaime Bayly =

Peruvian–American Television personality (born 1965)

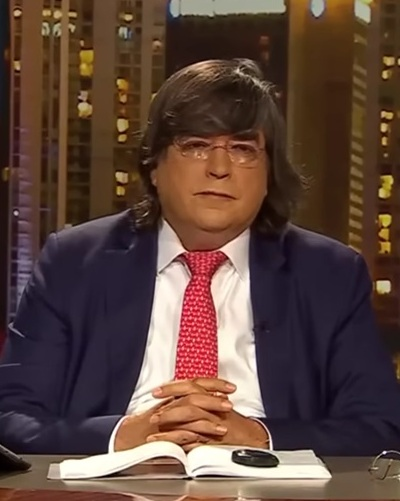
- Bayly in 2024
- Born: February 19, 1965 (age 61); Lima, Peru
- Citizenship: Peru; United States (since 1997)
- Occupations: Writer; journalist; television personality
- Spouses: Silvia Núñez del Arco (2011–present); Sandra Masías (1993–1997)
- Writing career
- Pen name: The (TV) Naughty Boy; El Niño Terrible (de la Televisión)
- Period: 1983–present
- Notable awards: Emmy Awards (1997, 2008, 2009); Premio Planeta de Novela (runner-up); Herralde Award (1997)
- Website: elfrancotirador.com (in Spanish)

Jaime Bayly Letts (Latin American Spanish pronunciation: [ˈxajme ˈβejli lets]) (born February 19, 1965) is a Peruvian writer, journalist, and television personality. He has won Emmy Award and two of his books have been adapted into international movies. He also won the Premio Herralde in 1997 for his novel La Noche es Virgen, a major literary award in the world of Spanish literature that has been granted to writers such as Roberto Bolaño, Mariana Enriquez, and Enrique Vila-Matas.

== Early life and education ==
Bayly was born to an upper-class Peruvian family in Lima. He was the first son and the third of eleven children of Jaime Bayly Llona and his wife, Doris Letts Colmenares. He is the nephew of Walter Bayly Llona, CEO of Credicorp.

He studied at Markham College, a British private school in Lima, and later at Colegio San Agustín of Lima. In his youth, he was convinced by his mother to work at the daily newspaper La Prensa of Lima in order to become more responsible through a part-time job.

In 1982, he was accepted to the Pontifical Catholic University of Peru. After studying for four years, he had to leave the university, as he could not pass a mandatory subject.

== Career ==
His first television appearance was in 1983 during Peru's municipal elections, interviewing candidates and politicians. Later on, he began a career as a late show host interviewing celebrities.

Bayly's first late-night show, 1990 en America, got the attention of TV audiences and critics. The following year he hosted a copy of David Letterman's Late Show called ¿Qué hay de nuevo?.

During the 1990s Bayly hosted late-night shows in the United States at CBS Telenoticias Network Latin America and Telemundo for six years.

After President of Peru Alberto Fujimori sought asylum in Japan in 2001 following a ten-year term in order to avoid prosecution on charges of corruption, independent news media found itself in a better position. Bayly was able to host political program El Francotirador ("The Sniper"), interviewing candidates to the 2001 presidential election. In that program, he apparently offended several personalities with his political opinions, and finally had to quit. Inspired by the experience, Bayly wrote a book, taking the title from the show. Later he resumed the program.

In 2006, he supported right-wing Lourdes Flores for presidency. In 2010, Bayly announced he intended to run for president in the 2011 Peruvian general election to succeed Alan García. Later that year, he supported leftist candidate Susana Villaran in her successful campaign to become mayor of Lima. As a consequence, broadcasting company Frecuencia Latina cancelled his show.

On his U.S. program which airs on the Miami-based MegaTV channel, Bayly is well known for his views which have included sharp criticism of the Venezuelan government of Hugo Chávez and Nicolás Maduro.

=== Run for the presidency ===
Bayly returned to Peru in July 2013 for an interview hosted by Jaime de Althaus in his program of Channel N (8). In the interview, he made a statement that he will run for the presidency under the banner of the party Popular Action. In 2011, he intended to run under various parties like the Christian People's Party.

== Awards ==
- Suncoast Regional EMMY® - On Camera Talent – Commentator/Editorialist - 2008 - (Bayly) - Winner
- GLAAD Media Visibilidad - 2007
- Planeta de Novela - 2005 - (Y De Repente Un Angel) - Runner-up
- Herralde de Novela - 1997 - (La Noche Es Virgen) - Winner

== Bibliography ==
His novel No se lo Digas a Nadie (Don't Tell Anyone) inspired a screenplay for a film of the same title (1998), directed by Francisco Lombardi, and starring Santiago Magill and Christian Meier. He wrote other novels, all of them on politics, sexual freedom and friendship. Several of his books contain recurring semi-autobiographical elements (e.g. a bisexual cocaine-using Peruvian newscaster who moves to Miami). The character for "El Cojo" is supposedly based on his father who was also crippled. His characters are often heartless, and reflect moral ambivalence, which makes it difficult to identify with them. In 2018, he published Pecho Frío, a work that combines humor, autobiographical references and reflection on men's sexual identity.

=== Novels ===
- No se lo Digas a Nadie, 1994 (Don't Tell Anyone); film by Francisco Lombardi in 1998.
- Fue Ayer y No Me Acuerdo 1995 (It Was Yesterday, I Don't Remember It)
- Los últimos días de 'La Prensa', 1996 (The Last Days of La Prensa)
- La Noche es Virgen, 1997 (The Night Is Virgin); Winner of the Herralde de Novela Award
- Yo Amo a Mi Mami, 1999 (I Love My Mommy)
- Los Amigos que Perdí, 2000 (The Friends I Lost)
- Aquí no hay Poesía, 2001 (There Is No Poetry Here)
- La mujer de mi hermano 2002 (My Brother's Wife); film by Ricardo de Montreuil in 2005.
- El Huracán Lleva tu Nombre, 2004 (The Hurricane Has Your Name)
- Y de Repente, Un Ángel, 2005 (Suddenly, An Angel), finalist of Premio Planeta
- El Canalla Sentimental, 2008 (The Sentimental Jerk)
- El Cojo y el Loco, 2009 (The Crippled and the Crazy)
- Morirás Mañana: El Escritor Sale a Matar, 2010 (You Will Die Tomorrow: Writer Sets Out to Kill)
- Morirás mañana 2: El misterio de Alma Rossi, 2011 (You Will Die Tomorrow: The Mystery of Alma Rossi, Volume 2)
- Morirás mañana 3: Escupirán sobre mi tumba, 2012 (You Will Die Tomorrow: They'll Spit on my Grave, Volume 3)
- La lluvia del tiempo, 2014 (The Rain of Time)
- El niño terrible y la escritora maldita, 2016
- Pecho frío, 2018
- Los Genios, 2023

=== Short-stories ===
- Yo soy una señora, 2019

=== Poetry ===
- 2001 - Aquí no hay poesía, poemario, Anagrama

=== Chronicles ===
- 2002 - El francotirador, crónica periodística; Empresa Periodística Nacional, diario Ojo, Lima
