= Playing House (2011 film) =

- Movie poster
- Directed by: Tom Vaughan
- Written by: Tom Vaughan, Kristy Dobkin
- Produced by: Dolly Hall; Chris Uettwiller; Courtney Wulfe
- Cinematography: Sean Maxwell
- Edited by: Martin Desmond Roe
- Music by: Austin Wintory
- Production company: UV Pictures
- Distributed by: Maya Entertainment
- Release date: February 25, 2011 (NewFilmmakers LA)
- Running time: 84 minutes
- Country: United States
- Language: English

Playing House is a 2011 American direct-to-video thriller film directed by Tom Vaughan starring Shelley Calene-Black, Alex Dorman and Mari E. Ferguson in lead roles.

== Plot ==
In order to afford their dream house, newlyweds Jen and Mitch Mckenzie ask their best friend Danny to move in with them. The plan works beautifully until Danny brings home Blair, a stunning and beautiful temptress. Blair tries to seduce Mitch with her beauty and sex appeal when she is with Danny. This makes Mitch make behavioral changes towards Jen. Later, Blair electrocutes Danny in his bath tub. Then, it is revealed that Blair's earlier boyfriends had also died in some way after meeting her. After Danny's death Mitch allows Blair to stay in the house and is falling to her temptations. This widens the gap between Jen and him. Jen leaves the house and starts working as head chef in a hotel.

In a market store, Blair is confronted by Sharon who tries to blackmail her and warns her that she knows how she killed her boyfriends just for their money. On their next meeting, Blair kills Sharon and hides her body in the house. Later that night Blair, tries to seduce Mitch but he refuses her, remembering of Jen. Angered by his reaction, Blair then tries to kill him but is interrupted by the arrival of Jen back at the house. A fight ensues between the two and Blair is killed by Jen when she is run over by Jen's car. Mitch is saved and both unite when the police arrive at the scene.

== Cast ==
- Shelley Calene-Black as Sharon
- Alex Dorman as Tiffany
- Mari E. Ferguson as Widow
- Caleb George as Eric
- Mayra Leal as Blair
- Matt Lusk as Danny Hockman
- Kevin Parker as Steve
- Sarah Prikryl as Jen McKenzie
- Celeste Roberts as Dr. Nicole Hardy
- Craig Welzbacher as Mitch McKenzie
