= My Brother's Wife =

- Spanish: La mujer de mi hermano
- Directed by: Ricardo de Montreuil
- Written by: Jaime Bayly
- Produced by: Stan Jakuvowicz (Shallow Entertainment); Diego Valenzuela; Jaime Bayly; Muvie's Producciones
- Starring: Bárbara Mori; Manolo Cardona; Christian Meier
- Cinematography: Andrés Sánchez
- Music by: Atif Aslam
- Distributed by: 20th Century Fox
- Release date: October 8, 2005 (Morelia Film Festival)
- Country: Mexico
- Language: Spanish

My Brother's Wife (Spanish: La mujer de mi hermano) is a 2005 Mexican film directed by Ricardo de Montreuil, based on the novel of the same name by the Peruvian writer, journalist and TV host Jaime Bayly. It starred Bárbara Mori, Manolo Cardona, Christian Meier, and Angélica Aragón.

== Plot ==
=== Structure ===
La Mujer De Mi Hermano ( "My Brother's Wife") could be considered in a category of films that critic Alissa Quart calls 'hyperlink movies', in which multiple stories take place, each affecting the other in ways that characters are unaware of, all the while using radically different aesthetic and cinematic techniques to define the mise en scène of each storyline.

== Synopsis ==
Zoe (Bárbara Mori) is a beautiful woman who has been married to Ignacio (Christian Meier) for nearly a decade. While Zoe still loves her husband, she feels the spark has gone out of their relationship, and she's become restless and anxious. Hoping to find the excitement she craves in forbidden fruit, Zoe falls into an affair with Gonzalo (Manolo Cardona), Ignacio's rough-edged but handsome brother. During their encounters, she complains to Gonzalo that Ignacio seems uninterested in her sexually as he only has sex with her on Saturdays and rejects her advances regularly. Reciprocating her negative thoughts of Ignacio, Gonzalo accuses him of being jealous as he has gone on to work in his passion of painting. On the other hand, Ignacio is running the family business and blatantly states that Gonzalo is a good-for-nothing and a moocher as he doesn't work and simply collects his monthly stipend. Ignacio further deems Gonzalo's painting a waste of time.

Zoe confides in and seeks advice about the affair from her best friend, Boris (Bruno Bichir). One night after sex, Gonzalo comments that he suspects Ignacio of being gay. Zoe again seeks council from Boris, who states he can confirm her suspicions about Ignacio's sexuality due to his lack of sexual interest in her. Zoe and Gonzalo's passionate affair is satisfying to them both, but the adulterous couple must deal with the sharp sting of betrayal when Ignacio finds out they've been having sex. However, the story takes a big turn when it is revealed the affair has only been a revenge towards his brother for Gonzalo. He confronts Ignacio admitting he remembers being raped by him when he was younger, therefore, Gonzalo is set on destroying his life.

To further complicate the love triangle, Zoe becomes pregnant with Gonzalo's child, which he adamantly denies is his and demands Zoe abort. Zoe leaves Ignacio a Dear John letter and leaves their house. Ignacio writes a letter in return, stating that he still loves her and is willing to forgive her affair with Gonzalo. Ignacio meets Zoe at her hotel and declares that while he deeply loves her, he is sexually attracted to men. Zoe agrees to stay married to Ignacio and he agrees to raise the baby his own on the condition that Zoe allow him male lovers at his discretion. Zoe agrees to the terms and Ignacio sends Gonzalo an email in which Gonzalo is led to believe that Ignacio remained oblivious of the affair and that the baby is his.

The film closes with Ignacio and Gonzalo's mother telling Ignacio how much the baby looks like him.

== Cast ==
- Bárbara Mori as Zoe
- Manolo Cardona as Gonzalo
- Christian Meier as Ignacio
- Bruno Bichir as Boris
- Gaby Espino as Laura
- Angélica Aragón as Cristina
- Beto Cuevas as Padre Santiago
- David Leche Ruiz as Jorge

== Adaptation ==
For this film, director Ricardo de Montreuil and novelist Bayly intended to take the story in a separate and somewhat different direction than the novel. "When María Eugenia Argomedo and I began collaborating on the script, we were hoping to make something new out of the material, rather than simply reproducing the book onto film," said Montreuil on an IFC interview.

== Reviews ==
The film received mixed reviews from critics. They attacked the film's plot for being overtly dramatic, while defenders interpreted it as a truthful film, one that tries to depict the most realistic aspects of relationships. La Mujer de mi Hermano rates poorly on RottenTomatoes.com, with a 21% approval rating, the consensus being, "No better than an R-rated telenovela, with the requisite love..." It currently holds a 41% rating on Metacritic, which indicates "some medium reaction."

== Soundtrack ==
The song "Maula" and "Doorie" was sung by Atif Aslam (Pakistani Pop Singer).

== Box office ==
By the time the movie debuted in the Festival de Cine Iberoamericano de Huelva on November 26, 2005, it had already been seen in Mexico by 850,000 people. The film won second place at the festival that year, after Luis Mandoki's Voces inocentes, and was expected to reach one million total spectators and two million dollars at the box-office.

In the first week of exhibition it had a box-office total of nine million pesos (approximately 800,000 dollars). The movie opened in third place after Chicken Little and The Legend of Zorro. In the first weekend of the United States release the film grossed slightly over 1 million dollars (an uncommon feat for a Mexican film in the American market).

The film was dubbed and released in India in 2010 with the English version named as 'A Beautiful Wife' and Hindi version known as 'Spanish Beauty'. The film opened to poor reviews and both the versions performed poorly in India.Its soundtrack was given by Pakistani singer Atif Aslam.
