= Bárbara Mori =

Mexican actress (born 1978)

Bárbara Mori Ochoa
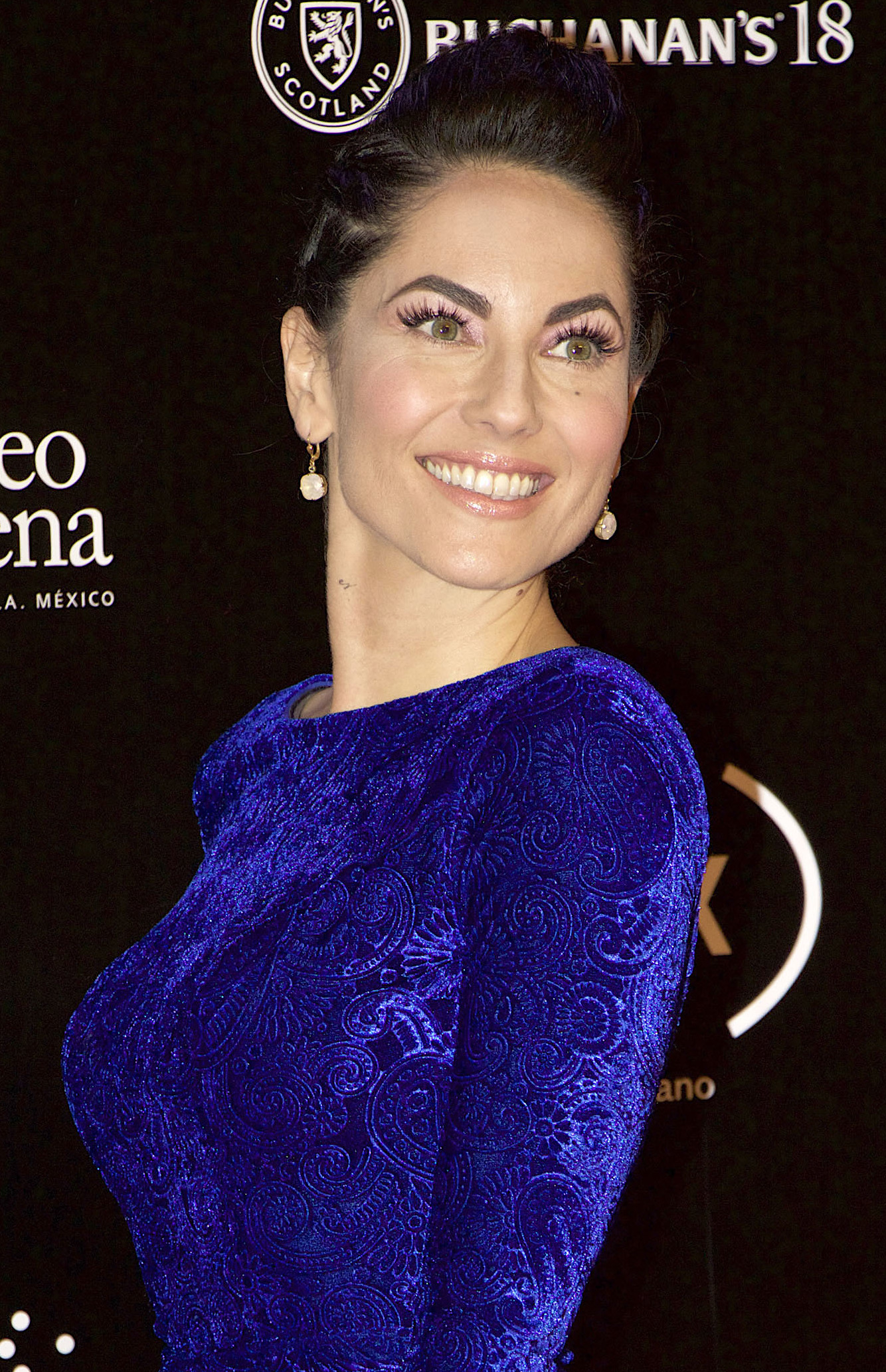
- Mori in 2018
- Born: Bárbara Mori Ochoa; 2 February 1978 (age 48); Montevideo, Uruguay
- Citizenship: Uruguay; Mexico
- Occupations: Actress; model; producer; writer
- Years active: 1997–present
- Spouse: Kenneth Ray Sigman (m. 2016; div. 2017)
- Partner: Sergio Mayer (1996–1998)
- Children: 1
- Relatives: Kenya Mori (sister)

Bárbara Mori Ochoa (Spanish pronunciation: [ˈbaɾβaɾa ˈmoɾjoˈtʃoa]) (born 2 February 1978) is a Uruguayan-born Mexican actress, model, producer, and writer. She is best known for playing the main character in the 2004 telenovela Rubí, one of the most successful telenovelas of all time. Since 2005, she has appeared as the lead in several Hollywood and Bollywood films, including My Brother's Wife (2005), Violanchelo (2008), Insignificant Things (2008), produced by Guillermo del Toro, Kites (2010), Cantinflas (2014), and Treintona, soltera y fantástica (2016).

Mori started her career in 1992 as a fashion model at the age of 14. Later she became an actress when she co-starred in 1997 on the smash TV-hit Mirada de mujer with TV Azteca; then, she starred in the telenovela Azul Tequila (1998). She has also appeared in several lists as one of the most beautiful Mexican actresses of all time.

== Life and career ==
Mori was born in Montevideo, Uruguay on February 2, 1978. Her paternal grandfather was Japanese. Her mother is of Lebanese descent. She has two siblings, actress Kenya Mori and Kintaró Mori. Her parents divorced when she was three years of age. Mori spent her early childhood between Tokyo, Japan and Uruguay and finally settled in Mexico City, Mexico at the age of fourteen.

=== Early work (1992–1997) ===
One day, while working as a waitress at the age of fourteen, fashion designer Marcos Toledo invited her to work as a model. She became independent by the age of seventeen and went to live with her cousins. At nineteen she met actor Sergio Mayer, who would later become father to their son Sergio, born in 1998. They never married.

She later studied acting in El Centro de Estudios de Formación Actoral. She made her acting debut in the Mexican telenovela Al norte del corazón. She then participated in the comedy series Tric Tac and Mirada de mujer the following year. She obtained her first TVyNovelas Award for her role in Mirada de mujer for Best New Actress.

=== Commercial success (1998–2003) ===
In 1998, Mori got her first leading role as "Azul" in the series Azul Tequila, co-starring Mauricio Ochmann. A year later, she filmed the series Me muero por tí in Miami, with Peruvian actor Christian Meier. Later, she acted in other telenovelas, including the Telemundo telenovela Amor descarado.

In 2001, she got her first film role in the romantic comedy Inspiración, the film was a box-office success in cinemas. In 2002, she played the villain as a seductive college student in the telenovela, Subete A Mi Moto.

=== Consolidation (2004–2008) ===
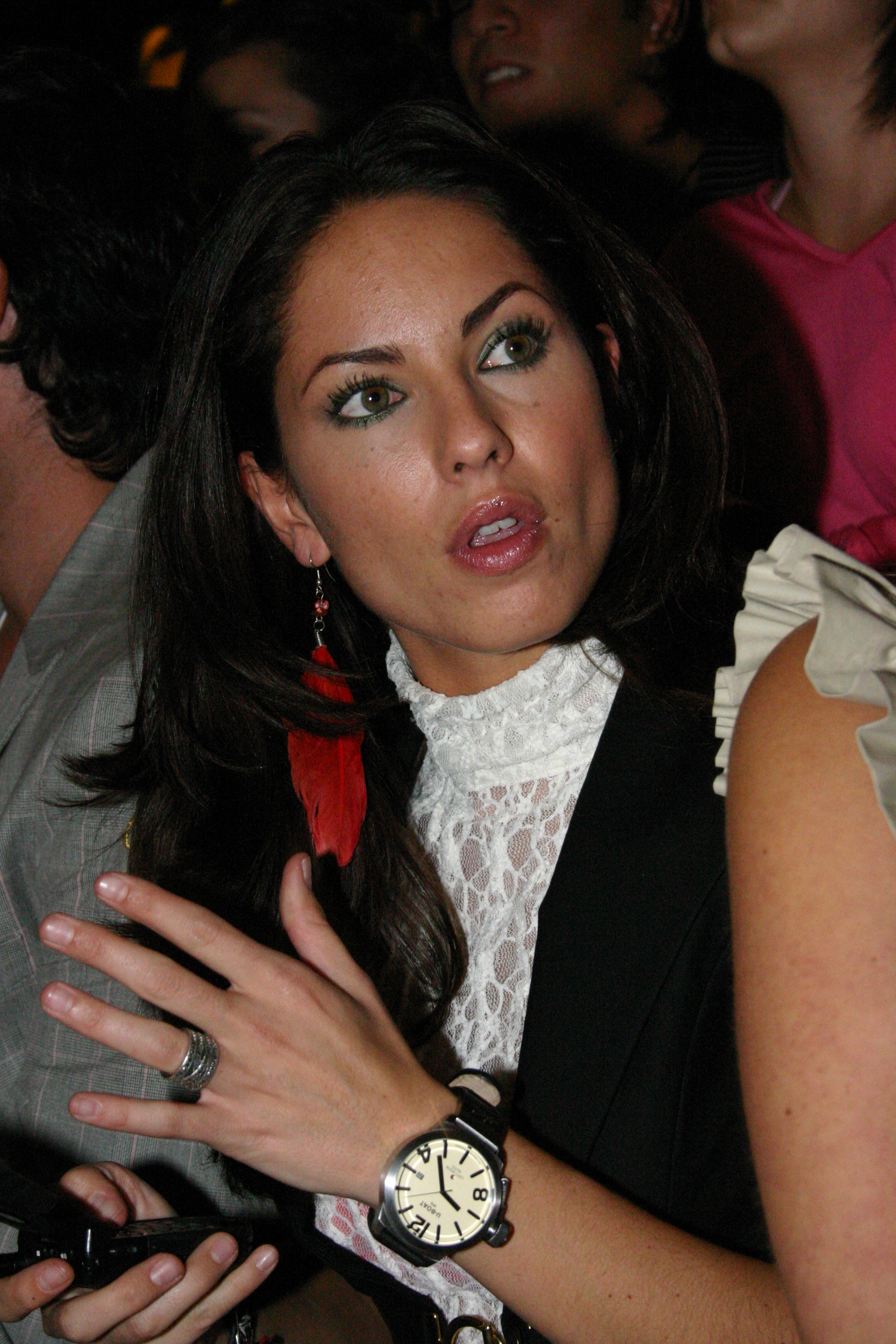
Mori in 2006.

In 2004, she signed with Televisa and starred as Rubí, a smash TV-hit and highly–rated Mexican soap opera, of the same name, which earned her another TVyNovelas Award.

In 2005, she obtained the starring role in the blockbuster film La mujer de mi hermano as Zoe, and her husband was portrayed by Christian Meier, with whom she had previously co-starred in Me muero por tí. In the same year, she lent her voice in the Spanish-language version for the movie Robots.

She also had the leading role in "Pretendiendo", a Chilean/Mexican-backed movie which was critically panned.

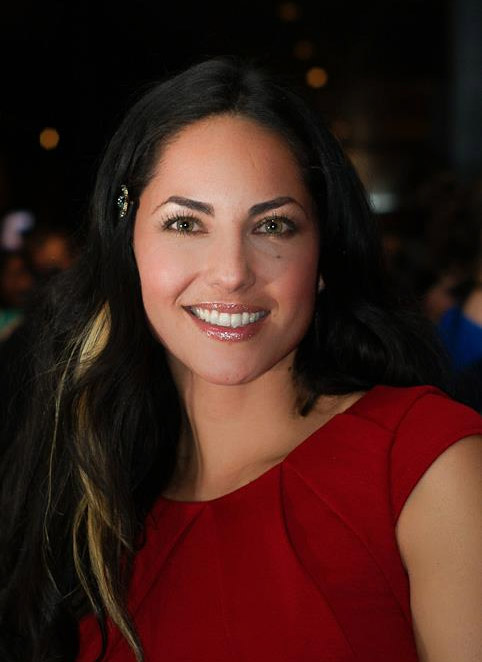
Mori in 2014.

=== International film success (2009–2011) ===
In 2009, she starred in the psychological crime thriller Amor, Dolor y Viceversa alongside Leonardo Sbaraglia. The drama is about a female architect who is involved in the murder of the fiancée of a promising surgeon, who allegedly saw in her nightmares. The crime-drama was filmed in Mexico City and is produced by Mori. The film earned mixed reviews from critics and viewers.

In 2011, she got the main role in the action-drama "Viento En Contra", alongside actors Héctor Arredondo and Fernando Luján, in which she played a successful and promising CIO, who is unjustly involved in a police chase due to a scandal of a financial fraud. The film was distributed by Warner Bros and received mixed reviews by critics. The drama was filmed on locations of Mexico City and Valle de Bravo. Mori was the producer of the film.

Indian film producer Rakesh Roshan signed her as the leading lady for his movie Kites opposite his son, Bollywood star Hrithik Roshan. It was shot in New Mexico, Las Vegas and Los Angeles. It went into production by the end of July 2008, and was released on 21 May 2010.

Mori was diagnosed with early stage cancer and is now a proud survivor. She talks about her journey in UniGlobe Entertainment's docu-drama titled 1 a Minute made by actress Namrata Singh Gujral.

== Personal life ==
In 1996, Mori began a relationship with actor Sergio Mayer, with whom she has a son, Sergio Mayer Mori, born in 1998. The couple separated shortly after. In 2016 she wed baseball player Kenneth Ray Sigman, brother of actress Stephanie Sigman. The couple divorced in 2017.

Mori was romantically linked with Indian actor Hrithik Roshan when they were filming the movie Kites.

Mori's son has a daughter born in November 2016, making her a grandmother at 38.

== Filmography ==
Telenovelas, Series, Films, Theater
Year	Title	Role	Notes
1997	Tric Trac		Special Appearance
1997	Al norte del corazón		Special Appearance
1997–98	Mirada de mujer	Mónica San Millán	Supporting Role
1998–99	Azul Tequila	Azul Vidal/Soledad	Protagonist
1999-00	Me muero por ti	Santa	Protagonist
2000	Inspiración	Alejandra	Film
2001	Amores, querer con alevosía	Carolina Morales	Protagonist
2001	Vaselina, el musical		Theatrical Performance
2002	Vaselina, al revés		Theatrical Performance
2002	Celos dije		Theatrical Performance
2002–03	Súbete A Mi Moto	Nelly Noriega/Nelly Toledo	Main Antagonist
2003–04	Mirada de mujer: El regreso	Mónica San Millán	Supporting Role
2003–04	Amor Descarado	Fernanda Lira	Protagonist
2004	Rubí	Rubí Pérez Ochoa de Ferrer/Fernanda Martínez Pérez/Rivera Pérez	Protagonist/Antagonist
2005	Pretendiendo	Helena/Amanda	Film
2005	La mujer de mi hermano	Zoe	Film
2005	Robots	Cappy (voice)	Film-Mexican version
2007	Por siempre		Film
2008	Cosas insignificantes	Paola	Film
2008	Violanchelo	Consuelo	Film
2009	Amor, dolor y viceversa	Consuelo	Film
2010	Kites	Natasha/Linda	Indian Film most dialogue in Spanish/English
2010	1 a Minute	Star	Film
2010	El coleccionista	Miranda	Theatrical Performance
2011	Viento en Contra	Luisa Braniff	Film
2014	Cantinflas	Elizabeth Taylor	Film
2014	Dos Lunas	Soledad/Luna Garcia	TV series
2018	The Mongolian Conspiracy	Martita Fong	Film
2020	All That Is Invisible	Amanda/Morris	Film
2020	La negociadora	Eugenia Velasco	TV series
2021	Tu eres mi problema	Luisa	Film
2023	Perdidos en la noche (Lost in the Night)	Carmen	TV series
2024–2026	Women in Blue (Las Azules)	María de la Torre	TV series
2024	Mistura	Norma Piet	Film
2025	Lucca's World	Bárbara Anderson	Netflix movie

== Awards and nominations ==
=== Ariel Awards ===
Year	Category	Film	Result
2020	Best Supporting Actress	El Complot Mongol	Nominated

=== Premios TVyNovelas ===
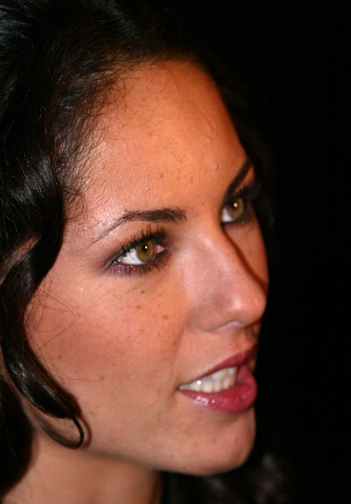
Bárbara Mori

Year	Category	Telenovela	Result
1998	Best Female Revelation	Mirada de mujer	Won
2005	Best Lead Actress	Rubí	Won

=== Premios Juventud ===
Year	Category	Nominee	Result
2005	Girl of my Dreams	Rubí	Won
2006	Girl of my Dreams	Bárbara Mori	Won
2007	She Steals the Show	La mujer de mi hermano	Won

=== Premios People en Español ===
Year	Category	Film	Result
2010	Best Actress	Kites	Won

=== Premios Canacine ===
Year	Category	Film	Result
2005	Mexican Actress of the Year	La mujer de mi hermano	Won
2009	Mexican Actress of the Year	Cosas insignificantes	Nominated
2011	Mexican Actress of the Year	Viento en contra	Won
