= TVyNovelas for Best Co-star Actor =

== Winners ==
Year	Actor	Telenovela
1987	Humberto Elizondo	Cuna de lobos
1991	Salvador Pineda	Mi pequeña Soledad
1992	Otto Sirgo	Alcanzar una estrella II
1993	Fernando Ciangherotti	María Mercedes
1995	Pedro Webber	Agujetas de color de rosa
1996	Otto Sirgo	Lazos de amor
1997	Leonardo Daniel	Cañaveral de pasiones
1998	Carlos Bonavides	Salud, dinero y amor
1999	César Évora	El Privilegio de Amar
2000	César Évora	Laberintos de pasión
2001	Pablo Montero	Abrázame muy fuerte
2002	Jorge Poza	El Manantial
2003	Rafael Inclán	Clase 406
2004	Ernesto Laguardia	Amor Real
2005	Eric del Castillo	Apuesta por un amor
2006	Ernesto Laguardia	Alborada
2007	José José	La fea más bella
2008	Alejandro Tommasi	Destilando amor
2009	Jorge Poza	Alma de Hierro
2010	Raúl Araiza	Un gancho al corazón
2011	Jesús Ochoa	Para volver a amar
