= Valentina (1993 TV series) =

- Genre: Telenovela
- Created by: Inés Rodena; Alfonso Cremata; Salvador Ugarte
- Written by: Alfonso Cremata; Salvador Ugarte; Carlos Romero; Eric Vonn; José Antonio Olvera; Kary Fajer; Sergio Sánchez
- Directed by: Luis Vélez; Sergio Jiménez
- Starring: Verónica Castro; Juan Ferrara; Blanca Guerra; Rafael Rojas; Mayra Rojas; Hugo Acosta; Diana Golden
- Opening theme: Valentina by Verónica Castro
- Country of origin: Mexico
- Original language: Spanish
- No. of episodes: 160

Production
- Executive producer: José Alberto Castro
- Cinematography: Ernesto Arreola; Luis Monroy
- Running time: 21-22 minutes
- Production company: Televisa

Original release
- Network: Canal de las Estrellas
- Release: June 21, 1993 – January 28, 1994

Related
- Viviana (1978–1979); Los años pasan (1985); Camila (1998–1999); La esposa virgen (2005)

Valentina is a Mexican telenovela produced by José Alberto Castro for Televisa in 1993. The second part of telenovela based on La Galleguita original story of Inés Rodena.

The first part of telenovela Verónica Castro and Juan Ferrara starred as protagonists, while Blanca Guerra starred as main antagonist.

The second part of telenovela Verónica Castro and Rafael Rojas starred as protagonists, while Mayra Rojas, Hugo Acosta and Diana Golden starred as antagonists.

== Cast ==
First part

- Verónica Castro as Valentina Isabel Montero
- Juan Ferrara as Fernando Alcántara
- Blanca Guerra as Deborah Andrade
- Hugo Acosta as Félix
- Guillermo García Cantú as Víctor Luján
- Raúl Meraz as Don Rogelio Montero
- Aurora Molina as Prudencia
- Celia Cruz as Lecumé
- Zaide Silvia Gutiérrez as Rafaela
- Mario Iván Martínez as Maurice Taylor
- Rafael Sánchez Navarro as Renato Saldívar
- Dobrina Cristeva as Leticia de Alcántara/Ana María Miranda
- Andrea Legarreta as Constanza "Connie" Basurto
- Mercedes Molto as Luisita Basurto
- Daniel Edid Bracamontes as Toñito
- Lily Blanco as Julia
- Alejandro Ruiz as Pablo Martínez
- Tatiana as Leonor
- Juan Carlos Bonet as Osvaldo
- Manola Saavedra as Doña Irene
- Javier Gómez as Willy
- Aracely as Estela Montero
- Gloria Izaguirre as Rosita
- Angelita Castany as Bárbara
- Pedro Altamirano as Gerardo Antúnez
- Darío T. Pie as Bobby
- Claudio Brook as Alfred Van Dutren
- Eduardo Liñán as Sargento Mijares
- Ofelia Guilmáin as Doña Federica Alcántara
- Joaquín Garrido as Enrique
- Gerardo Franco as Luciano
- Maricruz Nájera as Gloria Luque
- Josefina Echánove as Evangelina
- Dalilah Polanco as Consuelito
- Margarita Isabel as Martha Villalón
- María Moret as Dr. Diana
- Martha Mariana Castro as Marieta
- Vanessa Angers as Lourdes
- Lucero Reynoso as Carmen
- Cecilia Romo as Mother Eugenia
- José Luis González y Carrasco as Dr. Ramírez
- Helio Castillos as Miguel
- Germán Blando as Beltrán
- Sergio Jiménez as Jacinto "El Bokor"

Second part

- Verónica Castro as Valentina Paulina de los Ángeles "Angelita" Pérez Lopez
- Rafael Rojas as Julio Carmona
- Hugo Acosta as José Manuel Corrales
- Mayra Rojas as Rebeca
- Diana Golden as Daniela Valdepeñas de Corrales
- Arturo García Tenorio as Arnulfo Chaparra
- Lucila Mariscal as Amada Paniagua "La Desvielada"
- Yolanda Mérida as Amparo de Pérez
- Manuel "Flaco" Ibáñez as Rigoberto "Rigo" Pérez
- Meche Barba as Eloína
- Enrique Novi as Enrique
- David Ostrosky as Diego
- Norma Lazareno as Alicia de Valdepeñas
- Juan Peláez as Ernesto Valdepeñas
- Yolanda Ciani as Lucrecia de Carmona
- Luis Couturier as Conrado Carmona
- Alicia Montoya as Berta
- Tatiana as Leonor
- Laura Forastieri as Raquel Rivera
- Raúl Meraz as Don Rogelio Montero
- Aurora Molina as Prudencia
- Luis Javier Posada as Jorge
- Daniel Edid Bracamontes as Toñito

== Awards ==
Year	Award	Category	Nominee	Result
1994	12th TVyNovelas Awards	Best Actor	Juan Ferrara	Nominated
1994	12th TVyNovelas Awards	Best Leading Actress	Alicia Montoya	Nominated
