= Julio Mannino =

Mexican actor

- Born: Toluca, Mexico, Mexico
- Occupation: Actor
- Years active: 1994–present

Julio Mannino is a Mexican actor, born in Toluca, Mexico.

He appeared on La fea más bella in 2006 as a supporting actor.

== Career ==
=== Reality shows ===
- Mi sueño es bailar (2012) (Concursante)

=== Telenovela ===
- Corazón de oro (2026) – Chente
- Amor amargo (2024) – Carlos Torrijos
- Tu vida es mi vida (2024) – Rigoberto
- Amor dividido (2022) – Benicio Quintana
- Sueño de amor (2016) - Mario Kuri
- Que te perdone Dios (2015) – Benito
- Cuando me enamoro (2010)
- La fea más bella (2006) – Simón "Simon" Joseph Contreras
- Apuesta por un amor (2004) – Leandro Pedraza
- Niña amada mía (2003) – Pablo Guzman
- Por un beso (2000–2001) – Neto
- Amigos x siempre (2000) – Marco
- Cuento de Navidad (1999–2000)
- El niño que vino del mar (1999) – Dr. Juan Manuel Ríos
- Rencor apasionado (1998) – Efraín
- Camila (1998) – Nacho Juárez
- Sin ti (1997–1998)
- Salud, dinero y amor (1997)
- Mi querida Isabel (1996)
- Para toda la vida (1996)
- Luz Clarita(1996)
- María la del Barrio (1995)
- Acapulco, cuerpo y alma (1995)
