= Gloria Izaguirre =

Mexican actress (born 1966)

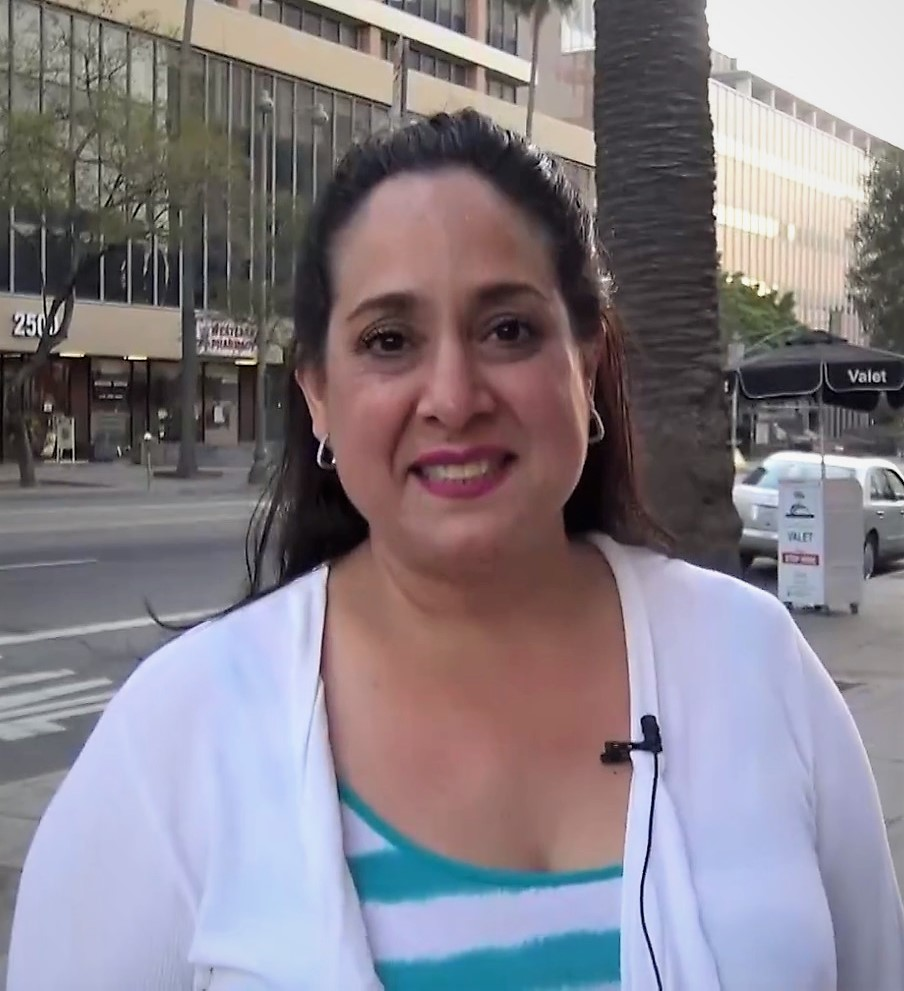
- Izaguirre interviewed by Dulce Osuna in 2017.jpg
- Born: Gloria Izaguirre; August 15, 1966 (age 59); Mexico City, Mexico
- Occupation: Actress
- Years active: 1985-present

Gloria Izaguirre (born August 15, 1966, in Mexico City, Mexico) is a Mexican actress.

== Filmography ==
=== Television ===
- Como dice el dicho (2012) .... Anabel
- Cachito de cielo (2012) .... Bernarda
- Una familia con suerte (2011) .... Yesenia
- Mujeres Asesinas (2010) .... Special participation
- Niña de mi corazón (2010) Special participation
- Atrévete a soñar (2009–2010) .... Petra
- Adictos (2009) .... Federica
- Lola, érase una vez (2007) .... Macrina Vicenta Torres
- La fea más bella (2006–2007) .... Juanita
- Bajo el mismo techo (2005) .... Teacher
- El juego de la vida (2001–2002).... Profesora Maura
- Rencor apasionado (1998) .... Cholita
- Mujer, casos de la vida real (1997/2007)
- Sentimientos ajenos (1996) .... Samy
- María la del Barrio (1995) .... Marcela
- Valentina (1993) .... Rosita
- Carrusel de las Américas (1992)
- Cadenas de amargura (1991) .... Carmelita Ríos
- Papá soltero (1989) .... Carmelita (episode "Propósitos de año nuevo")
- Dulce desafío (1988) .... Irene
- Cicatrices del alma (1986) .... Corina
- Chiquilladas (1985) .... Laura
- Cachún cachún ra ra! (1985–1987) .... Reven
