= Valentino Lanús =

Mexican actor (born 1975)

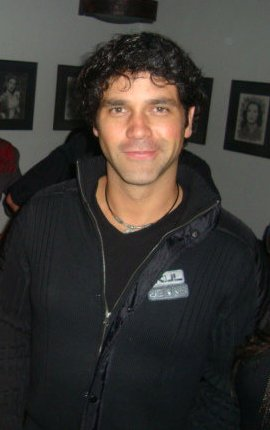
- Born: Luis Alberto López Ayala; May 3, 1975 (age 50); Mexico City, Mexico
- Occupations: Actor; model; composer
- Years active: 1997–present
- Children: 1

Luis Alberto López Ayala (born May 3, 1975, in Mexico City) is a Mexican actor.

== Biography ==
Valentino's parents are Margarita and Luis Alberto. Valentino is the second of four siblings, and is also the only male. He began his career as a model, and later enrolled in Televisa's CEA (Centro de Educación Artística). It was then when telenovela producer Carla Estrada invited him to participate in some episodes of María Isabel (1997), alongside Adela Noriega.

He later received roles in Amor Gitano (1999), La casa en la playa (2000) and Pedro Damián's Primer amor... a mil por hora (2000), where he played Imanol Jáuregui Tasso, alongside Ana Layevska, Anahí, Kuno Becker, and Sebastián Rulli. His charisma and acting style placed him among the favorites.

Soon after, Valentino participated in the telenovela El juego de la vida (2001), where embodied Juan Carlos Domínguez, a coach of girls' football. Around that time, he began dating Jacqueline Bracamontes. He also acted in Amar Otra Vez (2003) and Inocente de Ti (2004) as Julio Alberto Castillo Linares, opposite Camila Sodi, and Karla Monroig. He also appeared in Alborada (2005) as Martín Alvarado. He had the lead role in the telenovela Amar sin límites with Karyme Lozano.

He is a professional photographer and passionate traveler, who will exhibit his work of over 15 years in Madrid at the end of 2011.

He is also a producer of various TV shows and movies. His last venture is called "Artesanos", a promising film by creator Santiago Pando, a famous mystic, well known for having been the brain behind the successful political campaign that placed Vicente Fox as the first Mexican President to win over 80 years of the ruling party PRI.

== Filmography ==
=== Films ===
Year	Title	Role	Notes
2002	El lado oscuro de la noche	Unknown role	Film debut
2014	Quiero ser fiel	Alberto	

=== Television ===
Year	Title	Role	Notes
1997	María Isabel	Antonio	
1999	Amor gitano	Patricio	
2000	La casa en la playa	Miguel Ángel Villarreal Talamonti	
2000	Primer amor, a mil por hora	Imanol Jáuregui Tasso	
2001	Mujer, casos de la vida real	Unknown role	Episode: "Corazón de puerto"
2001	Primer amor, tres años después	Imanol Jáuregui Tasso	
2001–02	El juego de la vida	Juan Carlos Domínguez	
2003	Mariana de la Noche	Javier Mendieta	
2004	Amar otra vez	Daniel Suárez González	
2004	Inocente de ti	Julio Alberto Castillo Linares	
2005	Alborada	Martín Alvarado	
2006	Amar sin límites	Diego Morán	
2008	Las tontas no van al cielo	Patricio Molina Lizárraga	
2008–09	Ugly Betty	Cruz	3 episodes
2009	Hermanos y detectives	Actor de Teatro	Episode: "Muerte en escena"
2009	Plaza Sésamo	Conductor de Concursos	2 episodes
2010–11	Llena de amor	Emanuel Ruiz y de Teresa Curiel	
2012	Amor bravío	Luis del Olmo	2 episodes
2016	Maldita tentación	Fernando Bonilla	
2017	Nada personal	Alejandro Castillo	
2024	Tu vida es mi vida	José "Pepe" Castillo Ibáñez	
