= No tengo madre =

- Also known as: Ya tengo madre Ya valió madre
- Genre: Telenovela; Comedy
- Created by: Eugenio Derbez
- Written by: Carlos Aguilar
- Directed by: Eugenio Derbez; Gustavo Rodríguez; José Acosta Navas
- Starring: Eugenio Derbez; Natalia Esperón; Saby Kamalich; Susana Alexander; Norma Lazareno
- Opening theme: Yo quiero a mi mamá by Eugenio Derbez & Luis Ernesto Cano
- Country of origin: Mexico
- Original language: Spanish
- No. of episodes: 40

Production
- Executive producer: Carlos Sotomayor
- Producer: Rafael Urióstegui
- Production locations: Filming; Televisa San Ángel; Mexico City, Mexico; Locations; Mexico City, D.F., Mexico
- Cinematography: Armando Zafra; Carlos Sánchez Ross
- Running time: 21–22 minutes
- Production company: Televisa

Original release
- Network: Canal de las Estrellas
- Release: March 10 – May 2, 1997

No tengo madre (English title: I have no mother) is a Mexican comedy telenovela produced by Carlos Sotomayor for Televisa in 1997.

On March 10, 1997, Canal de las Estrellas started broadcasting No tengo madre weekdays at 8:00pm, replacing Alguna vez tendremos alas. The last episode was broadcast on May 2, 1997, with Esmeralda replacing it the following Monday.

Natalia Esperón and Eugenio Derbez starred as protagonists.

== Cast ==
- Eugenio Derbez as Eligio Augusto Maldonado/Julio Remigio Vasconcelos
- Natalia Esperón as Abril Vasconcelos
- Saby Kamalich as Tina Tomassi
- Susana Alexander as María Malpica
- Norma Lazareno as Margarita Malpica
- Raymundo Capetillo as Norberto Nerón
- Manuel Ojeda as Indalecio Madrazo/Inocencio Lemus Smasht
- María Rubio as Mamá Sarita
- Anadela as Consuelito Pulido #1
- Andrea Legarreta as Consuelito Pulido #2
- Anthony Álvarez as Angelito
- Héctor Ortega as Ezequiel
- Aurora Alonso as Doña Cata
- Daniel Martínez as Tyson
- Malena Doria as Gudelia
- José Sierra as Maritzo
- Roberto Antúnez
- René Gatica
- Luis Alberto Lacona
- Víctor Lozada
- Genoveva Moreno
- Marcela Pezet
- Georgette Terrazas
- Jeanette Terrazas
- Genaro Vásquez
- Guillermo Zarur
- Vanessa del Rocío
- Gabriel Lozada
- Flavio
