= Diana Golden (actress) =

Mexican actress and playwright

- Born: Diana Goldenberg Jiménez; August 7, 1965 (age 60); Santiago de Cali, Colombia
- Occupations: Actress, Playwright

Diana Goldenberg Jiménez (born August 7, 1965 in Santiago de Cali, Colombia), better known as Diana Golden, is a Colombian-Mexican actress and playwright of Colombian origin.

== Filmography ==
Film roles
Year	Title	Roles	Notes
1986	Mentiras		
1989	Mi mujer tiene un amante		
1989	Garra de tigre		
1990	Mujer de cabaret		
1990	El Hijo de Lamberto Quintero		
1990	Compadres a la Mexicana	Leonor	
1990	El Chivo	Isabel Montano	
1990	Carrera contra el destino		
1991	¡Mátenme porque me muero!	Maricia	
1991	Martir de Mexicali	Rita	
1992	Cándido de día, Pérez de noche	Siempreviva, La Muerte	
1992	El Gato con gatas	Teresa	
1993	Halcones de la muerte - Espias mortales	Sonia	
1993	Cuestión de honor	María	
1995	Santo Enredo	Otilia y Quebrada del Risco	
1999	El Señor de los cerros	Isadora	
2000	Suerte negra	Minerva	
2000	Noches violentas		
2001	Muertes a medianoche	Hermana Caridad	
2001	Infraterrestre	Alma Monreal	

Television roles
Year	Title	Roles	Notes
1989	El cristal empanado	Alicia	
1989	Simplemente María	Carmen	
1991	La picara soñadora	Elvira Funes	
1991	Madres egoístas	Ana Cervantes	
1992–1993	María Mercedes	Fabiola Mayerling	
1992	Carrusel de las Américas		
1993	Valentina	Daniela Valdepeñas	
1995–1996	Pobre niña rica	Beatriz Domínguez	
1996	Para toda la vida	Silvia	
1997	Sin ti	Elena	
1997–1998	Perfume de agonía		
1998–1999	Camila	Silvia Escalante	
1999–2000	Mujeres engañadas	Mónica Romero	
2001	La intrusa	Zayra Jiménez	
2002–2003	Las vías del amor	Constanza Aguirre	
2004–2005	Misión S.O.S	Doris Ramírez	
2005	Peregrina	Vicenta	
2006	La fea más bella	Sonia	
2006	Amor mío	Mariana Romero	
2006	Amar sin límites	Inés Menzur	
2007	Amor sin maquillaje	Diana	
2008–2009	Cuidado con el ángel	Mercedes	
2009–2010	Hasta que el dinero nos separe	Isabel Duarte "La Generala"	
2012	Por ella soy Eva	Assistant	
2011–2018	Como dice el dicho	Various	12 episodes
2011–2012	Dos hogares	Paola Díaz	25 episodes
2012–2013	Amores verdaderos	Gilda Leyva	75 episodes
2013	Gossip Girl: Acapulco	Paulina De Ruíz De Hinojosa	
2015	Simplemente María	Thelma	6 episodes
2017	El Bienamado	Abigail de Morones	30 episodes
2018	La bella y las bestias	Susana's Aunt	6 episodes
2019	Esta historia me suena		Episode: "Todavía"
2019	Un poquito tuyo	Rebeca's mother	2 episodes
2019	Preso No. 1	Carolina's mother	
2019–2020	Médicos	Fátima	
2020	La Doña	Victoria	
2020–2021	Falsa identidad	Greta	
2021–2022	Mi fortuna es amarte	Macorina	
