= Por un beso =

Television series

- Genre: Telenovela; Romance; Drama
- Created by: Inés Rodena
- Written by: Gabriela Ortigoza; Juan Carlos Tejeda; Carmen Sepúlveda; Juan Carlos Alcalá
- Directed by: Alfredo Gurrola; Benjamín Pineda; Gustavo Rojo
- Starring: Natalia Esperón; Víctor Noriega; Mercedes Molto; Enrique Rocha; Otto Sirgo
- Opening theme: Por Un Beso by Gloria Estefan
- Composer: Walter Murphy
- Country of origin: Mexico
- Original language: Spanish
- No. of episodes: 99

Production
- Executive producer: Angelli Nesma Medina
- Producer: María de Jesús Arellano
- Production locations: Filming; Televisa San Ángel; Mexico City, Mexico
- Cinematography: Gilberto Macín; Lino Adrián Gama Esquinca
- Camera setup: Multi-camera
- Running time: 41–44 minutes
- Production company: Televisa

Original release
- Network: Canal de las Estrellas
- Release: November 13, 2000 – March 30, 2001

Related
- La gata (1968); La gata (1970); La fiera (1983–1984); Rosa salvaje (1987–1988); Cara sucia (1992); Sueño de amor (1993); Muñeca de trapo (2000); Seus Olhos (2004); Pobre diabla (2009–2010); La Gata (2014)

Por un beso (For One Kiss) is a Mexican telenovela produced by Angelli Nesma Medina for Televisa in 2000. Based on La gata by Inés Rodena. It premiered on November 13, 2000 and ended on March 30, 2001.

Natalia Esperón and Víctor Noriega starred as protagonists, while Enrique Rocha and Mercedes Molto starred as antagonists.

== Plot ==
Blanca Garza is a beautiful singer. Her boyfriend, Mariano Díaz de León, is a famous architect, she loves him, but doesn't know that he has been lying to her all the time and he is married and has 2 sons. Julio, the childhood friend of Mariano's wife came to visit her after he inherited a lot of money from his father.

He meets Blanca and falls in love with her. Meanwhile, Blanca discovers that Mariano is married, breaks up with him and starts going out with Julio, finally falling in love with him. They happily marry and are expecting a baby. Mariano is furious and wants a revenge. He convinces Julio to invest all his money in a construction with the illegal endorsements, but Julio is not aware about it.

There was an accident at the construction and one worker dies. The police is after Julio, as the construction is in his name, he confronts Mariano's partner about this illegal construction and during the fight between them, Mariano's partner falls out of the window and dies.

Though it was an accident, but Julio was sent to prison for many years, as Mariano declares against him and also finds him the worst attorney he possibly can. After Blanca gives birth to a baby girl; Azucena, Mariano visits her in the hospital, and she realizes that it was all his fault.

The villain chokes her, saying "if you are not going to be mine, you are going to be nobody's". Blanca dies. Mariano gives money to a personal assistant of Blanca so she disappears with a newborn baby. Twenty years later Azucena turns into a beautiful girl, looking exactly like her mother.

She has no idea that her father is alive and he is in jail, she thinks he is dead. She meets Mariano's son, Daniel, and they fall in love. But soon Julio gets out of the jail, finds his daughter, Mariano finds out that Daniel is in love with the daughter of his worst enemy and the endless hatred and revenge between 2 families continues.

== Cast ==
- Natalia Esperón as Blanca Garza de Otero Robles/Azucena Otero Robles Garza
- Víctor Noriega as Daniel Díaz de León Lavalle
- Mercedes Molto as Mirna Ballesteros Mendizábal
- Enrique Rocha as Mariano Díaz de León
- Otto Sirgo as Julio Otero Robles/Gonzalo Ruiz de Cota
- Lourdes Munguía as Prudencia Aguilar
- Luz Elena González as Rita Jiménez de Ornelas
- Alejandra Meyer as Micaela 'Mica' Ornelas
- Óscar Morelli as Don Clemente Fuentes
- Luz María Jerez as Fernanda Lavalle de Díaz De León
- Felicia Mercado as Eugenia Mendizábal de Ballesteros
- Carlos Monden as Ignacio Ballesteros
- Melba Luna as Yolanda Uribe
- Héctor Cruz as Det. Romero Gil
- Gerardo Albarrán as Samuel López
- Gustavo Rojo as Lic. Carlos Guillén
- Alicia Fahr as Gloria
- Patricio Castillo as Antonio Ramírez Lugo "El Padrino"
- Raúl Magaña as David Díaz de León Lavalle
- Jorge Poza as Agustin Aguilar
- Benjamín Rivero as Luis Ponce "El Duende"
- Giovan D'Angelo as Ricardo Leyva
- Condorito Jr. as Juan Téllez
- Vilma Sotomayor as Sonia
- Margarita Magaña as Loreta Mendiola
- Julio Mannino as Ernesto "Neto" Ornelas
- Juan Carlos Bonet as Mariano Díaz de León (young)
- Ernesto Godoy as Julio Otero Robles (young)
- Dominika Paleta as Fernanda Lavalle de Díaz de León (young)
- Polly as Micaela Ornelas (young)
- Oscar Traven as Efraín Ayala
- Guillermo Aguilar as Dr. Guízar
- Jordi Landeta as Daniel Díaz de León Lavalle (child)
- Ximena Adriana as Azucena Garza (child)
- Jorge Trejo as Ernesto "Neto" Ornelas (child)
- Mauricio Aspe as Anselmo
- Arlette Pacheco as Malena
- Ramón Menéndez as Dr. Lavat
- Alejandra Barros as Thelma
- Elizabeth Aguilar as Mrs. Encino
- Ricardo Vera as Alfonso Nájera
- Alfonso Iturralde as Octavio Mendiola
- Pablo Alejandro Byrne as Agustín (child)
- Silvia Valdez as Yolanda (young)
- Rosángela Balbó as Dr. Guzmán
- Arleth Terán as Brisia
- César Castro as Lic. Urquiza
- Rafael del Villar as Félix
- Carmelita González as Elodia
- Mario Iván Martínez as Francesco
- Lourdes Reyes as Estela Hidalgo
- Sergio Sánchez as Miguel Ángel Bouvier
- Irma Torres as Leonora
- Raúl Valerio as Lic. Tinoco
- Jacqueline Voltaire as Mrs. Mier y Terán
- Guillermo Zarur as El Abuelo
- Kika Edgar as Blanca's voice
