= Margarita Magaña =

Mexican actress (born 1979)

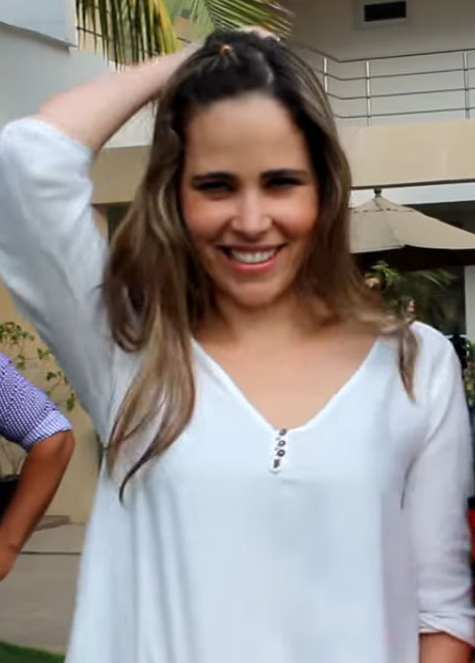
- Born: Margarita Magaña Amillategui; 25 July 1979 (age 47); Huatabampo, Sonora, Mexico
- Occupation: Actress
- Years active: 1998–present
- Spouse: Mauricio Aspe (1999–2004)
- Partner(s): Adalberto Palma (2004-present)
- Children: 3

Margarita Magaña (Spanish pronunciation: [maɾɣaˈɾita maˈɣaɲa]; born Margarita Magaña Amillategui on 25 July 1979) is a Mexican actress, best known for her roles in the Mexican television series Al diablo con los guapos, Un gancho al corazón, and Teresa.

== Career ==
Magaña was born on 25 July 1979 in Huatabampo, Sonora.

She started her career at 15 years old in the telenovela Club de Gaby. Magaña attended the Centro de Capacitación Artística de Televisa (CEA) to prepare herself as an actress. Her soap opera debut was with Thalía in María la del barrio in 1995.

Magaña made her film debut in La primera noche, sharing credits with Osvaldo Benavides and Mariana Ávila. In 1999 she plays her first role of antagonist in the soap opera Por tu Amor. In 2001 she starred in the soap opera El Juego de la Vida with Valentino Lanús, Sara Maldonado, Ana Layevska and Jackie García.

Later in 2002 she appeared in the soap opera Las vías del amor as Alicia Betanzos. In 2004 she participated in the soap opera Amar otra vez where she played a villain named Brenda next to Irán Castillo. In 2006 she played Bertha Balmori in the soap opera La Verdad Oculta.

== Personal life ==
Magaña was married to Mauricio Aspe from 1999 to 2004, and the couple had a daughter named Shakti. She then married Adalberto Palma; they had a daughter named Constanza and a son named Mateo.

== Filmography ==
=== Television ===
Year	Title	Role	Notes
1995	Bajo un mismo rostro		Guest role
1995–96	María la del Barrio	Betty	Guest role
1997	Los hijos de nadie		Guest role
1997–98	Mi pequeña traviesa	Mariana	Supporting role
1998–99	Camila	Laura Escobar	Supporting role
1999	Por tu amor	Brisa Montalvo de Zambrano	Main role
2000	La casa en la playa	Sofía Visconti	Supporting role
2000-01	Por un beso	Loreta Mendiola	Supporting role
2001-02	El juego de la vida	Fernanda "Fer" Pacheco	Lead role
2002-03	Las vías del amor	Alicia Betanzos Martínez	Main cast
2004	Amar otra vez	Brenda Montero Bustamante	Main cast
2006	La verdad oculta	Bertha Balmori Genovés	Main cast
2007-08	Al diablo con los guapos	Karla Rodríguez	Main cast
2008-09	Un gancho al corazón	Estrella "Estrellita" Falcón	Main role
2010	Mujeres Asesinas 3	Vera	Episode: "Luz, arrolladora"
2010-11	Cuando me enamoro	Young Josefina "Fina" Álvarez de Monterrubio	Guest role
2010-11	Teresa	Aída Cáceres Azuela	Main cast
2013–2014	Lo que la vida me robó	Esmeralda Ramos de Solares	Supporting role
2017–2018	Me declaro culpable	Julieta Ruvalcaba	Supporting role
2018	Por amar sin ley	Lorenza	Guest role
2020	Decisiones: Unos ganan, otros pierden	Marisela	Episode: "Encerrados"
2020	Vencer el miedo	Magdalena "Magda"	Guest role
2024	Tu vida es mi vida	Zayda Álvarez Lujan	Recurring role
2026	Hermanas, un amor compartido	Dolores Cancino	

=== Theatre ===
Year	Title	Role	Notes
1998	La Primera Noche	Rosita	

== Awards and nominations ==
=== Premios TVyNovelas ===
Year	Category	Telenovela	Result
2007	Best Female Antagonist	La Verdad Oculta	Nominated
2011	Best Female Antagonist	Teresa	Nominated
