= Amar otra vez =

Television series

- Directed by: Gastón Tuset; Claudia Elisa Aguilar
- Starring: Irán Castillo; Valentino Lanús
- Opening theme: Hoy by Gloria Estefan; No es amor by Enrique Iglesias; Tu fotografía by Gloria Estefan
- Country of origin: Mexico
- Original language: Spanish
- No. of episodes: 110

Production
- Producer: Lucero Suárez

Original release
- Network: Canal de las Estrellas
- Release: May 31 – November 5, 2004

Amar otra vez (Loving again) is a Mexican telenovela produced by Lucero Suárez for Televisa in 2004. Starring Irán Castillo and Valentino Lanús with Rafael Amaya, Margarita Magaña, Roberto Ballesteros and Vanessa Guzman, in addition to its cast in Mexico's Sweetheart Angélica María as a suffering mother.

== Cast ==
- Irán Castillo as Rocío Huertas Guzmán
- Valentino Lanús as Daniel Suárez González
- Rafael Amaya as Fernando Castañeda Eslava (villain)
- Margarita Magaña as Brenda Montero Bustamante (villain)
- Vanessa Guzmán as Verónica Santillán Vidal (villain)
- Guillermo García Cantú as Guillermo Montero
- Angélica María as Balbina Eslava
- Nuria Bages as Esperanza Suárez González
- Lourdes Munguia as Estela Bustamante de Montero
- Roberto Ballesteros as Julio Morales Ponce (villain)†
- Julio Camejo as Mateo Santillán Vidal
- Marcia Coutiño as Zoila Medina Castillo
- Maribel Palmer as Fabiola Pineda Montoya
- Eduardo Rivera as Ismael Pardo Iglesias (villain)
- Chela Castro as Antuca Ropolo viuda de Moya†
- Marisol Mijares as Janet Chamorro Beltrán
- Gabriela Cano as Molly Chamorro Beltrán
- Mario Casillas as Manuel Chamorro Gutiérrez
- Isabel Martínez "La Tarabilla" as Juanita
- Zully Keith as Carmela Navarro de Murguía
- Anastasia as Adriana Candamo Rivadeneyra
- Ana Martín as Yolanda Beltrán
- Maribel Fernández as Lucy Vidal
- Rebeca Mankita as Peggy
- Arsenio Campos as Javier
- Juan Imperio as Oscar Murguía
- Carmelita González as Lidia
- Carlos Espejel as Edilberto
- Carmen Becerra as Sandra Murguía Navarro
- Rodrigo Mejía as Gustavo Medina Castillo
- Jaime Lozano as Carrillo
- Justo Martínez as Padre Danilo
- Javier Ernez as Félix
- Roberto Miquel as Diego Gamba
- Maripaz García as Irma
- Marco Méndez as Gonzalo
- Carlos de la Mota as Sergio Santillán Millán
- Lucy Tovar as Blanca
- Ricardo Vera as Juez
- Arturo Barba as Santiago
- Iliana de la Garza as Hortensia
- Polly as Josefina
- Juan Carlos Serrán as Bonifacio
- Gerardo Gallardo as Wilfredo
- Alberto Estrella as Alberto
- Ricardo Silva as Alfonso
- Patricia Martínez as Capitana Martha Quintanilla
- Catalina López as Milagros
- Fidel Zerda as Pepe
- Martín Rojas as Toño
- Adriana Barraza as Camelia
- Carmelita González as Lidia
- Claudia Elisa Aguilar as Ofelia
- Alejandra Jurado as Rebeca
- Angeles Balvanera as Sonia
- Adriana Acosta
- Jacqueline Voltaire
- Miguel Garza
- Ricardo de Pascual Jr.
- Rebeca Manríquez
- Lina Durán
- Adalberto Parra as Carlos
- Salim Rubiales as Eduardo
- Javier Ruan as Simón Quintanilla
- Andrés Puentes as Bruno
- Thelma Dorantes as Lourdes
- Luis Reynoso as Tte. Larios
- Roberto Freyria as Wally
- Aleki Gómez Pezuela as Daniel Suárez Santillán
- Arturo Paulet as Coronel
- Tania Vázquez as Modelo
- Carlos Samperio
- Gustavo Negrete
- Marco Uriel
- Nelly Horsman
- Carmen Rodríguez
- Abril Campillo
- Jorge Ortín
- Miguel Serros
- Ernesto Bretón

== Music ==
- Song: Tu fotografía
- Writers: Gloria Estefan and G. Marco
- Singer: Gloria Estefan

Mexican Edition:

- Song: No es amor
- Singer: Enrique Iglesias
