= Rencor apasionado =

Television series

- Genre: Telenovela
- Created by: Hilda Morales de Allouis
- Written by: Marcia del Río; Lucero Suárez; Salvador Fernández; Pedro Pablo Quintanilla
- Directed by: Rafael Perrín; Lucero Suárez; Gastón Tuset
- Starring: Natalia Esperón; Eduardo Santamarina; Aracely Arámbula; Víctor Noriega; Blanca Sánchez
- Opening theme: Rencor apasionado by Jan
- Country of origin: Mexico
- Original language: Spanish
- No. of episodes: 60

Production
- Executive producer: Lucero Suárez
- Producer: Hugo Salinas
- Production locations: Filming; Televisa San Ángel; Mexico City, Mexico; Locations; Mexico City, D.F., Mexico; Querétaro, Mexico; Zitácuaro, Mexico
- Cinematography: Óscar Morales
- Camera setup: Multi-camera
- Running time: 41-44 minutes
- Production company: Televisa

Original release
- Network: Canal de las Estrellas
- Release: April 20 – July 10, 1998

Rencor apasionado (English: Burning Resentment) is a Mexican telenovela produced by Lucero Suárez for Televisa in 1998. It aired on Canal de las Estrellas from April 20 to July 10, 1998. In the United States, it aired on Univision from January 11 to April 2, 1999.

The telenovela stars Natalia Esperón, Eduardo Santamarina, Aracely Arámbula, Magda Karina and Roberto Ballesteros.

== Cast ==
- Natalia Esperón as Karina Rangél/Leonora Lujan
- Eduardo Santamarina as Mauricio Gallardo del Campo
- Aracely Arámbula as Mayté Monteverde
- Víctor Noriega as Gilberto Monteverde
- Blanca Sánchez as Elena del Campo Vda. de Gallardo
- Luis Gimeno as Cristino Reyes
- Oscar Morelli as Ernesto Monteverde
- Magda Karina as Mariana Rangel Sotomayor
- Kuno Becker as Pablo Gallardo del Campo
- Juan Carlos Serrán as Ricardo del Campo
- Gastón Tuset as Lic. Marcelo Bernal
- Patricia Martínez as Flor Jiménez
- Silvia Caos as Esther Monteverde
- Gustavo Negrete as Dr. Martínez
- Gloria Izaguirre as Cholita
- Alejandro Ávila as Alejandro Mena
- Evelyn Murillo as Rebeca
- Silvio Fornaro as Gastón Ginetti
- Eugenio Lobo as Hilario
- Rosita Quintana as Angelita
- Rudy Casanova as Jerónimo
- Juan Carlos Colombo as Dr. Otto Heifel
- Juan Imperio as Vicente
- Silvia Lomelí as Laura
- Julio Mannino as Efraín
- Mercedes Molto as Martha Valdivia
- Julio Beckles as Juancho
- Luis Gerardo Núñez as Gabino Sánchez
- María Prado as Malvis del Río
- Paola Otero as Katy
- Rosita Pelayo as Adriana
- Jorge Poza as Antonio "Tony" Mendiola
- Raúl Ramírez as William "Bill" Harrison
- Marco Uriel as Lic. Arcadio Mendiola
- Julio Vega as Sebastián
- Roberto Ballesteros as Carmelo Camacho
- Ricardo de Pascual Jr. as Luis
- Juan Ángel Esparza as Julio Rangel Rivera
- Dolores Salomón "Bodokito" as Amparo
- Fernando Torres Lapham as Doctor in Nipau
- Lupe Vázquez as Angustias
- Gabriela Salomón as Rosa
- Oyuki Manjarrez as Nachita
- Anna Sobero as Tiara
- Eduardo Borja as Agustín
- Pompín Iglesias as Rodobaldo Ilizariturri Menchaca
- Luisa Huertas as Felicitas Ilizariturri Menchaca
