= Honor y orgullo =

- Genre: Telenovela
- Country of origin: Mexico
- Original language: Spanish

Original release
- Network: Telesistema Mexicano

Honor y orgullo, is a 1969 Mexican telenovela produced by Televisa and originally transmitted by Telesistema Mexicano.

== Cast ==
- Carlos East
- Aurora Alvarado
- Otto Sirgo
- Pedro Armendáriz Jr.
