= Gabriela Cano =

Mexican actress, film producer and director

Gabriela Ofelia Cano Gamboa
- Born: April 6, 1977 (age 47); Mexicali, Baja California, Mexico
- Occupation(s): Actress, producer
- Parent(s): T.V. Producer José Octavio Cano and actress Ofelia Cano
- Relatives: Mónica and José Octavio II (siblings)

Gabriela Ofelia Cano Gamboa (born April 6, 1977) professionally known as Gabriela Cano and as Gaby Cano, is a Mexican actress, film producer and director, and theatre producer and director.

== Television credits ==
- Simplemente Renata - Ingrid de la Macorra
- Amar otra vez - Molly Chamorro Beltrán
- Clase 406 - Aurora
- Mujer, casos de la vida real
- El juego de la vida - Araceli Fuentes
- Epilogo: Primer amor... tres años después Melissa
- Primer amor... a mil por hora - Melissa Molina
- La pobre Señorita Limantour - Regina Limantour (girl)
- Garabatos - Susy (Pilot show)

== Discography ==
- Wanda Band, "Cartas de una Chica Misteriosa" (Fonovisa Record Company)
- Éden Band, "Por tí"
