= Lourdes Munguía =

Mexican actress (born 1950)

- Born: Lourdes María de Guadalupe Munguía Gasque; December 12, 1960 (age 64); Mexico City, D.F., Mexico
- Occupation: Actress
- Years active: 1979–present
- Partner(s): Cuauhtémoc Blanco (2013–2015)

Lourdes Munguía (born Lourdes María Guadalupe Munguía Gasque; December 12, 1960 in Mexico City, D.F., Mexico) is a Mexican actress.

== Filmography ==
Telenovelas, Series, Films
Year	Title	Role	Notes
1979	Amor a la mexicana		Film
1981	La Muerte del palomo		Film
1982–83	Gabriel y Gabriela	Dora	Supporting Role
1985	Chespirito	Actress	Episode: "La Chimoltrufia Superestrella"
1986	Muchachita	Rosa Sánchez	Protagonist
1988	Los Camaroneros		Film
1988	Papá soltero	Paulina	Episode: "La manzana de la discordia"
1990	Destino	Cecilia Jiménez	Protagonist
1990	¿Cómo fui a enamorarme de ti?		Film
1994–95	Agujetas de color de rosa	Fabiola	Special Appearance
1995	Me tengo que casar		Film
1995	Papá soltero	Claudia	Film
1996–97	Tú y yo	Alejandra	Supporting Role
1997	Pueblo chico, infierno grande	Altagracia "La Cheraneca"	Special Appearance
1998–99	El Privilegio de Amar	Ofelia Beltrán	Antagonist
1999	Por tu amor	Alma Ledesma de Higueras/Mayra Rivas	Supporting Role
1999	Inesperado amor		Film
1999-00	DKDA: Sueños de Juventud	Luisa Insuaín	Supporting Role
2000–01	Rayito de luz	Rayito's mother	TV Mini-series
2000–01	Por un beso	Prudencia Aguilar	Supporting Role
2001	Aventuras en el tiempo	Rosalba del Campo	Special Appearance
2002–03	Así son ellas	Irene Molet de Villaseñor/Azucena Casablanca	Protagonist
2003–04	Amar otra vez	Estela Bustamante de Montero	Supporting Role
2005	La esposa virgen	Aída Palacios	Supporting Role
2005	La Madrastra	Lourdes	Special Appearance
2006	Heridas de amor	Daira Lemans	Supporting Role
2006–07	Amar sin límites	Emilia	Supporting Role
2008	Fuego en la sangre	Maria Libia Reyes de Robles	Special Appearance
2008	La rosa de Guadalupe	Irasema	1 Episode
2008–09	Mañana es para siempre	Dolores "Dolly" de Astorga #1	Supporting Role
2009–10	Verano de amor	Violeta Palma	Supporting Role
2009–10	Atrévete a soñar	Lucía	Special Appearance
2009–10	Hasta Que el Dinero Nos Separe	Laura Fernandez del Villar "La Burguesa"	Special Appearance
2010–11	Cuando Me Enamoro	Constanza Monterrubio de Sánchez	Supporting Role
2010–11	Triunfo del amor	Marcela de Ríos	Special Appearance
2011	Como dice el dicho	Gaby	Special Appearance
2012	Por Ella Soy Eva	Juan Carlos's lover	Special Appearance
2012	Abismo de pasión	Carolina "Carito" Meraz	Supporting Role
2013	Mentir para Vivir	Lila Martín de Sánchez	Antagonist
2014–15	Muchacha italiana viene a casarse	Joaquina Sánchez Árias	Supporting Role
2015	Que te perdone Dios	Isabel Muñoz	Special Appearance
2018–19	Por amar sin ley	Lourdes	Supporting Role
2021	Vencer el pasado	Caridad "Yoali" Martínez	Special Appearance
2022–23	Cabo		
