= Garibaldi (group) =

Mexican pop group

Garibaldi is a Mexican pop group, that wore a free version of the traditional charro costume while singing modern versions of traditional songs. Their dress and style of music caused controversy in their time. The name Garibaldi comes from Plaza Garibaldi in Mexico City where mariachi bands can be found. The group remained active from 1988 through 1994, although it continues to be active as of 2023 with new members. The group was created by Mexican TV producer Luis de Llano Macedo during the celebration of the 175 years of Mexican Independence in the musical festival held in Acapulco, Guerrero.

== Reunion ==
In 1999 the group reunited to record Reunion 10, in celebration of 10 years from their commencement. The group was dissolved months later after a mild reception from the public.

In 2010 the group reunited for a second time to record Garibaldi Bicentenario, in celebration of the 200 years of Mexican Independence. However, two of the original members abandoned the reunion project. At first, Víctor Noriega did not appear in the production release citing work exhaustion due to the completion of a recent soap opera. Patricia Manterola followed citing other work commitments as the cause of her departure. The remaining six members did perform a tour throughout Mexico and USA including the celebration of the Independence Day at the Mandalay Bay Hotel in Las Vegas on September 17, 2010.

== Members ==
Original members, and their occupations:

- Sergio Mayer: Producer, Entrepreneur, Actor
- Víctor Noriega: Actor, singer
- Charly López: Actor, restaurant owner, Model, Producer.
- Xavier Ortiz (+): Actor, Model, TV Host (died 2020)
- Patricia Manterola: Singer, Actress
- Pilar Montenegro: Singer, actress
- Luisa Fernanda: TV & radio host, actress
- Katia Llanos: Entrepreneur, TV host

Replacement members, and their current occupations are:

- Rafael Amaya: Actor, model, singer
- Íngrid Coronado: TV host, actress
- Rebeca Tamez: Beauty queen Nuestra Belleza México
- Paola Toyos: Actress
- Alyn Chenillo: Actress
- Ana Saldivar: Actress
- Agustín Arana: Actor
- Stefano Bosco: Model

== Films ==
- 1993: Dónde quedó la bolita

== Discography ==
- 2010: Bicentenario
- 1999: Reunion 10
- 1998: Garibaldi XXI
- 1995: Miami Swing
- 1994: Caribe
- 1993: Gritos De Guerra, Gritos De Amor
- 1993: Dónde Quedó La Bolita (Original Soundtrack)
- 1991: Nochebuena
- 1991: Los Hijos De Buda
- 1990: Que Te La Pongo
- 1988: Garibaldi
