= El diario de Daniela =

- Genre: Telenovela
- Created by: Palmira Olguín
- Screenplay by: Fernanda Villeli
- Story by: Marcela Fuentes-Berain
- Directed by: Isabel Basurto; Eduardo Said; Joaquín Bissner; Alfredo González; Gilberto Macin; Martín Pérez
- Starring: Yolanda Ventura; Marcelo Buquet; Daniela Luján; Gaspar Henaine; Mónika Sánchez
- Music by: Carlos Páramo; Pablo Aguirre
- Opening theme: "El diario de Daniela" by Daniela Luján and Martín Ricca
- Country of origin: Mexico
- Original language: Spanish
- No. of seasons: 1
- No. of episodes: 100

Production
- Executive producer: Rosy Ocampo
- Producer: Eduardo Meza
- Production locations: Mexico City, Mexico
- Cinematography: Manuel Barajas; Jesús Nájera
- Editors: Georgina Flores; Alfredo Sánchez
- Camera setup: Multi-camera
- Production company: Televisa

Original release
- Network: Canal de las Estrellas
- Release: November 30, 1998 – April 16, 1999

El diario de Daniela (English: The Diary of Daniela or Daniela's Diary) is a Mexican telenovela produced by Rosy Ocampo for Televisa in 1998.

On Monday, November 30, 1998, Canal de las Estrellas started broadcasting El diario de Daniela weekdays at 4:00pm, replacing Gotita de amor. The last episode was broadcast on Friday, April 16, 1999, live at Estadio Azteca with El niño que vino del mar replacing it on Monday April 19, 1999.

Yolanda Ventura and Marcelo Buquet (then changed with Gerardo Murguía) starred as adult protagonists, Daniela Luján and Martín Ricca starred as child protagonists, while Mónika Sánchez, Odiseo Bichir, Roberto Ballesteros, David Ostrosky, Mariana Huerdo, Carlos Peniche, Melina Escobedo and Fernando Rodríguez starred as main antagonists. Leticia Calderón starred as special participation. The soundtrack album sold 300,000 units in Mexico as of 2002.

== Plot ==
Daniela Monroy is a girl who lives with her family made up of her parents Enrique and Leonor, her older sister Adela and her little brother Juancho. She has a journal where she writes all her wishes, secrets, illusions and dreams. Enrique is the owner of a theater, the main stage of the telenovela, where Daniela and her inseparable group of friends always get together. But the happiness of Daniela and her family is abruptly broken when her mother, the loving Leonor, drowns in a scuba diving accident. From here on, misfortune will haunt the Monroy family, as Elena, a beautiful but unscrupulous woman, is sickly obsessed with obtaining Enrique's love and will seek by all means to be his legitimate wife.

At the same time, the story of another boy unfolds, Martín Linares, a boy with a broken family. His parents, Pepe and Rita, divorced and although Pepe, Enrique's best friend, adores his son, he cannot visit him as he wanted since Rita won custody of his son and remarried Gustavo, a violent man who abuses Martin.

Despite all the misfortunes, Daniela and Martín share a childhood love and fight to return to their earlier happiness.

== Cast ==
- Yolanda Ventura as Natalia Navarro
- Marcelo Buquet as Enrique Monroy #1 (eps. 1-70)
- Gerardo Murguía as Enrique Monroy #2 (eps. 71–100)
- Daniela Luján as Daniela Monroy
- Martín Ricca as Martín Linares Moreno
- Gaspar Henaine "Capulina" as Don Capu
- Mónika Sánchez as Elena Ruiz
- Odiseo Bichir as Joel Castillo
- Anahí as Adela Monroy
- Juan Pablo Gamboa as Pepe Linares
- Marcela Páez as Rita Moreno de Corona
- Amparo Arozamena as Amparito
- María Prado as Doña Emma
- Héctor Hernández as Jaime
- Fernando Torre Laphan as Ángel Corona
- Claudia Vega as Mariana Gómez
- María Alicia Delgado as Eva García
- Eduardo Liñán as Detective Quintana
- Eduardo López Rojas as Pedro Farías
- Manuel Saval as Andrés Zamora
- Roberto Ballesteros as Arturo Barto
- David Ostrosky as Gustavo Corona
- Jorge Poza as Carlos
- Mariana Huerdo as Tania
- Mónica Riestra as Crista de Linares
- Carlos Peniche as Ricky Rey
- Paulina de Labra as Flor
- Ehécatl Chávez as Jairo
- Yulyenette Anaya as Lidi Parker
- Isaac Castro as Yuls
- Melina Escobedo as Malú
- Pablo Poumian as Toby
- Óscar Larios as Chuy
- Christopher von Uckermann as Christopher Robin
- Fernando Rodríguez as Sergio
- Odemaris Ruiz as Gina
- Rodrigo Soberon as Juancho Monroy
- Fátima Torre as Fátima
- Yamil Yitani Maccise as Yamil
- Enrique Borja Baena

Special participation

- Leticia Calderón as Leonor de Monroy
