= Tu vida es mi vida (TV series) =

- Genre: Telenovela
- Based on: Amar a morir by: Carlos Espinoza; Alexis Mardones; Guillermo García
- Developed by: Juan Carlos Alcalá
- Written by: Rosa Salazar Arenas; Alejandra Díaz
- Directed by: Sergio Cataño; Armando Quiñones
- Starring: Susana González; Valentino Lanús; Juan Soler
- Theme music composer: Orlando Di Pietro
- Opening theme: "Tu vida es mi vida" by Lucero
- Composer: Ignacio Pérez
- Country of origin: Mexico
- Original language: Spanish
- No. of seasons: 1
- No. of episodes: 90

Production
- Executive producer: Angelli Nesma Medina
- Producer: José Ignacio Alarcón
- Editor: Octavio López
- Camera setup: Multi-camera
- Production company: TelevisaUnivision

Original release
- Network: Las Estrellas; Univision
- Release: 15 January – 17 May 2024

Tu vida es mi vida (English: Your Life is my Life) is a Mexican telenovela produced by Angelli Nesma Medina for TelevisaUnivision. It is based on the 2019 Chilean telenovela Amar a morir. The series stars Susana González and Valentino Lanús. It premiered on Las Estrellas and Univision on 15 January 2024. It ended on Las Estrellas on 17 May 2024.

== Plot ==
Paula learns that she has a terminal illness and has 6 to 8 months to live. She rethinks her existence and leaves her job as a businesswoman and buys a food truck to spend her time with her three children. They are joined by Paula's father Lorenzo, who is unaware of his daughter's illness and insists that they start their journey in the town where they have had a country house for years. There they will meet Pepe, a good man with noble feelings who is about to divorce Malena, a selfish woman who cheated on him with Rafael, Pepe's own brother. Although their relationship starts off on a less than cordial note, Paula and Pepe can't help but feel attracted to each other and with a to-do list that they each have, they find that they are right for each other.

== Cast ==
=== Main ===
- Susana González as Paula Lugo Navarro
- Valentino Lanús as José "Pepe" Castillo Ibáñez
- Juan Soler as Lorenzo Lugo Otero
- Lisardo as Rolando Molina Rubio
- Pedro Moreno as Rafael "Rafa" Castillo Ibáñez
- Elsa Ortíz as Malena García Robles
- Verónica Merchant as Isabela Ibáñez Cuevas
- Roberto Mateos as Alejandro "Alex" Castillo Núñez
- Sofia Rivera Torres as Natalia Ferrer Martínez
- Pablo Valentín as Marcos Balam
- Surya Macgrégor as Rosa Martínez Torres
- Margarita Magaña as Zaida Álvarez Lujan
- Eduardo Liñán as Dr. Patricio Jasso
- Daniela Montero as Lucha
- Romina Poza as Lucía Castillo García
- Sergio Madrigal as Emiliano Serrano Lugo
- Elena Pérez as Renata Longoria Portillo
- Karla Gaytán as Andrea Castillo Álvarez
- Pedro Baldo as Arturo
- Bruno Piza as Diego Serrano Lugo
- Germán Martínez as Federico
- Camila Méndez as Susana "Susy" Serrano Lugo
- Rodrigo Ríos as Mateo "Teo" Castillo García
- Laura Flores as Gracia Martínez Torres

=== Guest stars ===
- Julio Mannino as Rigoberto
- Lorena Álvarez as Teresa
- Marcos Montero as Germán Serrano Riquelme

== Production ==
=== Development ===
In February 2023, it was announced that Angelli Nesma Medina had begun pre-production on her upcoming telenovela. Filming began on 26 October 2023 and concluded on 11 April 2024.

=== Casting ===
On 23 August 2023, Susana González was announced in the lead role. In September 2023, Juan Soler, Elsa Ortiz and Sofia Rivera Torres joined the cast. On 4 October 2023, Valentino Lanús was announced to star opposite of González.

== Ratings ==
=== Mexico ratings ===
Viewership and ratings per season of Tu vida es mi vida
| Season | Timeslot (CT) | Episodes | First aired | | Last aired | | Avg. viewers (millions) |
| Season | Timeslot (CT) | Episodes | Date | Viewers (millions) | Date | Viewers (millions) | Avg. viewers (millions) |
|---|---|---|---|---|---|---|---|
| 1 | Mon–Fri 6:30 p.m. | 77 | 15 January 2024 | 2.6 | 17 May 2024 | 2.5 | 2.12 |

=== U.S. ratings ===
Viewership and ratings per season of Tu vida es mi vida
| Season | Timeslot (ET) | Episodes | First aired | | Last aired | | Avg. viewers (millions) |
| Season | Timeslot (ET) | Episodes | Date | Viewers (millions) | Date | Viewers (millions) | Avg. viewers (millions) |
|---|---|---|---|---|---|---|---|
| 1 | Mon–Fri 8:00 p.m. | 90 | 15 January 2024 | 1.32 | 27 May 2024 | 1.19 | 1.11 |

== Episodes ==
| No. | Title | Mexico air date | U.S. air date | Mexico viewers (millions) | U.S. viewers (millions) |
|---|---|---|---|---|---|
| 1 | "Te queda un año de vida, Paula" | 15 January 2024 (Note: Premiered early online through Las Estrellas website on 12 January 2024.) | 15 January 2024 | 2.6 | 1.32 |
Dr. Jasso detects an inoperable brain tumor in Paula and warns her how little time she has left to live. Pepe receives an anonymous message warning him that his wife is unfaithful. Malena asks Rafael not to reveal that he is her lover in order to save her marriage. Paula and her family interrupt the Castillo family's party, which does not amuse Pepe. Paula tries to stop a confrontation between Pepe and Rolando by dousing them with a hose, which causes more chaos.
| 2 | "No te mueras, Paula" | 16 January 2024 | 16 January 2024 | 2.4 | 1.34 |
Paula tries to make up for lost time with her children, but they complain to her for putting them aside to focus on her professional life. Natalia proposes to Rolando that they join forces to strip Paula of her fortune. Paula confesses her illness to Lorenzo but he begs her to seek alternative treatments to cure her tumor. Paula realizes that her truck is about to run over Teo and rushes to save him regardless of her own well-being.
| 3 | "Te haré la vida de cuadritos, Paula" | 17 January 2024 | 17 January 2024 | 2.5 | 1.33 |
Paula wakes up for a moment after fainting and thinks she is with her late husband, Germán. Pepe pretends to be Paula's worried husband to get her treated quickly at the hospital. Renata is annoyed with Emiliano when she sees him giving Lucía a lot of attention. Natalia discovers that Paula might be sick. Paula warns Pepe that she will park her food truck in front of his restaurant and he gets upset at her for trying to take away his customers.
| 4 | "Te quiero profundamente Paula" | 18 January 2024 | 18 January 2024 | 2.4 | 1.27 |
Lucía warns Rafa to end his affair with Malena or she will tell everything she knows to her father. Natalia wants to take advantage of Paula's illness. Paula manages to negotiate with Pepe a time in which he will allow her to sell her paninis in front of the restaurant. Rolando discusses with Paula the promise he made to Germán about taking care of his family if he should be absent; she asks him for the same promise. Paula warns Emiliano and Diego that from now on, they will have to work to be able to afford the luxuries they have been living with.
| 5 | "Ya no creo en ti, Malena" | 19 January 2024 | 19 January 2024 | 2.0 | 1.15 |
Paula discovers Susy's sleeping habits and asks her children for a chance to integrate into the dynamic, showing that she wants to be a better mother. Pepe complains to Malena for not being there while they were celebrating Teo's birthday and she takes the opportunity to seduce him. Rolando discovers that Paula has a list of things to do before departing and questions her about it, Paula confesses that she has a terminal illness. Lorenzo confronts Isabela to confirm his suspicion that Rafa is his son.
| 6 | "Pepe y Paula son amantes" | 22 January 2024 | 22 January 2024 | 2.2 | 1.24 |
Andrea defends Lucía from Renata's threats, exposing her to Emiliano. Malena confronts Pepe for spending time with Paula during Teo's birthday and to make her angry, he tells her that he likes Paula. Natalia warns Rolando that if he betrays her, she will reveal to Paula that he is behind Germán's death. Malena complains to Isabela and Alejandro for criticizing her while Pepe walks around town with his new lover, Paula.
| 7 | "Paula nos quiere robar a tu papá" | 23 January 2024 | 23 January 2024 | 2.3 | 1.25 |
Isabela tells Gracia that she was forced to cancel her second honeymoon for fear that Lorenzo will continue to investigate his suspicion that Rafa is his son. Malena threatens Paula to stay away from Pepe, as she is not willing to let him go so easily. Andrea makes Diego a condition for her to return his camera, a romantic date around town. Malena manipulates Teo, warning him that Paula wants to take Pepe away from them.
| 8 | "¿Qué haces besando a Paula?" | 24 January 2024 | 24 January 2024 | 2.3 | 1.32 |
Susy asks Paula that if she ever gets married, she should marry Rolando. Diego arrives for his date with Andrea but when he sees her planning their life together, he puts a stop to it by confessing that he is gay. Paula again mistakes Pepe for Germán and kisses him in gratitude for saving her life. Teo confronts Pepe about a video circulating on social media of him kissing Paula.
| 9 | "¿Te casarías conmigo, Rolando?" | 25 January 2024 | 25 January 2024 | 2.2 | 1.19 |
Rafa hates himself for secretly meeting with Malena while she assures him that she will get Pepe back no matter what it costs her. Alex warns Malena that they must make sure the Lugo family leaves Lagos de San Juan, otherwise they could lose everything they have built. Lorenzo asks Paula to consider marrying Rolando because he is the best person to take care of her children the day she is gone. Paula listens to Lorenzo and surprises Rolando with a marriage proposal.
| 10 | "Ojalá te hubieras muerto, Paula" | 26 January 2024 | 26 January 2024 | 2.3 | 1.17 |
Malena decides to set Paula's food truck on fire to make her and her family leave town for good. Rolando realizes that on Paula's list is her desire to help Diego find love. Rolando agrees to marry Paula on the condition that they give each other a chance as a real couple. Malena confesses her wish that Paula had not survived her fall and Paula responds with a slap.
| 11 | "Paula se va para siempre" | 29 January 2024 | 29 January 2024 | 2.1 | 1.16 |
Lorenzo confronts Isabela with the results of the DNA test and thanks to her reaction, he confirms that Rafa is his son. Pepe breaks the pact he made with Paula and asks her to stop selling food in front of his restaurant even though the land belongs to her. Rolando tries to get out of the agreement with Natalia, but she warns him that she has a taped confession of how Germán died. Paula decides to return to the city to spend her last days at home, but her children intervene to stay in Lagos de San Juan.
| 12 | "¿Estás embarazada, Malena?" | 30 January 2024 | 30 January 2024 | 2.2 | 1.14 |
Malena confesses that she does not love her children, because since they were born, they have stolen Pepe's love and attention. Emiliano tells Paula about the fear he saw in Susy and asks her to tell him the truth about her health. Malena tries to seduce Pepe with the intention of making him responsible for her pregnancy and keeping him by her side. Pepe overhears Malena talking to Rafa about her pregnancy and is disappointed to have proof of her infidelity.
| 13 | "Quiero que seas el padre del bebé, Pepe" | 31 January 2024 | 31 January 2024 | 2.3 | 1.36 |
Malena asks Pepe to take responsibility of her baby as his own to start a family again. Paula records the first of several messages she will leave for her children after she has passed away. Thanks to Pepe, Rolando learns about the kiss he had with Paula while they were rappelling down the waterfall. Renata encounters Lucía on her way home and tries to run her over for separating her from Emiliano.
| 14 | "Rafael sí es tu hijo, Lorenzo" | 1 February 2024 | 1 February 2024 | 1.9 | 1.18 |
Paula begins to lose her sight and goes into crisis. Renata visits Lucía with the excuse of thanking her for saving her life, but in reality she is teasing her for having stolen Emiliano's attention. Isabela confesses to Paula and Pepe that Rafa is indeed Lorenzo's son. Pepe and Paula regret realizing that their parents' marriage was not as perfect as they had imagined; they both agree to keep the secret.
| 15 | "Los milagros existen, Paula" | 2 February 2024 | 2 February 2024 | 2.1 | 1.08 |
Isabela confesses to Pepe all about her infidelity and how grateful she is to Alex for forgiving her. Renata pretends to support Emiliano to keep him away from Lucía while she regains his love. Malena tries to explain her point of view to Lucía while Lucía throws in her face that she is the one who failed the whole family. Despite having a good relationship again, Pepe begs Paula to return to the city and take her father with her.
| 16 | "No puedo dejar de pensar en ti" | 5 February 2024 | 5 February 2024 | 2.1 | 1.16 |
Pepe can no longer bear the love he feels for Paula and confessed it to her, not knowing that Rolando heard everything. Isabela is confused about her feelings for Lorenzo and is afraid that she cannot stop loving him. Emiliano falls into the tension he feels with Renata around and goes back to drinking alcohol. Pepe is moved by his son's request and tells Malena that he will take responsibility of her baby.
| 17 | "Nunca es tarde para amar, Paula" | 6 February 2024 | 6 February 2024 | 2.0 | 1.14 |
Pepe kisses Paula and she reciprocates. Isabela already knows that Malena is expecting her lover's child and asks Rafa to tell her who it is. Tired of the closeness between Isabela and Lorenzo, Alex asks Lorenzo to stay away from his family. Rolando is upset because Lorenzo wants to give Alex his land back, but neither he nor Natalia are willing to lose.
| 18 | "Si te casas, me pierdes como hijo" | 7 February 2024 | 7 February 2024 | 2.2 | 1.29 |
Malena assures Isabel that if Pepe does not want to be the father of the baby she is expecting, she will get rid of him. Rolando killed Paula's husband and he is willing to do the same with Pepe. Lorenzo doesn't want to waste any more time to spend with Rafa and almost reveals to him that he is his father. Diego suspects that something is wrong with Paula and strongly opposes her wedding to Rolando.
| 19 | "Quédate conmigo esta noche, Paula" | 8 February 2024 | 8 February 2024 | N/A | 1.13 |
Rafa no longer wants to be compared to Pepe or feel that he is behind him for everything. Rolando wants to go a step further in his relationship with Paula and asks her to spend the night together. Although he talked to his brother, Emiliano believes that Diego did not listen to him and left the house to punish Paula. Malena tries at all costs to regain Pepe's love and does not mind lying to get it.
| 20 | "No me voy a alejar de ti, Pepe" | 9 February 2024 | 9 February 2024 | N/A | 1.08 |
Malena does not miss the opportunity to get close to Pepe again and kisses him passionately. Alex can't forgive Isabela for her closeness with Lorenzo and could put an end to their relationship. Natalia meets Rafa and draws her attention, she also knows that he is Lorenzo's son. Paula confesses to Pepe the great love she also feels for him.
| 21 | "¿Te acostaste con Pepe?" | 12 February 2024 | 12 February 2024 | N/A | 1.25 |
Rafa begins to trust Lorenzo to discuss with him topics that he cannot discuss with anyone else in town. Paula is forced to spend the night with Pepe and enjoys the realization that she is fulfilling the resolutions she had set for herself. Isabela is surprised to see Alex packing his bags to leave the house again to give their relationship a rest. Pepe realizes that despite the affection between him and Paula, the time has come to return to reality and face their respective lives.
| 22 | "No voy a casarme contigo, Rolando" | 13 February 2024 | 13 February 2024 | N/A | 1.17 |
Paula asks Rolando to reconsider their engagement as her romance with Pepe has her confused. Rafa suspects that he received less affection than his brother because of a big secret that could involve Lorenzo. Rolando demands that Pepe stay away from Paula or he will be forced to confess the secret he and Paula are keeping. Lorenzo warns Isabela that he will not give up until he gets her love back.
| 23 | "Quiero que Rolando sea mi papá" | 14 February 2024 | 14 February 2024 | N/A | 1.12 |
Rafa confronts Lorenzo to find out if he still has something with Isabela and Lorenzo tells him the truth. Pepe and Paula help each other to find their children, although Malena does not like the idea of seeing them together again. Malena takes Teo out of the place where she had him hidden to convince Pepe that it is best to get back together. Pepe takes Malena to the hospital, as an intense pain makes her fear that she might lose the baby she is expecting.
| 24 | "¿Tú y yo podríamos formar una familia?" | 15 February 2024 | 15 February 2024 | N/A | 1.23 |
Diego is suspicious about Rolando's change since he got engaged to Paula and fears he has other intentions. Andrea remembers her conversations with Rafa and worries that he is Malena's lover. Pepe proposes to Paula to break off their relationships to live a life together but she knows she doesn't have much time left to give. Malena pressures Pepe to get back together with her and ends up stealing a kiss from him in front of Paula.
| 25 | "El amor no puede estar en mi lista de pendientes" | 16 February 2024 | 16 February 2024 | N/A | 1.15 |
Paula tells Pepe that despite their love for each other, they must each move on with their lives. Paula asks Rolando to resume their wedding plans but is surprised by his sudden refusal. Andrea demands that Malena confess to everyone who her lover is or she will. Rolando is disgusted to imagine Paula consumed by her illness and assures that for love, he is willing to kill her before seeing her like this.
| 26 | "Te voy a amar hasta el final, Pepe" | 19 February 2024 | 19 February 2024 | N/A | 1.27 |
Paula insists on asking Pepe to return to his life with Malena and he demands the reason why she has to marry Rolando. Emiliano gives Lucía a farewell gift so that even though she will never see him again, she will never forget him. Paula prepares a video in which she confesses to Pepe the reasons why she could not marry him. Paula continues to fulfill her list of resolutions with the support of her family.
| 27 | "Estás tentando al destino, Paula" | 20 February 2024 | 20 February 2024 | N/A | 1.28 |
Pepe tells Malena that after much consideration, he has decided to forgive her in the name of his children's happiness. Natalia suggests Rolando to use Diego's secret to his advantage to convince him to approve his marriage to Paula. Paula has to be admitted to the hospital and Lorenzo takes the opportunity to ask her to reconsider her marriage with Rolando. Malena offers Andrea information about her mother in exchange for not divulging the identity of her lover.
| 28 | "Necesito tu amor para vivir, Pepe" | 21 February 2024 | 21 February 2024 | N/A | 1.07 |
As a survivor, Rosa offers Paula the advice that helped her overcome the tumor that threatened her life. Faced with Andrea's threats, Rafa offers her the chance to move to the city and leave everything behind. Diego is proud of Paula for listening to him and gathering the courage to fight for her true love. Paula asks Pepe for a chance to live their love but Malena mocks her by throwing in her face that they are expecting a child.
| 29 | "¡Me voy a robar a la novia!" | 22 February 2024 | 23 February 2024 | N/A | 1.16 |
Pepe accepts Malena's child as his own but asks for space, as he is not willing to sleep with her. Pepe cannot stand the idea of Paula marrying Rolando without love and decides to take her away on her wedding day. Paula refuses to give herself another chance with Pepe for fear that he will abandon the child he is expecting with Malena. Lorenzo learns that Natalia put a price on the land she supposedly gave to the Castillo family.
| 30 | "Los declaro marido y mujer" | 23 February 2024 | 26 February 2024 | N/A | 1.31 |
Diego decides to borrow Rolando's car to pick up the judge, but plans to take him far away to avoid Paula and Rolando's wedding. Pepe arrives at Paula's house looking for his jacket but is stunned when he sees her wearing her wedding dress. Paula sees Pepe's visit as a sign and gives him one last chance to stop her from marrying Rolando. Despite not loving him, Paula marries Rolando.
| 31 | "Sí, yo soy el amante de Malena" | 26 February 2024 | 27 February 2024 | 2.4 | 1.19 |
Paula fears she has made a mistake by marrying Rolando, as she says that only with Pepe does she feel alive. Pepe receives Andrea's message accusing Rafa of being Malena's mysterious lover. Pepe despises Rafa for breaking up the family and mocks him and Malena, assuring that they belong together. Rolando refuses to accept Paula's fate and begs her to focus on beating her illness to live a happy life.
| 32 | "Cuida tu vida, Emiliano" | 27 February 2024 | 28 February 2024 | 2.1 | 1.17 |
Renata is furious when she receives a photo of Emiliano with Lucía and runs to demand that she stay away from her boyfriend. Rafa is rejected by his entire family but suffers the greatest pain when he sees that Andrea is unable to forgive him. Pepe learns that Lucía already knew about Malena's infidelity and decides to kick Malena out of the house for having caused his daughter's pain. Emiliano prepares to travel to Europe and Paula dedicates emotional words to him fearing that it will be the last time she will see him.
| 33 | "¿Cuánto tiempo de vida me quedará?" | 28 February 2024 | 29 February 2024 | 2.0 | 1.15 |
Andrea sends Emiliano the video of Renata attacking Lucía and he decides to leave her at the airport. Paula fears that her children will find out about her illness thanks to the radiation therapy and decides to cancel her treatment. Andrea explains to Pepe that it was she who left him the letter exposing Rafa's betrayal regardless of the fact that he was her father. Paula tries to convince Pepe to give Malena a chance for the sake of the child they are expecting and he explains the truth about her pregnancy.
| 34 | "Contigo, todo se vuelve mágico" | 29 February 2024 | 1 March 2024 | 2.1 | 1.06 |
Paula tries to convince Pepe to go to the hospital while someone takes pictures of them. Natalia gives Alex and Isabela back the money from the purchase of the land but he refuses regardless of the fact that they are drowning in debt. Rolando lets Diego know that he is aware of his secret and offers him an alternative in exchange for him to stop meddling in his marriage. Paula confesses to Pepe how good she feels when she is with him and kisses him without thinking that she is married to Rolando.
| 35 | "Ninguna mujer va a estar con Pepe" | 1 March 2024 | 4 March 2024 | 1.8 | 1.14 |
Rafa refuses to form a family with Malena, assuring that he will never fall into her arms again. Malena complains to Pepe for shouting in front of everyone his love for Paula and he demands her to stop considering herself his wife. Rolando is once again displaced by Pepe and assures that he will take revenge. Paula decides to try alternative medicine to cure herself and begins to add Pepe to her future.
| 36 | "Para que seas un hombre libre, Pepe" | 4 March 2024 | 5 March 2024 | 2.1 | 1.07 |
Emiliano learns that Renata is having a hard time during her trip to Europe and fears that she is doing something foolish because of her depression. Rolando threatens Pepe to keep him away from Paula and warns him that Malena knows another family secret, so it is in his best interest to keep her on his side. Malena is fed up with the Castillo family's disdain and offers Pepe the chance to put an end to their marriage.
| 37 | "Pepe es tu motor para vivir" | 5 March 2024 | 6 March 2024 | 2.2 | 1.05 |
Lorenzo sees Pepe as a possibility for Paula to fight for her life and asks her to fight for his love. Pepe asks Rafa to help him understand the love between him and Malena to allow them to be happy together. Emiliano confronts Malena to let him go out with Andrea but she prefers to threaten him in order to avoid any bond with Paula. Paula decides to start the treatment to fight the tumor in her brain and while she rests, she dreams of a better life with Pepe.
| 38 | "Anular mi matrimonio con Rolando" | 6 March 2024 | 7 March 2024 | 2.1 | 1.14 |
Rafa rejects Malena when he realizes that she is an unreliable person who would end up being unfaithful to him in the same way she did with Pepe. Paula confesses to Lorenzo that she was wrong to marry Rolando and prefers to pursue her dream of having a life with Pepe. Paula surprises Natalia with the news that she wants to annul her marriage to Rolando and change her will. Paula asks Pepe for a chance to talk and confesses to Rolando her plans to divorce.
| 39 | "¡Paula es mi mujer!" | 7 March 2024 | 8 March 2024 | 2.3 | 1.10 |
Rolando warns Natalia that knowing her biggest secret, he will no longer give in to her constant blackmail. Natalia proposes to Rolando to allow the romance between Pepe and Paula in order to seize her fortune. Rolando asks Pepe to consider joining him once he discovers the real reason behind his marriage to Paula. Malena sees Emiliano again with Andrea and decides to confront Paula to put an end to the relationship once and for all.
| 40 | "¿Te lanzas conmigo?" | 8 March 2024 | 11 March 2024 | 1.9 | 1.14 |
Lorenzo points out to Rolando that his selfishness is becoming a problem for Paula and advises him to annul their marriage once and for all. Rafa brings Lorenzo and Isabela together to get him out of his doubts about his biological father. Paula confesses to Pepe that she loves him desperately and asks him to give her a real chance to live their relationship. Rolando discovers that he is not on Paula's list of priorities and complains about all the time he has invested in the family since she became a widow.
| 41 | "Me voy a casar" | 11 March 2024 | 12 March 2024 | 2.2 | 0.95 |
Rolando asks Paula to stay married even though she is with Pepe or he will be forced to take custody of her children. Paula agrees to stay married to Rolando, worried that her children will have someone to love them the day she is gone. Malena convinces Rafa to stay in Mexico on the condition that they get married and while they celebrate their engagement, Teo discovers them. Malena criticizes Pepe for being with Paula and when he stops her, she explains that she will marry Rafa.
| 42 | "Tú eres mala mamá" | 12 March 2024 | 13 March 2024 | 2.1 | 1.08 |
Rolando threatens Diego with conversion therapy if he continues to meddle in his marriage. Andrea proposes to Diego that they become boyfriend and girlfriend to free him once and for all from Rolando and Renata's suspicions regarding his sexual preferences. Malena assures that Teo is the reason why she divorced Pepe, because he should have insisted that they not separate. Pepe asks Paula to tell him the truth behind her marriage, as this is the only way he will be able to decide if he wants to be her lover or not.
| 43 | "No voy a ser su amante" | 13 March 2024 | 14 March 2024 | 2.0 | 1.14 |
Susy and Teo confront their parents about what Malena is saying about their relationship. Lorenzo serenades Isabela with a song that reminds them of the past they shared. Isabela laments her sons' bad decisions, assuring them that it is all because of the past she shared with Lorenzo. Natalia warns Gracia to keep her secret but Gracia shows her that she is not afraid of her threats.
| 44 | "Estoy hecho pedazos por ti, Paula" | 14 March 2024 | 15 March 2024 | 2.2 | 1.14 |
Diego loses his fear of Natalia's blackmail and threatens to reveal her big secret to Paula. Malena offers Emiliano a drink to smooth things over, embarrassing him in front of Lucía and Diego. Paula confronts Rolando for blackmailing Pepe and Isabela to reveal who Rafa's real father is and demands that he pack his things and leave her house. Emiliano admits to having had a drinking problem in the past and Lucía despises Malena for exposing him.
| 45 | "Para toda la vida" | 15 March 2024 | 18 March 2024 | 2.0 | 1.07 |
Lorenzo takes advantage of Alex leaving Isabela to ask her to give him another chance to be happy together. Diego plans to take the opportunity of Lorenzo and Rafa's closeness to find out more information about Andrea's mother. Despite losing her baby, Malena pressures Rafa to get married before her pregnancy shows. Paula decides to tell Pepe everything about her illness but Rolando prevents their meeting.
| 46 | "Siempre, la verdad es mejor" | 18 March 2024 | 19 March 2024 | 1.9 | 1.10 |
Andrea takes Diego to his new school, where he catches a glimpse of Arturo in the distance and is immediately charmed. Pepe tries to comfort Paula and accidentally pulls a lock of her hair, making evident one of the side effects of the cancer treatment. Malena mocks Isabela when she sees her in a romantic moment with Lorenzo. Rolando tells Emiliano everything about Paula's illness.
| 47 | "Necesito que seas fuerte" | 19 March 2024 | 20 March 2024 | 2.2 | 1.04 |
Isabela prefers to continue with the life she has, so she asks Lorenzo to leave Lagos de San Juan. Emiliano looks for Paula desperate to know if what Rolando told him is true. Emiliano forbids Paula to let herself be overcome by the tumor, as he assures her that he is not ready to lose her. Arturo admires that Andrea is not afraid to speak her mind and asks her to be his first genuine friend.
| 48 | "Son padre e hijo" | 20 March 2024 | 22 March 2024 | 2.2 | 0.98 |
Pepe confirms the news that Malena had a third man in her life and Rafa explodes at the news of her infidelity. Paula forbids Diego to be Andrea's boyfriend and is surprised to learn that she is actually his first cousin. Isabela confesses to Alex that Rafa is not his son but Alex reveals that he knew from the beginning that Rafa was not his son and still loved him like a father. Diego brings Lorenzo and Andrea together, as she needs his help to find her mother.
| 49 | "Entre la realidad y la fantasía" | 21 March 2024 | 25 March 2024 | N/A | 1.27 |
Diego interrupts the discussion between Paula and Natalia to let her know that Natalia has been Rolando's lover, adding this to his list of lies. Rolando hires Natalia to represent him in court, because during the divorce, he is willing to take everything from Paula, including her children. Rolando interrupts the gathering between Paula and Pepe's children with his complains for getting together as soon as she kicked him out of her house. Isabela confesses to Rafa that she is giving herself a chance with Lorenzo and he complains to her for involving him in her infidelity.
| 50 | "¿Quieres ser mi novia?" | 22 March 2024 | 26 March 2024 | 2.2 | 1.10 |
Paula asks Emiliano about the alleged drinking problem he suffered after his father's death. Susy and Teo are happy to see their parents happy so they organize a surprise for them to become a couple once and for all. Rafa confronts Lorenzo to get him away from Isabela, who is forced to confess that Lorenzo is his real father. Pepe and Paula gather their children to tell them the news that they are already a couple.
| 51 | "Me está robando la vida" | 25 March 2024 | 27 March 2024 | 2.0 | 1.23 |
Rafa is disappointed in Isabela and Alex for having lied to him all his life, but he feels a particular disdain for his mother. Paula's pain returns and she sees it as an omen that her imminent death is near, fearing that she has not achieved happiness. Pepe learns that Paula is feeling ill again and is genuinely worried. Rafa feels betrayed when he learns that Pepe was already aware of the situation of his origin.
| 52 | "Aprendí a no necesitarte" | 26 March 2024 | 28 March 2024 | 2.0 | 1.17 |
Rolando tries to get Emiliano's support to go against Paula during the interdiction trial. Diego confesses to Paula that he is gay and she demands that he take some time to talk about it as adults. Diego refuses to talk to Paula, claiming that after so much time without her, he has learned not to need her. Isabela sees Pepe more in love every day and demands that Paula tell him the truth about her diagnosis.
| 53 | "Debí decírtelo antes" | 27 March 2024 | 1 April 2024 | 2.2 | 1.04 |
Paula tries to calm Emiliano's anger by acknowledging Diego's effort to finally come clean with his family. Paula takes Pepe on a walk by the lake, where she confesses to him that she has little time left to live and is surprised to see Pepe understanding and willing to fight against the diagnosis to achieve a long life together. Rolando returns to Paula's house accompanied by a psychiatric expert to certify her inability to make decisions.
| 54 | "La importancia de la lealtad" | 28 March 2024 | 2 April 2024 | 1.9 | 1.01 |
Feeling assaulted by Rolando, Paula doubts a little about Natalia's honesty as a friend and lawyer. The situation of the medical examiner is something that worries Paula, she tells Pepe everything but does not want to worry Lorenzo. Gracia receives the news that Rosa's cancer has returned much stronger. Rolando tells Malena about Paula's situation and how she could get Pepe back, but her marriage to Rafa would have to be cancelled.
| 55 | "Todo tiene una razón" | 29 March 2024 | 3 April 2024 | 1.5 | 0.94 |
In addition to the cancer returning, Natalia learns that Rosa is not her biological mother. In the middle of an argument, Paula gives in and promises Diego that she will tell him everything, but after Susy's surprise party. Paula and Pepe's plan works and they manage to surprise Susy a few days before her birthday. Paula gets the courage and in the middle of a game, decides to tell her children about her health condition.
| 56 | "Necesito que mi mamá me perdone" | 1 April 2024 | 4 April 2024 | 2.3 | 1.07 |
Paula faces Susy's rejection at the news that she might lose her mother. Diego remembers every complaint he made to Paula for trying to get close and regrets having pushed her away from his life. Malena offers Paula her sympathy for dealing with her illness and Paula asks her to support Pepe if she should lose the battle. Malena confesses to Rigoberto the real reason she agreed to marry Rafa and asks for his help in carrying out her plan.
| 57 | "Nunca fuiste digno de Paula" | 2 April 2024 | 5 April 2024 | 2.3 | 1.04 |
Diego confesses the reason why he suspected of Rolando's intentions since his father's death. Rafa points out to Lorenzo that since he is his son, he should also get a share of his fortune. Arturo looks for Diego to find out if he will also go to Rafa's wedding and Paula suspects that he is interested in her son. Rigoberto arrives armed at Malena and Rafa's wedding, determined to steal the bride no matter who gets in the way.
| 58 | "Quiero que Pepe se sienta culpable" | 3 April 2024 | 8 April 2024 | 2.2 | 0.99 |
Malena meets with Rolando to finalize her plan to separate Pepe from Paula. Rafa learns that Malena lost her baby and blames Pepe for causing this. Paula proposes to take a step further in her relationship with Pepe so that she can enjoy the time she has left to live with him. Malena is horrified to see that as a result of the fall, her face was disfigured.
| 59 | "Mamá y papá de cinco" | 4 April 2024 | 9 April 2024 | 1.9 | 1.10 |
Diego asks to accompany Paula to her treatment to show that he is willing to fight by her side against the tumor that could shorten her life. Pepe decides to accept Paula's proposal to move into her house to form a big family together. Paula learns that Natalia took possession of the Castillo family's land to put it up for sale and pay for Rosa's treatment. Rafa tries to fix his problems with Malena but she confesses what she really thinks of him.
| 60 | "Tutor provisional de todos tus bienes" | 5 April 2024 | 10 April 2024 | 1.8 | 0.91 |
Rolando announces that he has gained guardianship of Paula, her assets and her family, leaving her at his mercy. Paula realizes that what Diego told her about Germán's funeral was true, blaming Rolando for his death. Rolando assures Lorenzo that there is no one more capable than him to defend Paula's interests. Natalia offers to sell Rafa the Castillo's land in order to save the family from bankruptcy.
| 61 | "Te vas a arrepentir Rolando" | 8 April 2024 | 11 April 2024 | 1.9 | 0.96 |
Rolando comes to live in Paula's house and assures her that with the injunction she cannot divorce him, much less annul their marriage. Paula cannot remember where she keeps her clothes, Pepe tries to help her, but she begins to feel sick and faints. Andrea organizes a march to expose Renata's harassment and after facing her, gives the order for her to be arrested. Knowing what is happening inside the company, Natalia threatens Rolando with revealing to Paula that he is the murderer of the father of her children.
| 62 | "Qué grandes están nuestros hijos, Paula" | 9 April 2024 | 12 April 2024 | 1.9 | 1.00 |
Paula hallucinates Germán again, but this time she feels as if he were still alive in front of her. Rafa asks Lorenzo for ten million pesos to start a new life without worries next to Andrea. Paula is worried and Rosa explains to her that maybe Germán is the personification of her tumor. Natalia manages to escape from Rolando to confess to Paula everything she knows about Germán's death.
| 63 | "No pierdas la esperanza" | 10 April 2024 | 15 April 2024 | 2.4 | 1.06 |
Natalia makes Paula believe that Rolando could have saved Germán's life and Paula questions his reasons for not doing so. Rafa brags to Malena that he will go away now that he has Lorenzo's money and she tries to get him back, but it is too late. Rolando realizes that the tumor is affecting Paula's memory and her headache becomes unbearable. Paula refuses to be hospitalized but Rolando uses his power of attorney to force her to get medical attention.
| 64 | "Estoy roto en pedazos por dentro" | 11 April 2024 | 16 April 2024 | 2.1 | 1.08 |
Lorenzo visits Zaida in prison to convince her to meet Andrea, but she rejects the idea. Despite Zaida's pride when she learns what a woman Andrea has become, she is afraid of embarrassing her if she were to discover that she is the daughter of an inmate. Arturo takes Diego and Andrea swimming to distract them from their sorrows but Andrea soon realizes the chemistry between him and Diego. Pepe confesses to Malena his regret for staying strong and she sees it as an opportunity to get closer to him.
| 65 | "Cuando yo ya no esté" | 12 April 2024 | 17 April 2024 | 2.2 | 0.98 |
Lorenzo gives Rafa the money he asked for and Isabela tries to make him think about his economic interest. Lorenzo asks Rolando and Pepe to learn to work together for Paula's sake, as he fears that Natalia's actions will end his daughter's life. Arturo asks Diego how he realized he was gay. Paula refuses to let Rolando take care of her children when she loses her battle with cancer and asks Pepe to be a father to them the day she is gone.
| 66 | "Yo no tengo toda la vida por delante" | 15 April 2024 | 18 April 2024 | 2.1 | 1.06 |
A spark between Alex and Gracia makes them both remember Isabela's jealousy. Diego rejects Paula when he finds out that despite proton therapy, her life expectancy remains the same. Isabela tries to get Rafa to think about his plans to make a new life, but he believes that money can solve all of his problems. Paula tries to escape from her problems but her headache causes the van to crash.
| 67 | "Debería dejar ir a Pepe" | 16 April 2024 | 19 April 2024 | 2.2 | 1.02 |
Teresa assures the entire town that Malena planned for Rigoberto to interrupt her wedding as an escape plan and Rafa listens to them. The judge handling Zaida's case approves her conditional release thanks to her outstanding conduct in prison. Lorenzo tells Pepe that Zaida will be released thanks to his help and asks him to listen to her for Andrea's sake. Paula realizes Pepe's sacrifice to keep an eye on her and decides to return him favor by breaking up with him.
| 68 | "No estás sola" | 17 April 2024 | 22 April 2024 | 2.3 | 1.04 |
Zaida complains to Pepe for the damage done to Andrea by making her believe that her own mother had abandoned her. Natalia is disappointed to learn that Gracia is her real mother, causing Rosa to become ill when confronted with her rejection. Paula listens to Rosa's advice and confronts the personification of her tumor to try to reach an agreement. Paula recognizes the love Malena still feels for Pepe and confesses her plans to separate from him.
| 69 | "Ayúdame a irme en paz" | 18 April 2024 | 23 April 2024 | 2.1 | 1.06 |
Malena assures Pepe that after her accident she has been able to reevaluate her life and is ready to move away from her business and devote herself to her children. Paula decides to end her relationship with Pepe and conspires with Malena a plan to get him out of her life for good. Emiliano recognizes that he has a drinking problem and accepts Pepe's advice to seek professional help. Paula confronts Pepe with her decision to end their relationship but he suspects that she wants him away to avoid his suffering.
| 70 | "¿A eso le llamas amor?" | 19 April 2024 | 24 April 2024 | 1.8 | 0.93 |
Renata asks Rolando for help to prevent Lucía and Emiliano from reconciling. Andrea assures that Arturo is completely in love with her but Diego asks her to reconsider, because he believes that she is not the one he is really interested in. Malena takes advantage of the fact that Paula ended her relationship with Pepe to confess that despite everything they have been through, she has not stopped loving him.
| 71 | "Nunca voy a soltarte" | 22 April 2024 | 26 April 2024 | 2.0 | 1.10 |
Paula can't believe that everyone in the company is turning their backs on her and feels used by everyone. Arturo can't stand the peer pressure at school and kisses Andrea, unaware that Diego is watching them. Paula can't hide her feelings for Pepe and apologizes to him, both are convinced that they will stay together for life. Rolando questions Paula about her feelings and she affirms that she loves Pepe above all else.
| 72 | "En todos mis planes estás tú" | 23 April 2024 | 29 April 2024 | 2.2 | 1.00 |
Arturo looks for Diego and assures him that he is confused about how he feels. Rolando confesses to Natalia that her mother's health is very serious. Malena looks for Zaida as if nothing has happened, but is met with rejection. Zaida complains to Malena for leaving her at the most difficult moment of her life. Paula talks to Pepe about the time she has left to live, but he refuses to lose her.
| 73 | "Germán te iba a dejar" | 24 April 2024 | 30 April 2024 | 2.0 | 1.01 |
Rafael agrees to talk to Zaida and she confesses the difficult moment she went to jail. After listening to her daughter, Malena defends Lucía at all costs from Renata's wickedness. Natalia confronts Paula and ends up revealing that she was Germán's lover. Paula refuses to believe this news. Rolando makes Paula believe that Natalia told the truth, but she remembers what really happened with Germán the day of the accident.
| 74 | "¿En qué momento me enamoré de Alex?" | 25 April 2024 | 1 May 2024 | 2.0 | 0.94 |
Zaida is free and returns to make up for lost time with Andrea, not caring what Alex and Isabella think. Diego is very hurt by Arturo and Andrea's relationship because he is sure that he has no feelings for her. Although Pepe does everything to make Paula feel better, the disease and her treatment have her very weak. Gracia can no longer hide her feelings for Alex and assures him that he will not be alone.
| 75 | "Los muertos no hablan" | 26 April 2024 | 2 May 2024 | 2.1 | 1.00 |
Teresa finds Malena and confronts her for having caused a misfortune in her family and is willing to show the evidence she has. Andrea meets Zaida, but Rafa prefers to hide her true identity. Although everything is going perfectly, Andrea suspects that something strange is going on. Lorenzo takes advantage of the fact that Isabela is alone to propose that they spend a moment together. Teresa looks for Pepe to tell him the whole truth about Malena, but Malena decides to push her behind the food truck and is run over by Pepe.
| 76 | "Tu tiempo con nosotros terminó" | 29 April 2024 | 3 May 2024 | 2.0 | 0.86 |
Malena asks Natalia to help her solve once and for all her problem with Teresa before she tells Pepe everything she knows. Paula calls Rolando out for trying to put Diego in conversion therapy and demands that he stay away from her family. Arturo helps Andrea open a dating profile in Diego's name and as he describes him, he lets his true feelings for him show. Alex acknowledges the love and support he has received from Gracia since his separation from Isabela and asks her for a chance to try to be happy together.
| 77 | "La gente no es lo que parece" | 30 April 2024 | 6 May 2024 | 2.1 | 1.22 |
Zaida demands answers from Malena for having lied to Rafa about the real reason she was in jail. Rolando assures Susy that the only reason Pepe is with Paula is to get her fortune. Rafa follows Zaida's advice and asks Lorenzo for help in recovering his family's restaurant. Natalia warns Paula that thanks to her public declaration of her illness, the company has been paying the consequences and will soon be bankrupt.
| 78 | "Mi tiempo se está agotando" | 1 May 2024 | 7 May 2024 | 1.9 | 1.13 |
Rolando listens to Renata's advice and opens a profile on the same dating app that Diego uses to make him pay for his betrayal. Alex manages to convince Gracia to start a relationship. Natalia gives Rosa the option of leaving the country to start a new life but she suspects that her daughter is trying to escape from the Lugo family. Paula refuses to be hospitalized when she learns that Susy left school early and no one knows where she is.
| 79 | "Es momento de prepararse" | 2 May 2024 | 8 May 2024 | 2.2 | 1.05 |
Arturo seeks out Diego to try to repair their friendship without knowing that he is dealing with the fear of losing his mother. Diego explains to Arturo that the reason their friendship can never be the same is because he fell in love with him. Rafa prepares a romantic dinner to ask Zaida for another chance but she pressures him to tell Andrea that she is really her mother. Seeing the desperation of the children to see their mother again, Rosa prays to the Virgin of Guadalupe to save Paula's life and offers her life in exchange.
| 80 | "Rolando es como un tumor" | 3 May 2024 | 9 May 2024 | 1.9 | 1.05 |
Rolando assures Diego that he will cure him as soon as Paula passes away, but Emiliano shows him that he is willing to fight for his siblings. Andrea brags to Malena how happy Rafa is with his new girlfriend, but Malena takes it upon herself to reveal that his girlfriend was in jail. Paula compares Rolando to a tumor and blames herself for bringing him into her family to consume her from the inside. Lorenzo tells Paula that he has found a doctor who is willing to operate on her tumor, giving her one last chance to fight for her life.
| 81 | "Te tengo que dejar" | 6 May 2024 | 10 May 2024 | 2.3 | 0.94 |
Paula is in solidarity with Emiliano when she discovers that his new short film is a documentary about people with cancer and agrees to be interviewed as a survivor of the disease. Pepe discovers that Malena once again manipulated the truth in her favor to hurt her own family and is disappointed to realize that she can never change. Rosa agrees to be hospitalized with Paula's well being in mind, knowing that it may be the last time she sees her. Rolando threatens Paula with taking Susy as far away from her as possible to prevent her from saying goodbye, unless she accepts to distance herself from Pepe until her death.
| 82 | "Pepe acaba de renunciar a ti" | 7 May 2024 | 13 May 2024 | 2.0 | 0.94 |
Lorenzo notices Isabela's jealousy when she learns that Alex will travel to the city with Gracia. Paula decides to stop thinking about her illness to have a heart-to-heart talk with Diego and he confesses the pain that he feels because of his love for Arturo. Rolando arrives victoriously at Paula's house ready to impose his rules to make sure she never sees Pepe again. Paula gets fed up with Rolando's threats and assures him that as long as she is alive, she will not stop fighting for her children and her happiness.
| 83 | "Está dispuesto a operar el tumor" | 8 May 2024 | 14 May 2024 | 2.2 | 1.11 |
Paula receives a glimmer of hope when she learns that the only doctor capable of operating on her has agreed to the surgery. Andrea apologizes to Zaida for judging her and embraces her with love, knowing that she finally has the family she dreamed of. Arturo defends Diego from his friends, as he is now willing to admit his feelings and fight for his love. Malena learns that Rolando is the new owner of the land where her agency is located and offers him her affection in exchange for the property.
| 84 | "Pienso honrar esa promesa" | 9 May 2024 | 15 May 2024 | 1.9 | 1.04 |
Diego asks Arturo to postpone his breakup with Andrea, as he does not want to add more pain to what he is already experiencing at home. Before dying, Rosa gets Natalia to promise to correct her path to become the good person she really is. Rolando visits Malena looking for comfort after having suffered Paula's rejection. Natalia demonstrates her willingness to change by offering Gracia her condolences for her Rosa's death, but is put to the test with Paula's arrival.
| 85 | "La pesadilla terminó" | 10 May 2024 | 17 May 2024 | 1.9 | 0.93 |
Natalia confesses to Pepe all the deceptions and lies that Malena organized to regain his love. Pepe confronts Malena for all her lies, throwing in her face the letter that Rigoberto left to his family explaining her evil plan. Despite her hatred, Natalia offers Paula the chance to get rid of Rolando once and for all. Paula confronts Rolando, unafraid of his blackmail, for having allied with Natalia to make her life miserable.
| 86 | "Me gustas como segunda mamá" | 13 May 2024 | 20 May 2024 | 2.3 | 1.14 |
Paula looks for Pepe to celebrate that thanks to Natalia's help, they will soon be free from Rolando's attempts to separate them. Pepe surprises Paula by presenting her with a wedding ring. Natalia learns that Rosa sacrificed herself so that Paula could be cured, reaffirming the hatred she feels for her. Natalia recovers Rolando's loyalty and puts him to the test by ordering him to kill Malena.
| 87 | "Elegiste tenerme como enemigo" | 14 May 2024 | 21 May 2024 | 2.0 | 1.14 |
Natalia warns Paula that she is no longer willing to help her against Rolando, so she will have to stay married to him. Rolando writes a message on Malena's behalf in which she says goodbye forever to Pepe and her children, as well as admitting her guilt in Rigoberto's death. Paula confronts Rolando for having regained Natalia's support, while he vows to make sure that she will never be happy with Pepe. Rolando is afraid to face Paula in court, but Natalia assures him that she will have no more energy to keep on living when they are done with her.
| 88 | "Mi empresa puede ser tuya" | 15 May 2024 | 22 May 2024 | 1.9 | 1.25 |
Paula assures Rolando that she will soon get rid of him by giving him a restraining order so that he will not come near her or her family again. Patricio warns Paula about the risks involved in the dangerous surgery she wants to undergo to remove the tumor in her head. Diego refuses to make Andrea suffer because of his relationship with Arturo and decides to put an end to it. Paula offers Natalia her company in exchange for her help in getting rid of Rolando for good.
| 89 | "No tenemos un solo centavo" | 16 May 2024 | 24 May 2024 | 2.3 | 1.03 |
Paula accepts Natalia's new deal and asks everyone to leave the house because from now on it belongs to her, along with the rest of her fortune. Following Rosa's will, Gracia gives Paula the documents she kept to make Natalia pay for all her crimes. Now that Natalia no longer has anything to ensure Rolando's loyalty, he demands her to stay away, since from now on he considers her one of his enemies. Renata realizes her mistakes and seeks to make amends by donating a large sum of money for Paula's surgery.
| 90 | "¡Encontré el mejor papá!" | 17 May 2024 | 27 May 2024 | 2.5 | 1.19 |
Arturo faces his fears and plans a big announcement before the game to declare his love for Diego in front of friends and family. With Diego's help, the police manage to catch Rolando, but when he is about to kill Pepe, he is shot by the police and dies. Lorenzo accepts his defeat and puts an end to his relationship with Isabela so that she can be happy with Alex. Paula survives the operation and celebrates with Pepe for fulfilling the dream of having a big family full of love.
