= Roberto Ballesteros =

Mexican actor

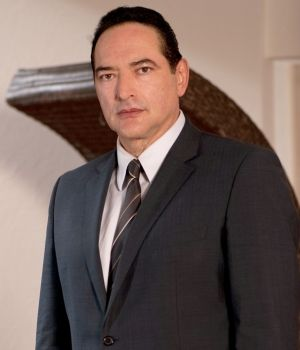
- Ballesteros in 2011
- Born: Eduardo Roberto Ramírez Ochoa; March 22, 1952 (age 74); Torreón, Coahuila, Mexico
- Occupation: Actor
- Years active: 1975–present
- Parent(s): Jorge Ballesteros, Sandra Ballesteros

Roberto Ballesteros (born March 22, 1952) is a Mexican actor. In the United States and Puerto Rico, Ballesteros is sometimes seen working on Univision.

== Career ==
Ballesteros has played a variety of roles during his career, including romantic antagonists and leads. He is usually cast as a villain or as a drug dealer in Mexican action films, but has occasionally played heroes, cops and other roles as well.

Apart from several soap operas, including Rosa salvaje opposite Verónica Castro, Ballesteros has also been in films such as:

- El Dia de Los Albaniles 3, 1987
- Los Verduleros 2, 1987
- El Dia de Los Albaniles 4, 1990
- Keiko en Peligro, 1990
- Alarido del Terror, 1991
- Mujer de Cabaret, 1991
- Retén, 1991
- Persecución Infernal, 1992
- El Trono del Infierno, 1994
- Fuerza Maldita, 1995
- Las Nueve Caras del Miedo, 1995
- Secuestro, 1995
- Venganza Mortal, 1995
- El Destazador, 1996
- El Regreso de la Bestia, 1998
- La Lobo del Aňo, 1999
- Los 6 Mandamientos de la Risa, 1999
- El Seňor de Sinaloa, 2000
- Sangre de Cholo, 2009
- Los Siete, 2010

Ballesteros has also acted in mini-series such as Navidad sin Fin, María Isabel, Cañaveral de Pasiones, María Mercedes, Mujer, Casos de la Vida Real, Simplemente María, Quinceañera and others. He has shared acting credits with other Mexican television and film stars like Castro, Thalia Sodi, Mario Almada, Sebastian Ligalde, Eduardo Palomo, Victoria Ruffo, Jorge Luke and Alfonso Zayas.

== Filmography ==
- Cabo (2022) . . . . Fausto
- Buscando a Frida (2021) .... Fabio Pedroza
- Por amar sin ley (2018-2019) .... Jaime
- Tres veces Ana (2016) .... Tadeo Nájera
- Lo imperdonable (2015) .... Joaquín Arroyo
- Hasta el fin del mundo (2014-2015) .... Félix Tavares
- Como dice el dicho (2014) .... Lisandro
- Qué bonito amor (2012-2013).... Comandante Leonardo Derecho
- Por ella soy Eva (2012) .... Lic. Raúl Mendoza (Villano)
- Llena de amor (2010) .... Bernardo Izquierdo (Villano)
- Camaleones (2009-2010) .... Ricardo Calderón
- Palabra de mujer (2007-2008) .... Genaro Arreola
- Código Postal (2006-2007) .... Bruno Zubieta
- La esposa virgen (2005) .... Cristóbal (Villano)
- Contra viento y marea (2005) .... Arcadio
- Apuesta por un amor (2005) .... Justo Hernández (Villano)
- Amarte es mi pecado (2003) ... Marcelo Previni (Villano)
- Amar otra vez (2003) .... Julio Morales (Villano)
- Niña amada mía (2003) .... Melchor Arrieta
- Navidad sin fin (2001) .... Casimiro
- Sin pecado concebido (2001) .... Teniente Epigmenio Nava
- Mujer bonita (2001) .... Servando
- El precio de tu amor (2000-2001) .... Rodolfo Galván (Villano)
- Por tu amor (1999) .... Sandro Valle
- Cuento de Navidad (1999) .... Gonzalo / Sr. Penumbra
- El diario de Daniela (1998-1999) .... Arturo Barto (Villano)
- Preciosa (1998) .... Sándor (Villano)
- Rencor apasionado (1998) .... Carmelo Camacho (Villano)
- María Isabel (1997) .... Armando Noguera (Villano)
- Mi querida Isabel (1997) .... Federico (Villano)
- Cañaveral de pasiones (1996) .... Rufino Mendoza (Villano)
- La antorcha encendida (1996) .... Vicente Guerrero
- Maria José (1995) .... Joel
- María la del Barrio (1995) .... Fantasma
- Bajo un mismo rostro(1995) .... César
- El vuelo del águila (1994-1995) .... Vicente Guerrero
- María Mercedes (1992-1993) .... Cordelio Cordero Mansó (Villano)
- La pícara soñadora (1991) .... Adolfo Molina (Villano)
- Mi pequeña Soledad (1990) .... Mateo Villaseñor (Villano)
- Simplemente María (1989-1990) .... Arturo D'Angelle (Villano)
- Quinceañera (1987-1988) .... Antonio
- Rosa salvaje (1987-1988) .... Dr. Germán Laprida
- Pobre señorita Limantour (1983) .... Germán
- Pobre juventud (1987) .... Néstor de la Peña
- Vivir un poco (1985) .... Marcos Llanos del Toro (Villano)
- Los años felices (1984) .... Angelo
- Amalia Batista (1983) .... Macario
- Cuando los hijos se van (1983) .... Julio Francisco "Kiko" Mendoza (Villano)
- Sorceress (American film) (1982) .... Traigon villano
- Soledad (1980) .... Martín
- Verónica (1980) .... Lisandro
- Colorina (1980) .... Julián Saldívar
- Los ricos también lloran (1979) .... Camarero
- Viviana (1978) .... José Aparicio
- El Reventon (1975) .... Dancer
