= Víctor Noriega =

Mexican actor, singer and model (born 1972)

- Born: Víctor Enrique Noriega Hernandez; May 10, 1972 (age 53); Mexico City, Mexico

Víctor Noriega (Spanish pronunciation: [ˈbiɣtoɾ noˈɾjeɣa]; born Víctor Enrique Noriega Hernandez May 10, 1972) is a Mexican actor, singer and model.

== Biography ==
Born in Mexico City, he started his career as a model. He then pursued a BA in communications. At the same time he auditioned for a musical group and became part of Garibaldi from 1989 to 1998, in which he was one of the eight original members.

The group reunited in 1999 launching a double CD. He then started his acting career in Mexican soap operas. Later on he mixed his career as a host for several TV shows for Univision and TeleFutura. He recorded an album as solo artist, but it was never released. However he continues to pursue his dream of recording and releasing a CD as a solo artist in the near future.

== Music ==
=== I. Garibaldi ===
The group was formed during a casting by producer Luis de Llano in 1989. It originally cast 11 members, but months later after image testing only eight participants were kept in the group:

- Patricia Manterola, singer/model/actress
- Katia Llanos, entrepreneur in Playa del Carmen, Quintana Roo, Mexico
- Luisa Fernanda, television host for Telemundo, radio host for Univision
- Pilar Montenegro, singer/actress
- Víctor Noriega, actor/singer/model
- Sergio Mayer, actor and producer of Sólo para Mujeres
- Charly López, restaurateur
- Javier Ortiz, actor Sólo para Mujeres and Aventurera

Other members who joined the group upon replacement of the original members were:

- Ingrid Coronado, television host for TV Azteca
- Paola Toyos, actress/model
- Mara Almada, model/TV host

=== Discography ===
- 2010: Garibaldi Bicentenario
- 1999: Reunion 10
- 1994: Caribe
- 1993: Gritos De Guerra, Gritos De Amor
- 1993: Donde Quedo La Bolita
- 1991: Los Hijos De Buda
- 1990: Noche Buena
- 1990: Que Te La Pongo
- 1989: Garibaldi

== II. Víctor Noriega (solo career) ==
In 2001, Víctor Noriega recorded his first solo album with Flamingo Music. However, the album was never released.

=== Discography ===
- 2001: Por un Beso Recorded with Flamingo Music, however, album was never released.

== Filmography ==
Year	Title	Character	Note
2015	Como dice el dicho	Gonzalo	Guest appearance
2013-14	Por Siempre Mi Amor	Fabricio de la Riva Oropeza	Supporting Role
2012-13	Qué bonito amor	Michael Johnson	Supporting Role
2011	Dos Hogares	Dario Colmenares	Supporting Role
2009-10	Hasta Que El Dinero Nos Separe	Marco Valenzuela Aguilera "El Sr. Abogaducho arribista"	Main Antagonist
2008-09	Cuidado con el ángel	Daniel Velarde	Supporting Role
2007-08	Palabra de Mujer	Emmanuel San Roman	Antagonist
2005-06	Peregrina	Eugenio	Supporting Role
2005	El Amor No Tiene Precio	Sebastian Monte y Valle	Protagonist
2003-04	Angel Rebelde	Raul Hernández	Protagonist
2003	Bajo la misma piel	Gabriel Ornelas	Supporting Role
2003	Niña amada mía	Servando Uriarte	Special Appearance
2002	Entre el Amor y el Odio	Paulo Sacristan	Supporting Role
2001	La Intrusa	Dr. Eduardo del Bosque-Colmenares Iturbide	Supporting Role
2000-2001	Por un beso	Daniel Diaz de León	Protagonist
1999-2000	Mujeres engañadas	Pablo Renteria	Antagonist
1999	Rosalinda	Alex Dorantes	Supporting Role
1998-99	Camila	Dr. Wicks	Supporting Role
1998	Rencor Apasionado	Gilberto Monteverde	Co-protagonist

== TV shows ==
His participation in other TV shows include:

- Big Brother VIP: Mexico, in 2002 where he was the second evicted
- El Gordo y la Flaca, he has continuously co-hosted the entertainment news show with Lili Estefan since 2002
- Teleton 20-30 Panama, he was a guest host in 2002
- Objetivo Fama, a reality show in looking for Latin talent. He was the host in 2005
- Premios TV Novelas, 2002 to date. Co-host.

== Movies ==
His participation in movies include:

- 1992: Donde Quedo la Bolita in 1992, in which all the Garibaldi members participated.

== Theatre ==
His participation in theatre includes:

- No Puedo, in 1999 as Roberto Legorreta
- Mame El Musical, in 2014–2015
- El Padre, in 2017-2018
