= Jorge Poza =

Mexican actor

- Born: Jorge Alberto Poza Pérez; 3 January 1978 (age 48); Tulancingo, Hidalgo, Mexico
- Occupation: Actor
- Years active: 1989–present
- Spouse: Mayrín Villanueva (m. 1997; div. 2008)
- Children: 2

Jorge Alberto Poza Pérez (Spanish pronunciation: [ˈxoɾxe ˈposa] born 3 January 1978) is a Mexican film and television actor.

== Biography ==
Poza was born in Tulancingo, Hidalgo, Mexico. He started his acting career in the movie Bandidos in 1990, but his career as a TV actor started in 1992 in the telenovela El abuelo y yo by Pedro Damián along with Gael García Bernal.

In 2001 he worked in the novela Atrévete a olvidarme, which only lasted a month on air, but a couple of months later he was called by the TV producer Carla Estrada to offer him a character in her new novela El Manantial. In 2002 he was called by another TV producer Pedro Damián and was offered his first starring role as professor Francisco Romero in the telenovela Clase 406.

Velo de novia in 2003 represented a new challenge for him, since he had to play two characters: twins Rafael and Ernesto, the first one bad and dominant and the other one good and shy. He also worked in theatre in the play P.D. tu gato ha muerto along with Otto Sirgo. Trying to get away from acting for a while, he hosted a morning TV show called Hoy which has been Televisa's morning show for years, changing the casts in different periods. During his time with the show, he worked with Andrea Legarreta and Vielka Valenzuela.

He also worked on the telenovela Alma de Hierro as the blind son of the famous Mexican actors: Blanca Guerra and Alejandro Camacho. He also played in the first episode of Mujeres Asesinas 3 titled Elena, Protectora' with Rocio Banquells.

In 2011 he starred in the Mexican version of Rafaela with Scarlet Ortiz and produced by Nathalie Lartilleux. The following year, in 2012, he played his first antagonistic in Cachito de Cielo with Maite Perroni and Pedro Fernandez. In 2014, he had his second main antagonistic as Pablo's, brother Mariano Martinez Negrete, in the Mexican version's La Gata with reunited his co-star Maite Perroni and Daniel Arenas, under the production of Nathalie Larrilleux.

== Personal life ==
In 1997 he married actress Mayrín Villanueva, whom he met while filming the telenovela Preciosa in that same year. Although they divorced in 2008, the couple had 2 children: Romina and Sebastián, who were born in 2003. From 2009 until 2012, he dated actress Zuria Vega while filming Alma de hierro. In 2016 he began dating actress Ilse Ikeda whom he met while filming El hotel de los secretos in that same year.

== Filmography ==
=== Films ===
Year	Title	Role	Notes
1991	Bandidos	Miguel	Debut film
2001	El segundo aire	Ricardo	
2012	Morelos	Nicolás Bravo	
2013	Tercera llamada	Daniel	
2014	La dictadura perfecta	Rafael Lascurain	

=== Television ===
Year	Title	Role	Notes
1992	El abuelo y yo	Perico	
1992	Ángeles sin paraíso	Chato	
1995	Si Dios me quita la vida		
1996	Tú y yo	Humberto	
1997	Mi generación		
1998	Rencor apasionado	Tony Mendiola	
1998	Preciosa	Robin	
1998	El zep de Disney	Jorge	
1999	El diario de Daniela	Carlos	
1999	Por tu amor	David Parra	
2000	Por un beso	Agustín Águilar	
2001	Atrévete a olvidarme	El Gato	
2001–2002	El manantial	Héctor Luna	
2002–2003	Clase 406	Francisco Romero	
2003–2004	Velo de novia	Rafael Sosa / Ernesto Sosa	
2004–2005	Mujer de madera	Rogelio Rebollar	
2005	Contra viento y marea	Mateo Lizárraga	
2006-2007	Hoy	Host	2 episodes
2007	Sexo y otros secretos	Conductor de Hoy	"La fiesta" (Season 1, Episode 11)
2008–2009	Alma de hierro	Sebastián Hierro Jiménez	
2010	Mujeres asesinas	Pablo	"Elena, protectora" (Season 3, Episode 2)
2011	Rafaela	José María Baez	Lead role
2012	Cachito de cielo	Fabio Montenegro	
2014	La Gata	Mariano Martínez Negrete	Supporting Role; 112 episodes
2016	El hotel de los secretos	Diego Montejo / Juan Camilo Angarita	
2017	El vuelo de la victoria	Julio Montano	
2019	Ringo	Diego Jáuregui	
2019	Por amar sin ley	Fabián Torres	Season 2
2020–2022	Oscuro deseo	Leonardo Solares	
2023	Gloria Trevi: Ellas soy yo	César Santiago	
2024	El precio de amarte	Iván Franco	

== Awards and nominations ==
=== TVyNovelas Awards ===
Year	Category'	Nominated works	Result
2002	Best Co-star Actor	El manantial	Won
2007	Best Presenter	Hoy	Nominated
2009	Best Co-star Actor	Alma de Hierro	Won

=== Premios Diosas de Plata ===
Year	Category'	Nominated works	Result
2001	Best Male Co-Acting	El segundo aire	Nominated
