= El juego de la vida =

Television series

- Genre: Telenovela
- Written by: Katia R. Estrada; Graciela Gómez; Enna Márquez
- Directed by: Claudio Reyes Rubio; Eric Morales Mendoza
- Starring: Valentino Lanús; Ana Layevska; Margarita Magaña; Sara Maldonado; Jackie García
- Theme music composer: Carlos Páramo
- Opening theme: "El juego de la vida" by Twister
- Country of origin: Mexico
- Original language: Spanish
- No. of episodes: 165

Production
- Executive producer: Roberto Gómez Fernández
- Producer: Giselle González Salgado
- Production locations: Televisa San Ángel; Mexico City, Mexico; Acapulco, Guerrero; Cuernavaca, Morelos; El Ajusco, Mexico City, D.F.; Mexico City, D.F.; Toluca, State of Mexico; Tokyo, Japan
- Cinematography: Héctor Márquez; Armando Zafra
- Editors: Alejandro Becerril; Juan Alfredo Villareal
- Camera setup: Multi-camera
- Running time: 41–44 minutes
- Production company: Televisa

Original release
- Network: Canal de las Estrellas
- Release: November 12, 2001 – June 28, 2002

El juego de la vida (English: The game of life) is a Mexican telenovela produced by Roberto Gómez Fernández and Giselle González Salgado for Televisa. It premiered on November 12, 2001 and ended on June 28, 2002.

Sara Maldonado and Valentino Lanús star as protagonists; Ana Layevska, Margarita Magaña, Ingrid Martz, and Jackie García star as co-protagonists, while Raquel Pankowsky, Cristián Seri, Rodrigo Mejía, Maki Soler, and Raúl Araiza starred as antagonists. The series was also the first Mexican telenovela to air over-the-air in Japan, with a dubbed airing on the Kyoto Broadcasting System in Kyoto Prefecture in 2004.

== Plot ==
Lorena, the more focused of the group, is a cute girl with a good heart. When she returns to school, Lorena's longtime boyfriend, Mariano, leaves her after he confesses that he loves her supposed best friend Tania.

Lorena runs home crying, and when she crosses the street, she clashes with Juan Carlos Domínguez, who falls in love with her at first sight.

Paulina, is a beautiful, sweet girl with a good heart, but also suffers from the death of her mother, who is actually alive, but her father and her aunt make her believe she died. Paulina's father shows little interest in her.

Fernanda is a wild shrinking girl who does not believe in love and can't control her nerves sometimes.

Daniela is a young innocent girl who gets her heart broken by her boyfriend Tono who suffers from a car accident and goes blind. Tono doesn’t want Daniela to spend her life suffering and looking out for him so he ends up breaking up with her.

== Cast ==
- Valentino Lanús as Juan Carlos "Juan Charlie" Domínguez
- Sara Maldonado as Lorena "Lore" Álvarez
- Ana Layevska as Paulina "Pau" de la Mora Miraban
- Margarita Magaña as Fernanda "Fer" Pacheco
- Jackie García as Daniela "Dany" Duarte
- Luis Gimeno as Nicolás "Don Nico" Domínguez "Abuelo"
- Manuel "Flaco" Ibáñez as Augusto Vidal
- Silvia Mariscal as Sara Domínguez "Doña Sara"
- Lucero Lander as Lucía Álvarez
- Ingrid Martz as Georgina "Gina" Rivero Fuentes Guerra
- Miguel Ángel Biaggio as Antonio "Toño" Pacheco
- Maki Soler as Tania Vidal
- Mauricio Barcelata as Mariano Alarcón
- Patricio Borghetti as Patricio "Pato"
- Tina Romero as Mercedes "Meche" Pacheco
- David Ostrosky as Rafael Duarte
- Juan Carlos Colombo as Ignacio de la Mora
- Raquel Morell as Consuelo Duarte
- Rafael Amador as Genaro Pacheco
- Mariana Karr as Victoria "Vicky" Vidal
- Ofelia Cano as Eugenia Robles
- Raquel Pankowsky as Bertha de la Mora
- Héctor Sáez as Braulio Zúñiga
- Otto Sirgo as Javier Álvarez
- Gabriela Cano as Araceli "Ñoña" Fuentes
- Sergio Ochoa as Carmelo "Carmelito" Sánchez
- Luciano Seri as Diego Santillán
- Alexandra Monterrubio as Cinthia "Cin" Linares
- Cristián Seri as Oscar Santillán
- Juan Carlos Martín del Campo as Andrés Miranda
- Raul Araiza as Ezequiel Domínguez
- María Fernanda Malo as Marisol Duarte
- Ilan Arditti as Adrián
- Diana Osorio as Carmen "Carmelita" Pérez
- Rodrigo Mejía as Fabián
- Miguel Ángel Santa Rita as Simón Robles
- Graciela Bernardos as Camila de la Mora
- Jorge Veytia as Artemio / "Chemo"
- Ivonne Montero as Carola Lizardi #1
- Yessica Salazar as Carola Lizardi #2
- Fátima Torre as Fátima Álvarez
- Diego Sieres as Alberto "Beto" Duarte
- Polly as Leticia Guzmán
- Paola Flores as Pachis
- Ricardo Vera as Bernal
- Adalberto Parra as El Risueño
- Carlos Amador as Santos
- Fernando Moya as Manuel
- Horacio Castelo as Mancera
- Joshua Tacher as Roque"
- Miguel Garza as Luis
- Ingrid Macossay - as Gladys
