= Natalia Esperón =

Mexican actress

- Born: Natalia del Carmen Esperón Alcocer; November 14, 1974 (age 51); Mexico City, Mexico
- Other names: Natalie
- Occupations: Actress, model
- Years active: 1994-2013; 2022-present
- Spouse: José Bastón (m. 1995; div. 2005)
- Children: 4

Natalia Esperón (born Natalia del Carmen Esperón Alcocer; November 14, 1974) is a Mexican actress and former model.

== Personal life ==
In 1995, Esperón married José Bastón; the next year she gave birth to daughter Natalia. In 2003 she gave birth to triplets: daughter Mariana and sons José Antonio and Sebastián. Sebastián died a few days after birth. In 2005, Esperón divorced Bastón.

== Filmography ==
Year	Title	Role	Notes
1994-95	Agujetas de color de rosa	Paola Armendares	Main role
1996	La Antorche Encendida	María de la Luz de la Fuente	Main cast
1997	No tengo madre	Abril Vasconcelos	Main role
1998	Rencor apasionado	Karina Rangel Rivera/Leonora Luján	Main role
1999	El niño que vino del mar	Nisa Rodríguez Cáceres de Rivera	Main role
2000-01	Por un beso	Blanca Garza de Otero Robles/Azucena Otero Robles Garza de Díaz de León	Main role
2005	La esposa virgen	Blanca de la Fuente de Cruz	Main cast
2006	Espérame en otro mundo	Marcela	Film
2007	13 Miedos	Luisa	TV-Series
2008	Los Simuladores		1 Episode
2008	Mujeres Asesinas	Claudia Azuela	Episode: "Claudia, cuchillera"
2008	Cómo no te voy a querer	Grisel	Film
2009	En nombre del amor	Luz Laguillo	Guest role
2012-13	Amores Verdaderos	Adriana Balvanera Gil	Main cast
2022	Corazón guerrero	Guadalupe García	Main cast
2023	Tierra de esperanza	Norma Jurado	Main cast
2024	El ángel de Aurora	Aurora Campero	Main role

== Awards and nominations ==
=== TVyNovelas Awards ===
Year	Category	Telenovela	Result
1995	Best Female Revelation	Agujetas de color de rosa	Won
2006	Best Co-star Actress	La esposa virgen	Nominated
2014	Best Co-star Actress	Amores Verdaderos	Nominated

=== Premios El Heraldo de México ===
Year	Category	Telenovela	Result
1995	Best Revelation on Television	Agujetas de color de rosa	Won

=== Diosas de Plata ===
Year	Category	Film	Result
2009	Female Revelation	Espérame en otro mundo	Nominated
