= Agujetas de color de rosa =

Mexican telenovela

- Genre: Telenovela; Romance; Drama
- Written by: Susan Crowley; Gabriela Ortigoza
- Directed by: Otto Sirgo
- Starring: Angélica María; Alberto Vázquez; Natalia Esperón; Flavio César
- Opening theme: Agujetas de color de rosa by Curvas Peligrosas; Mi chico prohibido by Curvas Peligrosas
- Ending theme: La vida es rosa by Irán Castillo
- Country of origin: Mexico
- Original language: Spanish
- No. of episodes: 300

Production
- Executive producer: Luis de Llano Macedo
- Running time: 41-44 minutes
- Production company: Televisa

Original release
- Network: Canal de las Estrellas
- Release: April 4, 1994 – May 26, 1995

Related
- Buscando el paraíso; Morelia

Agujetas de color de rosa (English title: Pink Shoe Laces) is a Mexican telenovela produced by Luis de Llano Macedo for Televisa in 1994.

It stars Angélica María, Alberto Vázquez, Natalia Esperón and Flavio César.

== Plot ==
Elisa has just been widowed from her deceased husband, Esteban, leaving her to raise her 3 children: Paola, Daniel and Anita. However, Esteban's mother, Elvira, wants to steal his inheritance and hires Julian Ledesma, a vile and ambitious lawyer in love with Paola, to steal it. However, Paola wants nothing to do with Julian and wants to be a skater, since the ice rink inspires her.

Gonzalo is shown as a good man, but his wife leaves him while leaving both of their children to the husband, named Martín and Luisito. This event causes Gonzalo to put in all his effort to prevent his family from falling apart. Martín dreams of being a singer in the future and signing a contact with a record company.

One day, Elisa collides with Gonzalo and despite the mishap, begins a beautiful friendship that eventually turns to marriage. When Paola and Martín meet each other, there is a hatred between them that later becomes love, despite the interest that Martín feels towards Paola's friend, Vanessa Del Moral, the daughter of the rink owner of the skating rink Paola frequents and works as a waitress.

Noticing the interest that Martin and Paola have, and after learning Paola is involved with a skating team at the rink, Vanessa becomes a rival to Paola and tries to destroy their relationship by registering with the team in order to compete against her old friend. At one point, Paola and Vanessa are paired on a team to compete against another team in a competition. During the event, when Vanessa and Paola are the ones skating, Vanessa causes Paola to suffer a serious accident by throwing her against the rink windows. The entire public - especially Julián Ledezma, and Paola's family - are shocked by what transpired as Paola is immediately hospitalized. Despite a grim prognosis from the doctors, Paola starts walking again after surgery. Meanwhile, Vanessa goes on tour with Martin. However, due to constant jealousy, Martin asks Vanessa to leave.

Not long after, Vanessa begins to show symptoms of an illness that worries her mother, and after close examination, learns she is terminally cancer-stricken, giving her only a short time to live. Heartbroken, Vanessa's mother tells Martin about her condition, and asks him to marry his daughter to make Vanessa happy before she passes. Martín is hesitant to accept, but when Vanessa faints before him and Paola, he accepts and visits Vanessa to ask her hand in marriage, to which Vanessa accepts.

The marriage plans are eventually made public, and Paola cannot help feeling bad about the situation, but she accepts it willingly. On the day of the wedding, Vanessa collapses before the ceremony could begin. The bride is moved to her home, where all the guests are waiting. After talking to Paola, Vanessa dies.

Paola and Martín resume their relationship, but Martin's conflicts with his manager get bigger, and the young man decides to confront him, resulting in Martín being unfairly incarcerated. Desperate, Paola requests Julian Ledesma's help, who agrees to take Martin out of jail in exchange for Paola marrying Julian. Paola reluctantly agrees, Martin is released, and his former manager is arrested. However, when Martin looks for her and finds that she married Julian, he is advised by his father to forget about her. Martin later goes on tour abroad with his group, thinking he has nothing left to stop him. However, when Gonzalo decides to visit Martin, he is killed in a plane crash, thus leaving Elisa widowed once more.

The marriage between Julian and Paola faces some problems, and while more obstacles emerge for Paola and her family, happiness ends up triumphing.

== Cast ==
- Angélica María as Elisa Morán Vda. de Armendares
- Alberto Vázquez as Gonzalo Dávila
- Carlos Bracho as Jorge Bosch
- Angélica Aragón as Bertha
- Julissa as Lola
- Pedro Armendáriz, Jr. as Aarón Zamora
- Natalia Esperón as Paola Armendares
- Flavio César as Martín Dávila
- Alexis Ayala as Julián Ledezma
- Gabriela Hassel as Vanessa del Moral
- María Teresa Rivas as Doña Elvira Armendares
- César Évora as Esteban Armendares
- Liliana Weimer as Patricia Dávila
- David Ostrosky as Víctor Manuel Medina
- Eduardo Liñán as Alonso del Moral
- Pedro Weber "Chatanuga" as Nicolás Dávila
- Anel as Rebeca del Moral
- José María Torre as Daniel Armendares
- Marisol Centeno as Anita Armendares
- Felipe Colombo as Luisito Dávila
- Irán Castillo as Cecilia Zamora
- Ofelia Guilmáin as Bárbara
- Enrique Guzmán as César
- Roxana Chávez as Irma Zamora
- Eulalio González "Piporro" as Antonio Rozas
- Humberto Elizondo as Tomás
- Oscar Servin as Bruno
- Monserrat Ontiveros as Avelina "Lina" Gómez Calderón
- Diego Schoening as Tavo
- Sergio de Bustamante as Gino
- Marisol Mijares as Renata Zamora
- Alan Gutiérrez as Jerónimo
- Sergio Blass as Cristián
- Nora Salinas as Jessica
- Charlie as Félix
- Francesca Guillén as Deborah/Fernanda Gómez Calderón
- Silvia Campos as Marcela
- Karla Álvarez as Isabel
- Ariane Pellicer as Lara Lai
- Shanti Clasing as Marisol
- Sherlyn as Clarita
- Alejandra Peniche as Gloria Gómez Calderón
- Sergio Acosta as Ismael Pérez
- Eduardo Arroyuelo as Rubén
- Alejandro Ibarra as Aldo
- Sergio Ochoa as Fernando
- Adriana Acosta as Adriana
- Kelly as Kelly
- Sheyla Tadeo as Sheyla
- Edith Márquez as Edith del Castillo
- Leonardo Daniel as Miguel Davis
- Isaac Edid as Rafa
- Regina Torné as Mercedes Bosch
- Alfredo Alegría as Lenguardo
- Eugenio Bartilotti as Silver
- Diego Sieres as Memo
- Lourdes Reyes as Laura
- Manuel Landeta as Arnold
- Giorgio Palacios as del Prado
- Claudia Vega as Dínorah
- Luis Gimeno as Lucio
- José Carlos Ruiz as Odilón
- Jorge Russek as Pompeyo
- Patricio Castillo as Serafín
- Manuel Gurría as Coque
- Sandra Olivares as Lorena
- Vaitiare Bandera as Vilma Montemayor
- Raúl Meraz as Julián's father
- Juan Carlos Colombo as Dr. Belazcuarán
- Martha Aguayo as herself
- Saúl Lisazo as Martín's lawyer
- Fernando Borges as Chauffeur
- Cecilia Toussaint
- Irlanda Mora
- Arleth Terán
- Anna Silvetti
- Eduardo Schillinsky
- Yadira Santana
- Marcela Pezet
- Guillermo Murray
- Lourdes Munguía
- Miguel Pizarro
- Toño Infante
- Charo
- Laureano Brizuela
- Jacqueline Voltaire
- Héctor Sandarti
- Zoila Quiñones
- Shanik Berman

== Soundtrack ==
Disc 1: Agujetas de color de rosa

- "Agujetas de color de rosa" – Curvas Peligrosas (Main theme)
- "Inolvidable" – Flavio César
- "En tus manos" – Angélica María
- "Mi oración" – Alberto Vázquez
- "La vida es rosa" – Irán Castillo
- "Al filo de lo prohibido" – Alan Gutiérrez
- "Tengo tantos novios" – Marisol Mijares
- "Amigo de bolsillo" – Marisol Centeno
- "Me tienes que prometer" – Gabriela Torrero
- "Superprendido" – Chicos del Boulevard
- "Siempre estarás en mí" – Irán Castillo & José María Torre
- "Cruce de sonrisas" – José María Torre

Disc 2: Más agujetas de color de rosa

- "Mi chico prohibido" – Curvas Peligrosas
- "Mi novio volvió" – Irán Castillo
- "Voy, voy, voy" – Onda Vaselina
- "Cuchi fever" – Charo
- "Energía" – Microchips
- "Corazón" – Stephanie Salas
- "Tatuaje" – Gabriela Torrero
- "Vueltas" – Sentido Contrario
- "Superstar" – Marisol Centeno
- "Somos la luz del mañana" – Sergio Blass
- "Oyendo tu voz" – Microchips
- "Qué tienen tus besos" – Angélica María
- "Agujetas de color de rosa (Bacalao Mix)" – Curvas Peligrosas

== Awards and nominations ==
Year	Award	Category	Nominee	Result
1995	13th TVyNovelas Awards	Best Telenovela	Luis de Llano Macedo	Nominated
1995	13th TVyNovelas Awards	Best Teen Telenovela	Luis de Llano Macedo	Won
1995	13th TVyNovelas Awards	Best Actress	Angélica María	Nominated
1995	13th TVyNovelas Awards	Best Leading Actress	María Teresa Rivas	Nominated
1995	13th TVyNovelas Awards	Best Leading Actor	Alberto Vázquez	Nominated
1995	13th TVyNovelas Awards	Best Co-lead Actor	Pedro Weber "Chatanuga"	Won
1995	13th TVyNovelas Awards	Best Young Lead Actress	Gabriela Hassel	Nominated
1995	13th TVyNovelas Awards	Best Young Lead Actor	Alexis Ayala	Nominated
1995	13th TVyNovelas Awards	Best Female Revelation	Irán Castillo	Nominated
1995	13th TVyNovelas Awards	Best Female Revelation	Natalia Esperón	Won
1995	13th TVyNovelas Awards	Best Male Revelation	Flavio César	Won
1995	13th TVyNovelas Awards	Best Male Revelation	José María Torre	Nominated
1995	13th TVyNovelas Awards	Best Child Performance	Felipe Colombo	Nominated
1995	13th TVyNovelas Awards	Best Child Performance	Marisol Centeno	Won
1995	El Heraldo de México Awards	Best Telenovela	Luis de Llano Macedo	Nominated
1995	El Heraldo de México Awards	Best Actress	Angélica María	Nominated
1995	El Heraldo de México Awards	Best Revelation	Flavio César	Nominated
1995	El Heraldo de México Awards	Best Revelation	Irán Castillo	Nominated
1995	El Heraldo de México Awards	Best Revelation	Natalia Esperón	Won
1995	Eres Awards	Best Telenovela	Luis de Llano Macedo	Won
1995	Eres Awards	Television Debut	Natalia Esperón	Won
1995	Latin ACE Awards	Female Revelation	Roxana Chávez	Won
