= Artesanos =

- Directed by: Albert Albacete
- Screenplay by: Albert Albacete
- Produced by: ECIB
- Cinematography: Pau Mirabet
- Edited by: Ogadenia Sanchez
- Release date: 2011
- Running time: 20 minutes
- Country: Spain

Artesanos is a 2011 Spanish documentary film. It was selected by African Film Festival of Cordoba - FCAT.

== Synopsis ==
The craftsmen in the Marrakesh medina speak of the loss of values and the disappearance of the traditional way of life, while tourists stroll by unaware of their reality. Products "made in China" and the ever-increasing presence of plastic products does not allow them to earn enough to live off their crafts.
