= Xavier Ortiz =

Mexican actor and singer (died 2020)

Xavier Ortiz Ramírez (June 29, 1962 or 1972 – September 7, 2020) was a Mexican actor, singer, model, producer, TV host, dentist/surgeon and entrepreneur and owner of bar-restaurant La Santa Bar in Guadalajara, Mexico. A former member of the 8-piece musical group Garibaldi, on April 17, 1999, he married another former member of the group Garibaldi, Patricia Manterola. Their relationship lasted 15 years, including 10 years as a couple and 5 years as husband and wife.

With Garibaldi he filmed Dónde quedó la bolita and after he left the band made three telenovelas with Televisa. He was part of the cast of the film Journey from the Fall (2006) and the Mexican production of P.S. Your Cat Is Dead.

== Films ==
- Peligrosa tentacion (2008) as Carlo
- Journey from the Fall (2005) as Bully
- Las pasiones de sor juana (2004) as Antonio Mancera
- Dónde quedó la bolita (1993) (as a member of Garibaldi)

== Telenovelas ==
- La rosa de Guadalupe 'Papito Querido' (2010)
- Un gancho al corazón (2009) as Lalo
- Tormenta en el paraiso (2007) as Emilio
- Duelo de pasiones (2006) as Rodrigo Ochoa
- Te amaré en silencio (2003) as Federico
- Por tu amor (1999) as Pablo
- Camila (1998) as Rodrigo Sandoval
- Sentimientos ajenos (1996) as Humberto

== Programs ==
- "La Riera" .... Francesc (1 episode, 2010)

- Episode #1.83 (2010) TV episode (as Xavi Ortiz) .... Francesc

- "Adictos" (1 episode, 2009)

- Drogas (2009) TV episode

- "Un gancho al corazón" .... Lalo Mora (1 episode, 2008)

- Una oportunidad (2008) TV episode .... Lalo Mora

- "In Plain Sight" .... Male Singer (1 episode, 2008)

- Don of the Dead (2008) TV episode .... Male Singer

- Che: Part One (2008) .... Felipe Pazos

... a.k.a. "The Argentine" - International (English title) (alternative title), USA (working title)

- Peligrosa tentación (2008) (V)
- "Vecinos" .... Alejandro / ... (2 episodes, 2006–2008)

- Enchúlame mi auto (2008) TV episode .... Alejandro
- Buscando al portero (2006) TV episode .... Jimmy

- "Tormenta en el paraíso" .... Emilio (1 episode, 2007)

- Episode #1.1 (2007) TV episode .... Emilio

- "Duelo de pasiones" .... Rodrigo (1 episode, 2006)

- Duelo de pasiones (2006) TV episode .... Rodrigo

- Journey from the Fall (2006) .... Bully
- "La fea más bella" .... Bugambilia (1 episode, 2006)

... a.k.a. "The Prettiest Ugly Girl" - International (English title)
- La fea más bella (2006) TV episode .... Bugambilia

- Más que hermanos (2005) (TV) (as Xavi Ortiz) .... Padre hospital
- "Hospital Central" (1 episode, 2004)

- Suma de vectores (2004) TV episode

- Las pasiones de sor Juana (2004) .... Antonio Mancera
- "Te amaré en silencio" (2003) TV series .... Federico
- Amb el 10 a l'esquena (2003) (TV) (as Xavi Ortiz) .... Vecino Gradas
- "Por tu amor" .... Pablo (1 episode, 1999)

- Por tu amor (1999) TV episode .... Pablo

- "Camila" (1998) TV series (as Xavier Ortiz) .... Rodrigo Sandoval
- "Sentimientos ajenos" (1996) TV series .... Humberto
- Dónde quedó la bolita (1993) (as Garibaldi)

Self :

- "Historias engarzadas" .... Himself (1 episode, 2007)

- Adriana Barraza I (2007) TV episode .... Himself

- "Big Brother VIP: México" .... Himself (1 episode, 2005)

- Supermiércoles de Dominó (2005) TV episode .... Himself

- "¡Despierta América!" .... Himself (1 episode, 2004)

== Theater ==
- Aventurera (2004-2020) as Bugambilia
- Table dance (2009) produced by himself
- Sólo para Mujeres (2005) as himself and was given the name "dios griego" by the fans
- P.D. Tu gato ha muerto ("P.S. Your Cat Is Dead")
- programs

== Death ==
Ortiz died on September 7, 2020, in Guadalajara. According to his sister, Olga Ortiz Ramirez, he committed suicide by hanging as he was depressed by the COVID-19 pandemic situation, a recent separation from his wife, and a number of other reasons.
