= La esposa virgen =

Television series

- Genre: Telenovela; Romance; Drama
- Created by: Liliana Abud
- Based on: Tormenta de pasiones by Caridad Bravo Adams
- Developed by: Julián Aguilar; Mauricio Aridjis
- Written by: Dolores Ortega; Juan Carlos Tejeda
- Screenplay by: Jorge Lozano Soriano
- Directed by: Miguel Córcega; Jorge Édgar Ramírez; Alberto Díaz
- Starring: Adela Noriega; Jorge Salinas; Natalia Esperón; Sergio Sendel; Arleth Terán; Lilia Aragón
- Opening theme: "Qué voy a hacer con mi amor" by Alejandro Fernández
- Country of origin: Mexico
- Original language: Spanish
- No. of episodes: 65

Production
- Executive producer: Salvador Mejía Alejandre
- Production locations: Filming; Televisa San Ángel; Mexico City, Mexico; Locations; San Francisco de los Arenales, Mexico
- Cinematography: Jesús Acuña Lee; Jesús Nájera Saro
- Editors: Marco Antonio Rocha; Pablo Peralta; Alfredo Frutos Maza
- Camera setup: Multi-camera
- Running time: 41-44 minutes
- Production company: Televisa

Original release
- Network: Canal de las Estrellas
- Release: July 18 – October 21, 2005

Related
- Tormenta de pasiones (1965)

La esposa virgen (English: The Virgin Wife) is a Mexican telenovela produced by Salvador Mejía Alejandre for Televisa in 2005. The story is based on the radionovela Tormenta de pasiones by Caridad Bravo Adams.

On Monday, July 18, 2005, Canal de las Estrellas started broadcasting La esposa virgen weekdays at 9:00pm, replacing La madrastra. The last episode was broadcast on Friday, October 21, 2005 with Alborada replacing it on Monday, October 24, 2005.

Adela Noriega, Jorge Salinas, Natalia Esperón, Sergio Sendel, Arleth Terán and Lilia Aragón starred in this telenovela.

== Plot ==
Shortly before his death, General Francisco Ortiz (Ignacio López Tarso) marries Virginia (Adela Noriega) and names her his sole heir.

When Virginia and her younger brother, Diego (Sebastián), arrive in the town of San Francisco de los Arenales to bury the general, they are accompanied by the latter's nephew, Captain Fernando Ortiz (Sergio Sendel), who despises Virginia, believing her to be a gold-digger who married his uncle for his fortune.

The only person who welcomes Virginia in town is the mayor, Dr. José Guadalupe Cruz (Jorge Salinas), an honest man whose wife, Blanca (Natalia Esperón), is suffering from a terminal illness.

Virginia is surprised to see the general's ranch abandoned, unaware that this is a doing of Fernando's mother, Aurelia (Lilia Aragón), who has allied herself with the manager, Cristóbal (Roberto Ballesteros), to rob Virginia of the fortune she has inherited.

Aurelia hates Virginia and will do everything possible to get her to leave the ranch, knowing that if she does, she will lose her inheritance. But if she doesn't leave, Aurelia is prepared to resort to violence. Her hatred grows even stronger when she realizes that Fernando has fallen madly in love with Virginia, although she sees him only as a good friend.

When Virginia meets Blanca, a sincere friendship develops between them. José Guadalupe is unaware that Blanca knows about his infidelity with a selfish and ambitious woman named Olga (Arleth Terán). Knowing that she has little time left to live, Blanca fears for the happiness of her husband and their daughter, Marisol (Kendra), if he were to marry Olga.

Unintentionally, a passionate love develops between Virginia and José Guadalupe. They both refuse to accept it and treat each other with hostility, knowing that giving in to that love would betray Blanca's trust.

After a marriage that was never consummated, Virginia will now have to fight against the hatred and ambition of Aurelia and Cristóbal, while trying to stop her forbidden love for José Guadalupe.

== Cast ==
=== Main ===
- Adela Noriega as Virginia Alfaro
- Jorge Salinas as José Guadalupe Cruz
- Natalia Esperón as Blanca de la Fuente
- Sergio Sendel as Fernando Ortiz
- Arleth Terán as Olga Barquín
- Lilia Aragón as Aurelia Betancourt

=== Also main ===
- Delia Casanova as Clemencia
- Alejandro Ruiz as Loreto
- Roberto Ballesteros as Cristóbal
- Luis Bayardo as Valdés

=== Recurring ===
- Arlette Pacheco as Soledad
- Eugenio Cobo as Father Matías
- Juan Ignacio Aranda as Dante
- Eduardo Noriega as Notary
- Sebastián as Diego
- Kendra as Marisol
- Alberto Salaberry as Fabián
- Daniel Gauvry as Paulino
- Antonio Brenán as Gael
- Jorge Brenán as Gabriel
- Fátima Torre as Olivia
- Itzamna Sodi as Patricio
- Odemaris Ruiz as Susana
- Rubén Morales as Efrén
- José Antonio Ferral as Tomás
- Mirtha Reneé as Amalia
- Rocío Valenti as Margarita
- Claudia Ortega as Angelina
- Benjamín Rivero as Efraín
- Ignacio López Tarso as General Francisco Ortiz
- Óscar Traven as Rolando
- Lourdes Munguía as Aída
- Luis Uribe as Dr. Garza
- Alma Muriel as Mercedes
- Hilda Aguirre as Raquela
- Bárbara Gómez as Sorceress
- Martha Ofelia Galindo as Matiana
- Carlos Cámara Jr. as Arturo
- César Évora as Loco Serenata

=== Guest star ===
- Otto Sirgo as Dr. Mendoza

== Awards and nominations ==
Year	Award	Category	Nominee(s)	Result
2006	24th TVyNovelas Awards	Best Telenovela	Salvador Mejía Alejandre	Nominated
2006	24th TVyNovelas Awards	Best Actress	Adela Noriega	Nominated
2006	24th TVyNovelas Awards	Best Antagonist Actress	Lilia Aragón	Nominated
2006	24th TVyNovelas Awards	Best Leading Actress	Delia Casanova	Won
2006	24th TVyNovelas Awards	Best Leading Actor	Luis Bayardo	Nominated
2006	24th TVyNovelas Awards	Best Supporting Actress	Natalia Esperón	Nominated
2006	24th TVyNovelas Awards	Best Supporting Actor	César Évora	Nominated
2006	24th TVyNovelas Awards	Best Child Performance	Sebastián	Nominated
2006	15th Bravo Awards	Best Child Actor	Sebastián	Won
