= Camila (TV series) =

- Genre: Telenovela; Romance; Drama
- Created by: Inés Rodena
- Written by: Gabriela Ortigoza; Ricardo Tejeda; Juan Carlos Tejeda; Juan Carlos Alcalá; Carmen Sepúlveda
- Directed by: Marta Luna; Luis Eduardo Reyes; Álvaro Carcaño; Lily Garza
- Starring: Bibi Gaytán; Eduardo Capetillo; Adamari López; Enrique Lizalde; Gabriela Goldsmith
- Opening theme: Camila by Eduardo Capetillo
- Composer: Amparo Rubín
- Country of origin: Mexico
- Original language: Spanish
- No. of episodes: 90

Production
- Executive producer: Angelli Nesma Medina
- Producer: María de Jesús Arellano
- Production locations: Filming; Televisa San Ángel; Mexico City, Mexico; Locations; Tzurumutaro, Michoacán, Mexico
- Cinematography: Gilberto Macín; Alberto Rodríguez; Roberto Zamora Soldevilla
- Camera setup: Multi-camera
- Running time: 41–44 minutes
- Production company: Televisa

Original release
- Network: Canal de las Estrellas
- Release: September 14, 1998 – January 15, 1999

Related
- Viviana (1978-1979)

Camila is a Mexican telenovela produced by Angelli Nesma Medina for Televisa in 1998. The story is a remake of 1978 Mexican telenovela Viviana. It aired on Canal de Las Estrellas from September 14, 1998 to January 15, 1999.

Bibi Gaytán and Eduardo Capetillo starred as protagonists, while Adamari López, Kuno Becker, Diana Golden, Arlette Pacheco, Julio Mannino, Lourdes Reyes, Xavier Ortiz and Mariagna Prats starred as the main antagonists. Gabriela Goldsmith, Víctor Noriega and Enrique Lizalde starred as the Stellar performances.

== Plot ==
Camila Flores (Gaytán) lives with her grandfather in a small village. She meets Mexico City attorney, Miguel Gutierrez (Capetillo), and they quickly fall in love and are married in a civil ceremony. Their church wedding is planned to be a few weeks later, but it never takes place.

Miguel abandons his new wife to marry Mónica Iturralde (López), the spoiled daughter of powerful lawyer Don Armando Iturralde (Lizalde). Racked by guilt in a loveless (and bigamous) marriage, Miguel is torn between his love for Camila and his fear of returning to the poverty that he has spent so much energy escaping.

Meanwhile, Camila finds out she is pregnant and resolves to raise her child by herself and to never forgive her husband. Mónica rapidly becomes disillusioned with her marriage, and she falls in love with Julio (Kuno Becker), the son of the owners of a local beauty salon and gym.

The gym is one of the main locations where the action takes place, as Camila is employed there before her pregnancy becomes noticeable. Ada (Dinorah Cavazos) is soon a good friend of Camila's, while Selene (Lourdes Reyes) sees Camila as a rival for Julio's affection.

Rodrigo (Xavier Ortiz) has his advances rejected by Camila and helps Selene frame her for a theft. The Iturralde Law Firm is also central to the action, as is Don Armando's home, where his wife Ana María (Gabriela Goldsmith) fights a long-term illness.

== Cast ==
- Bibi Gaytán as Camila Flores
- Eduardo Capetillo as Miguel Gutiérrez
- Adamari López as Mónica Iturralde
- Enrique Lizalde as Armando Iturralde
- Gabriela Goldsmith as Ana María de Iturralde
- Kuno Becker as Julio Galindo
- Patricia Martínez as Rosario "Chayo" Juárez
- Lourdes Reyes as Selene Olivares
- Abraham Ramos as Pablo Juárez
- Yuvia Charlin as Beatriz Molina
- Arlette Pacheco as Iris Molina
- Julio Mannino as Nacho Juárez
- Rebeca Mankita as Natalia Galindo
- Daniel Gaurvy as Hernán Galindo
- Margarita Magaña as Laura Escobar
- Raúl Magaña as Iván Almeida
- Raquel Pankowsky as Gloria
- Mariagna Prats as Teresa Zúñiga
- Maleni Morales as Mercedes Escobar
- Víctor Noriega as Dr. Robin Wicks
- Vanessa Guzmán as Fabiola
- Gerardo Murguía as Andrade
- Polly as Julieta
- Francesca Guillén as Cecilia
- Diana Golden as Silvia Escalante
- Enrique Becker as Artemio
- Hector Cruz as Fausto
- Ignacio López Tarso as Don Genaro
- Martha Navarro as Digna
- Evelyn Solares as Adela
- Sussan Taunton as Renata
- Mike Salas as Mike
- Giovan D'Angelo as Lorenzo Alarcón
- Dinorah Cavazos as Ada Obrera
- José Luis Montemayor as Rafael Buendía
- Ricardo Carrión as Lucio
- Xavier Ortiz as Rodrigo Sandoval
- Rafael Inclán as Luis Lavalle
- Lisette Morelos as Ingrid Valverde
- Ismael Larrumbe as Agent Robledo
- Myrrah Saavedra as Mrs. Urquidi
- Gustavo Negrete as Doctor
- Luis Uribe as Nicandro
- Indra Zuno as Elisa
- Humberto Elizondo as Lic. Darío Suárez
- Manuel Guizar as Dr. Fuentes
