= LGBTQ culture in Mexico =

LGBTQ pride flag of Mexico

In Mexican culture, it is now relatively common to see gay characters represented on Mexican sitcoms and soap operas (telenovelas) and being discussed on talk shows. However, representations of male homosexuals vary widely. They often include stereotypical versions of male effeminacy meant to provide comic relief as well as representations meant to increase social awareness and generate greater acceptance of homosexuality. However, efforts to represent lesbians have remained nearly non-existent, which might be related to the more general invisibility of lesbian subcultures in Mexico.

Until the prominence of such openly gay luminaries as singer-songwriter Juan Gabriel, artist Juan Soriano, and essayist Carlos Monsiváis, gay life was safely closeted and officially unmentionable in the mass media. A Lesbian-Gay Cultural Week has been held annually since 1982 in Mexico City with the support of a cultural museum belonging to the prestigious National Autonomous University of Mexico (UNAM) since 1987.

== Cinema ==
Exaggeratedly effeminate men representations date as far back as 1938 in the Mexican film La casa del ogro ("The Ogre's House") and continued to appear solely for comedic relief. An example is the film Fin de la fiesta (1972), in which Doña Beatriz, the mother (played by Sara García), kills her gay son with sticks.

The first sympathetic portrayal of a gay character awaited "El lugar sin límites" ("The Place Without Limits"), a 1978 drama directed by Arturo Ripstein and based on the novel by Chilean José Donoso. Played by Roberto Cobo, the character of La Manuela emerges as a tragic figure who is at once desired and victimized by the typically macho characters in a Mexican village. A few years later, Doña Herlinda y su hijo ("Doña Herlinda and Her Son"; 1984) featured the first same-sex couple in Mexican cinema, who struggled with family pressures to survive.

Films like Danzón (1991), by María Novaro; Miroslava (1993), by Alejandro Pelayo; El callejón de los milagros ("The Alley of Miracles"; 1995), by Jorge Fons; or Y tu mamá también ("And Your Mother, Too"; 2001), by Alfonso Cuarón, incorporate homoerotic subject matter as a secondary matter in their plots or in a hidden way. The 2004 film Temporada de patos ("Season of Ducks") featured a teenage boy who discovers his homosexuality.

Julian Hernandez, an openly gay film director, is known for his contributions to Mexican cinema. Hernandez directed critically acclaimed films Mil nubes de paz cercan el cielo (A Thousand Clouds of Peace; 2003) and El cielo dividido (Broken Sky; 2006) allow viewers to observe relationships through the lens of gay desire. None of the film's characters approached the homosexual stereotypes that appeared in Mexican film for decades.

In early 2006, Mexico's first-ever International Gay Film Festival took place in Mexico City and was attended by more than 5,000 movie-goers. According to its director, Alberto Legorreta, the event was born of a desire "to create spaces for dialogue, contemplation, and artistic criticism of gay subject matter in Mexico."

Recent films with LGBTQ themes include La otra familia, Four Moons, I Promise You Anarchy, The Untamed, Do it Like an Hombre, I Dream in Another Language, This is Not Berlin, Dance of the 41 and Háblame de Ti.

== Television ==
Two private channels compete in providing national coverage, Televisa and TV Azteca. Matters of sexuality are presented occasionally, mainly on talk shows and journalistic programs. Mexican networks have a strong self-censoring attitude, and therefore homosexuality is usually not dealt with unless the program deals with HIV/AIDS.

Notwithstanding, in recent years it is now relatively common to include gay characters on Mexican sitcoms and soap operas. A lesbian character was the first to be included in a popular 1990s soap opera, Nada personal ("Nothing Personal"). In this TV Azteca-produced program, the positive image of homosexuality goes along with a major criticism of the Mexican political system.

In 1999, another TV Azteca production, La vida en el espejo ("Life in the Mirror"), showed José María Yazpik playing a gay character, which was recognized by many critics as the first gay character portrayed with dignity in a Mexican soap opera. The same network produced similar gay characters played by actress Margarita Gralia in Mirada de Mujer (1997), actor Juan Pablo Medina in Cuando seas mía ("When You Would Be Mine"; 2001) and actor Juan Manuel Bernal in La heredera ("The Heiress"; 2004). In mid-2009, Televisa-produced soap opera Sortilegio softly dealt with bisexuality.

A couple months later, Los exitosos Pérez ("The Successful Pérezes"), an adaptation of Argentine comedy-drama soap opera Los exitosos Pells ("The Successful Pellses"), was launched in Mexico. The TV show revolves around whether homosexuals should come out of the closet or not. Actor and protagonist Jaime Camil criticized Mexican television for censoring his kissing scenes with male co-star José Ron.

Anthology dramas such as Mujer, Casos de la Vida Real, Como dice el dicho and La rosa de Guadalupe have at various times featured LGBTQ themes in their episodes.

More recently, the soap opera Mi marido tiene familia and its subsequent spin-off El corazón nunca se equivoca successfully featured a gay teen couple which received acclaim from the audiences.

Cable television shows tend to be more open when dealing with LGBTQ issues. Aside from American TV shows, such as sitcom Will & Grace, drama series The L Word, drama series Six Feet Under, reality Queer Eye for the Straight Guy, and several MTV productions, Televisa-affiliated music videos network Telehit has continuously produced TV shows targeting the LGBTQ community since the early 2000s.

Desde Gayola, broadcast from 2001 to 2006, was a Mexican sketch comedy TV series that criticized the reality on the Mexican society, dealing with diverse topics such as politics, religion, sexuality, and show business, among others. Produced by Horacio Villalobos, Desde Gayola featured many LGBTQ characters, including Manigüis (Carlos Rangel), a stereotypical gay male living in the city; Supermana, a transgender superheroine, played by transgender actress Daniel Vives, who deals with women's problems; La Tesorito, played by transgender actress Alejandra Bogue, a parody of TV host and actress Laura León; Pita Amor, played by the actor Miguel Romero, and Mama Mela, played by actor Javier Yepez.

Another prominent Telehit-produced TV show is Guau! ("Cool!"), currently hosted by Alex Kaffie, Lorena Fernández, and Sergio Téllez. Launched in late 2005, Guau! is often considered the only fully gay, Mexican TV show.

Web shows that have been successful on YouTube include the drag reality competition La Más Draga and Con Lugar.

Streaming television Mexican shows featuring LGBTQ themes and/or characters include The House of Flowers, The Club, Monarca, Dark Desire, Control Z, Rebelde, Who Killed Sara? and High Heat.

On June 22, 2023, the first season of the Mexican version of the famous reality show RuPaul's Drag Race, called Drag Race Mexico premiered.

== Literature ==
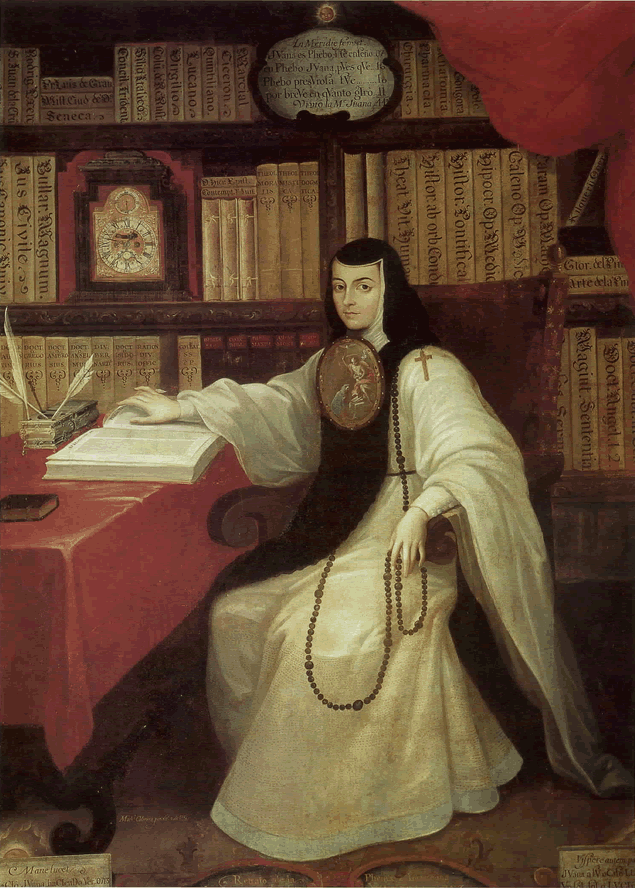
Sor Juana Inés de la Cruz was a Mexican nun presumed by many to be a lesbian and is considered the greatest lyric poet of the colonial period.

The field of literature in Mexico has been particularly propitious to the dissemination of the themes of homosexuality and to the inscriptions of gay and lesbian sensibilities in aesthetic terms. El diario de José Toledo ("José Toledo's Diary"; 1964), written by Miguel Barbachano Ponce, earned recognition as the first novel in Mexico to openly inscribe homosexuality in literature. Rosamaría Roffiel, an openly lesbian self-taught journalist and writer, wrote the book Amora (1989), which is credited with being the first lesbian novel published in Mexico - that is, the first novel that openly discusses lesbianism and places it in the foreground.

Despite societal prejudices, some LGBTQ people were able to live fairly open lives and still become successful, especially in the fields of literature and arts. Sor Juana Inés de la Cruz (1648–1695), considered the greatest lyric poet of the colonial period (1521–1821), was a Mexican nun presumed by many to be a lesbian because of the passionate love poems she addressed to her benefactress Leonor Carreto, wife of Viceroy Antonio Sebastián de Toledo, and her scathing critique of male abuse of power against women.

Salvador Novo (1904–1974) was a poet and member of the avant-garde group Los Contemporáneos, who wrote Nuevo amor ("New Love"; 1933), considered as one of the best collections of poetry ever written in Spanish. His close friend Xavier Villaurrutia (1903–1950), another prominent member of Los Contemporáneos, was a poet and playwright, considered as one of Mexico's finest modern writers and major film and art critics. His Nocturno de los ángeles ("Nocturne of the Angels"; 1936) is one of the monuments of gay writing in Latin America.

Luis Zapata (b. 1951) has become Mexico's most celebrated gay writer over the past decades, whose first two works helped usher in the 1980s boom of gay literature in Mexico. His literary trajectory is one of increasing personalization and self-exposure, of his own coming out.

Anthologist and journalist Carlos Monsiváis (b. 1938), one of the most highly respected authors in Latin America, is best known as a writer of chronicles and an essayist, mixing both genres in order to describe and explain the complexity of contemporary Mexican society, especially that of the Mexico City Metropolitan Area. Within these parameters, Monsiváis acknowledges his gay identity, although it is not the center of his chronicles. In some of his works Monsiváis criticizes a patriarchal and homophobic society that tends to ignore, to view with prejudice, and to harass the Mexican gay community and its manifestations.

Like Monsiváis, José Joaquín Blanco (b. 1951) is primarily known as a journalist and essayist who comments broadly and incisively on the contemporary Mexican scene, particularly that of Mexico City. He includes the gay community in his writings, as in his essay "Ojos que da pánico soñar" ("Eyes that Could Terrify Dreams"; 1979), one of the earliest Mexican texts on homosexual identity, and "Las púberes canéforas" ("The Pubescent Canephoros"; 1983), one of five novels Blanco has published to date.

Pablo Soler Frost (b. 1965) has published several homoerotic novels, such as Malebolge, which explores the always controversial liaison between homosexual desire and power, and La soldadesca ebria del emperador. Diario de Miguel III (The Emperor's Drunken Soldiery. Journal of Michael III), set in Byzantium. This novel depicts the relationship between the Emperor Michael III and his lover, who afterwards murdered him to ascend the throne as Basil I.

The most successful Mexican LGBTQ author is Luis Zapata Quiroz. He has been criticized for perpetuating the stereotypes of the US pattern of the tragic gay man, even though he never portrays homosexuality as a bad thing. Carlos Monsiváis has also considered in his critique the profound homoeroticism of the poets belonging to the group Los Contemporáneos ("The Contemporaries") between the late 1920s and mid-1940s.

Several of his poets, such as Xavier Villaurrutia, Carlos Pellicer, and Salvador Novo, were gay and "let themselves be touched, discreetly, by a theme very dear to the age: the sailors, in the aura of the night port, with their liberty and their beauty". The Chicano LGBTQ community has also created a thriving culture. Thus, Gloria E. Anzaldúa and Cherríe Moraga are two important authors within the North American LGBTQ community, and Francisco X. Alarcón, professor at the University of California, has published nine books of poetry.

== Art ==
Art and visual mediums in Mexico have been used throughout the nineteenth and twentieth centuries and have become essential to the way Mexico views its identity surrounding factors such as gender and sexuality.

Several artists, known as bisexual or homosexual, were reluctant to express their sexual desire in a context of limited tolerance. Agustín Lazo Adalid (1886–1971), pioneer of surrealism in Mexican art, member of Los Contemporáneos, and lover of Villaurrutia, abstained from painting male nudity, even though he was known to be homosexual.

Only three paintings by Alfonso Michel (1897–1957), another member of Los Contemporáneos, show male nudity in ways that are subtly erotic. Michel was homosexual, and his wealthy family supported his perpetual wanderings around the world in order to avoid a scandal in the conservative state of Colima, where he grew up. Manuel Rodríguez Lozano (1896–1971), another member of Los Contemporáneos, never hid his homosexuality and expressed it with great candour in drawings and paintings. His studio attracted younger painters, including Abraham Ángel (1905–1924), Julio Castellanos (1905–1947), and Ángel Torres Jaramillo (1912–1937), with whom Lozano maintained relationships.

Frida Kahlo (1901–1954), is one of the most important artists in modern Mexican art. She has been converted into a gay icon due to her fighter and non-conformist nature. Her work is seen by artists and critics alike as a crucial contribution to the deconstruction of the art world's male prerogatives and to the recognition of gender and sexual diversity as legitimate objects of visual representation. In her paintings, such as The Two Fridas and her Self portrait with cropped hair, she challenged conventional ideas about femininity and how gender is presented. Her occasional use of masculine clothing, direct gazes, and symbolic imagery disrupted gender norms of her time.

Rodolfo Morales (1925–2001) was a famous surrealist painter. Up until his death, Morales was regarded as one of Mexico's greatest living artists. Other LGBTQ painters and visual artists are Roberto Montenegro, Nahum B. Zenil, Julio Galán, Roberto Márquez, and Carla Rippey.

Another important way that art was utilized was for activism during the Frente de Liberación Homosexual (Mexico). or the Mexican Homosexual liberation movement, which emerged in 1971. This movement was led by Nancy Cárdenas, who was a lesbian activist, writer, and actor.[1]

One of the strategies utilized by this movement was to create and establish an annual cultural mobilization initially called Semana cultural gay (gay culture week). Since its creation, this even has gone through a few name changes. In 1992, the name of the event was changed to Semana cultural lesbica-gay, and the event's current name is Festival de diversddad sexual (sexual diversity festival). Starting in 1982, one of the key aspects of this event is an exhibit of artwork by members of the LGBT community, as well as allies, which is held at the National Autonomous University of Mexico's Museo Del Chopo. One of the founding member of this event was Mexican Artist Nahum B. Zenil.

It was these art exhibits during Festival de diversddad sexual, as well as other notable exhibitions, including Propuestas temáticas in 1983 and Las Transgresiones al cuerpo in 1997, which helped elevate the discussions surrounding the normalization of visual representations of homosexuality.

These exhibits were highly praised- by both artists and activists. Artist and LGBTQ ally Mónica Mayer described the importance of the event, stating that it was an alternative social space where people could join and interact. While Mexican writer and activist Carlos Monsiváis commented on how he felt these exhibits were "critical to the demonstration of Mexican life."

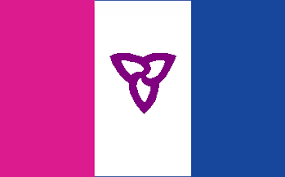
A Mexican variant of the bisexual pride flag, designed in 2001 by Francisco Javier Lagunes Gaitán and Miguel Angel Corona; it is emblazoned with an emblem of a trillium flower, as the trillium flower is a symbol of bisexuality.

In 1999, Michael Page established the use of the trillium flower as a symbol of bisexuality, and in 2001, Francisco Javier Lagunes Gaitán and Miguel Angel Corona designed a Mexican variant of the bisexual pride flag, which is emblazoned with an emblem of a trillium flower.

In December 2019, a painting called La Revolución by gay artist Fabián Cháirez was exhibited in Palacio de Bellas Artes. The painting depicted Emiliano Zapata as intentionally effeminate, riding an erect horse, nude except for high heels and a pink hat. According to the artist, he created the painting to combat machismo. The painting caused protests from the farmer's union and admirers of Zapata. His grandson Jorge Zapata González threatened to sue if the painting was not removed. There was a clash between supporters of the painting and detractors at the museum. A compromise was reached with some of Zapata's family; a label was placed next to the painting outlining their disagreement with the painting.

== Mass media and other publications ==
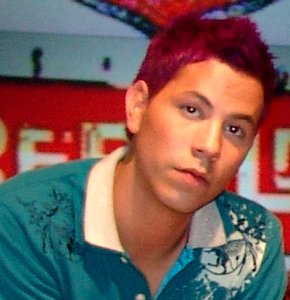
Christian Chávez at a press conference in 2006.

Singer, songwriter, and arranger Juan Gabriel (b. 1950) is one of the most popular and respected personalities in contemporary Mexican music. However, for years he was excluded from radio and television on account of being gay. Mexican singer Chavela Vargas (b. 1919), has one of the most recognizable voices in popular Mexican music. Vargas was faulted for her "obscene behavior", which included flirting with women in the audience and making spectacular entrances on motorcycles. In her autobiography, Vargas relates that she never intended to make a cause out of lesbianism, but she never chose to hide it either.

Cross-dressing actor Francis García (1958–2007) made a successful living portraying females in plays and on television shows. Openly bisexual actor Gabriel Romero played one of the first openly gay characters portrayed with dignity on Spanish-language television on 1999 GLAAD Media Award-nominated Telemundo sitcom "Los Beltrán."

Actor, pop star, and former RBD member Christian Chávez (b. 1983) came out in March 2007 after a web site posted pictures of him kissing another man at a 2005 Canadian civil ceremony. The eventual scandal received massive press coverage. Chávez told BBC News that he did not "want to keep on lying" and addressed his fans asking them not to judge him for being himself. Chávez is one of the few famous Mexican people who are openly gay.

Famous singer-songwriter Gloria Trevi, known as "Mexico's Madonna", has long supported LGBTQ people and is considered a gay icon. Trevi was quoted as saying she identified with her gay and lesbian fans because "I know what it feels like to be judged, discriminated and rejected." Her 2006 single and gay anthem, "Todos me miran" ("Everybody Is Staring at Me") deals with coming out and cross-dressing. Trevi said that she was inspired to write the song after listening to a young friend describe the feelings of hurt and alienation when his conservative family discovered he was gay. Another gay icon is pop singer Paulina Rubio, who has supported same-sex marriage. In late 2008, Rubio criticized actor Eduardo Verastegui for encouraging people to vote "yes" on Proposition 8 in order to ban same-sex marriage in California.

OHM is currently the only Mexican high-profile gay magazine distributed nationwide. Several well-known celebrities have been featured on the cover of the magazine, including actors Gael García and Luis Roberto Guzmán; pop singers Belinda, Ari Borovoy and Christian Chávez; and singer-songwriters Miguel Bosé and Gloria Trevi, among others. Mexico's only lesbian magazine, Les Voz, is sold publicly in Mexico City, Guadalajara, and Tijuana. Elsewhere in Mexico it is only available by subscription, due to the lack of lesbian-friendly outlets outside these centers.

== See also ==
- LGBTQ culture in Mexico City
- LGBTQ culture in Puerto Vallarta
- LGBTQ culture in Tijuana
