= Paul Stanley (actor) =

Mexican actor and television host

Paul Stanley Durruty
- Born: September 20, 1985 (age 40); Mexico City, Mexico
- Occupation: Actor
- Years active: 2008–Present
- Parents: Paco Stanley (father); Mónica Durruty (mother)

Paul Stanley Durruty (Mexico City, Mexico, September 20, 1985) is a Mexican actor and host.

== Career ==
Son of the late Mexican host Paco Stanley. Since childhood he loved acting, so he acted in various plays. He studied acting at Televisa with Patricia Reyes Spindola.

Among some of the videos that can be highlighted are: La trajinera del terror and Urban Tribes. He makes his acting debut in theater with the play "I can't" alongside figures like Denisse Padilla "La Mapacha", Lorena Enríquez and Claudia Cañedo.

Then, he participates in the children's play Pinocchio. In 2008, he participated in what would be his first participation on television, in the Central de abasto series, in which he participated together with Azela Robinson, Odemaris Ruiz, & Fabián, among others.

In 2009, he participated in the soap opera Camaleones, where he played Rolando Rincón. He shared credits with Belinda, Alfonso Herrera, Edith González, & Guillermo García Cantú, among others.

In 2010, he participated in Soy tu dueña, where he played Timoteo. He shared credits with Lucero, Fernando Colunga, Gaby Spanic, & Sergio Goyri, among others.

In 2012, he participated in A refuge for love playing Aldo San Emeterio Fuentes-Gil. He shared credits with Zuria Vega, Gabriel Soto, Laura Flores, Jessica Coch, & Frances Ondiviela, among others. He is also a presenter of the Hoy program, along with Galilea Montijo, Andrea Legarreta, Raúl Araiza Herrera, & Alessandra Rosaldo, among others.

In 2013, he participated in Porque el amor manda, playing Melquíades Quijano. He shared credits with Blanca Soto, Fernando Colunga, Carmen Salinas, Claudia Álvarez, & Luis Couturier, among others.

He is currently the presenter of the program Amor-didas together with Silvia Olmedo. In addition to hosting the Hoy program, he hosts the show ¡Cuéntamelo ya, al fin!, along with Roxana Castellanos and Cynthia Urías.

Between 2014 and 2015 he was one of the co-hosts of the successful program Sábado gigante, together with the renowned Chilean animator Mario Kreutzberger, better known as Don Francisco, as well as Javier Romero, Alejandra Espinoza, Aleyda Ortíz, & Rosina Grosso, among others.

In 2015 he participated in Amor de barrio, playing Gabriel Madrigal. He shared credits with Renata Notni, Mane de la Parra, Ale García, Pedro Moreno, Julieta Rosen, & Marisol del Olmo, among others.

== Filmography ==
=== Television ===
- La casa de los famosos México (2023)
- Tal para cual (2022) as El Patotas
- Perdiendo el juicio (2021) as Judge
- Mi querida herencia (2019) as Carlos
- Miembros al aire (2019) as Host
- Buenas Vibras (2017) as Host
- ¡Cuéntamelo Ya, al fin! (2016-2023) as Host and panelist of "Los Tu-vasos"
- Sueño de amor (2016) as Adán Tenorio
- Amor de barrio (2015) as Gabriel Madrigal Bernal
- Sábado Gigante (2014-2015)
- Despierta América (2014)
- Cásate conmigo, mi amor (2013) as Emilio Mejía
- México suena de noche (2013)
- Porque el amor manda (2012-2013) as Melquíades Quijano
- Hoy (2012-2014; 2017-2023) as Host
- Un refugio para el amor (2012) as Aldo San Emeterio Fuentes-Gil
- Soy tu dueña (2010) as Timoteo
- Camaleones (2009-2010) as Rolando Rincón
- Central de abasto (2008) as Paco

=== Theatre ===
- Pinocchio (2004)
- No puedo (2006)
- Don Juan Tenorio (2006)
- Perfume de gardenias (2012)
- La caja (2012)
- Aventurera (2013)
- El Tenorio cómico (2014)
- El Secuestro de la Cuquis (2015-2016)
- Standofilia Stand up comedy (2016)

== Awards ==
=== TVyNovelas Awards ===
Year	Category	Name	Result
2011	Best Male Revelation	Soy tu dueña	Won
2015	Best Young Lead Actor	Amor de barrio	Nominated
