= Esteban Arce =

Mexican television entertainer

Esteban Arce (born c. 1962) is a Mexican television entertainer.

== Early life ==
He was born in Mexico City and lived with 2 brothers and 2 sisters named José Luís, Eduardo, Alejandra, and Adriana in a little house in delegación Benito Juarez. He loved soccer and to his day he is a big fan of Atlante F.C. (Mexican soccer team for which he played for in the reserves.)

== Career ==
His first program was in radio in Telehit, then his first program in television was El Calabozo Later he moved to Miami to be a writer for Univision. He returned to Mexico. He worked for a while in Trapitos al Sol. He moved again to Miami for four years. He worked in Cotorreando and in the second of July in 2007 he appeared in Matutino Express for the first time. His show is about making fun of news. He is every week 1st or 2nd in the morning ratings. His program is from 7 to 10 A.M. on Canal Cuatro (channel 4). In a few months his show will appear on Galavision in the U.S. He has 3 children named Esteban who is 14 years old, Maria José who is 5 years old, and Marene who is 9 years old. He is married with Nieves Sanisteban.

Arce was the third addition to the Telemundo tabloid show, after his program Calabozo, Cotorreando. He is known for his jokes, and his apparently amicable, on camera feud with co-host Mauricio Zeilic (the show has four co-hosts). Arce has been reprimanded on camera a few times by show producers for some comments that he has made. Public opinion about him is split: Although many see him as a host with good sense of humor, others consider his comments to be disrespectful. Because the majority of the public seems to like his humor. Arce does not discriminate when it comes to joking about entertainers: Some of his favorite targets seem to include Mexican superstars such as María Félix, Luis Miguel and Irma Serrano, but he has also made jokes about Julio Sabala, Madonna, Michael Jackson and Marc Anthony, among others.

Arce worked as an interviewer during Telemundo's airing of the 2004 Premios Billboard Latinos, where he interviewed, among others, David Bisbal and Ricky Martin. He told Martin in Spanish that The only way I can get women is by hanging out with you!. In January 2007 he signed a contract with Televisa and his new program Matutino Express is one of the most successful shows in the country. It is a show with news comedy and Esteban's ongoing humor that mixes up topics and makes fun of his co-workers. Arce also appeared as himself in the episode "La Casa del Millón" of the comedy series, Una familia de diez.

He now works in Mexico in Matutino Express.

== Controversy over homosexuality views and homophobic comments ==
After a video of the December 18, 2009 "Matutino Express" was posted online and virally distributed in January 2010, controversy spread about the Arce's question and comments around sexual orientations vs sexual behavior, during the program Arce asked whether homosexual orientation was "normal" to the program's recurrent (sexologist Elsy Reyes) quite repeatedly since the sexologist failed to provide a straight answer to whether it was or not; during the exchange Elsy said that among some mammals homosexuality was a known behavior to which Arce replied that indeed the behavior exists although is considered "animal dementia". The most active media of discussion was Twitter, where a trend topic #Estebanarcefueradelaire (Spanish for "[take] Esteban Arce off air") was started and got full of petitions directed to Emilio Azcárraga Jean, president of Televisa, to replace Arce as host of Matutino Express. A video showing the debate with Reyes was posted on YouTube and distributed on other social networks like Facebook, where other groups have also criticized Arce. Esteban has been known for other homophobic comments on radio and TV shows over time making him the target of multiple critiques.
