= Adriana Riveramelo =

Mexican journalist and actress (born 1970)

- Born: Adriana Gabriela Riveramelo Quintana; 24 December 1970 (age 55); Mexico City, Distrito Federal, Mexico
- Occupations: Journalist, presenter, television actress, singer
- Spouse: Gerardo Camarena (m. 2002; div. 2007)
- Children: 1

Adriana Gabriela Riveramelo Quintana (born 24 December 1970), known professionally as Adriana Riveramelo, is a Mexican journalist, presenter, television actress and singer. She studied at the Artistic Education Center of Televisa and since 1994 has hosted various television programs and awards ceremonies. In 2007, after the birth of her son, Riveramelo became a presenter and took over the entertainment section of Matutino Express with Esteban Arce and José Ramón Sancristóbal.

== Biography ==
Adriana Riveramelo began her career as a singer at age 16, joining a musical group in 1988 and six years later was hired by TV Azteca as a reporter for programs like Ciudad Desnuda. In 1997, she was invited to work for Televisa as a reporter and then as the host of the program La Botana with Juan José Origel. Riveramelo entered acting in 1999, appearing on the Mexican telenovela Siempre te amaré with such actors as Laura Flores and Fernando Carrillo. She has hosted TV shows such as Hoy Sábado, El Club and Dilo, and dilo VIP and awards for Televisa like El Heraldo de México, the Premios Eres, and Premios TVyNovelas. Since 2007, Riveramelo is the host of Matutino Express's news and entertainment sections, sharing every news broadcast with Esteban Arce and Ulises de la Torre.

== Person life ==
In 2002, she married Gerardo Camarena and two years later became a mother. Her son, named Luciano, was born on August 25, 2004. Following the birth of her child, the television host decided to take a break from show business, returning in 2007. Before her return to the media, Adriana Riveramelo divorced her husband.
