= Paola Rojas =

Mexican television news anchor (born 1976)

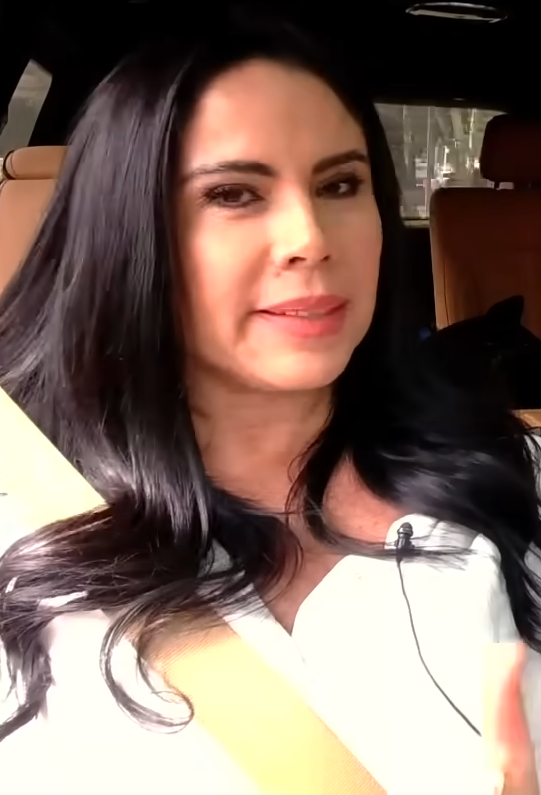
- Rojas in 2025
- Born: Paola Rojas Hinojosa; November 20, 1976 (age 49); Mexico City, Mexico
- Spouse: Luís Roberto Alves (m. 2009; div. 2018)
- Children: 2

Paola Rojas (born Paola Rojas Hinojosa; November 20, 1976) is a Mexican television news anchor. Born in Mexico City, Rojas' education started in the fine arts at a very young age. Her father was Jorge Rojas.

== Career ==
Rojas' career started at the radio station Vox FM, where she worked aside the famous Mexican journalist Ricardo Rocha in the Detrás de la Noticia program.

Not long after that, she moved to the Music Network Telehit, where she worked with Horacio Villalobos in Válvula de Escape.

In 2002, she also participated as a judge in the reality show Popstars and then she got her own program called Encuentros Cercanos besides her good friend Poncho Vera.

During that time she hosted another radio show called La Talacha in W Radio, along with Ricardo Zamora, Fernanda Tapia and Mariana del Valle. She also formed part of the team of Planeta 3, with Eduardo Videgaray and José Ramón San Cristóbal.

Then she moved the news program El Cristal con que se mira, and months later she became part of Televisa's news team as the host of A las Tres, which she still hosts until today. She also host a weekly radio news program airing on the Radio Formula network.

== Honors and awards ==
Currently, Paola received an award for being one of Televisa's most successful women, called Mujer Activa. She was married to Mexican soccer legend, Luís Roberto Alves (Zague).
