= Anaís Salazar =

Mexican actress (born 1974)

- Born: Ana Isabel Jiménez Salazar; July 26, 1974 (age 50); Culiacán, Sinaloa, Mexico
- Occupations: Actress; hostess; singer
- Years active: 1995–present

Ana Isabel Jiménez Salazar (born 26 July 1974), known professionally as Anaís Salazar, is a Mexican actress, hostess and singer.

== Early life ==
Anaís was born July 26, 1974, in Culiacán, Sinaloa. She studied up to the fourth semester of Law Faculty of the University of Culiacan, until she discovers her talent for acting, so she has participated in telenovelas Bajo un mismo rostro, Tú y yo, Huracán and El Privilegio de Amar. In addition to television, Anaís has also participated in theater, starred as Doña Inés in Don Juan Tenorio and Cinderella in the play of the same name.

In 2002 hosted on television program El club. In 2003 hosted on television daily TV Show Hoy then with Laura Flores, Arturo Peniche and Patrick Cabezut and later alongside Andrea Legarreta and Ernesto Laguardia. In 2006 played as special appearance in the telenovela La Fea Más Bella. Later she played in the telenovelas Código Postal, Pasión, Camaleones and La que no podía amar.

== Filmography ==
Telenovelas, Series, TV Show
| Year | Title | Role | Notes |
|---|---|---|---|
| 1995 | Bajo un mismo rostro | | Special appearance |
| 1996-97 | Tú y yo | Silvia | Supporting role |
| 1997-98 | Huracán | | Special appearance |
| 1998-99 | El Privilegio de Amar | Gisela | Supporting role |
| 2002 | El club | Herself/hostess | TV show |
| 2002 | Operación triunfo: México | Herself | TV show |
| 2003-05 | Hoy | Herself/hostess | TV show |
| 2004 | Vas o no vas con Boletazo | Herself | TV show |
| 2005 | Vecinos | Mariana | 21 episodes |
| 2006 | Los mejores músicos.com | Herself/hostess | TV show |
| 2006 | Al medio día | Herself/hostess | TV show |
| 2006 | Súper mamá | Herself/hostess | TV show |
| 2006-07 | La Fea Más Bella | Herself | Special appearance |
| 2006-07 | Código Postal | Amanda Montero | Supporting role |
| 2007 | Latin Grammy Celebra: Marco Antonio Solis | Herself | TV show |
| 2007-08 | Pasión | Manuela Lafont y Espinoza | Supporting role |
| 2008 | La rosa de Guadalupe | Lucía/Carmina | 2 episodes |
| 2008 | Mujeres Asesinas | Nora Mendizabal | Episode: "Martha, asfixiante" |
| 2009-10 | Camaleones | Evangelina de Márquez | Supporting role |
| 2011-12 | La que no podía amar | Mercedes Durán Esquivel | Supporting role |
