= Los Monchis =

- Starring: Lalo and Beto
- Country of origin: Mexico

Production
- Production locations: Telehit Studios; Mexico City, Federal District

Original release
- Network: Telehit
- Release: present

Los Monchis is a television show from the Mexican TV network Telehit hosted by Lalo and Beto.
