= Guau! =

- Starring: Alex Kaffie and Alejandra Bogue
- Country of origin: Mexico

Production
- Production location: Mexico City

Original release
- Network: Telehit
- Release: present

Guau! is a talkshow for the Mexican gay community transmitted by Telehit, hosted by Alex Kaffie and Alejandra Bogue.
