= TeleHit =

Mexican television network

Telehit
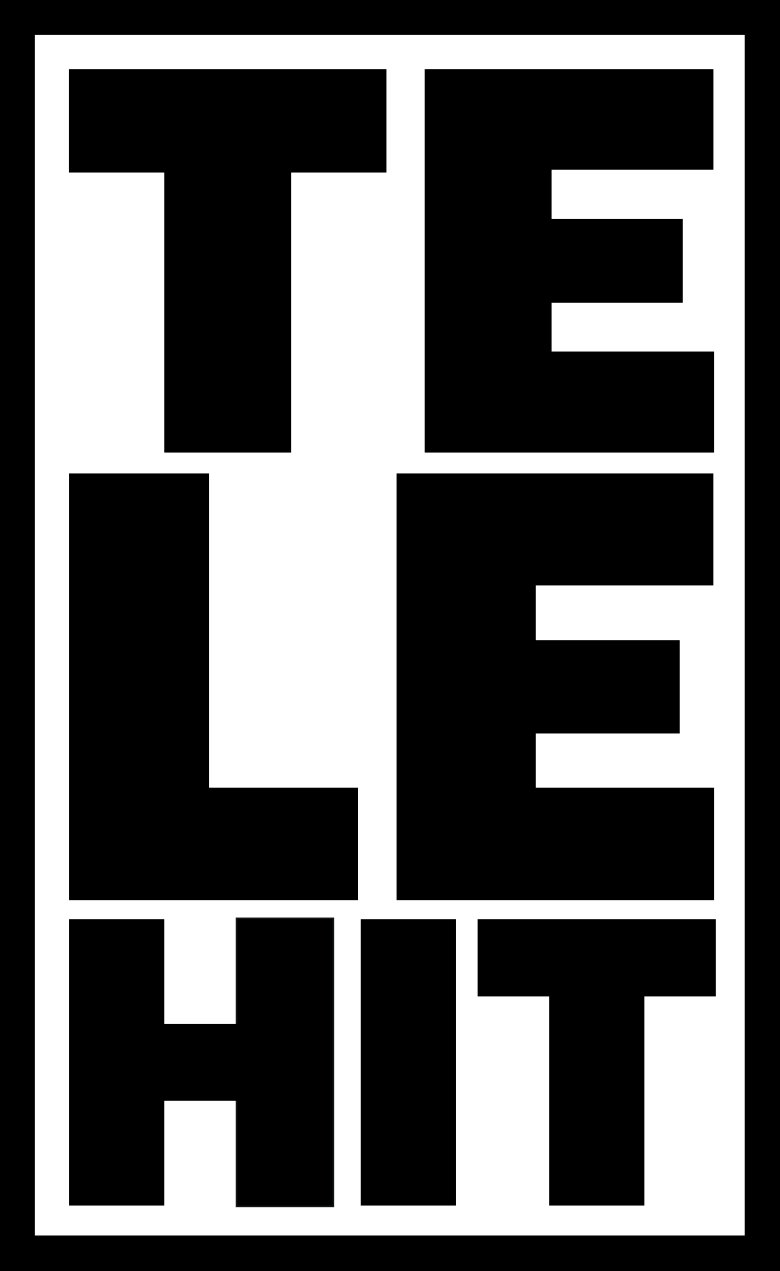
- Country: Mexico
- Broadcast area: Mexico; Latin America; United States

Programming
- Language: Spanish
- Picture format: 1080i HDTV (downscaled to 480i/576i for the SDTV feed)

Ownership
- Owner: Televisa Networks (TelevisaUnivision)

History
- Launched: August 27, 1993; 32 years ago

Links
- Website: www.telehit.com

Availability

Streaming media
- Service(s): YouTube TV and Vidgo

TeleHit is a Mexican cable/satellite television network. Its main programming is music and music videos. It is a part of Televisa Networks, an affiliate of TelevisaUnivision, and is also available in various countries in Latin America and the United States.

Broadcasting since 1993, Telehit became the second Spanish language music video network under MTV. What began as a Spanish music network, now is universal fusion of different musical rhythms, like pop, rock, electronic, hip-hop and reggaeton.

Besides music videos, the channel also broadcasts concerts, TV specials and general-interest content for youth. Telehit has also been a platform for hosts and actors to being into Mexican show business.

== Telehit Awards ==
The Telehit Awards were first presented on November 5, 2008. They emerged in commemoration of its 15 years on Mexican television. These awards recognize the most outstanding artists in music.

== Hosts ==
=== Current ===
- Adina Burak
- Ceci Flores
- Barbara Islas
- Raul Gemeneses
- Gwendolyne García Leets
- Angie Tadei
- Claudio Rodríguez Medellín
- Karla Gómez
- Mery Roo
- Román
- Amanda Rosa
- Alex Kaffie
- Alejandra Bogue
- Sergi Mass
- Uriel del Toro
- Melissa López
- Odalys Ramírez
- Silvia Olmedo
- Karla Luna
- Karla Panini
- Juan Carlos Nava "El Borrego"
- Juan Carlos Casasola
- Leia Freitas
- Platanito
- Kalimba Marichal
- Mario Cuevas "La Garra"
- Beto y Lalo
- Natalia Tellez

=== Previous ===
- Jorge Van Rankin
- Facundo
- Diego
- Omar Chaparro
- Esteban Arce
- Sabrina Sabrok
- Mónica Noguera
- Yolanda Andrade
- Montserrat Olivier
- Kalinda Cano
- Angie Fajardo
- Horacio Villalobos
- Lino Nava
- Alfredo Fernández
- Camila Sodi
- Poncho Vera
- Eduardo España (Margara Francisca)
- Paola Rojas
- Paula Sánchez
- Eduardo Videgaray
- Adriana Sodi
- José Ramón San Cristóbal
- Jonathan Molina
- Federico Padilla "Perico"
- Rafael Valderrama
- Luz Blanchet
- Martha Carrillo
- Andrea Legarreta
- Kristoff

=== Featured shows ===
==== Current ====
- Qué News Telehit
- Teleheat
- Jellyfish
- Top Topos
- Tu Talento Mis Contactos
- Retro Vibes
- Playhit
- Hot Songs
- Ok Pop
- Érase una vez
- D - Generaciones
- Tinderella
- Top 10 K-Pop
- Las Lavanderas
- La Escuelita Telehit
- Guerra de Chistes
- La isla del costeño
- Colección de oro
- Dementes Brillantes
- Adictos al Humor

==== Past ====
- +Mas Nescafé
- Calibre 45
- El Calabozo
- Telehit Live
- Depásonico
- Guaguarones S.A.
- No Manches
- Hi!
- Válvula de Escape
- Sabrina
- Desde Gayola
- Fresas con Chile
- Toma Libre
- Incógnito
- Las hijas de la madre Tierra
- Black & White
- El Planeta de Cabeza
- El Pulso
- Encuentros Cercanos
- El Show del Polaco
- Kristoff Presenta

== Logos ==
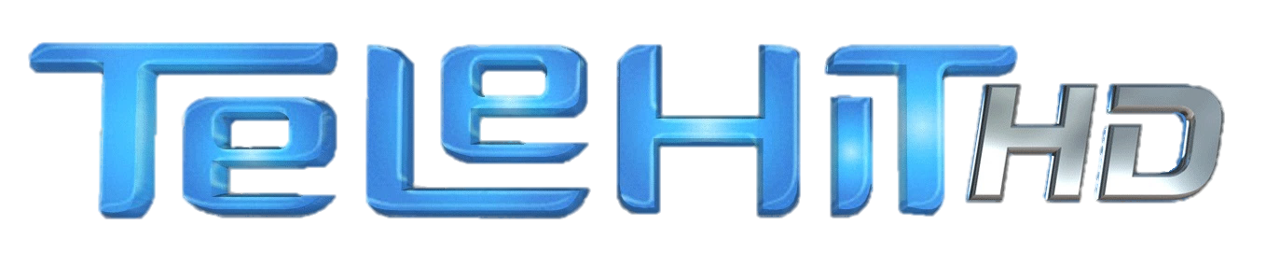
HD Channel, 2014-2017

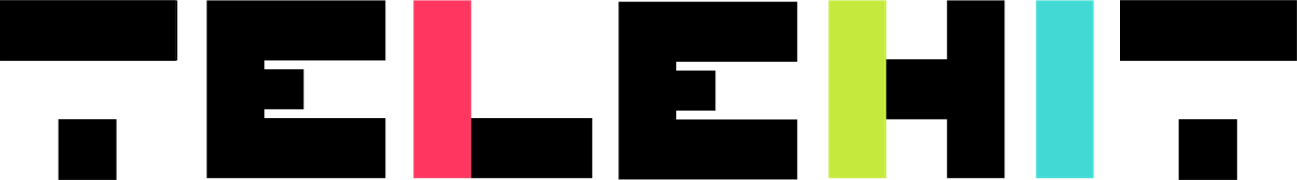
2017-2018

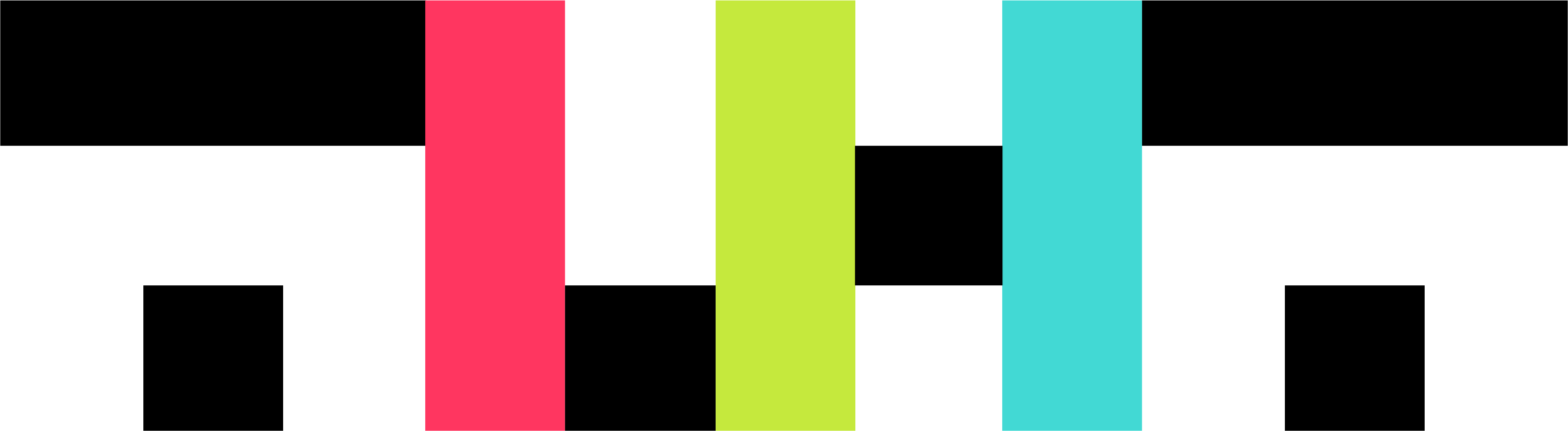
Logo in screen, 2017-2018

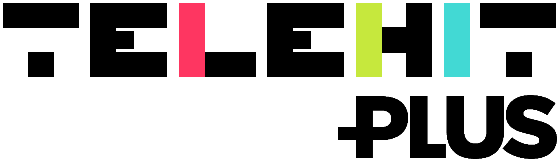
HD Channel, 2017-2018

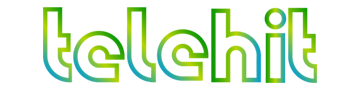
2018-2020

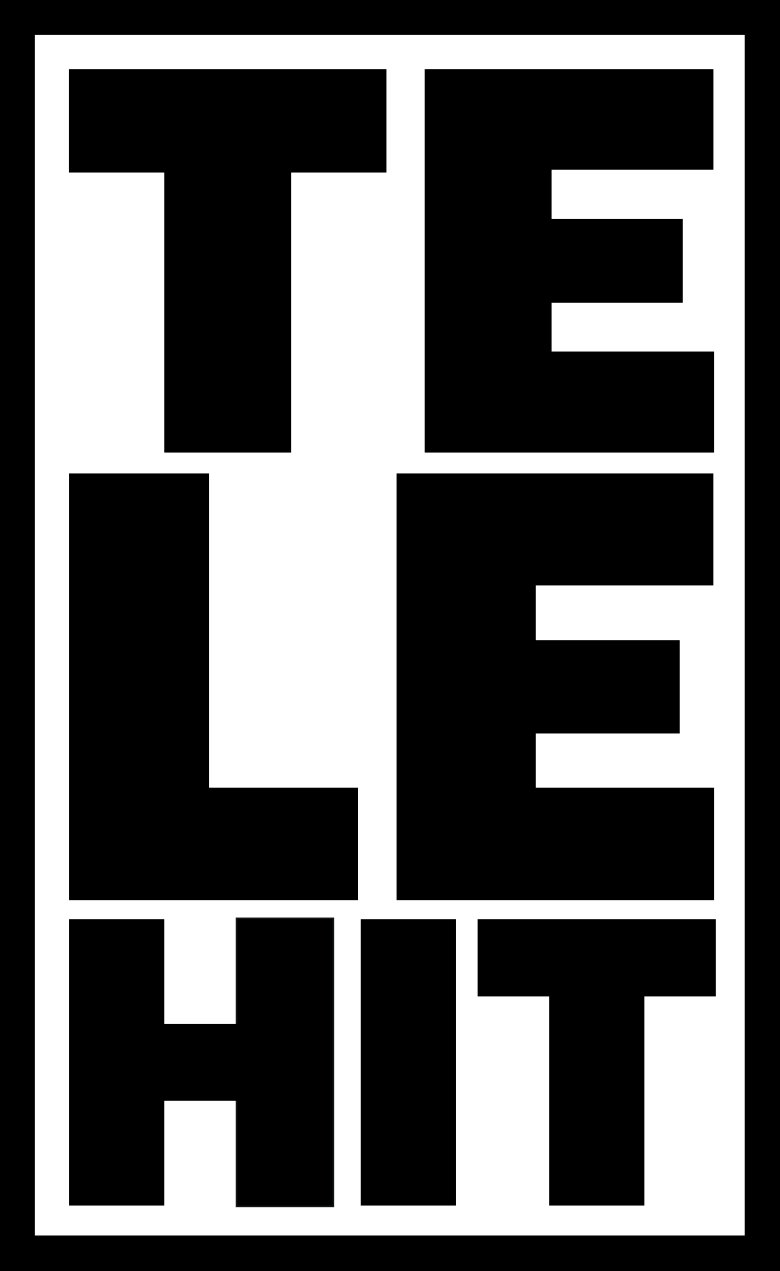
2020–present
