= Mauricio Zeilic =

Cuban-American show business reporter (born c. 1947)

Mauricio Zeilic (born c. 1947) is a Cuban-American show business reporter.

A paparazzo for more than a decade, Zeilic was one of the five hosts of Cotorreando, a show dedicated to talking about the lives of movie and music stars. Zeilic has earned various awards during his career as a reporter. He has appeared together with some of his co-hosts in commercials for Sears and Motorola.

Host Luisa Fernanda left the show "Cotorreando" in June 2007. The show ran until September 28, 2007 when it was cancelled by Telemundo.
