= Paco Stanley =

Mexican television presenter (1942–1999)

Francisco "Paco" Stanley
- Stanley in 1999
- Born: Francisco Jorge Stanley Albaitero; 3 July 1942; Mexico City, Mexico
- Died: 7 June 1999 (aged 56); Mexico City, Mexico
- Cause of death: Murder by shooting
- Resting place: Panteón Español, Mexico City; 19.458744°N 99.203038°W
- Other name: Paco Pacorro
- Education: National Autonomous University of Mexico
- Occupations: Presenter; comedian; politician
- Years active: 1969–1999
- Employers: Televisa (1979–1997); Noticias ECO (1988–1995); TV Azteca (1998–1999)
- Political party: Institutional Revolutionary Party
- Spouses: María Solís; Patricia Pedroza
- Children: 4, including Paul

Francisco Jorge Stanley Albaitero (3 July 1942 – 7 June 1999), known by his stage name Paco Stanley, was a Mexican television entertainer who worked for Televisa and TV Azteca. He also participated directly, for a time, in political activities in his country, as he was a member of the PRI. He was murdered on June 7, 1999.

== Early life ==
Francisco Jorge Stanley Albaitero was born in Mexico City on July 3, 1942. He is the son of Francisco Stanley Muñoz and Josefina Albaitero Vivanco and was baptized on August 8 of the same year.

== Career ==
Stanley began his career in radio in 1969. From 1974, he appeared in television programs like XEW News. For this network, he hosted the show Sonrisas y sorpresas.

After years of being a sidekick to comedians such as Madaleno, in 1991 he was offered his own show on Televisa, ¡Ándale!, with Arlette Garibay and Benito Castro. Later television work included Llévatelo and Pácatelas with Mario Bezares.

In 1998, he hosted the show Un poco de Paco en radio in its comic version.

He left Televisa and signed a contract in 1998 with rival network TV Azteca. On 15 December, he started his show Una tras otra, co-starring Jorge Gil and Mario Bezares. The show gained attention after Stanley's assassination for his aggressive and often offensive sense of humor, especially towards Bezares. In 1999, he launched a nighttime show, titled ¡Sí hay, y bien!.

Stanley also appeared in theatre, starring in a comic version of the play Don Juan Tenorio, which toured across Mexico.

== Personal life ==
Stanley's first marriage was with María Solís, with whom he had only one son, Francisco. After several years, he married Patricia Pedroza, with whom he had two children, Leslie and Francisco Stanley Pedroza. However, in an extramarital relationship, Paco had a third son, Paul Stanley (Now host of the morning program Hoy).

== Death ==
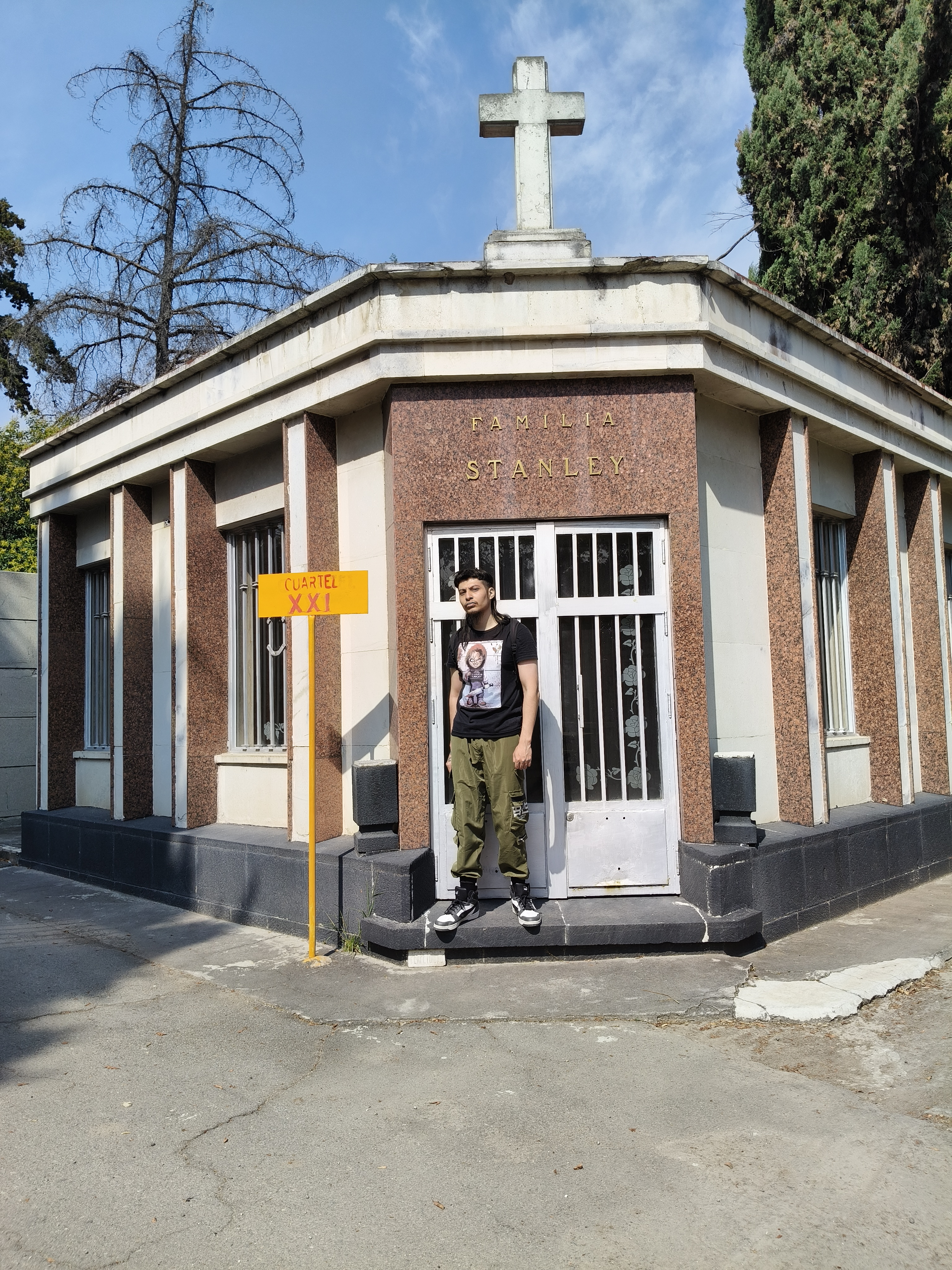
Grave of Stanley at the Panteón Español in Mexico City, photographed in 2025

On 7 June 1999, Stanley, Mario Bezares and Jorge Gil left the TV Azteca studios after their morning show Una Tras Otra to eat in the El Charco de las Ranas restaurant in Periférico, Mexico City's busy beltway. Prior to the shooting, witnesses reported seeing Bezares take a phone call before leaving the table to go to the restroom. While Stanley, Gil, and his driver were waiting outside the restaurant after the meal inside his black Lincoln Navigator, three individuals walked towards the car and started shooting, firing more than 20 rounds. Stanley was hit in the head with three shots, killing him instantly. The remaining shots wounded Gil and other bystanders.

Mexican TV networks Televisa and TV Azteca interrupted their programming to announce the news. That day, two news anchors from TV Azteca and the president of TV Azteca Ricardo Salinas Pliego blamed Mexico City's mayor Cuauhtémoc Cárdenas for poor governance, due to the high crime rate in the city.

Mario Bezares and another of Stanley's colleagues, Paola Durante, were arrested in connection with the murder and detained for over a year before being released. On 5 April 2011, Luis Alberto Salazar Vega was arrested and charged with Stanley's assassination, based on the testimony of a former cellmate.
