= Mitzy (fashion designer) =

Mexican fashion designer

- Website: mitzy.mx

Jorge García Cardenas, better known as Mitzy, (born Municipio de La Huacana, Michoacán, 1955) is a Mexican fashion designer known for his work on television.

== Early life ==
Mitzy was born in Michoacan, Mexico among a family of peasants. His father was murdered when he was 5 years old. At 14 he went to Mexico City to work but lived on the streets for 8 months before being invited by a shady character who promised to help him but instead made him suffer sexual abuse. The man was later arrested and sent to prison.

He later met Francis, a transgender vedette and drag queen. From Francis, he learned fashion design.

== Biography ==
Later on he met stylist Alfredo Palacios and actress and singer Verónica Castro, who hires him as a dresser. Olga Guillot, Lupita D’alesio, Olga Breenskin, y Thalía later wore his designs.

Thalía's wedding gown

In 2000, when Thalía married music manager Tommy Mottola, she decided to use one of Mitzy's designs, despite the fact that she already had a compromise with Dior.

== Conversion ==
In 2003, after speaking with Federica Sodi, Thalía's sister, Mitzy became a Christian.
