= Luisa Fernanda =

Mexican television presenter

Luisa Fernanda is a former television entertainment news anchor, radio broadcaster, theatre and soap actress, singer and model. She was born on December 17th, 1970 in Mexico City. She worked for HSE in 2001 then Telemundo until the end of 2007. She co-animated two talk shows for Univision Radio, and hosted exclusive interviews for Terra.com. At the beginning of 2012, she signed with Azteca Networks to work in Mexico City, but shortly after decided to go back to the US and rejoin Univision.

== Biography ==
Luisa Fernanda has been working on television since 1987, when she began her career as a host in Mexico, as well as a member of Garibaldi the music group, where she sang together with Patty Manterola, Pilar Montenegro, Katia Llanos, Sergio Mayer, Javier Ortiz, Victor Noriega and Charly López.

Her looks garnered the attention of some model agencies, and soon, she was named one of the top fifty most beautiful women of México. In 1994, she left Garibaldi.

From 1990 to 1998, she worked in many telenovelas for Televisa, including Alcanzar una estrella and Agujetas de Color de Rosa, El premio mayor, soap operas which were mainly geared towards Latin American teenagers. She was also a cast member of one of the most successful theatre comedy plays in Mexico for over five years. Deceive me if you can and participated in several other different plays through the years and has participated as a director assistant in some others.

In 2000, she went to the United States to work at the Home Shopping Network's Spanish channel.

Less than a year in the US, she was hired by Telemundo/NBC to host the network morning show De mañanita. Soon after she was cast to co-host the network entertainment news show Cotorreando, alongside Mauricio Zeilic.

Apart from covering daily show business news, she has also covered live special events from Los Angeles, California, Mexico, New York, Texas and Puerto Rico, among many other places.

In June 2007, after making homophobic remarks, she was fired from the NBC Universal owned network. The following September, she signed a contract with Univision Network Group to co-anchor 2 radio talk shows for Univision Radio titled El Arañazo and El Colmillo. That same year, she was signed by Spanish internet portal Terra.com as a celebrity correspondent.

As of February 2012, she went back to Mexico City to co-host Buenas Noches America, a nightly variety show on Azteca América a TV Azteca owned Network where she also was a guest co-host several times on the TV Azteca network morning show Venga la Alegria but decided to go back to US to join Enrique Santos during his time on Univision Radio on the Enrique Santos Morning Show which was broadcast nationwide in 11 cities and became the Number one Morning Show in English and Spanish markets.

She left Univision Radio in 2017 to briefly work at Radio Caracol in Miami, a subsidiary of the Spanish media conglomerate PRISA.

In February 2018 she started traveling all over promoting the reunion of Garibaldi, the music group that propelled her to fame to celebrate the group's 30th anniversary which will be celebrated with a TV special hosting many star guests, a new record and a world tour.
