= Hoy (TV program) =

Mexican television program

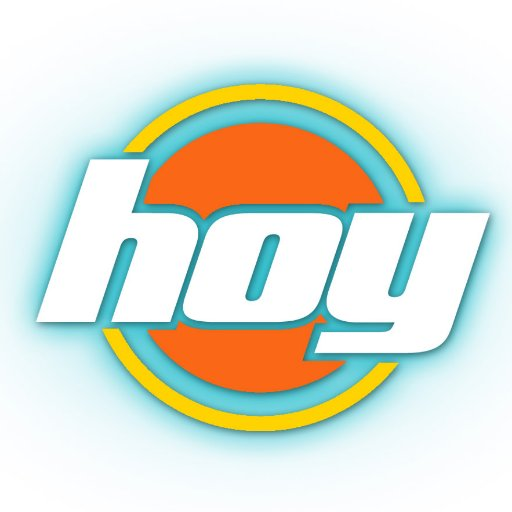
- Genre: Morning news/talk show
- Directed by: Pablo Calasso; Rodrigo Garay
- Presented by: Galilea Montijo; Andrea Legarreta; Raúl Araiza; Andrea Escalona; Paul Stanley; Arath de la Torre; Marisol González; Tania Rincón; Nicola Porcella
- Country of origin: Mexico
- Original language: Spanish

Production
- Executive producers: Alexis Núñez Oliva (1998–1999); Alejandro Cacéres (1999–2000); Federico Wilkins (2000–2002); Reynaldo López (2003–2006, 2016–2018); Carmen Armendáriz (2005–2008, 2009–2013); Roberto Romagnoli (2008–2009); Carla Estrada (2013–2015); Magda Rodríguez (2018–2020); Andrea Rodríguez (2020–present)
- Production locations: Mexico City, Mexico (1998–present)
- Camera setup: Multi-camera
- Running time: 180 minutes (including commercials); 60 minutes (Univision version; with commercials)
- Production company: Televisa

Original release
- Network: Univision; Las Estrellas
- Release: August 3, 1998 – present

Hoy is a Mexican morning television show produced by Televisa and broadcast on Las Estrellas. Since its first broadcast, on August 3, 1998, the program had several stages. Being the longest-running program and the most watched on Mexican television in the morning. The sections focus on entertainment, horoscopes, the summary of soap operas, beauty, cooking, health, games, humor and music.

== Presenters ==
Name	Debut
Andrea Legarreta	(1998–2000, 2003–present)
Galilea Montijo	(1998, 2004-2007, 2008–present)
Raúl Araiza	(2007–present)
Paul Stanley	(2011–2012, 2017–present)
Jorge van Rankin	(2013–2020)
Marisol González	(2019–2021)
Andrea Escalona	(2018–present)
Arath De La Torre	(2000, 2021–present)
Tania Rincon	(2021–present)

Contributors

- Martha Figueroa (2016–present)
- Mizada Mohamed (2000–2002, 2008–present)
- Yogui (2016–present)
- Kalinda Kano (2016–present)
- Veronica Toussaint (2016–present)
- Eduardo Salazar (2016–present)
- César Lozano (2016–present)
- Capi Albores (1998–2000, 2020–present)
- Fernanda Centeno (2016–2020, 2021–present)
- Sofia Villalobos (1998-2000, 2005-2008, 2019-present)

== Former presenters and contributors ==
- Mauricio Mancera (2018–2019)
- Pedro Prieto (2014-2020)
- Yanet García (2018–2019)
- Mhoni "Vidente" (2017–2019)
- Natalia Téllez (2016–2019)
- Maca Carriedo (2016–2018)
- Rosa Concha (2018-2020)
- Chano Jurado (2016-2020)
- Liz Torres (2015-2020)
- Ricardo Margaleff (2016–2018)
- Alfredo Gudini (2016–2018)
- Alfredo Oropeza (2003–2018)
- Alex Kaffie (2016–2018)
- Reynaldo Rossano (2006–2013, 2016–2018)
- Jorge Gaska (2013–2015)
- Juan José Origel (2013–2015)
- Héctor Sandarti (2013–2015)
- Malillany Marín (2015)
- Jan (2013–2015)
- Adal Ramones (2015)
- Shanik Berman (1990–2019)
- Claudia de Icaza
- Samia (2020-2021)
- Jorge Ugalde
- Alejandro Maldonado (2006-2009, 2013-2015)
- Jesus Gibaja
- Dominika Paleta
- Pita Ojeda
- Morris
- Jessica Segura
- Yurem (2014–2015)
- Jorge Ortiz de Pinedo
- Fortuna Dichi
- Santos Briz Fernandez
- Claudio Herrera
- Alan Estrada (2012)
- Alan Tacher (2011–2012)
- Beng Zeng (2011)
- Martha Carrillo (1998–2000, 2006–2007)
- Angelica Maria (2008)
- Alfredo Adame (1998–2002)
- Flor Rubio
- Mara Patricia Castañeda
- Jorge Poza (2006–2007)
- Leticia Calderón (2006–2007)
- Talina Fernández (1998–1999)
- Angélica Vale (2000)
- Danna Paola (2003)
- Laura Flores (2000–2003, 2008)
- Diego Schoening (2000)
- Arturo Peniche (2000-2003)
- Antonio de Valdes
- Anette Cuburu (2008–2010)
- Sofia Villalobos (1998-2000, 2006-2008)
- Vielka Valenzuela (2005-2008)
- Patrico Cabezut (2003–2008)
- Fernanda Familiar (2000)
- Gloria Calzada (2002)
- Silvia Lomeli (2001–2004)
- Juan José Ulloa (2000–2004)
- Francisco Fortuño
- Anselmo Alonso
- Amina Blancarte
- Martha Guzmán
- Carlos Eduardo Rico
- Amira
- Horacio Villalobos (1998)
- Miguel Gurwitz
- Fabián Lavalle (2000-2002, 2008-2012)
- Angie Pérez Dávila
- Ernesto Laguardia (2003–2011)
- Anaís (2003–2005)
- María Luisa Valdés Doria (2003-2005)
- Francisco Ramírez
- Pablo Reinah
- Roxana Castellanos (2009–2012, 2018)
- Alessandra Rosaldo (2012)
- Mario Vanucchi (2011)
- Gloria Aura (2013)
- Penelope Menchaca (2004–2009)
- Denisse Padilla (2004–2006–2013)
- Adriana Riveramelo (2000–2002)
- Gabriela Ramírez (2002–2004)
- Rodolfo Jiménez (2009–2013)
- Rocío Cárdenas (2003–2004)
- Arturo Carmona (2005–2009, 2020)

== Segments ==
Title	Notes
Shows	Presented by Alex Kaffie & Martha Figueroa
Horoscopes	Presented by Mizada Mohamed
Summary of the telenovelas	Presented by the hosts or hostess and Alfredo Gudini
Beauty	Presented by Kalinda Kano
Yoga	Presented by Veronica Toussaint
Cooking	Presented by the hosts or hostess on recipes prepared, the chef Alfredo Oropeza and the chef Yogui
Social media	Presented by Natalia Téllez, Pedro Prieto and Maca Carriedo
Tips for organic cooking	
Tips holistic	
Reports	
Proponents of the asphalt	
Sports	Presented by hosts (exclusively during the Olympic Games or World Cup)
The forum of humor	
Sexuality	
The note from today	
Technology	
News	Presented by Eduardo Salazar
Comedy section	Presented by Ricardo Margaleff and Reynaldo Rossano

== International release ==
Country	Network(s)	Show premiere	Show finale
Mexico	El Canal de las Estrellas	August 3, 1998	present
United States	Univision; Galavision	August 29, 2011 – April 3, 2012; September 10, 2012; April 3, 2012	2024
El Salvador	VTV Canal 35	May 1, 2011	present
