= Pepillo Origel =

Juan José Origel
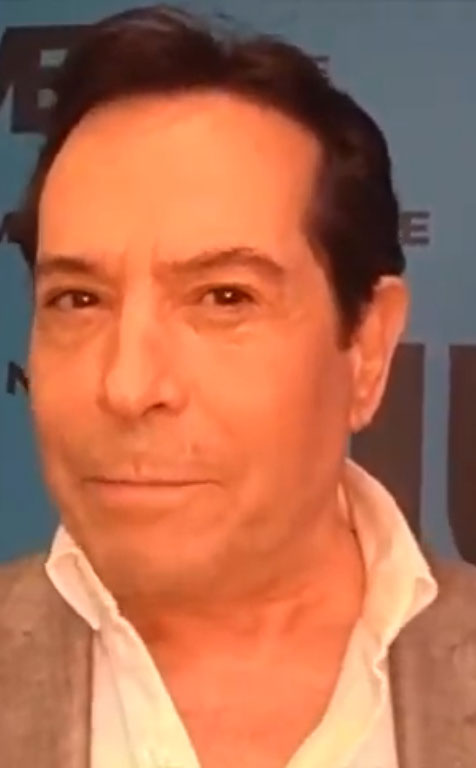
- Juan José Origel in 2019
- Born: Juan José Origel Padilla; September 14, 1947 (age 79); León, Guanajuato, Mexico
- Other name: Pepillo
- Occupations: Actor; Journalist; Television presenter; Television producer
- Years active: 1996–present

Juan José Origel Padilla (born 14 September 1947), known professionally as Pepillo Origel, is a Mexican television presenter, journalist, and actor. He made his acting debut in the telenovela Vivo por Elena, portraying "El Panameño". Origel has worked for both major Mexican television networks, TV Azteca and Televisa, and appeared in entertainment programs such as Ventaneando, La Oreja, and Hoy.

He currently co-hosts the show Con permiso with Martha Figueroa for Unicable.

== Biography ==
Origel began his journalism career in 1996 as part of a newspaper in New York City. He was invited by Pati Chapoy to join the newly launched TV Azteca entertainment program Ventaneando, where he worked alongside Martha Figueroa and Pedro Sola. He left the show in 1997 to move to rival network Televisa.

At Televisa, he hosted the entertainment program La botana, which aired for nearly a year. After its cancellation, he began Hacer y deshacer. In 2002, he became host of La Oreja, broadcast on Canal 9, remaining on the show until January 2009.

In 2013, he joined Hoy as part of the entertainment segment. In 2016, he launched his own program Hacen y deshacen for Unicable. He returned to Ventaneando in 2018 for the program's 22nd anniversary.

In June 2018, he joined the show Intrusos with Aurora Valle, Martha Figueroa and Maca Carriedo on Canal 9, which aired until June 2019. In the same year, he launched Con permiso on Unicable, where he continues to appear.

== Filmography ==
=== As actor ===
- 2017 – Hoy voy a cambiar: Himself
- 2016 – Por siempre Joan Sebastian: Presenter
- 2016 – Sueño de amor: Gonzalo Santillana
- 2013 – Amores verdaderos
- 2008–2009 – Un gancho al corazón: Gossipmonger
- 2009 – Verano de amor: Bruno Gallarza
- 2009 – Plaza Sésamo
- 2008–2009 – Mañana es para siempre: Gossipmonger
- 2007 – Amor sin maquillaje
- 2007 – Destilando amor: Gossipmonger
- 2006 – La fea más bella: Reporter
- 2006 – Mundo de fieras
- 2004 – Rebelde
- 2003 – Clase 406
- 2001 – Diseñador ambos sexos (episode "Rumores"): Himself
- 1999 – Rosalinda: Journalist
- 1998 – Derbez en cuando: "Espejo”
- 1998 – Vivo por Elena: El Panameño

=== As collaborator ===
- Todo para la mujer
- Vida y milagros
- Hablar por hablar
- Parodiando (2012–2013)

=== As presenter ===
- 2020 – Hoy (Wednesdays)
- 2018–present – Con permiso
- 2018–2019 – Intrusos
- 2016–2018 – Hacen y deshacen
- 2006–2016 – Derecho de admisión
- 2013–2015 – Hoy
- 2002–2009 – La Oreja
- 2001 – Trapitos al sol
- 1997 – Hacer y deshacer
- 1997 – La botana
- 1996 – Ventaneando

=== As producer ===
- 2006 – Derecho de admisión

=== Guest appearances ===
- 2009 – 100 mexicanos dijeron
- 2004 – La Parodia
- 2004 – Big Brother VIP (México)
- 2004 – El show de Cristina
- 2000, 2006 – Teletón (México)
