= Desde Gayola =

Mexican television series

- Also known as: Nocturninos presenta: Desde Gayola (2008–present)
- Created by: Horacio Villalobos
- Written by: Horacio Villalobos
- Directed by: Horacio Villalobos (2002–2013); Andreas Pears (2002–2006); Carmen Huete (2008–2009)
- Starring: See Desde Gayola cast members
- Narrated by: Horacio Villalobos (2001–present); Daniel Vives "Ego" (2008–present); Carlos Rangel (2008–present)
- Country of origin: Mexico
- Original language: Spanish
- No. of seasons: 5
- No. of episodes: Over 800

Production
- Executive producers: Horacio Villalobos (2001–present)
- Producers: Horacio Villalobos; Sergio Skvirski
- Running time: 60 minutes (including commercials)
- Production companies: Telehit (2001–2006); 52MX (MVS Comunicaciones) (2008–2013)

Original release
- Network: MVS Comunicaciones
- Release: February 2002 – January 2013

Related
- Válvula de Escape; Nocturninos; Farándula 40

Desde Gayola (transl. From Nosebleed Section) is a Mexican LGBT-related late-night sketch comedy variety show created by Horacio Villalobos. The show premiered on Telehit in February 2002 as a sketch into the variety show Válvula de Escape. The show revolves around a series of parodies about Mexican culture, sexuality and politics, performed by a large and varying cast of repertory and newer cast members.

The TV show followed a format similar to Saturday Night Live with each episode approximately 25 minutes in length and containing an average of five sketches per episode. The show featured a cast and crew that included several gay, transgender, and drag queen performers.

== Name origin ==
In Mexican Spanish, gayola refers to the uppermost section of a theater, where the cheapest tickets are sold and the view is obstructed. It is comparable to the English term "the nosebleed section"—seats that are so high and far from the stage that they offer a less-than-ideal experience.

Interestingly, as Villalobos explains, "La Gayola" was originally the area where theater critics sat to evaluate performances. For us, Desde Gayola symbolizes that same critical vantage point—a place from which we analyze and critique political, social, religious, and entertainment realities.

== Format ==
The format of the show was inspired by the American TV show Saturday Night Live of NBC. The cast includes actors of diverse gender identities.

== Telehit ==
The show began airing in November 2001 as a sketch on the Válvula de Escape show, hosted and produced by Horacio Villalobos on Telehit. Since February 2002, the show was scheduled for the Friday at 3:00 pm slot.

In its firsts seasons, from 2002 to 2003, the show had a more modest list of characters, highlighting the transgender actress Alejandra Bogue, transgender actress Daniel Vives "Ego", Dario T. Pie and Francis García, as well Villalobos himself. Since 2003, more actors began to be integrated into more sketches, highlighting Carlos Rangel "La Maniguis", Gerardo Gallardo, Javier Yepes, Mauricio Barcelata, Miguel Romero and others.

The musical opening was Dulce Amor by Ana Martín, extracted from the Mexican telenovela Gabriel y Gabriela. Horacio Villalobos welcomed the audience and presented the sketches of the program. These sketches, of some which stood out were Tesoreando con La Tesorito, La Roña, Las Aventuras de La Supermana, El Mundo de Maniguis, Las Chicas V.I.P., Panal-Gastronómico, La Charla Ecclesiastica, Joterías con Ligia, Mirosnada, una historia real, El Rincón de Pita Amor, TVChurros, Las Aventuras de Dieguito Gardel Lamarque, Las Menopausicas and others.

From one sketch to another, a curtain of characters from the show dancing to the rhythms like Shortcut To The End, by Quartz and Lady Marmalade from Labelle appear. Each episode lasted 27 minutes and had about 5 sketches.

=== Out of Telehit ===
On August 3, 2006, Horacio Villalobos and the cast left Telehit, in protest at what they called "abuse and mistreatment."

In 2006, the cast received a proposal for the series on a transnational network television, but that plan fell through.

== 52MX ==
=== Nocturninos and Nocturninos presents: Desde Gayola ===
After leaving Telehit in 2006, the cast of Desde Gayola returned to television on August 4, 2008, this time on Channel 52MX from MVS Comunicaciones. Two programs are presented:

Nocturninos: A broadcast from Monday to Thursday at 11:00 pm. A night magazine-style program is led by Horacio Villalobos, Alejandra Ley, Paula Sanchez, Anibal Santiago and Memo Martinez, accompanied by La Súpermana (Daniel Vives "Ego"), Carlos Rangel (La Manigüis), Mario Lafontaine, Cheryl Sue, Rose Mary, La Veros (Pilar Boliver) and Mama Mela (Javier Yepez). In this section, they address issues related to current politics, sexuality, sports and entertainment with a touch of humor, sarcasm and satire.

Desde Gayola returned to television on August 4, 2008, exactly two years after its departure from Telehit. The fifth season lasted on the air almost fifteen months. In this new production, 400 sketches were recorded that aired, uncensored, on Channel 52MX of MVS Comunicaciones. They presented classic sketches such as: Las Aventuras de la Manigüis, La Súpermana, La Charla Eclesiastica, Las V.I.P., Panal-Gastronomico, El Rincón de Pita Amor, Joterías con Ligia, Las Menopausicas, Mirosnada, una historia real, Reflexiones profundas con Kakokeko, Las Aventuras de Dieguito Gardel Lamarque, TVChurros and more.

New sketches appeared such as Mala Nacha Sí, Yoga Ñonga, Michelle O., Cuarto Redondo and Piensa Patito.

Desde Gayola tentatively returned with a new season in the spring of 2012.

Desde Gayola: The Movie was planned, with the synopsis of a script and despite having the financing, investors stopped the project in hopes that the Treasury Department of Mexico would validate the amendments to the Law of Cinematography that would allow them to deduct the 10% tax by investing in film making.

=== Out of MVS ===
As of January 31, 2013, Desde Gayola stopped being broadcast through 52MX after the departure of the Nocturninos program from the TV Network, apparently, decision made by the directors. Several speculations emerged on the causes of its departure, including repression and censorship, but it ran simply because the program does not sell advertising.

== Sketches ==
- El Mundo de Maniguis / Las Aventuras de La Maniguis (The Maniguis World/Adventures of La Maniguis): This is the story of Juanito Maniguis, a "Gay stereotype", but not a negative image of gay people. La Manigüis and his friends (Christian, Vanessa, Jocelyn, La Pekelú, Giovanny and Ruben/Ruby) are often used to show the constant abuses that sexual minorities suffer in Latin American societies. La Manigüis also participates in the segment TVChurros.
- La Supermana (She-Superman): A transgender superhero who saves the lives of women who have had a bad fate. The mom/dad/chimera of La Supermana: La Super Madrota recurrently appears.
- La Charla Ecclesiastica (The Ecclesiastical Talk): In this segment Monsignor Roberto Rivera Melo (inspired by the Cardinal Primate of Mexico, Norberto Rivera Carrera), a leader of the Catholic Church, and Mrs. Carmela Rico, La Mama Mela, discuss matters of religion. In most segments, Mama Mela always takes one drink and gets drunk, contradicting the words of Rivera Melo, revealing her double standards.
- Panal-Gastronomico (Honeycomb Gourmet): The Chef Ornica is a chef who is always drunk and gives vulgar recipes. Sometimes the Panal-Gastronomico has become the "dictionary of the chef", where instead of a menu, he gives the definition of a word with double meaning.
- Las Chicas V.I.P. (The V.I.P. Girls): Ximena and Montserrat are two rich girls who are quite ignorant, silly, gossipy and self-centered, and are used to criticize the wealthy and powerful societies in Latin America.
- El Rincón de Pita Amor (Pita Amor Lounge): Pita Amor (inspired by the legendary Mexican poet Pita Amor) is a poet living alone who is self-centered and rude, and who has a set of values and constantly expresses his political views but betrays them when it suits him.
- Joterías con Ligia (Joterías with Ligia): Points out the different types of "jotita" (a word disparagingly used to call gays in Mexico) that people are according to their habits or attitudes, regardless of their sexual orientation. The sketch always ends with his "mana-greeting", which has become very popular in the series that goes like this: Mana, Santa, Reina, Adorada, idolatrada, de la vida, del amor, Muñeca, Puerca, Lagartona, Pollodrila, Culera, Guachaperra, Zorgatona.
- Mirosnada, una historia real (Mirosnada: A True Story): A young blind and innocent girl who is constantly in unpredictable and fun problem situations because of her disability. Mirosnada and her friend, Yólida Ivette, experience different professions, in most of which sight is an essential element, yet they are always victorious.
- Reflexiones profundas con Kakokeko (Deep Thoughts with Kakokeko): A sketch where Sergio Skvirsky "Kakokeko" says a very true reflection, fun and full of wisdom, which lasts less than a minute and usually comes last.
- Las Noticias (The News): Is an informative section from Desde Gayola's point of view. Horacio Villalobos and Adela Macho (formerly Luis Otero) lead the sketch under the slogan: "This was the news and these were the news, even if you do not want it."
- Animo: The first television program for the prevention and treatment of addiction, with their old friends Juan Sonsorio, Carmen Campo Santo and Lupita D'Arressio. "We three are already rehabilitated." "But tomorrow we start rehabilitation" and "Drugs destroy and you deserve to live" are the most common phrases in each chapter of these three drug lovers.
- Las Menopausicas (Postmenopausal Women): Four women in the age of menopause (Luchis, La Chata, Yoyis and Menchu) discuss issues from their very particular view of life.
- TVChurros: A critical reflection on tabloid journalism in Mexico, the series follows the editorial staff of gossip magazine TVChurros. The main characters include Gustavito, a photographer with an intellectual disability; La Manigüis, a stereotypical gay journalist; Rosita, nicknamed the "Good Girl"; and Matilde Gallegos, the strict news chief. The sketch parodies magazines such as TVyNovelas and TVNotas.
- Cuarto Redondo (Round Room): This segment is the story of Yólida Ivette (a makeup artist in the morning, a nurse at night and a full-time prostitute) and her family (The Great Grandfather, the Grandmother Mrs. Cruz, The Mother Mrs. Chely, the brother Christopher, the sister La Nena, Don Florencio and the nosy neighbor Mrs. Tura), who experience very difficult and compromising situations but always move forward because "The family is the only thing that matters ... Viva la familia!" This sketch criticizes the negative values and the double standards of dysfunctional family members in Latin American countries.
- Michelle O.: A parody of the First Lady of the United States Michelle Obama, which addresses issues of unilateral relations, with some sarcasm about immigrants.
- Mala Noche ¡Sí! (Bad Night Yes!): A TV show hosted by La Veros Castro, her broadcasts are dressed up as "long tablecloths" with guest artists, bothered most of the time by the commentator Rosa Salvaje, who talks about her personal life, sends greetings and "Many Kisses" to her colleagues from her former TV-home Televisa, and displays her ignorance and bad pronunciation using the phrase "Did I say it right?", sparking comic situations among bickering. La Veros adores to spill the beans out of her guests and "As the Time is the enemy of television", La Veros says goodbye on her segment.
- Piensa Patito (Think Patito): A parody of the protagonist from the Patito Feo soap opera. Patito is a supposedly innocent and sweet girl, but without any kind of education and an apparent lack of values.
- Las Aventuras de Dieguito Gardel Lamarque (The Adventures of Dieguito Gardel Lamarque): An Argentine actor who travels to Mexico to find a career opportunity, his problem is that he is very egocentric, vain, untalented, unintelligent and lacking many basic values. On many occasions, his mother Eva Gardel Lamarque, wins over Dieguito in the positions he seeks. The segment ends with the departure of Maurice Barcelata of Nocturninos in 2009.
- Sexo Seguro (Safe Sex): The sexologists Anabel Chochoa and Rina Rasquencen talk about sexuality in a humorous way full of double meaning. This sketch was suspended due to the death of the sexologist Anabel Ochoa (parodied in the segment) in 2008.
- Mujer... (Woman ...): A parody of the program Mujer, Casos de la Vida Real, led by Silvia Final (a parody of Silvia Pinal), where she reads and responds to the "hard" problems of housewives. This sketch did not appear in the new phase due to the death of Francis in 2008.
- Felíz Mañana (Happy Morning): A parody of Mexican Morning TV shows as Hoy and Venga La Alegría.
- Martita Según: A parody of the former First Lady of Mexico, Martha Sahagún de Fox, where she gave a series of comments in an harsh critique of Mexican politics. This sketch remained until the exit of the actress Raquel Pankowsky from the show in 2005.
- Tesoreando con La Tesorito (Tesoreando with La Tesorito): A parody of the singer and actress Laura León, a program where she interviews newsmakers personified by the show's cast, but has also resorted to royal guests, such as Ana Martín, Alaska and Edgar Vivar, among others. La Tesorito with her lack of culture, vulgarity and ignorance highlights the decadent television shows. This segment continued in the show until the exit of Alejandra Bogue in the spring of 2006.
- La Roña (The Scab): A parody of the deceased actress María Félix, who plays a La Roña and interviews real-world artists, which are almost always spontaneous. Dario T. Pie played the role since the beginning of the program until 2004, and he later returned in 2005.

== Cast members ==
=== Current members ===
- Horacio Villalobos (2002–2013)
- Carlos Rangel (2003–2013)
- Daniel Vives "Ego" (2002–2013)
- Javier Yepez (2004–2013)
- Pilar Boliver (2008–2013)
- Gerardo Gallardo (2002–2013)'
- Ligia Escalante (2003–2013)
- Claudia Silva (2002–2013)
- Paula Sanchez (2002–2013)
- Miguel Romero (2003–2013)
- Anabel Ferreira (2008–2013)
- Crystal (2002–2013)
- Julissa (2004–2013)
- Carmen Delgado (2004–2013)
- Cecilia Romo (2004–2013)
- Lupita Sandoval (2004–2013)
- Carmen Huete (2003–2013)
- Sergio Argueta (2005–2013)
- Rizo Verdy (2008–2013)
- Lisset (2003–2013)
- Sergio Ochoa (2008–2013)
- Sergio Skvirsky (2002–2013)

=== Former members ===
- Alejandra Bogue (2002–2006)
- Dario T. Pie (2002–2005)
- Francis García (RIP) (2002–2004)
- Raquel Pankowsky (2002–2005)
- Luis Otero (2002–2003)
- Ricardo Leal (2002–2002)
- Mauricio Barcelata (2003–2009)
- Ricardo Villarreal Guadiana (RIP) (2003–2005)
- Monica Noguera (2003)
- Maria Rubio (2004–2005)
- René Franco (2004–2005)
- Kristoff Raczynski (2005)
- Cecilia Gabriela (2004)
- Leonorilda Ochoa (2003)
- Carlos Bieletto (2002–2004)
- Carlos Bonavides (2002)
- Alan Estrada (2002)
- Laura de Ita (2002)
- Veronica Falcon (2003–2004)
- Lucinda Salcedo, "La Doctora" (RIP) (2003)
- Roberto Espejo (2004)
- Jorge Fratta (2004–2005)
- Fernanda Ostos (2005–2008)
- Luz María Meza (2004–2006)
- Alejandra Ley (2008–2009)

== Theatre ==
The program has also been extended by a series of plays that have been in different Mexican cities. It is a cabaret show with the TV characters, embroiled in totally different situations on which they comment facing the television. Its first theatrical show was called From Gayola: The Show (2002). Its second production (2003), Once upon a time Desde Gayola is a satire of fairy tales, adding to the irreverence of the television show. In the third production (2007), the concept evolves Desde Gayola presents Telebasura, a critique of television, politics and religion. Without mincing words, they equally destroy people from pseudo-journalists to corrupt politicians. Horacio Villalobos, La Maniguis, La Supermana, Mama Mela and Chef Ornica participate.
