= Alejandra Bogue =

Mexican actress, comedian, TV host, and producer

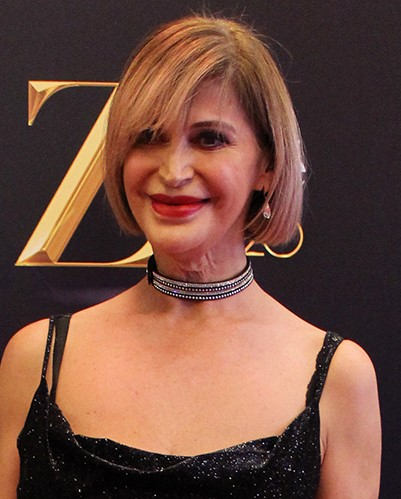
- Bogue in 2020
- Born: May 16, 1965 (age 60); Mexico City, Mexico
- Other names: La Bogue
- Occupations: Actress; vedette; TV Host; Model
- Years active: 1984–present

Alejandra Bogue Gómez (born May 16, 1965) is a Mexican actress, comedian, television host, and vedette.

== Biography ==
=== Early life ===
Bogue was born on May 16, 1965, in Mexico City, Mexico. She claims to have been aware of her feminine identity since childhood. She was raised by her mother and her grandmother and she attended Colegio del Tepeyac, a boys' school in Mexico City. During the performance of a school play, Bogue was able to portray a female character for the first time, which affirmed her artistic vocation and her gender identity. Later, she studied at the Liceo de México and at Colegio Decroly.

In the early 1980s, Bogue began to participate in shows where she performed impersonations of figures such as Annie Lennox, Nina Hagen, Cyndi Lauper and Madonna. At that time, Bogue met Mónica Alejandra Naná, a transgender woman, who served as her mentor. In 1984 she began working in drag shows at the Le Baron nightclub, in the south of Mexico City. In 1985, Bogue participated in the contest Valores Juveniles del Travestismo, obtaining first place. In that same year, Bogue moved to Acapulco where she was part of the drag show that was represented at the Gallery nightclub. It was around this time that she began her transition to become Alejandra. In 1988, she returned to Mexico City, joining the Kitsch Company, a theatrical company that presented cabaret shows in the famous nightclub known as 9, located in the Zona Rosa of Mexico City.

Bogue continued with her facet as a model and came to pose for the lens of photographers such as Adolfo Pérez Butrón and Armando Cristeto. In that facet of her career, Bogue appeared in the Mexican versions of Vogue and Elle.

=== Career ===
In 1990, while Bogue was working as a host at the Bugambilia nightclub in Mexico City, photographer Adolfo Pérez Butrón recommended her to American photographer Joel-Peter Witkin. The resulting photograph was titled Man with a Dog. In 1992, Bogue posed for the second time for Witkin in the photograph Three Kinds of Woman.

In 1991, Bogue made her debut as actress in the play Baal by Bertolt Brecht. Bogue immersed herself in the theater for the rest of the 1990s. In 1993, she participated in Mishima, directed by Abraham Oceransky. In 1994, Bogue joined La Fábrica, a theater group founded by Rosario Armenta. Bogue also entered the ballet school of the dancer Mercedes Limón.

In 1998 she acted in the play The Maids, by Jean Genet, under the direction of Adriana Roel, together with Patricia Reyes Spíndola and Pilar Pellicer. Thanks to her participation in this montage, Bogue won the prize as Female Revelation from the AMCT (Mexican Association of Theater Critics). In 1999 she starred in the play Dos Gardenias, where she was directed by Reyes Spíndola.

In the 1990s, Bogue also entered the world of performance accompanying the musician DJ. Chrysler. She participated with Chrysler in several performances, including the opening act of a David Bowie concert in Mexico City in 1997.

Between 2000 and 2002, Bogue participated in the cabaret drag queen show El show de las Hermanas Vampiro. In 2001, Bogue began to collaborate with the television host Horacio Villalobos on the TV Show Válvula de escape, on the Telehit music channel, owned by the Televisa Network. In that same year, Bogue performed a small role in the film Frida, a Hollywood production, directed by Julie Taymor and starring Salma Hayek.

In 2002, Bogue joined Desde Gayola, a comedy TV show created by Villalobos. In this television show, Bogue gained great popularity by playing the characters of La Tesorito (a parody of the Mexican actress and singer Laura León), Tearruina Fernández (parody of the Mexican television host Talina Fernández), and Sonia Infame (parody of the Mexican actress Sonia Infante), among others. At the same time, Bogue held the position of Costume Coordinator for Telehit. Desde Gayola also toured the country with cabaret shows. Bogue participated in Desde Gayola: El Show, between 2003 and 2004, and Había una Vez...Desde Gayola, between 2005 and 2006.

Bogue also acted in two chapters of the anthology television show Mujer, Casos de la Vida Real produced by Silvia Pinal for Televisa (2002 and 2004). Parallel to her work on television, in 2003 Bogue starred in the comic film Sin ton ni Sonia, by Carlos Sama.

At the beginning of 2006, Bogue left Desde Gayola. At the end of the same year, Bogue joined Guau!, a television show broadcast by Telehit and focused on issues of the LGBT community. In that same year, Bogue returned to the theater with the show of cabaret No soy Madonna, pero soy La Bogue, a kind of biographical monologue to the rhythm of Madonna's greatest musical hits.

In 2008, Bogue got the opportunity to present her first television show: Que show con Alejandra Bogue, through the Telehit signal. Bogue served as the show's producer and creative. The show was a comedy show in which Bogue sang, danced, did impersonations, conducted interviews, and performed comedy skits. Among the characters that Bogue created for her sketches are Betty BO5 (representation of an actress in decline, with alcoholism and drug addiction problems); Wendy Citlally (makeup artist whose Bible are the gossip magazines), Matalina Vil (parody of the character Catalina Creel from the Mexican telenovela Cuna de lobos), and La Madrota (portrait of an alcoholic and decadent sex worker). El The show ran for four seasons, spanning six years. The show is the first television program to be fully starred by a transgender woman in Latin America.

In 2010, Bogue was selected to be part of the Mexican theatrical version of the film Todo sobre mi madre by Pedro Almodóvar, with the character of La Agrado (played in the film by the Spanish actress Antonia San Juan). The play premiered with great box office success at the Teatro de los Insurgentes in Mexico City on March 27, 2010. Thanks to her performance, Bogue won the award for best female co-performance by the APT (Association of Theater Journalists).

In 2012, Bogue was invited to be part of the transgender panel at the Global Cross Atlantic Summit, organized by Equality Milan and The Harvey Milk Foundation in Italy.

In 2013 Bogue makes a special appearance in the films Tercera Llamada, by Francisco Franco and Instructions Not Included, directed by and starring Eugenio Derbez. In 2014, the actress joined various theatrical productions of the projects Microteatros and Teatro en Corto in Mexico City. In that year, she also acted in some chapters of the webnovela Ana la chica bolera, by Eduardo Solo. In 2015, the actress participated in the Mexican telenovela Amor de barrio, produced by Televisa.

In 2016, Bogue posed for the third time for photographer Joel-Peter Witkin, twenty-five years after she first posed for his lens. The photograph was titled The Soul Has No Gender. In 2017, Bogue's photographs for Witkin were part of Trisha Ziff's book and documentary Witkin & Witkin.

In 2017, Bogue starring the play Zuleyka Montes, directed by Gustavo Sanders. In that same year, she became the host of the online LGBT content and comedy show Diva divergente. In 2018, Bogue entered the world of television dubbing by giving voice to a character in the Latin American version of the American television series Pose, broadcast on Fox Premium. In 2019, Bogue participated in the film El viaje de Keta, directed by Julio Bekhor.

In early 2020, Bogue released a series of capsules and content through her official YouTube account. The content is divided into two spaces: Confesiones de Madame, where Bogue and her characters talk about the experiences lived by Bogue throughout her life and career, and La Bogue en Vivo, a real-time broadcast where Bogue talks to the audience, introduces her characters, and introduces occasional guests. The content was produced by the plastic and visual artist Manu Mojito and Bogue herself. In May 2020, Bogue, in collaboration with Manu Mojito, launched the website alejandrabogue.com.

In 2021, Bogue participated in the telenovela ¿Te acuerdas de mí?, produced by Televisa. In the same year, Bogue was one of the LGBT personalities honored with a cover in the Mexican edition of the Elle magazine.

On June 10th 2024 it was announced on the official Instagram for the non-replica Mexican production of Priscilla, Queen of the Dessert that Bogue would return to the stage playing the role of Bernadette, alternating with trans actress Roshell Terranova

== Filmography ==
=== Film ===
Year	Title	Role	Notes
1994	Money Shot	Hot Line girl	Short film
1996	El Amor de tu vida S.A.		
2001	Seres humanos	Rony	
2002	Frida	Party guest	
2003	Casting...busco fama	Herself	Short film
2004	Popis	Friend	Short film
2004	Sin ton ni Sonia	Cuerva	
2005	Acapulco Golden	Rosalinda Mami Lu	
2008	Nesio	Trans woman	
2009	La despedida de Eugenio	Camila	
2013	Tercera llamada	Actress	
2013	Instructions Not Included	Casting model	
2017	Witkin & Witkin	Herself	Documentary film
2019	El viaje de Keta	La Pecadora	

=== Television ===
==== Actress ====
Year	Title	Role	Notes
2001	Amigas y rivales	Party guest	1 episode
2002-2006	Desde Gayola	La Tesorito / Tearruina Fernández / Sonia Infame	Main role
2002-2004	Mujer, Casos de la Vida Real	Fatima / Miranda	Episodes: "Fatima" / "Año Nuevo, Vida nueva"
2008-2014	Que show con Alejandra Bogue	Betty Bo5 / Wendy Citlali / Matalina Vil / La Madrota / Marie Anette du LaColette	Main role
2012	Hoy soy nadie	Becca Lima	Main role
2013	Todo incluido	Trans woman	1 episode
2015	Amor de barrio	Kitzia Ariana	Main role
2018	Alaska y Mario	Herself	Episode: "Huracán final"
2018	Amar a muerte	Sex worker	1 episode
2018-2019	Pose	Ms. Orlando	2 episodes (Voice in Latin American dubbing)
2019	Lorenza	Ale	1 episode
2019	Se rentan cuartos	Cruela Glamour	Episode: "Cruela Glamour"
2021	¿Te acuerdas de mí?	Gladys	Main role
2021	Mi querida herencia	Extravaganza	1 episode
2021	Esta historia me suena	Chave	1 episode
2023	Drag Race México	Herself	Guest judge; Episode: "Girl Band"
2023	Wendy, perdida pero famosa	Herself	Episode: "Transpower con La Bogue"

==== Host ====
Year	Title	Role	Notes
2001-2006	Válvula de escape	Herself / María de las Bogues del Perpetuo Burdel	
2006-2008	Guau!	Host	
2009	There's Something About Miriam	Host	Latin America

=== Stage credits ===
- Muxe (2020)
- Disco 54 (2019)
- Mala Burlesque Show (2019)
- Grinder: El Show (2018)
- Zuleyka Montes (2017)
- Conejo blanco, conejo rojo (2016)
- Legalmente perra (2016)
- El viaje de una estrella (2016)
- Quiero ser una chica Almodóvar (2015)
- AmorAtados (2015)
- Por un shampoo (2014)
- Sinfonía de un recuerdo en el ropero (2014)
- En vivo, en puntas con la Bogue (2011)
- Todo sobre mi madre (2010)
- Pachecas a Belén (2007)
- No soy Madonna, pero soy la Bogue (2006-2008)
- Había una vez: Desde Gayola. Foro Living / Mascabrothers show center (2005 - 2006)
- Desde Gayola, El show. Foro Living (2003 - 2004)
- Yo fui una chica Almodóvar (2003)
- Cinderella (2002)
- El show de las hermanas Vampiro (2000-2002)
- Dos Gardenias (1999)
- The Maids (1998)
- Cuando la higuera reverdezca (1997)
- Danzas Efímeras (1997)
- Proyecto Cancún (1997)
- Elegía para las almas ausentes (1996)
- Nocturno grito (1996)
- Bajo el sigilo de la Luna (1996)
- Divertidus Generación 2000 (1996)
- Ocurrencias de hoy (1995)
- Actos de fé para los mirones (1995)
- Un viaje para Nítida (1995)
- Ángeles de hoy (1994)
- La Fábrica (1994)
- Cuaderno de amor y desamor (1993)
- Mishima (1993)
- Las Ruinas de Bernarda Alba (1992)
- 15 000 Voltas, versión pantimedia (1991)
- Baal (1991)

=== Web ===
- Ana la chica bolera (2014) - Beba Urdapilleta
- Diva Divergente (2017) - Herself / Betty BO5 / Wendy Citlali / La Madrota / Beverly Owen
- Confesiones de Madame / Viva La Bogue en Vivo (2020) - Herself / Betty BO5 / Wendy Citlali / La Madrota / Beverly Owen / Talina Preciosa / La Treshur
- NosoTrans (2020)

== Bibliography ==
- Alaska (2003) Transgresoras, Spain, Ediciones Martínez Roca, S.A., ISBN 84-270-2977-2
- Osorno, Guillermo (2014) Tengo que morir todas las noches, México, Ed. Debate, ISBN 9786073122689
- Ziff, Trisha (2016) Witkin & Witkin, México, Ed. Trilce Ediciones, ISBN 978-6078460052
- Donnadieu, Henry (2019) La noche soy yo, México, Ed. Planeta, ISBN 9786070758386
