= Silvia Olmedo =

Spanish TV psychologist and author

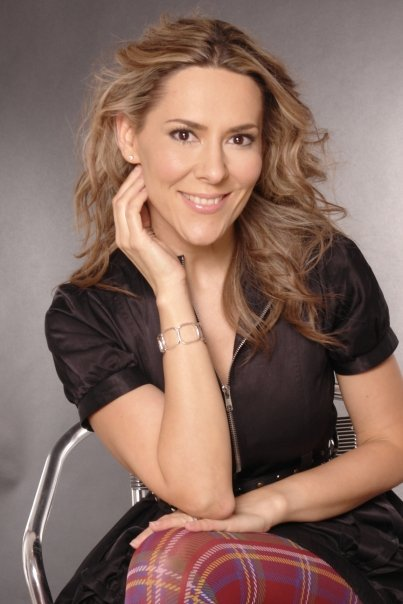
- Born: Silvia Olmedo; 16 May 1976 (age 50); Madrid, Spain
- Occupations: Psychologist, television host, writer, lecturer
- Website: http://silviaolmedo.com

Silvia Olmedo (born 16 May 1976) is a Spanish psychologist, sexologist, television host, producer and author. Considered one of the most influential psychologists in Spanish and on Latin television, she has worked in Spain, America, Britain, Netherlands, Australia and Mexico, where she currently hosts a television program named Terapia de Shock focused on educating people on psychology, sexology and health habits.

Silvia has written five books about psychology, in which she talks about relationships, sexuality, anxiety and self-esteem – Pregúntale a Silvia…Los secretos de Eva (Ask Silvia…Eve's secrets), Los misterios del amor y el sexo (The Mysteries of Love and Sex), Mis sentimientos erróneos, Detox Emocional and A dos pasos de la locura (Two steps from Madness). All of them became bestsellers, with more than 150,000 copies sold.

Besides her work as a television content producer and host, she's also dedicated to research in health and mental issues. Silvia is member of the editorial board of Women's Health magazine. She collaborates with NGOs such as México Vivo for education and HIV prevention and is part of the steering committee of Vive Consciente. She is also a well-known lecturer.

== Career ==
Silvia Olmedo is a content producer and host since 2006. She started at Telelehit with Cuentamelove. She also appears regularly in programs like Hoy, Despierta América and Netas Divinas. She has also been invited to Primero Noticias, Sábado Gigante, Showbiz (CNNEspañol) or Amigas y Conocidas (TVE), among many others. She has been a special collaborator in publications such as Publimetro, Huffington Post or Glamour México.

Silvia has written five books about love, sex, self-esteem and emotions. They are titled "Pregúntale a Silvia…Los secretos de Eva" (Aguilar, 2009), "Los misterios del amor y el sexo" (Aguilar, 2010), "Mis sentimientos erróneos" (Aguilar, 2014) and "Detox emocional (Saca de tu vida lo que te hace infeliz)" (Days of Today, 2016) ando "A dos pasos de la locura" (Aguilar, 2018). All her books have been best sellers, all of them with more than 4 reprints and an initial output of 20,000 copies. She has presented her books at important fairs such as The International Book Fair of Guadalajara, The International Book Fair of Palacio de la Minería, and the Spanish Book Fair in Los Angeles.

In addition to her work in television, Silvia is dedicated to research on physical, mental and emotional health issues. She was a member of the editorial board of Women's Health magazine, collaborates with various NGOs such as Mexico Vivo for HIV education and prevention and belongs to the Vive Consciente steering committee that fights against cervical cancer and the human papillomavirus. She is also a recognized lecturer.

In May 2019, the program "La tercera en discordia" was premiered in Unicable, it is an original idea of Silvia Olmedo, produced by Alexis Núñez Oliva and presented by Rocío Sánchez Azuara, which will address current social issues.

In Spain he has collaborated for various media such as LOS40, Cadena Dial, Elle, Enfemenino or El País.

== Television shows ==
- Terapia de Shock, 2019 - today. Unicable. Televisa Networks
- Mindsex, 2018. Unicable, Televisa Networks.
- Amordidas 2013 – 2018 Unicable, Televisa Networks
- Cuentamelove 2007 - 2014 Telehit, Televisa Networks
- Sexo Consentido. 2009 - 2011 Telehit, Televisa Networks
- Sexo con Kristoff 2006 - 2009 Telehit, Televisa Networks
- Picnic. 2004-2006 - Telehit, Televisa Networks,

== Radio ==
- Íntimamente. 2012 MVS 102.5 FM Mexico city.

== Books ==
  - Pregúntale a Silvia…Los secretos de Eva (Ask Silvia…Eve's secrets) (Aguilar, 2009)
  - Los misterios del amor y el sexo (The Mysteries of Love and Sex) (Aguilar, 2010)
  - Mis sentimientos erróneos (My Wrong Feeling) (Aguilar, 2014)
  - Detox emocional (Saca de tu vida lo que te hace infeliz) (Días de Hoy, 2016)
  - A dos pasos de la locura (Two steps of Madness) (Aguilar, 2018)

== Honors ==
In November 2010, Silvia Olmedo was awarded in Los Angeles, CA by Premios Libertad and One Love Foundation; winning the categories of Most Popular TV Show for Cuentamelove and Most Popular Informative TV Show Host.

In 2012 One of the Year (For her work on health promotion and psychology by the Women Mexican Chamber of Commerce)

Named Health Ambassador in Social Networks by Mexico's Ministry of Health.
