= Nahum B. Zenil =

Mexican artist (born 1947)

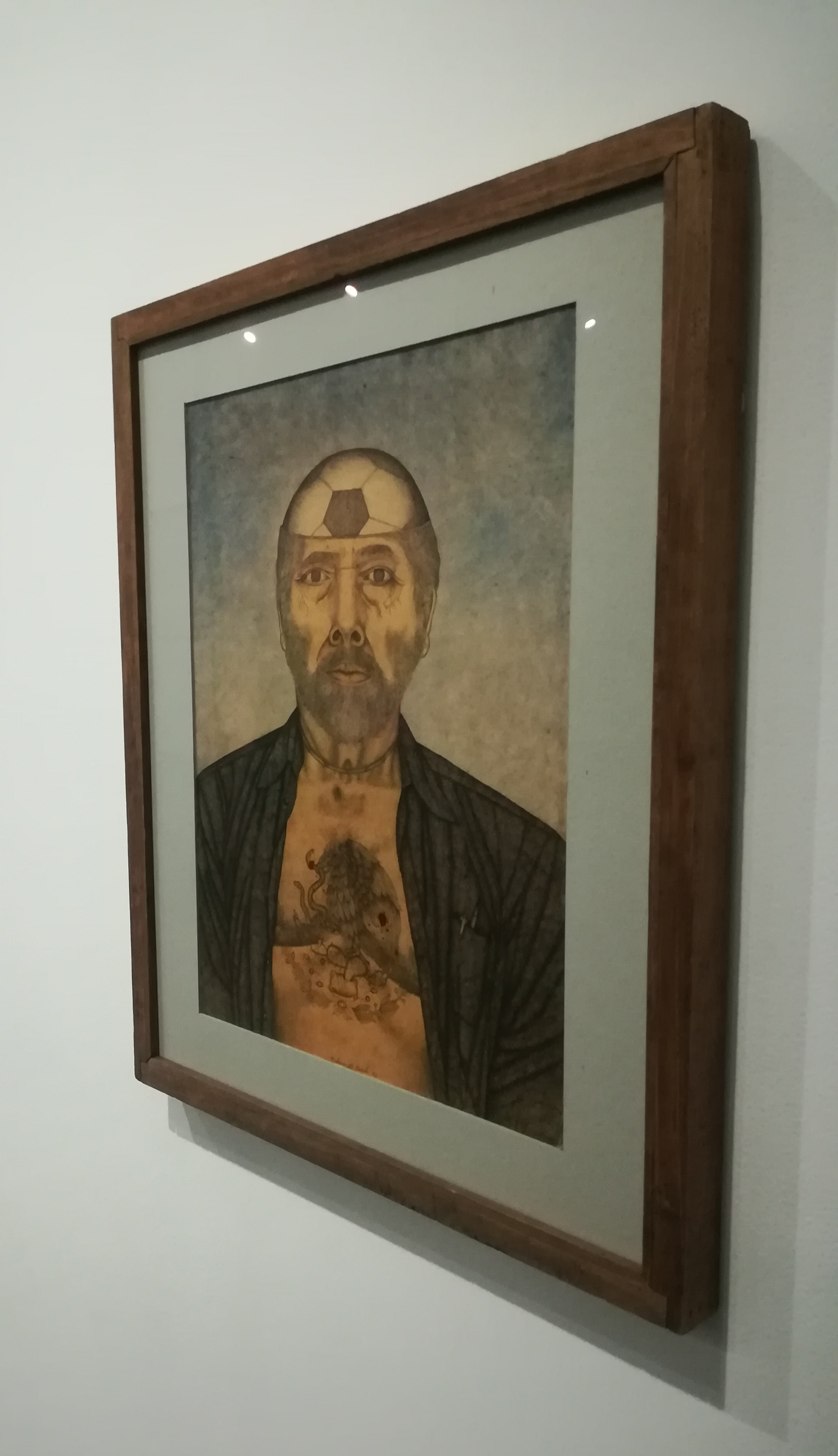
Fanático (2022), self-portrait

Nahum B. Zenil is a Mexican artist who often uses his own self-portrait as the principal model for a cultural critical interpretation of Mexico, especially concerning homosexuality and mestization. Zenil was born in 1947 in the state of Veracruz. In 1959, he enrolled at the Escuela Nacional de Maestros (National Teachers' School) in Mexico City, from which he graduated in 1964. It was during this period in which Zenil became interested in painting. He later entered the Escuela Nacional de Pintura y Escultura (known as La Esmeralda) in Mexico City in 1968. He is also one of the founding members of the Semana Cultural Gay ("Cultural Gay Week"), which occurs yearly at the Museo Universitario del Chopo. His art is often compared to that of Frida Kahlo, in which the self becomes the principal object of their paintings letting the viewer discover the artists as individuals as well as the broader social and cultural contexts in which they lived through the medium of self-portraiture.

== Early life and education ==
Nahum B. Zenil was born in 1947 in Veracruz Mexico. Zenil had a rural upbringing and a lower middle-class lifestyle. Zenil lived with his mother and grandmother in the house that often appears in many of his paintings. The house, when displayed in Zenil's work, is very modest, showing only a small living room, one bedroom, and one bathroom. Zenil's father lived separately, and he worked as a teacher. This disconnection between his family would greatly inspire much of Zenil's later artworks. In Zenil's younger years, he attended La Esmeralda school. However, in 1959, Zenil enrolled at the Escuela Nacional de Maestros in Mexico City, where he study art, including; drawing, watercolor, collage, and montage.

== Career ==
After graduating in 1964, Zenil stayed in Mexico City, where he taught classes on many subjects from drawing to sports. Zen taught in schools in Mexico City for 20 years until he quit to become a full-time artist. In 1974, Zenil had his first solo exhibition in Mexico City. He continued to teach until 1982. Shortly before Zenil began his full-time career as an artist, he had a solo exhibition in 1980 at the Casa de Arte CREA, in Mexico City. In 1984, he was selected to be a part of a group exhibition of Mexican art in Gothemburg, Stockholm and London. His work to this day can still be viewed throughout Mexico, Europe, and America. Zenil also continues to work with and support artists who explore their sexualities throughout their own art.

== Work ==
Much of Zenil's works use mixed media on paper or oil on canvas. He preferred to paint on canvas until the materials compromised his health. He quickly returned to collaging on paper. He often uses his image to relieve pressures he felt as a child growing up homosexual in a small town and to comment on contemporary Mexican society. His works illustrate a duality between himself as an "other" and his relationship with the Catholic Church. Within Zenil's mixed media pieces he uses mainly himself as the subject. He pictures himself in his images with many religious figures such as the Virgin of Guadalupe. Within his images are many re-worked traditional Mexican forms like the retablo and ex-voto styles. Zenil was inspired by the works of artists such as Frida Kahlo and Jose Guadalupe Posada.

These influences can be seen in his works, Frida in My Heart and With All Respect, in which the artist actually used the image of Frida Kahlo in his paintings. According to the website glbtq archive, they state that "In a number of ways, Zenil has looked to the art of Frida Kahlo, with its strong dose of self-examination and criticism, as a beacon of inspiration. The portrait of Kahlo is sometimes incorporated into Zenil's works and he creates a lively dialogue between his own portrait and that of Kahlo, whose art has often been seen as representing the triumph of will over adversity." Zenil saw Frida art as a form of salvation, which he used to escape from his everyday life. Zenil's art allowed him to purge himself of the pressures he felt growing up gay, in a small town as a child. The pressures continued to follow him into his life in Mexico city, and as a teacher until he quit, to pursue his art full-time. Many of his works look at a variety of themes and relationships among race, religion, Mexican history, cultural designation, colonialism, male subjectivity and homosexuality.

== Exhibitions ==
=== SELECTED SOLO EXHIBITIONS ===
1997 Grey Art Gallery, New York University, New York

1996 The Mexican Museum, San Francisco

1994 Galeria de Art Mexicano, Mexico City

1992 Galeria de Art Mexicano, Mexico City

1991 Nahum B. Zenil...Presents, Museo de Arte Contemporaneo de Monterrey, Mexico

1990 Parallel Project: Los Angeles, San Antonio, Mary-Anne Martin Fine Art/New York

1988 Mary-Anne Martin Fine Art, New York

1985 Galeria de Arte Mexicano, Mexico City

1983 Galeria de la Secretaria de Hacienda Y Credito Publico, Mexico City

1982 Museo Carillo Gil, Mexico City

1980 Casa de Arte CREA, Mexico City

=== SELECTED GROUP EXHIBITIONS ===
1995 "Cartographies" traveling exhibition: Canada and US

1993 "Cien pintores mexicanos" Museo de Arte Contemporaneo de Monterrey

1992 "Artistas jovenes" Caracas, Museo de Arte Contemporaneo

1991 "Through the Paths of Echoes" traveling exhibition: US

1990 "Mexico: Out of the Profane" Contemporary Art Centre of South Australia, Adelaide

"Aspects of Contemporary Mexican Painting" The Americas Society, New York

1986 "Memento Mori" Centro Cultural/Arte Contemporaneo, Mexico City

1985 "Mexico: The New Generation" San Antonio Museum of Art, Texas

1984 "Mexican Art" Gothemburg, Stockholm, London

== Publications ==
Zenil, Nahum B., Edward J. Sullivan, and Clayton Kirking. Nahum B. Zenil: Witness to the Self = Testigo Del Ser. San Francisco: Mexican Museum, 1996. Print.

== Bibliography ==
Encyclopedia Copyright © 2015, Glbtq, Inc., Entry Copyright © 2002, Glbtq, Inc., and Reprinted Fr. Zenil, Nahum B. (born 1947) (n.d.): n. pag. Web.

"Nahum B. Zenil - Artworks, Bio & Shows on Artsy." Nahum B. Zenil - Artworks, Bio & Shows on Artsy. N.p., n.d. Web. 2 May 2016.

"Nahum B. Zenil: Witness to the Self." MIT List Visual Arts Center. N.p., 14 Apr. 2014. Web. 2 May 2016.

Zenil, Nahum B., Edward J. Sullivan, and Clayton Kirking. Nahum B. Zenil: Witness to the Self = Testigo Del Ser. San Francisco: Mexican Museum, 1996. Print.

"Zenil_bio.html." Zenil_bio.html. N.p., n.d. Web. 2 May 2016.
