= Alexis Núñez Oliva =

Mexican-Cuban television content creator

- Born: Alexis Núñez Oliva; December 26, 1965 (age 60); Havana, Cuba
- Education: Higher Institute of Art, Havana
- Occupation: Television producer

Alexis Núñez Oliva (born December 26, 1965, Havana) is a Mexican-Cuban television content creator, writer, and executive producer.

Núñez Oliva is known for producing television programs for Spanish-speaking audiences, including Hoy, Vida TV, Martha Susanna Talk Show, Hard and Direct, Se Vale, and Televisa Network.

== Early life and education ==
Núñez Oliva was born on December 26, 1965, in Havana, Cuba. He went to the Higher Institute of Arts, Havana, Cuba, in 1989 and studied filmmaking, radio, and cinema. Núñez Oliva graduated in 1992.

== Career ==
=== In Cuba ===
During his academic years, Núñez Oliva jointly worked for Cuba's press, radio, and Television. In 1989 he published the book De vuelta y vuelta, of humorous stories, in Havana, Cuba.

He hosted a talk show on current affairs, En Confianza, which was broadcast on Cuban Television in the early 1990s. Two years before he hosted the radio program Entre ocho y diez on Radio Ciudad de La Havana.

In 1990, he co-wrote with Jorge Luis Sanchez, Benito Amaro, and Felix de la Nuez a documentary, El Fanguito, highlighting several of Havana's poorest districts. He also participated in the workshops about telling a story conducted by Gabriel Garcia Marquez.

Together with Lizzette Vila, Jorge Puncheaux, Leticia Sánchez and Víctor Butari, Núñez Oliva created and launched the first weekly art and culture newscast on Cuban television in 1994, El Huron Azul.

=== In Mexico ===
Núñez Oliva first visited Mexico in 1989 for a year, during which he trained the staff at Radio Turquesa Cancun about organized programming as commercial radio FM was being introduced in the region.

After moving to Mexico City in 1994, Núñez Oliva worked for Reforma, La Cronica, and Diario La Jornada newspapers for a year.

In 1995, he produced the radio program De Musicos, Poetas, and Locos, for Radiopolis Televisa and then joined T.V. Azteca as a news producer.

In 1997 she met the vice president of production for Televisa Network, Jorge Eduardo Murguía, at the house of actor César Evora. Murguia invited Núñez Oliva to join his company, which he accepted that same year.

Núñez Oliva created and produced an entertainment T.V. show, Hoy (Today in English), which was aired on Channel 2, El Canal de las Estrellas, of Televisa in 1998. The program later became popular in Mexico and among the Spanish-speaking audience worldwide. In the same year, he directed Ritmoson Latino, a singing platform for Latin American singers for the urban genre.

In 1999, he founded Televisa Espectaculos with a team of reporters and cameramen. Then, the following year, Núñez Oliva was appointed as the general director the channel 4TV (now FORO TV), which became the first local channel in Mexico City.

He created the Proudly Latino Awards in 2004. It is an event for musical artists from the Spanish-speaking world in which award nominations, mentions and winners are based on public votes and the award is given to each artist in the country where is found. The prize is taken by a fan of the public chosen from among those who voted.

In 2012, Núñez Oliva became one of the Televisa advisors for Univision. The panel's motive was to increase the target audience of the programs through the rebranded TV network.

After two decades working at Televisa, he left the company in 2018 and then founded a content production company, 7 Emociones, the following year. As of 2019, Núñez Oliva manages 7 Emociones.

While working in Mexico, his management positions have included:

- Ritmoson Latino, General Director, 1999–2009 (Televisa)
- 4TV, General Director of Production, 2000–2002

== Personal life ==
Núñez Oliva is married to a journalist and anchor, Veronica Bastos. The couple has a daughter named Amanda.

== Television production ==
Program name	Year	Platform
Hoy	1998–1999	Televisa
Anything Goes	1999–2000	Televisa
Martha Susanna Talk Show	2000–2001	Televisa
Outside the Law	1997-1997	Televisa
Hard and Direct	1997–1999	Televisa
Vida TV	2001–2004	Televisa
La Oreja	2002–2009	Televisa
Great Musical	2003-2003	Televisa
With Everything	2004–2007	Televisa
Good Afternoon!	2006-2006	Televisa
Se Vale	2007–2012	Televisa
Que tarde tan padre	2008-2008	Televisa
Top 10	2008–2010	Televisa
TV Millions	2010–2011	Televisa
Sabadazo	2010–2016	Televisa
The 3rd in Discord	2018-2018	Televisa
The Quarantine	2020-2020	Televisa
Laura uncensored	2020–2022	Televisa
Who is lying	2021–2022	Televisa
Naked secrets	2022-2022	Televisa
This is already personal	2023-2023	Televisa

== Podcast production ==
Program name	Year	Platform
El potrero	2022–2023	Spotify, Apple, Amazon, Pandora
Hoy toca	2023-2023	Spotify, Apple, Amazon, Pandora

== Books ==
- Productor De Emociones

== See also ==
- Duro Y Directo
