= Pita Amor =

Mexican poet (1918–2000)

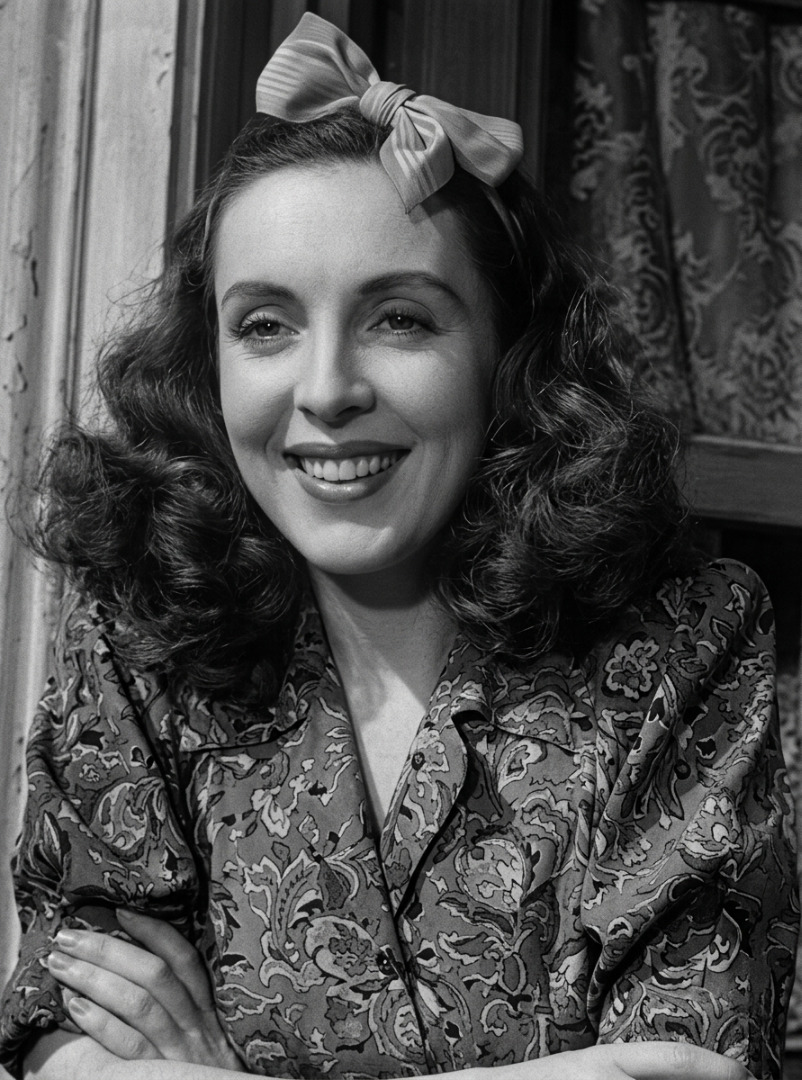
- Pita Amor in Tentación (1943)
- Born: May 30, 1918; Mexico City, Mexico
- Died: May 8, 2000 (aged 81); Mexico City, Mexico
- Occupation: Poet
- Children: Manuel (1959-1961)
- Relatives: Elena Poniatowska, Bernardo Sepúlveda Amor

Guadalupe Teresa Amor Schmidtlein (May 30, 1918 – May 8, 2000), who wrote as Pita Amor, was a Mexican poet.

== Biography ==
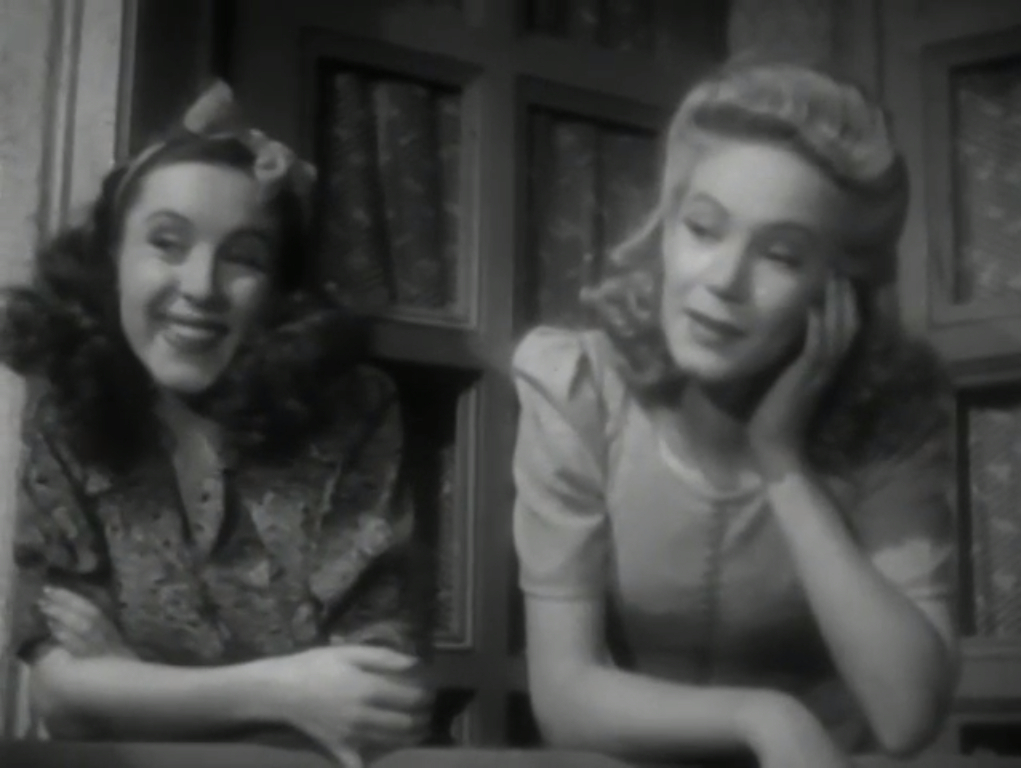
Amor with María Douglas (right) in Tentación (1943)

She was born in Mexico City, the youngest child of a family with seven children, of mixed French, German and Spanish ancestry, a member of the Mexican aristocracy. Her parents were Carolina Schmidtlein y García Teruel (of German and Spanish origin) and Emmanuel Amor Subervielle (of Spanish and French origin). Her family's financial woes after the revolution are narrated in Yo soy mi casa. Amor was exposed to art at an early age through her sister Ines, who ran a gallery in Mexico City.

Amor defied the Catholic customs of her time. Her love life was intense and varied, she was a single mother, and expressed her doubts about God in her poetry. During her youth, she was an actress and a model for famous photographers and painters such as Diego Rivera and Raúl Anguiano, who she posed for in the nude. She was a friend of José Clemente Orozco, David Alfaro Siqueiros, and María Félix.

Her poetry, influenced by Juana Inés de la Cruz ("The 10th Muse") and Francisco de Quevedo, is notable for its direct expressions about metaphysical issues stated in the first person.

Amor experienced tragedy that deeply marked her personal life and her work: the death of her son Manuel, who drowned at 19-months-old. Following his death was a long creative silence from Amor and marked her move away from public life.

The early 2000s saw a revival in Amor, particularly within the LGBT community, thanks to a parody character inspired by her in a late-night sketch comedy program called Desde Gayola. The recurring segment, in which her character played by the actor Miguel Romero, was named El Rincón de Pita Amor.

She was an aunt of the Mexican author Elena Poniatowska and Mexican diplomat Bernardo Sepúlveda Amor.

She died in Mexico City at the age of 81.

== Legacy ==
In her book "Mexico Revisited", Erna Fergusson called Pita "the very picture of a poet; many critics consider her Mexico's best woman poet, if not among the best of either sex or any era... her poems reflect a deep sincerity and a genuine seeking for truth."

Additionally, Michael Schuessler, head of the Latin American studies department at United States International University in Mexico City referred to Amor as "Mexico's greatest and most ignored poet of the first part of the 20th century".

Today, she is remembered as a forerunner of female sexual liberation in Mexico.

== Books ==
- Yo soy mi casa (1946), dedicated to her friend Gabriela Mistral
- Puerta obstinada (1947)
- Círculo de angustia (1948)
- Poesía (1948)
- Polvo (1949)
- Décimas a Dios (1953)
- Sirviéndole a Dios, de hoguera (1958)
- Todos los siglos del mundo (1959)
- Galería de Títeres (1959)
- Soy dueña del universo (1984)
- El Zoológico de Pita Amor (1975) dedicated to Rodolfo Chávez Parra
- Tan la tos (1945)
