= Francis García =

Mexican actress and designer (1958–2007)

Francis
- Born: José Francisco García Escalante; 6 April 1958; Campeche, Campeche, Mexico
- Died: 10 October 2007 (aged 49); Mexico City, Mexico

Francis García (born José Francisco García Escalante; 6 April 1958 – 10 October 2007), known by the artistic name "Francis", was a Mexican entertainer who was a famous actress, vedette and stage costume designer.

== Career ==
Born in Campeche, Campeche as Francisco Garcia Escalante, she first gained attention as a dancer in vedette shows, held at the famous "Blanquita" theater, some of which included a transvestites' ballet.

Her first mainstream breakthrough was in the said theater during the casting for a movie called "Bellas de noche" (1975) where she was given a role, resulting in her later getting her own show at the Blanquita called "Francis, la fantasia hecha mujer" ( Francis, the fantasy made woman ) which successfully ran for 17 years, she also performed in Los Angeles at the theater "Los Pinos", which was the home of her touring shows. She was an actress, comedian, singer, lip-syncher and choreographer/dancer.

During her theater and television shows, she impersonated famous Latin female singers such as Colombian Shakira, Spaniard Rocío Dúrcal and Mexicans Gloria Trevi, Alejandra Guzmán, and Lupita D'Alessio as well as doing stand-up comedy and Vegas-style dancing numbers.

Fashion designer Mitzi, a long-time friend, credits Garcia with helping him during his time of need and aiding in starting his design empire.

She was a public personality in Mexican showbiz and appeared in several movies, telenovelas, variety shows and broadcasts of her theater comedy shows, most notable was her stage persona as a female impersonator during a time when Mexican society was conservative social attitudes and homosexuality was considered a minor crime, she was the first openly gay celebrity in the country and an activist for equality and human and gay rights until her death. During her lifetime she was frequently questioned if she ever wanted to surgically become a woman, which she denied quoting religious beliefs and jokingly expressing that in today's society, she'd rather get surgery to make her penis bigger, as women are more popular with "something extra" down there...

She never had feminisation surgeries, she did however have rhinoplasty to help her achieve her famed Lupita D'Alessio characterization which was highly acclaimed.

== Death ==
Garcia died of a lung thrombosis in a Mexico City hospital on 10 October 2007. She was 49 years old.
