= Cotorreando =

American-Spanish-language television show

Cotorreando ("chatting" in Spanish) is a daily Spanish-language gossip television show that ran on the American-Spanish network Telemundo from 2000 to 2007.

== Show ==
Cotorreando was established to be in direct competition with Univision's El Gordo y la Flaca, which had been in production since 1998. It was produced in Miami, Florida. At first shown live at 4pm EST (and shown recorded at the same time on the West coast), the show's producers decided to broadcast it at 12pm, live on the East coast, and recorded on the West coast, where it would also be shown at 12pm. The change in time slot was because show producers thought that, by getting their daily dose of gossip at an earlier time, television viewers would be uninterested in watching their rival show.

The show has shed light on Hispanic show business scandals, and while many entertainers do not oppose the show (many have actually visited the set), others have objected to being interviewed on camera for Cotorreando. Presenter Luisa Fernanda was fired in June 2007 after an interview.

On September 28, 2007, Telemundo announced that it was cancelling Cotorreando, with the final episode airing on that day. Telemundo executives then decided to use the time slot for reruns of recent telenovelas.

== Production history ==
Executive Producer/Creator: Ricardo Garza

Associate Producers Mack Green, Erika Garza, David MacKenzie, Michael Marshall and Shirley Perry
