= Andrea Legarreta =

Mexican actress and television host

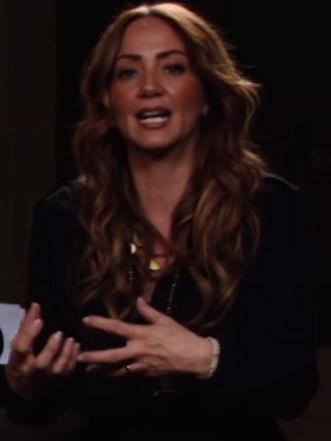
- Legarreta in 2016
- Born: Andrea Legarreta Martínez; 12 July 1971 (age 54); Texcoco, State of Mexico, Mexico
- Occupations: Actress, television Host
- Years active: 1989–present
- Spouse: Erik Rubín (m. 2000; sep. 2023)
- Children: 2

Andrea Legarreta Martínez (born 12 July 1971) is a Mexican actress and television host, she is best known as being one of the main hosts of the TV morning show Hoy.

== Biography ==
Andrea Legarreta Martínez began as a television commercial model at the age of 2.

At the age of 8, he began studying singing, dancing, and acting at Televisa's Center for Artistic Training and participated in unitary programs such as Nosotros los Gómez, Papá soltero, Tres Generaciones, Plaza Sésamo, and the telenovela Carrusel, among others.

At age 16, she joined the musical group Fresas con crema and began her career as a presenter on the program Música futura, while returning to telenovelas with Más allá del puente, Simplemente María, Alcanzar una Estrella, Muñecos de papel, Baila conmigo, La sombra del otro, No tengo madre, among many others.

In 1989, she began her film career in the Mexican film Grave Robbers alongside Fernando Almada, Erika Buenfil, and the first actor Roberto Cañedo. Ernesto Laguardia also participated in this film, who would later become her co-host on the program Hoy.

In 1993 she participated in the radio soap opera Vereda de espinas.

In 1995 Andrea Legarreta returned to hosting with the program Ombligo Club, and in 1996 she participated in Óscar Cadena's program, Cómplices en familia, along with Juan Carlos Nava "El Borrego" and Gaby Castro. In 1996 he hosted Tu Espacio de Expresión, Valores Bacardí y Compañía, a competition in which young people participate in the categories of performers, videos and posters. In 1997 she starred, along with Kate del Castillo, Héctor Soberón and the debuting Javier Gómez, in the film Educación sexual en breves lecciones), produced by Humberto Zurita and Christian Bach.

After participating in more than 10 telenovelas, in 1997 she decided to return to hosting at the invitation of journalist Guillermo Ochoa, on the program Hoy Mismo, which lasted 2 years; however, a new show arrived titled simply Hoy. This new program, in which she has been the main host for more than 20 years, gave her the opportunity to consolidate her career.

In 1998, Andrea Legarreta was interested in starring in the telenovela Tres mujeres as "Fátima Uriarte," but she declined and continued her hosting career.Years later, she made an appearance in the film La segunda noche. In 2000, she began Aquí Entre Dos, a new project to which she was invited by producer Carmen Armendáriz, and in which she again served as a host alongside Martha Carrillo. Simultaneously, she began the radio program La Chuchis y la Cuquis. Around the same time, Andrea Legarreta, along with Lilia Aragón and Pilar Boliver, joined the original cast of the stage production of The Vagina Monologues.

In 2002, she starred in the telenovela ¡Vivan los niños! alongside Eduardo Capetillo, playing the role of the kind-hearted teacher Lupita. Since the end of this telenovela, Andrea Legarreta has primarily focused on hosting television programs and has only made sporadic appearances in telenovelas with special guest roles.

She was married to the singer Erik Rubín, with whom she had two daughters.

== Filmography ==
=== Films ===
Year	Title	Role
1989	Ladrones de tumbas	Andrea
1997	Educación sexual en breves lecciones	Alejandra
1999	La segunda noche	Pharmacist
2019	Mamá se fue de viaje	Casandra
2019	Guadalupe Reyes	Herself

=== Television ===
Year	Title	Role
1989	Carousel	Aurelia
1989	Mi segunda madre	Denisse
1989	Simplemente María	Ivonne D'Angelle
1990	Alcanzar una estrella	Adriana
1991	Alcanzar una estrella II	Adriana
1992	Baila conmigo	Rebeca
1993	Valentina	Constanza "Connie" Basurto
1996	La sombra del otro	Marlena Gutiérrez
1996	Complices en familia	Host
1997	No tengo madre	Consuelito
1998	El noticiero con Guillermo Ortega Ruiz	Host
1998	Una luz en el camino	Ana
1998-2000, 2003–present	Hoy	Host
1999	Derbez en cuando	Guest
2000-2001	Aquí entre dos	Host
2002-2003	¡Vivan los niños!	Guadalupe "Lupita" Gómez
2003	Velo de novia	Reporter
2004	Amarte es mi pecado	TV host
2007	Sexo y otros secretos	Host of "Hoy, mañana y siempre"
2008	Mañana es para siempre	Reporter
2009	Me quiero enamorar	Host
2011	La fuerza del destino	Veronica Resendiz
2025	Amanecer	Julia
