= Horacio Villalobos =

Mexican TV host, and actor

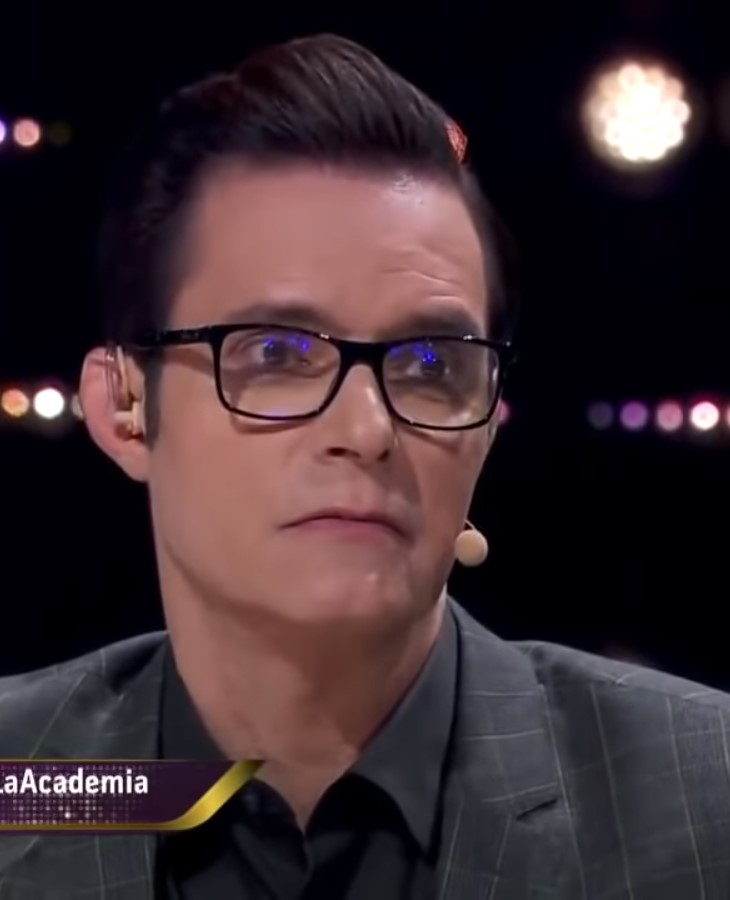
- in La Academia, 2020
- Born: Horacio Aquiles Villalobos Velasco; November 8, 1970 (age 55); Mexico City, Mexico

Horacio Aquiles Villalobos Velasco (born November 8, 1970) is a Mexican TV host and actor, who currently serves on the judging panel of the renowned Mexican reality musical talent TV series La Academia.

== Biography ==
Born in Mexico in 1970, he comes from a family of lawyers and politicians. Villalobos is of Indigenous Oaxacan and Spanish descent. He is the grandson of Antonio Villalobos, who was the attorney general for president Lazaro Cardenas. (Mexican attorney general for president Lázaro Cárdenas), studied theater in Oxford, England and Law at the National Autonomous University of Mexico.

His television career began with the news channel Noticias ECO and other Televisa shows like Gaceta Cultural, 6205 el Planeta, Entre Butacas, Trapitos al Sol and Operación Triunfo. His first project in Televisa's music channel Telehit was Malas Lenguas. He eventually got his own talk show: Válvula de Escape, which he hosted for ten years, from 1996 to 2006.

In 2001 he started his own comedy act Desde Gayola, which was a part of Válvula de Escape until the end of the show. Besides hosting it, he acted as Gustavito (an intellectually challenged gossip-magazine reporter) and Norberto Rivera Melo (a priest). He quit Telehit in August 2006, ending the run of these two shows. He claimed that the network was not giving the right traits for him and his workers at the show. Therefore, he toured the country with his theater show Había una Vez desde Gayola.

From 2008 to 2013, he hosted "Nocturninos", broadcast on MVS Canal 52. He included some of the cast of "Desde Gayola" and Alejandra Ley, Mauricio Barcelata, María José Suarez, Denisse Padilla and Agustín Cassanova as the first cast; Paula Sanchez, Guillermo Martínez y Anibal Santiago were part of the cast in later years.

Since 2011 to present day, he also hosts and produces Farándula 40, a hybrid between an entertainment news show with a late-night show, broadcast on ADN40. Villalobos hosts the show along Pilar Boliver and Mauricio Valle.

In 2017 and 2018 he has produced for Mexico the theater plays A Normal Heart and an Act of God. Also, he is the main host of the Mexican edition of Fashion Police broadcast on E! Mexico, and a judge in La Academia.

He was added to Venga La Alegría in 2020 as a contingency because the principal cast was at risk of COVID-19 and he remained in the show three years attending mainly the spectacles section.

The Feb-4th-2021 broadcast the first chapter of a podcast Farandula 021, beginning as a new format of Farandula 40 with the same cast, including Pilar Boliver, Mauricio Valle, Mario Lafountain, Manigüis, La Supermana(La doñinini), Alejandro Broff(Merengon) and Jeremi Cruz(El Cuerpo) with the sections Ver o No ver (critic of movies and series), El averno, Adoption of pet, Ask/Answer of sexuality.

== TV shows ==
- Gaceta Cultural, TV Host (1996)
- ECO, TV Host (1997)
- 6205 el Planeta, TV Host (1998)
- Entre Butacas, TV Host (1999)
- Al Despertar, TV Host (1999)
- Trapitos al Sol, TV Host (2001)
- Malas Lenguas, TV Host (2001)
- Válvula de escape/Desde Gayola, TV Host (2001–2006)
- Hoy, TV Host (2007)
- Metropolis, TV Host (2007)
- Nocturninos, TV Host (2008–2012)
- Farandula 40, TV Host (2010–2020)
- Mira quién baila primera temporada (judge) Univisión
- Mira quién baila segunda temporada (judge) Univisión
- Mira quién baila tercera temporada (judge) Univisión
- Mira quién baila cuarta temporada (Judge) Univisión
- Fashion Police, Host (México) E!
- La de 8 / TV Azteca, Host (2013-)
- La Academia (judge/critic) TV Azteca (2018-)
- Venga La Alegría/ TV Azteca, TV Host (2020–2023)

== Filmography ==
- Que nos pasa, Actor (1998)
- Book Of Love, Pedro (2022)

== Radio ==
He co-hosted in the MVS radio station 102.5 FM for the program "Dispara Margot Dispara" next to Sergio Zurita. In the past, he worked for the following radio stations:

- Radio Formula
- XEX
- XEW
- EXA
- NRM Comunicaciones.

== Theatre ==
He has acted in theatre in Mexico City in the following productions:

- Picasso en el Cafe de Paris, Foro Escenaria 11 (2000)
- El Principito. Teatro Independencia (2001)
- Desde gayola, El show. Foro Living/ Gira nacional (2003 / 2004)
- Había una vez: Desde gayola. Foro Living / Mascabrothers show center / Gira nacional (2005/2006)
- Telebasura, Mascabrothers show center/ Gira nacional (2007/ 2009)
- Un Corazón Normal, Teatros Helénico, Independencia, Milán y Aldama. Gira nacional. (2013/ 2015)
- An Act of God, Teatro Xola (2017)
- Los chicos de la banda (2019)

== Controversies ==
Villalobos is a controversial figure who has made harsh critiques to the Mexican artistic media. This has caused many in the Mexican media circuit to have animosity towards him. He holds a strong grudge against Mexican media conglomerate Televisa, criticizing and debasing the company at the slightest provocation.

In a fashion segment of his show Farándula 40, Villalobos, an openly gay man himself, used references to describe South Korean boy band BTS that were criticized as homophobic. He described them in various ways, saying "They look like an LGBT group", asking "are they all men?", "They look like they would work at a gay club" and more. The comments caused outrage among fans of the band and they demanded a public apology. Villalobos later made a statement on Twitter, saying, "It was never the intent of our fashion section on Farándula 40 to offend the fans of BTS. Nor anyone else. If we did, we offer a sincere apology.", but many fans said it lacked sincerity and didn't address the real insults towards BTS or the LGBTQ community.
