= UniMás =

American Spanish-language TV network

- Type: Terrestrial television network
- Country: United States
- Broadcast area: U.S. coverage: 61%
- Headquarters: Doral, Florida

Programming
- Language: Spanish
- Picture format: 1080i HDTV

Ownership
- Owner: TelevisaUnivision
- Key people: Daniel Alegre (President and CEO)
- Sister channels: Univision; Galavisión; Univision tlnovelas; TUDN; De Película; De Película Clásico; FOROtv

History
- Launched: January 14, 2002; 24 years ago (as TeleFutura) January 7, 2013; 13 years ago (as UniMás)
- Replaced: CityVision (June 8, 1998–January 13, 2002)
- Former names: TeleFutura (January 14, 2002 – January 6, 2013)

Links
- Website: univision.com/unimas

Availability

Terrestrial
- Affiliated with terrestrial television stations in select markets: See list of affiliates

Streaming media
- DirecTV Stream, Sling TV, and Vidgo

UniMás (Spanish pronunciation: [ˌuniˈmas], stylized as UNIMÁS, and originally known as TeleFutura from its launch on January 14, 2002, to January 6, 2013) is an American Spanish-language free-to-air television network owned by TelevisaUnivision. The network's programming, which is aimed at Hispanic Americans in the 18–34 age range, includes telenovelas and other serialized drama series, sports, sitcoms, reruns of imported series previously aired on parent network Univision, reality and variety series, and theatrically released feature films (primarily consisting of Spanish-dubbed versions of American movie releases).

The network is operated out of Univision's South Florida headquarters in the Miami suburb of Doral, Florida. Since its launch, the network has made major inroads in overall and demographic viewership, eventually ranking as the second highest-rated Spanish-language television network in key dayparts, behind only sister network Univision, by 2012.

UniMás is available on cable and satellite television throughout most of the United States, with local stations in over 40 markets with large Hispanic and Latino populations. Most of these stations are pass-throughs for the network's main programming feed, offering limited to no exclusive local programming.

== History ==
=== Origins ===
The network traces its origins to Barry Diller's November 1995 acquisition of the Home Shopping Network and its broadcasting arm Silver King Communications, which owned television stations affiliated with HSN in several larger media markets. In June 1998, the renamed USA Broadcasting (which had been merged into the Diller-owned USA Networks in 1997) launched a customized independent station format, "CityVision", which infused syndicated programming – including a few produced by sister production unit Studios USA that also aired nationally on USA Network – with a limited amount of local entertainment and magazine programs (reminiscent of the format used by CITY-TV in Toronto and more prominently, its co-owned stations that became charter outlets of Citytv, when CHUM Limited expanded the format to other Canadian markets as a television system in 2002). USA's Miami outlet, WYHS-TV, served as the test station for the format, disaffiliating from HSN and converting into a general entertainment outlet under the new call letters WAMI-TV.

By September 2000, USA Broadcasting had expanded the "CityVision" entertainment format to three of its thirteen other HSN outlets – with some of the stations adopting call letters referencing common nicknames for their home cities – WHOT-TV in Atlanta, KSTR-TV in Dallas–Fort Worth, and WHUB-TV in Boston. Before the group could carry out the proposed conversions of its other stations into independent stations, USA Networks announced that it would sell off its television station group in the summer of 2000, to focus on its cable network and television production properties. Among the prospective buyers for the thirteen-station group were The Walt Disney Company (which would have created duopolies with ABC owned-and-operated stations in New York City, Los Angeles, Chicago and Houston) and Univision Communications (which would create duopolies with Univision owned-and-operated stations in those same four cities); the latter purchased the USA Broadcasting stations for $1.1 billion on December 7, 2000, with the sale being finalized on May 21, 2001.

=== TeleFutura ===
Original network logo as Telefutura, used from January 14, 2002, to January 6, 2013.

On May 15, 2001, during Univision's upfront presentation, Univision Communications announced its intentions to form a then-unnamed secondary television network that would compete with Univision, Telemundo, and the then-recently launched Azteca América. Organizational plans for the network called for the recently acquired former USA Broadcasting stations to serve as the network's nuclei, with its programming catering to bilingual Latinos with a preference toward watching English-language television programs, as well as young adult males between the ages 18 and 34 that seldom watch Spanish language television other than sporting events; Univision executives expected the network to reach 80% of all Hispanic and Latino households throughout the U.S. that own at least one television set by the time of its launch. Although Univision maintained a dominant market share among the American Spanish-language television networks (holding an 83% share of Latino viewers during prime time at the time), Univision Communications executives did not believe that a second network would result in a cannibalization of the flagship network's market share.

On July 31, 2001, Univision announced that TeleFutura would be the name for the new network, with Univision Communications chairman and chief executive officer A. Jerrold Perenchio noting the name was suggested in part by two of corporate employees to "represent[…] the future of Spanish-language television". Univision continued to run the nine HSN affiliates and four independent stations (one of which regained its affiliation with HSN earlier that year) as English language outlets for several months following the USA Broadcasting purchase.

TeleFutura formally launched at 7:00 p.m. Eastern Time on January 14, 2002, debuting initially on 18 Univision-owned stations (consisting of twelve former USA Broadcasting stations – an additional station, WQHS-TV in Cleveland, was converted into an owned-and-operated station of parent network Univision instead; it would later carry UniMás on a subchannel) – and six others that Univision Communications acquired afterward) and 24 affiliates owned by other companies. Initial programming on the network – which was counterprogrammed to offer distinct programs that do not directly compete with shows aired on Univision – included Escándalo TV ("Scandal TV"; the program was originally titled Escándalo en el Medio Dia, before being changed due to the existence of a similarly titled Mexican program produced by Televisa), a three-hour gossip/entertainment program designed to compete with similar newsmagazines such as Telemundo's Cotorreando (and ran on the network until October 2011); and the daytime talk show Monica.

The remainder of TeleFutura's programming consisted of imported telenovelas from Latin American production companies with which Univision maintained programming agreements including Televisa, Venevisión, Coral Productions, RCTV, RCN and Rede Globo, which aired only on weekday afternoons at its launch. Evenings and weekends primarily consisted of feature films, consisting exclusively of dubbed Spanish prints of American releases from the 1980s onward, as part of the umbrella showcases "CinePlex" (for daytime movies, usually those airing on weekends), "CinEscape" ("Movie Escape" or "Cinema Escape") (for late night movies), "Cine Especial" (""Space Cinema" or "Space Movie") (for special movie presentations) or "Cine de las Estrellas" ("Cinema of the Stars") (for prime time movies). The network also featured news and sports updates during prime time, as well as several sports programs and events including Contacto Deportivo ("Contact Sports"), an hour-long weeknight sports news program; weekly boxing matches on Friday nights; and soccer matches from Liga MX on weekend afternoons.

On June 27, 2006, Univision Communications was acquired by Broadcasting Media Partners Inc. – a consortium of investment firms led by the Haim Saban-owned Saban Capital Group (which had previously owned Saban Entertainment until its sale to The Walt Disney Company in June 2001, as part of News Corporation's sale of Fox Family Worldwide), TPG Capital, L.P., Providence Equity Partners, Madison Dearborn Partners and Thomas H. Lee Partners – for $12.3 billion (increasing to $13.7 billion or $36.25 per share by the sale's closure), plus the assumption of $1.4 billion in debt. The sale received federal approval and was formally consummated on March 27, 2007.

During the February 2007 sweeps period, according to Nielsen Media Research, TeleFutura made significant gains in viewership at the expense of Telemundo, which it overtook for second place among the major Spanish-language networks in the key demographics of Adults 18–34, Men 18–34, and Men 18–49. On February 26, 2010, TeleFutura once again ranked as the second highest-rated Spanish-language network in the United States and earned its highest ratings for an entertainment special in the network's history, with the finale of the reality competition series Buscando La Doble de Selena ("Search for Selena's Double"), which attracted 1.9 million total viewers. TeleFutura finished 2012 as the youngest broadcast network with a median age of 36 and finished the year averaging 642,000 total viewers aged 2 and up. It also ranked as the second-highest-rated Spanish-language network in 2012 in key dayparts among Adults 18–49 and Adults 18–34.

=== UniMás ===
First logo as UniMás, used from January 7, 2013, to October 31, 2021.

On December 3, 2012, Univision Communications announced that it would relaunch TeleFutura as UniMás – which loosely translates to "Univision Plus", to underline its ties to its parent network Univision – with a programming refocusing to appeal more towards Latino males between the ages of 12 and 35 years old. The revamped network would feature Mexican and Colombian-imported programming from Televisa, Caracol Televisión and RTI Colombia (the latter two of which compete with RCN in the domestic Colombian market), which had maintained longstanding programming and production agreements with rival Telemundo, through contracts struck months before the relaunch, it would also increase its reliance on sports content for its weekend schedule.

The new logo and brand identity, which debuted on-air at 5:00 a.m. CST on January 7, 2013 (exactly one week before the network's 11th anniversary), were created in collaboration with branding firm Troika Design Group. As part of the campaign to announce the launch, Univision Communications launched an extensive advertising campaign for UniMás that included promotional spots, digital ads, print ads and outdoor advertising in New York City, Los Angeles and Miami. The network's prime time was revamped to feature several new serial dramas formatted of a grittier nature than the romance-themed telenovelas produced by Televisa that air on Univision to appeal to male viewers including the Colombian adaptation of Breaking Bad, Metástasis; the crime dramas Made in Cartagena and ¿Quién Eres Tú? ("Infringement"); and the boxing-themed drama Cloroformo ("Chloroform"), which were included among the relaunched network's initial prime time offerings.

On May 13, 2019, UniMás refocused its programming strategy in order to target a younger audience to that of its parent network Univision, with a focus on news, sports, unscripted entertainment and reality shows, most of them broadcast live. On that day, the network added an early edition of Noticiero Univision: Edición Nocturna at 10 p.m., coinciding with the arrival of Colombian newsreader Patricia Janiot to the broadcast, co-anchoring alongside Enrique Acevedo. On October 31, 2021, this shift was completed with the launch of a new wordmark logo and brand identity, designed, as in 2013, by Troika Design Group, and a new slogan, Vívelo Todo ("Live it All").

== Programming ==
UniMás operates on a 126-hour network programming schedule, which it has maintained since its launch as TeleFutura in January 2002. It provides general entertainment programming to owned-and-operated and affiliated stations daily from 6:00 a.m. to 1:00 a.m. Eastern and Pacific Time. Two separate children's programming blocks known as "Toonturama" and "Toonturama Junior" – which features some programs compliant with FCC educational programming requirements – airs for five hours each Saturday at 7:00 a.m. Eastern and Pacific Time. All other time periods are filled with infomercials.

As TeleFutura, the network featured a broad mix of programming, consisting of telenovelas, sports, feature films, entertainment newsmagazines, comedy series (such as ¡Qué Locura! ("What Madness!") and Chespirito), game shows (such as the Family Feud adaptations ¿Qué dice la gente? ("What do the People Say?") and 100 Mexicanos Dijeron ("A Hundred Mexicans Said"))) and variety series (such as Pepsi Música ("Pepsi Music") and Sabadazo). In January 2009, TeleFutura launched the daily gossip show La Tijera, hosted by Charitin Goyco, Liliana Rodriguez, Paul Bouche, Carolina Sandoval and Augusto Valverde. The hosting staff was gradually altered over its two-year run to include Tanya Charry, Raul Garcia, Anabelle Blum and Rodolfo Jimenez joining Sandoval; the show was cancelled in October 2011. On October 10, 2011, La Tujera was replaced by a daily gossip show Tómbola, while the network also debuted a late night talk show Noche de Perros; due to low ratings, Tombola was cancelled on January 17, 2012, followed by Noche de Perros three months later on April 20.

Currently, the majority of UniMás' programming consists of telenovelas and series produced by Televisa (the majority of which originated on the company's flagship network in Mexico, Canal de las Estrellas), Caracol Televisión and RTI Colombia; several of the network's Televisa-sourced programs (including Casos de Família ("Family Cases") and El Chavo del 8) have also previously aired on parent network Univision, many having aired on that network years prior to being broadcast on UniMás. It also carries a moderate amount of first-run original programming produced by sister production unit Univision Studios, including the reality courtroom show Veredicto Final and sports magazine program Zona NBA.

Notably, UniMás was to replace Telemundo as the U.S. Spanish language broadcaster of the Miss Universe and Miss USA pageants through an agreement with the Miss Universe Organization that was signed on February 5, 2015. However, Univision Communications chose to relinquish the rights to the two pageants on June 25 of that year, as part of its decision to cut business ties with then-Miss Universe Organization co-owner Donald Trump in response to controversial remarks he made during his June 16 speech announcing his candidacy for the Republican Party Presidential nomination in which Trump falsely stated that Mexicans immigrating into the U.S. were responsible for the transporting of illegal drugs, brought crime, rapists and drug dealers into the country, and called for the building of a wall along the Mexico–United States border. The termination of the agreement led Trump and the Miss Universe Organization to jointly file a breach of contract and defamation lawsuit against Univision Communications in the New York Supreme Court on June 30, 2015, seeking $500 million in damages.

=== News programming ===
The only general news program to have aired on the network to date debuted on October 17, 2005, when TeleFutura began airing En Vivo y Directo ("Live and Direct"), a half-hour early evening newscast that aired at 7:00 p.m. Eastern Time (opposite a taped 4:00 p.m. news program on sister network Galavisión) that featured an in-depth analysis of news stories affecting the U.S. Hispanic community. The program was cancelled in April 2006 due to low ratings, replacing the newscast with movies.

As UniMás, on September 20, 2015, the network began airing Fusion Presenta ("Fusion Presents"), a weekly block on Sunday nights consisting of Spanish-language versions of original docu-series originally aired on English language sister cable network Fusion. In November 2015, the network also began simulcasting Univision's late night newscast, Noticiero Univision Edición Nocturna on weeknights, as Univision began several simulcasting efforts to maximize its ratings, including having lead-out program Contacto Deportivo airing both on Univision and Univision Deportes Network to compete against the flagship English broadcast and the ESPN Deportes Spanish version of ESPN's SportsCenter.

=== Sports programming ===
Through its association with Univision's sports division, Univision Deportes (which is also responsible for the production of sports content on Galavisión and its dedicated cable-satellite sports channel Univision Deportes Network), UniMás broadcasts soccer matches from Liga MX (which have aired since the network's inception in January 2002) and Major League Soccer. The network has also broadcast weekly boxing matches on most Fridays for much of its history; as TeleFutura, the network debuted a new weekly boxing showcase, Sólo boxeo, on April 30, 2010.

The network also served as a supplementary Spanish-language broadcaster of the FIFA Men's and Women's World Cups through Univision Communications' exclusive contract with FIFA for the U.S. Spanish-language television rights to the tournament that concluded in 2014 (Telemundo and NBC Universo assumed the contract beginning with the 2015 Women's World Cup). Just a few months after its launch TeleFutura first aired the replays of the 2002 FIFA World Cup. As TeleFutura, it carried eight live games during the 2006 FIFA U-20 Women's World Cup, all occurring during the last days of group play when multiple games are played simultaneously (in the same capacity that ESPN2 served for English-language rightsholder ESPN); the network also aired replays of tournament matches and World Cup recap shows. In 2007, TeleFutura acquired the exclusive rights to broadcast weekly Major League Soccer games on Sunday afternoons; its relationship with the league expanded in 2012, when the network aired the MLS Cup, which was watched by 485,000 viewers (a 58% increase from the 2011 final and a 109% increase over the 2010 final, both of which aired on Galavisión).

Upon the rebrand to UniMás, the network increased its sports offerings with events such as soccer matches from the Mexico National Team and Liga MX, and the acquisition of rights to the 2013 CONCACAF Gold Cup, the 2013 FIFA Confederations Cup and Copa América Centenario, along with the 2014 FIFA World Cup and the 2015 CONCACAF Gold Cup. TeleFutura shows carried over to the relaunched UniMás included sports programs such as Solo Boxeo and the nightly sports news program Contacto Deportivo (which would eventually move to Univision after a twelve-year run on TeleFutura/UniMás on March 8, 2015). On November 1, 2014, UniMás began airing rebroadcasts of the El Rey Network professional wrestling showcase Lucha Underground on Saturday afternoons. On May 3, 2015, the network debuted a weekly sports magazine program Zona NBA ("NBA Zone"), featuring news and interviews from around the National Basketball Association (NBA).

The network began airing UEFA Champions League and UEFA Europa League matches in 2018 as a result of Univision acquiring the Spanish-language rights to UEFA club competitions from Fox Sports beginning with the 2018–19 season.

TelevisaUnivision will also have the exclusive Spanish-language rights in the U.S. to the 2024 American League Division Series and American League Championship Series, which will air on UniMás and simulcast on TUDN, with select games on Univision. Additionally, Game 1 of the 2024 World Series will be broadcast on Univision.

=== Children's programming ===
For much of its history, the bulk of TeleFutura/UniMás' children's programming was derived of mainly live-action and animated programming from American and international producers, much of which consisted of dubbed versions of series natively produced in English (including Bob the Builder, Ned's Newt and Dumb Bunnies).

When the network launched in 2002, TeleFutura launched three children's program blocks aimed at different audiences: "Mi Tele" ("My TV"), a two-hour animation block on weekday mornings featuring a mix of imported Spanish-language cartoons (such as Fantaghiro and El Nuevo Mundo de los Gnomos ("The New World of the Gnomes")); and two weekend morning blocks, "Toonturama", a three-hour lineup that mainly featured dubbed versions of American and European animated series as well as anime series (such as Flight Squad and Problem Child, Lost Universe, Tenchi Universe and Red Baron; Toad Patrol was an exception to the dubbing as it needed to use an English dub to fix translation issues) and a two-hour companion block that preceded it on Saturday and Sunday mornings, "Toonturama Junior", featuring programs aimed at preschoolers that fulfilled educational programming requirements defined by the Federal Communications Commission's Children's Television Act (among the programs featured on "Toonturama Junior" was Plaza Sésamo ("City Square Sesame"), Televisa and Sesame Workshop's Spanish-language adaptation of Sesame Street featuring a mix of original segments featuring characters based on its U.S.-based parent series and dubbed interstitials from the aforementioned originating program, which had aired on Univision since 1995 and passed on the U.S. television rights to TeleFutura at its launch). On September 9, 2018, in an agreement with Animaccord, the network launched the popular Russian cartoon Masha and the Bear, airing it every Sunday morning.

== Stations ==
As of October 2015, UniMás has 26 owned-and-operated stations, and current and pending affiliation agreements with 19 additional television stations encompassing 19 states, the District of Columbia and the U.S. territory of Puerto Rico. Counting only conventional over-the-air affiliates, the network has a combined national reach of 46.54% of all households in the United States (or 145,419,291 Americans with at least one television set).

Despite Univision's over-the-air expansion since its sister network launched as TeleFutura, UniMás has been slower in expanding its national coverage through broadcast television outlets and does not have over-the-air stations in several major markets with relatively sizeable populations of Hispanic and Latino residents where Univision and/or at least one of its competing Spanish language networks have broadcast affiliates, most notably Seattle, Washington; Kansas City, Missouri; Amarillo, Texas; and Midland, Texas. Partly in order to fill these gaps, UniMás provides a national cable network feed that is distributed directly to cable, satellite and IPTV providers as an alternative method of distribution in markets without either the availability or the demand for a locally based owned-and-operated station or affiliate.

The network maintains affiliations with low-power stations in a few markets, such as Philadelphia (WFPA-CD), Bakersfield, California (KBTF-CD), Las Vegas (KELV-LD) and Palm Springs, California (KEVC-CD). In some markets, including both of those mentioned, these stations also maintain digital simulcasts on a subchannel of a co-owned/co-managed full-power television station. UniMás also maintains a handful of subchannel-only affiliations in a few markets, the largest by market size being WUVG-DT2 in Atlanta, Georgia, whose parent station operates as a Univision owned-and-operated station.

Currently, the Entravision Communications Corporation is the largest operator of UniMás stations in terms of both numerical total and overall market reach, owning or providing services to 20 UniMás-affiliated stations, including that are relayed on subchannel of full-power sister stations and two that the company operates under local marketing agreements with network parent Univision Communications (including stations in markets such as Boston (WUTF-DT) and Orlando (WOTF-DT)).

== Related services ==
=== Video-on-demand services ===
UniMás provides video on demand access for delayed viewing of full episodes of the network's programming through various means, including via Hulu's Hulu Latino platform through a content deal with the service. The network also a traditional VOD service – UniMás on Demand – which is carried on most traditional cable and IPTV providers, which originally launched on February 1, 2011, as TeleFutura On Demand, and also offers the network's news programming, tape-delayed versions of its sports telecasts and feature film content alongside telenovelas.

Due to restrictions imposed on the streaming service by Univision Communications, Hulu limits day-after-air streaming of newer episodes of UniMás' programs to subscribers of its subscription service until eight days after their initial broadcast, in order to encourage live or same-week (via both DVR and cable on demand) viewing. Like the video-on-demand television services provided by the other U.S. broadcast networks, UniMás on Demand disables fast forwarding for content provided through the service.

==== UVideos ====
Since the service launched on October 29, 2012, Univision Communications' multi-platform streaming service UVideos has made full-length episodes of UniMás' programs (including those produced by Televisa and its other content providers) available on its website at UVideos.com and companion mobile app for smartphones and tablet computers supporting the iOS and Android platforms (with programs streamable over 3G and WiFi networks). The most recent episodes are usually made available for streaming on the service (as well as Univision on Demand) the day after their original broadcast to subscribers of participating pay television providers (such as Comcast, Verizon FiOS and Time Warner Cable) using an ISP account via an authenticated user login. The service also includes select original digital content, user-enabled English subtitling for most programs (except for excerpts from Noticiero Univision broadcasts) as well as a social stream featuring viewer comments from the UVideos and other social media platforms, which are time-synched to the user's local time zone to mimic a live relay to the user as posted during the program's original broadcast.

==== Univision Now ====
On November 18, 2015, Univision Communications launched Univision Now, an over-the-top subscription video on demand streaming service, which features program content from both UniMás and Univision without requiring an existing pay television subscription in order to access. The service – which is available for either $5.99 per month or $59.99 per year, although prospective users can access content through a seven-day free trial – is initially available via a dedicated website (univisionnow.com), and apps for iOS and Android devices.

The service carries UniMás' alternative series, classic series previously seen on the network and live soccer matches from Liga MX and Major League Soccer; a live stream of the network's main feed is also available, and incorporates a DVR-style "rewind" feature allowing users to replay live content up to 72 hours after their broadcast. New episodes of prime time series aired on UniMás and Univision – both original content and programs from their distribution partners – are made available for streaming the day after their broadcast on the two linear television networks and are accessible for seven days following their airdate. Restrictions imposed by film studios that supply such content for the network prohibit certain movies carried on UniMás from being made available on Univision NOW.

=== UniMás HD ===
UniMás' master feed is transmitted in 1080i high definition, the native resolution format for Univision Communications' network television properties. However, twelve UniMás-affiliated stations – all but one of which is owned by Entravision Communications – currently transmit the network's programming in 480i standard definition, either due to technical considerations for affiliates of other major networks that carry programming from another network in high definition on their main channel or because a primary feed UniMás affiliate has not yet upgraded their transmission equipment to allow content to be presented in HD.

What was then TeleFutura launched its high definition simulcast feed, branded as TeleFutura HD, at 12:02 a.m. Eastern and Pacific Time on January 1, 2010, on its East and West Coast flagship stations in New York City and Los Angeles, WFUT/WFTY-DT and KFTR-DT (which, along with Univision, became the last two U.S. broadcast networks to begin offering their programming in HD). Most of the network's programming is presented in HD As of October 2015 (including most telenovelas; sports programs, including soccer events; newsmagazines; and most feature films, depending on the availability of high-definition "television" cuts of films) is broadcast by the network in high definition; exceptions exist with certain telenovelas, sitcoms and variety series as well as select children's programs aired as part of the network's weekend morning children's block produced prior to 2008 that air in reruns, which continue to be presented in their native 4:3 standard definition format. DirecTV began carrying the Eastern Time Zone feed of the HD simulcast nationwide on April 28, 2010; Dish Network subsequently added it two weeks later on May 12, 2010. TeleFutura's HD format was also rebranded as UniMás HD on January 7, 2013.

== Controversies ==
=== Carriage disputes ===
On March 4, 2016, UniMás, along with its sister channels, Univision, Galavisión, TUDN and Univision tlnovelas were dropped by AT&T U-verse due to a carriage dispute. This however, did not affect DirecTV customers, despite being a subsidiary of AT&T, as they were done on a separate deal. All of Univision's channels (including UniMás) were later returned to the U-verse lineup on March 24, 2016.

On January 27, 2017, Charter Spectrum (along with Time Warner Cable and Bright House, the latter merged with Charter Communications on 2016) faced another dispute with Univision, warning Charter Communications that UniMas and its sister channels could be removed from Charter by January 31, 2017. Prior to then, Univision sued Charter over pay carriage rates at the New York Supreme Court in July 2016. On, January 31, Charter customers lost access to all of Univision's channels, including UniMás and Galavision. On February 2, the New York Superior Court ordered Univision to end the blackout on Charter as negotiations continue. This blackout affects all Univision affiliates, even if Univision doesn't own them, so it included all stations owned by Entravision Communications, even if Entravision was not involved in the dispute.
