= Univision Tlnovelas =

Spanish language American cable television network

- Country: United States
- Headquarters: Doral, Florida

Programming
- Language: Spanish
- Picture format: 720p (HDTV); 480i widescreen (SDTV)

Ownership
- Owner: TelevisaUnivision
- Sister channels: Univision; UniMás; TUDN; Galavisión; De Pelicula; De Pelicula Clasico; FOROtv

History
- Launched: March 1, 2012; 14 years ago

Links
- Website: www.univision.com/tlnovelas

Availability

Streaming media
- Service(s): DirecTV Stream, YouTube TV, Vidgo

Univision tlnovelas is a Spanish language American cable television network dedicated to broadcasting telenovelas. It is owned by TelevisaUnivision. The channel launched on March 1, 2012.

== History ==
Univision tlnovelas was announced in May 2011 as part of three new cable channels launched by Univision Communications. Univision Communications reached its first pay TV deal with the Dish Network to carry the channels in January 2012. Univision tlnovelas began broadcasting on March 1, 2012. On May 11, 2012, AT&T U-verse signed a carriage agreement with Univision Communications to carry the channel, along with Univision Deportes Network.

DirecTV began carrying the channel in March 2013.

== Programming ==
Programming for Univision Tlnovelas is filled by Televisa's telenovela library, including telenovelas which have previously never aired in the United States.

== Carriage disputes ==
Univision tlnovelas, along with sister channels Univision, UniMás, Galavisión and Univision Deportes Network were dropped by AT&T U-verse on March 4, 2016, because of a carriage dispute. This did not affect DirecTV customers (also owned by U-verse owner AT&T). They were returned to the lineup on March 24, 2016.

== See also ==
- Tlnovelas
