= TUDN (American TV channel) =

- Country: Mexico; United States
- Broadcast area: United States
- Headquarters: Mexico City, Mexico; Miami, Florida, United States; San Juan, Puerto Rico

Programming
- Language: Spanish
- Picture format: 1080i HDTV (downscaled to letterboxed 480i for the SDTV feed)

Ownership
- Owner: TelevisaUnivision
- Sister channels: Univision; UniMás; Galavisión; Univision Tlnovelas; De Pelicula; De Pelicula Clasico; N+ Foro

History
- Launched: April 7, 2012; 14 years ago
- Former names: Univision Deportes Network (UDN) (2012–2019)

Links
- Website: www.tudn.com

Availability

Streaming media
- Service(s): DirecTV Stream, YouTube TV, Hulu + Live TV and Vidgo

TUDN (pronounced tu-de-ene; formerly called Univision Deportes Network) is an American Spanish language sports channel based in Mexico. Owned by TelevisaUnivision, it is an extension of the company's sports division of the same name, with TUDN the acronym of TelevisaUnivision Deportes Network. It launched on April 7, 2012, along with Univision Tlnovelas and FOROtv.

The network's main properties include major soccer events in the Americas, including per-team coverage of Liga MX, the Copa América, and CONCACAF's Champions League and Gold Cup events. In 2018–19, it also became the Spanish rightsholder of the UEFA Champions League. The channel has ties with the Mexican sports channel of the same name, sharing some of its programming. In 2019, it was announced that TDN and UDN would jointly relaunch as TUDN—signifying a greater amount of collaboration between the two channels.

As of February 2015, approximately 39.7 million households (34.1% of those with television) received the channel. Univision stated per Nielsen ratings that TUDN was the sixth-highest rated U.S. sports channel in 2019 in terms of average primetime viewership. By June 2023, this number has dropped to 23.2 million households.

== History ==
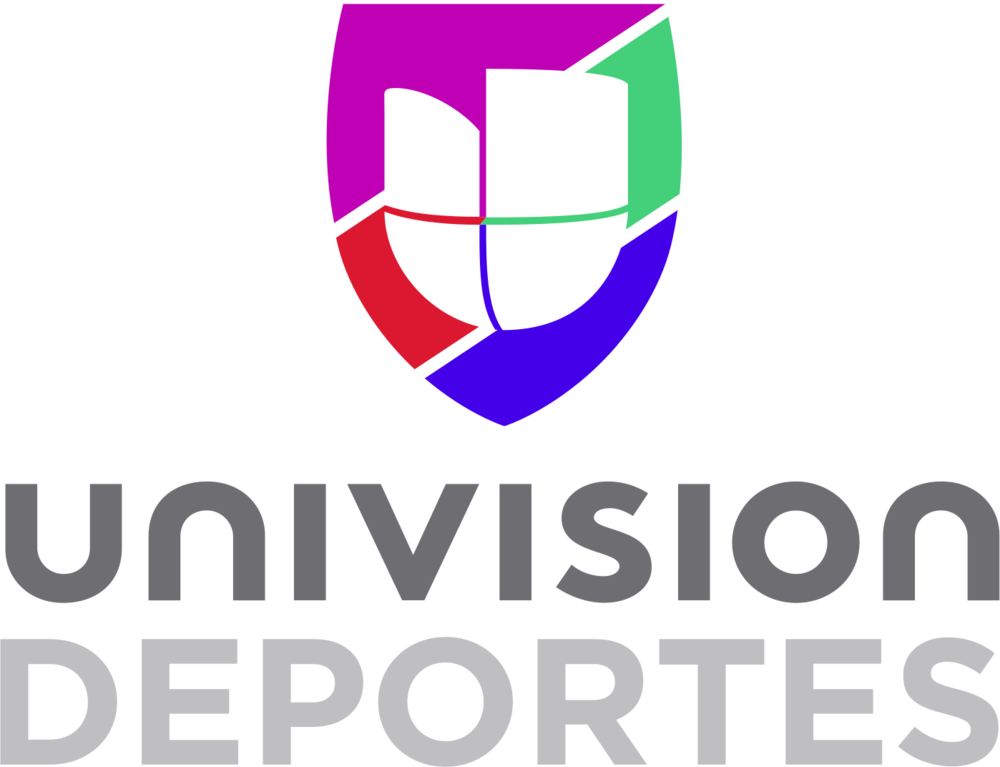
Logo used from January 27 to July 19, 2019, before the merger of Televisa Deportes Network to from TUDN.

In May 2011, Univision Communications announced three new cable television channels to strengthen its position in the Latino market and diversify revenues, including one dedicated to soccer and other sports. It signed a deal with the Dish Network in January 2012 to carry the channels via satellite. The channel dedicated to sports was named Univision Deportes Network. On May 11, 2012, AT&T U-verse signed a carriage agreement with Univision Communications to carry the channel, along with Univision Tlnovelas.

The channel had an output agreement to carry selected programming from Televisa Deportes Network (TDN); the network was branded as Univision TDN during these programs.

At launch, it offered a secondary network known as Univision Deportes Network Dos airing repeats of matches and studio programming, which was exclusively carried by Dish, but is currently defunct.

In May 2019, it was announced that both Televisa Deportes Network and Univision Deportes Network would be jointly rebranded as TUDN. Univision Deportes Network officially rebranded as TUDN on July 20, 2019. The new branding is an abbreviation of both names ("Televisa Univision Deportes Network"), but the first two letters are also pronounced as the Spanish adjective "tu" (your), allowing the name to also be read as "Tu Deportes Network" ("Your sports network").

TUDN is a multi-platform brand, and has a closer collaboration between the American and Mexican channels, allowing for expanded studio programming in the morning and daytime hours (to bolster its expansion into European soccer with its recent acquisition of UEFA rights, and existing content such as Liga MX soccer).

In February 2022, TelevisaUnivision announced that TUDN would launch a streaming channel known as "Zona TUDN" on the Vix streaming platform.

On August 23, 2024, it was reported that TUDN had closed its Miami offices and laid off all staff, as part of cutbacks prompted by the loss of broadcasting rights with key clubs such as Tigres and Chivas. The operations of TUDN in the U.S. were moved to the network's Mexico City headquarters.

== Programming ==
The network's signature program is Univision Deportes Fútbol Club, an hour-long sports update show hosted by Xavi Sol (as of late 2017) alongside Félix Fernández and Hristo Stoichkov. There was a late-night version of the program hosted by Alejandro Berry, son of former news and sports anchor Jorge Berry, with various rotating analysts. The two editions

of Fútbol Club differed by tone and style, with the early evening version being more lighthearted and comedic, while the late night version consisted of a round table discussion regarding the day's action (similar in format to ESPN's Around the Horn). The latter version was later renamed "Linea de Cuatro".

TUDN broadcasts home games for 16 of 18 teams in the Liga MX, away matches for the rest of the teams and playoff games. The weekly Saturday night program – Fútbol Central hosted by Edgar Martinez – features soccer highlights and previews matches from the Mexican league. Other competitions covered include the CONCACAF Champions League and Major League Soccer. Rights to MLS games in 2012 are shared with sister networks Galavision and UniMás.

In January 2016, Univision acquired Spanish-language rights to UEFA tournaments beginning in 2018, including UEFA Euro 2020 and the UEFA Nations League, with the channel planned to be involved in coverage. In 2017, Univision acquired Spanish-language rights to the UEFA Champions League and Europa League beginning in 2018-19.

From 2013 until 2019, the network held the rights to U.S. Spanish-language rights to Formula One, with ESPN/ESPN Deportes acquiring all American rights with the 2020 season.

== Sporting Events ==
=== Football association ===
CONCACAF:

- CONCACAF Gold Cup
- CONCACAF Nations League
- CONCACAF Under-17 Championship
- CONCACAF Under-20 Championship
- Leagues Cup

AFC

- AFC Champions League Elite
- AFC Champions League Two
- AFC Challenge League
- AFC Asian Cup
- AFC U-20 Asian Cup
- AFC Women's Asian Cup
- AFC U-20 Champions League
- AFC Women's U-17 Asian Cup
- AFC U-17 Asian Cup

CONMEBOL:

- Copa América (2021)
- Copa América Femenina (2022)
- CONMEBOL Pre-Olympic Tournament

Mexico:

- Campeón de Campeones
- Copa MX
- Liga MX
  - América
  - Atlas
  - Cruz Azul
  - León
  - Atlante
  - Necaxa
  - Pachuca
  - Puebla
  - Querétaro
  - San Luis
  - Toluca
  - Santos
  - UNAM
  - Tijuana
- Mexico national team
- Supercopa MX
- Liga MX Femenil
  - Club América
  - Cruz Azul
  - Necaxa
  - Toluca
  - Tigres UANL
  - Pumas UNAM

(Europe) UEFA (2018-2027):

- UEFA Euro 2024
- European Qualifiers
- UEFA Champions League
- UEFA Europa League
- UEFA Conference League
- UEFA Super Cup
- UEFA Nations League

=== Billiards ===
- Derby City Classic
- Mosconi Cup
- World Pool Championship
- World Pool Masters
- WPA World Ten-ball Championship
  - WPA Women's World Ten-ball Championship

=== Combat sports ===
- Solo Boxeo Bud Light
- Combate Global
- Sabados de Corona

=== Professional wrestling ===
- CMLL Super Viernes

=== Former programming ===
==== Soccer ====
- FIFA tournaments

France:

- Ligue 1

Mexico:

- Liga MX: Guadalajara, Juárez, Mazatlán and Veracruz and UANL home matches

Netherlands:

- Eredivisie

Portugal:

- Primeira Liga

United States:

- MLS
- MLS All-Star Game
- United States men's national soccer team
- United States women's national soccer team

Germany

- Bundesliga

=== Motor sports ===
- Formula One
- Formula Two
- Formula Three

=== Bull riding ===
- Professional Bull Riders

== Controversies ==
=== Carriage disputes ===
Univision Deportes Network, Univision, UniMás, Galavisión and Univision Tlnovelas were dropped by AT&T U-verse on March 4, 2016, due to a carriage dispute. This did not affect DirecTV Customers (although being a subsidiary of U-Verse's parent company, AT&T), as this was done in a different contract. All of Univision's channels were returned to the U-verse lineup on March 24, 2016.

== See also ==
- TUDN Radio
- Televisa Deportes Network
