= Galavisión =

American pay television channel

- Logo used since 2024
- Country: United States

Programming
- Language: Spanish
- Picture format: 1080i HDTV

Ownership
- Owner: TelevisaUnivision
- Sister channels: Univision; UniMás; TUDN; Univision Tlnovelas; De Película; De Película Clásico; FOROtv

History
- Launched: September 1, 1979; 46 years ago

Links
- Website: www.univision.com/galavision

Availability

Streaming media
- Service(s): DirecTV Stream, Vidgo

Galavisión is an American Spanish-language pay television network owned by TelevisaUnivision. The network is unrelated to the earlier Mexican channel of the same name, though both broadcast Televisa-produced programming.

As of February 2015, approximately 68,355,000 American households (58.7% of households with television) received Galavisión.

== History ==
Galavisión was launched as a premium cable network by Spanish International network (now Univision) on September 1, 1979, broadcasting a mix of classic and recent Mexican and other Spanish-language films as well as Spanish-dubbed recent Hollywood productions.

By 1984, the network became a general entertainment basic cable channel, offering a combination of Televisa programming and SIN reruns.

In the mid 1990s, Galavisión was led by Javier Saralegui and aired a mix of Spanish- and English-language programs like Kiki desde Hollywood or Funny is Funny. They also incorporated Miami-produced variety entertainment show A Oscuras Pero Encendidos, hosted by Paul Bouche. It complemented this strategy with Televisa-produced programs that first aired on Univision, with entertainment and some news programs from Televisa's all-news network ECO, including an Entertainment Tonight-style program anchored by Pita Ojeda and Ilia Calderón.

Since the year 2000, Galavisión aired a combination of classic comedy, telenovelas, and late night shows from the 1970s, 1980s and 1990s that aired originally on Univision, with more present-day offerings from news, sports and specials originating from Televisa's three networks, Las Estrellas, FOROtv, and Nueve as well as two shows produced by Televisa's music network, TeleHit.

On its most recent programming strategy, Galavisión expanded original productions with shows like Acceso máximo, En casa con Lucy, Delicioso (hosted by Ingrid Hoffmann), Vida total, Decorando contigo, Un destino, Lo mejor de boxeo en esta esquina, the best of sister network UniMás's Solo boxeo series.

The Televisa produced programming is also crafted to fit strict broadcast standards.

== Programming ==
=== Current programming ===
Title	Premiere date
Comedy series
La familia P. Luche	
María de todos los Ángeles	
Vecinos	
Nosotros los guapos	May 30, 2017
Los cousins	April 30, 2018
Una familia de diez	June 13, 2019
Lorenza	September 3, 2019
Mi querida herencia	September 30, 2019
40 y 20	August 7, 2020
Renta congelada	January 8, 2021
Julia vs. Julia	February 6, 2021
Dr. Cándido Pérez	July 4, 2021
Perdiendo el juicio	November 2, 2021
XH Derbez	February 7, 2022
Simón dice	June 3, 2022
Talk/reality shows
Me caigo de risa	June 4, 2022

=== Former programming ===
==== Telenovelas ====
- A que no me dejas (October 25, 2021 - February 4, 2022)
- Acapulco, cuerpo y alma (April 2, 1998 - July 22, 1998)
- Al diablo con los guapos (April 28 - September 19, 2014; March 15 - July 27, 2021)
- Alma de hierro (March 25–29, 2013)
- Alma rebelde (June 18 - October 24, 2001)
- Alondra (January 5–February 27, 1999, first-run; May 2, 2004 – January 30, 2005)
- Amada enemiga (June 8 - September 25, 1999)
- Amigas y Rivales (September 22, 2014 - April 14, 2015)
- Amigos x siempre (November 29, 2000 - April 30, 2001)
- Amor de barrio (February 10 - April 24, 2020)
- Amor Real (September 15 - December 19, 2014)
- Amor sin maquillaje (May 7–24, 2018)
- Amorcito corazón (September 7, 2020 - March 2, 2021)
- Amy, la niña de la mochila azul (May 11 - October 16, 2015)
- Angela (March 15 - July 1, 2000; May 8 - August 24, 2001)
- Antes muerta que Lichita (February 17 - July 31, 2020)
- Apuesta por un amor (October 8, 2006 - March 5, 2007; November 30, 2021 - March 7, 2022)
- Atrévete a Soñar (June 20, 2016 - February 13, 2017; June 20 - September 16, 2022)
- Aventuras en el tiempo (January 14 - June 14, 2002; August 14, 2017 - January 19, 2018)
- Bajo un mismo rostro (Mid summer 1998 - October 5, 1998)
- Camila (March 7 - July 8, 2000; May 8 - September 11, 2001)
- Cañaveral de Pasiones (November 14, 1997 - January 21, 1998; October 6, 1998 - February 13, 1999)
- Carita de Ángel (May 18 - December 9, 2015)
- Clap, el lugar de tus sueños (May 29 - August 11, 2017)
- Cómplices Al Rescate (January 4 - June 8, 2016)
- Código Postal (January 19 - November 9, 2018)
- Confidente de secundaria (January - April 1998)
- Corazón salvaje (March 28 – November 7, 1997; September 2 – October 27, 1998; July 13, 2003 – April 25, 2004)
- Cuando me enamoro (November 30, 2015 - May 27, 2016)
- Cuento de Navidad (November 4–28, 2000; December 15, 2003 - January 2, 2004; December 12–30, 2011; December 9–27, 2013; December 10–30, 2015; November 28 - December 16, 2016)
- Cuidado con el ángel (February 14 - August 10, 2017)
- De que te quiero, te quiero (March 2 - November 30, 2020)
- Despertar contigo (September 1 - November 29, 2021)
- DKDA: Sueños de juventud (January 2 - July 21, 2001)
- El diario de Daniela (February 26 - July 19, 2018)
- El vuelo de la victoria (July 20 - October 2, 2020)
- Enamorándome de Ramón (April 27 - July 20, 2020)
- En carne propia (July 6, 1999 - November 13, 1999)
- Eva Luna (soap opera) (April 7 - July 18, 2014)
- Gotita de amor (March 20 - July 6, 2000; August 20 - December 11, 2001)
- Hasta que el dinero nos separe (September 10, 2012 - February 15, 2013)
- La casa en la playa (August 31 - November 29, 2001)
- La fea más bella (February 11 - October 25, 2013; October 8, 2018 - April 9, 2019)
- La fuerza del destino (September 19, 2016 - February 8, 2017; December 14, 2020 - March 1, 2021)
- La Madrastra (January 26 - May 15, 2015)
- La mujer del Vendaval (March 7 - July 11, 2022)
- La que no podía amar (November 7, 2016 - March 22, 2017)
- La sombra del otro (April 16, 1998 - July 9, 1998)
- La Taxista (June 3 - September 23, 2019; first-run; August 17 - December 16, 2020; rerun)
- La usurpadora (February 21 - July 14, 2000; December 4, 2001 - April 27, 2002)
- La vecina (February 7, 2022 - June 17, 2022)
- Las amazonas (May 10 - June 22, 2021)
- Las Tontas No Van al Cielo (April 1 - June 14, 2013; October 8, 2018 - March 8, 2019)
- Leonela, muriendo el amor (April 21 - October 2, 1999)
- Llena de amor (October 19, 2015 - July 15, 2016; March 11 - September 20, 2019)
- Lola, érase una vez (May 15 - December 14, 2017; April 4 - September 8, 2022)
- Los elegidos (September 21 - November 6, 2020)
- Luz Clarita (April - June 1998; January - March 1999; July 10 - October 13, 2000)
- Mar de amor (November 9, 2020 - March 12, 2021)
- María Isabel (December 28, 1998 - February 9, 1999; July 4 - September 30, 2000; August 28 - December 1, 2001)
- María la del Barrio (January 22 - March 27, 1998; March 22 - July 28, 1999; August 17 - December 27, 2000; May 6 - September 12, 2019)
- María Mercedes (May 14 - September 4, 1998; July 29 - November 24, 1999; April 24 - August 16, 2000; March 16 - May 28, 2015; May 6 - August 27, 2019)
- Marimar (November 18, 1998 - March 19, 1999, January 12 - April 22, 2000, June 1 - September 15, 2015)
- Marisol (August 5 - November 13, 1997; December 28, 2000 - July 21, 2001)
- Mi corazón es tuyo (May 29 - October 1, 2018; October 29, 2018 - April 5, 2019)
- Mi Destino Eres Tú (November 30, 2001 - April 4, 2002; March 27 - May 26, 2017)
- Mi pequeña traviesa (September 15, 1999 - February 4, 2000; July 23, 2018 - January 8, 2019)
- Misión S.O.S (May 30 - October 7, 2016)
- Miss XV (March 25, 2013 - May 24, 2014)
- Muchachitas como tú (May 18 - December 7, 2020)
- Mujer de madera (August 28, 2019 - February 7, 2020)
- Mujeres engañadas (December 4, 2001 - May 24, 2002)
- Navidad sin fin (December 9–27, 2013; December 15, 2014 - January 2, 2015; December 21, 2015 - January 1, 2016; December 19, 2016 - January 6, 2017)
- Niña de mi corazón (January 27 - May 15, 2020)
- Nunca Te Olvidaré (December 27, 2000 - May 5, 2001)
- Pobre niña rica (October 16, 1997 - January 21, 1998)
- Porque el amor manda (May 13 - September 20, 2019)
- Por ella soy Eva (September 23, 2019 - February 13, 2020)
- Por tu amor (July 24 - December 1, 2001)
- Preciosa (October 16, 2000 - February 16, 2001)
- Pueblo chico, infierno grande (February 16 - June 5, 1999)
- Qué pobres tan ricos (July 11 - September 6, 2022)
- Ramona (March 4 - June 14, 2002)
- Rayito de luz (December 8–31, 2015; November 28 - December 23, 2016)
- Rebelde (May 29, 2017 - May 2, 2018)
- Rencor apasionado (October 3 - December 26, 2000)
- Rosalinda (May 7 - August 24, 2001)
- Rubí (July 7 - October 10, 2014)
- Salomé (July 29, 2019 - February 28, 2020)
- Sentimientos Ajenos (January 22 - April 15, 1998; July 23 - September 2, 1998)
- Siempre te amaré (January 21 - June 7, 2002)
- Sin ti (September 28, 1999 - January 11, 2000)
- Somos tú y yo (October 12, 2011 - January 29, 2012)
- Soñadoras (February 19 - October 24, 2001)
- Sortilegio (November 24, 2014 - February 20, 2015)
- Soy Luna (June 25 - October 26, 2018)
- Tenías que ser tú (March 2 - May 3, 2021)
- Tres mujeres (March 25–29, 2013)
- Tú y yo (July 10, 1998 - January 26, 1999; September 22, 1999 - February 21, 2000)
- Un gancho al corazón (July 18, 2016 - March 6, 2017)
- Un refugio para el amor (June 23, 2021 - October 22, 2021)
- Una familia con suerte (September 22, 2014 - January 16, 2015; January 14, 2019 - January 21, 2020)
- Vencer el miedo July 28 - August 31, 2021
- ¡Vivan los niños! (May 2 - September 15, 2016)
- Yo amo a Juan Querendon (October 28, 2013 - April 25, 2014)
- Yo compro esa mujer (October 28 - December 23, 1998)

==== Drama series ====
- Como dice el dicho
- El Pantera (September 7, 2020 - November 4, 2020)
- Esta historia me suena (September 6, 2019 - September 16, 2022)
- Falsos falsificados (March 3, 2021 - May 28, 2021)
- Los Cowboys (September 21, 2016 - January 30, 2017)
- La rosa de Guadalupe
- Los héroes del norte (January 19, 2018 - December 1, 2018)
- Mujer, Casos de la Vida Real (September 19, 2011 - October 14, 2011; April 1, 2013 - January 2, 2014; May 25, 2014 - July 20, 2014)
- Prueba de Fe (April 15, 2019 - 2020)
- Regalos de vida (December 23, 2019 - 2021)
- Sin miedo a la verdad (November 9, 2020 - March 2, 2021)

==== Comedy programming ====
- Al Derecho y al Derbez
- A Oscuras Pero Encendidos (March 1, 1997 - January 30, 2000)
- Anabel
- Aquí está la Chilindrina (2009)
- Bajo el mismo techo (February 23, 2019 - June 15, 2019)
- Bienvenidos
- Casate Conmigo mi Amor
- Casos y Cosas de Casa
- Cheverisimo
- Chespirito
- Con Ganas
- Corazón contento (December 28–30, 2020)
- Dr. Cándido Pérez
- Durmiendo con mi jefe
- El Balcon de Veronica
- El Chapulín Colorado
- El Chavo del 8 (2000 - August 1, 2020)
- El Privilegio de Mandar (March 4, 2018 - August 19, 2018)
- El show de la Pantera Rosa (June 1, 2020 - May 29, 2022)
- Enchufe TV (September 5, 2016 - 2017)
- Furcio
- Goin' Loco (July 18, 2019 - 2021)
- Hospital el Paisa (February 24, 2019 - June 9, 2019)
- Hotel todo incluido
- La Hora Pico
- La parodia a domicilio (June 16, 2019 - 2021)
- La Rochela
- Locos y sueltos (2009)
- Los González (May 31, 2017 - May 24, 2018; August 26, 2018 - February 7, 2019)
- Los Super Pérez (2016)
- No Te Equivoques
- Que Locos
- ¡Qué madre tan padre!
- Radio Pirata
- Se rentan cuartos (December 21–24, 2020)
- Una familia de diez
- XH Derbez (May 15, 2017 - June 6, 2019)
- Y Sin Embargo Se Mueve

==== Reality/non-scripted ====
- Al Desnudo
- Con Cierta Intimidad
- Narcos: Guerra antidrogas (February 11, 2017 - April 22, 2017)
- Familias frente al fuego (August 31, 2019 - October 14, 2019)
- GalaScene
- La Apuesta (October 13, 2016 - December 23, 2016)
- Parodiando Noches de Traje (2016; February 24, 2019 - June 9, 2019)
- Pequeños Gigantes USA (May 29, 2017 - July 14, 2017)
- VideoMix

==== Talk shows ====
- Al sabor del chef (February 11, 2019 - March 31, 2019)
- Club 4 TV
- Con Todo
- Cuentamelo Ya (September 19, 2016 - March 10, 2017; April 3 - May 27, 2017; May 2 - August 12, 2022)
- El show de Johnny y Nora Canales (July 20, 2018 - September 24, 2018)
- En Casa de Lucy
- En Constraste
- Esta noche con Arath (August 30, 2016 - November 7, 2016)
- Hasta el límite
- Hoy (April 29, 2002 - 2011; 2022)
- Laura (May 31, 2021 - 2022)
- México de mil sabores (February 11, 2019 - July 7, 2019)
- Mojoe
- Nuestra Casa
- Pa'La Banda Night Show
- ¡Qué Mujeres!
- Vida Total
- Vida TV

==== News ====
- Al aire con Paola Rojas (August 22, 2016 - April 5, 2019)
- Lo mejor de Aquí y Ahora
- Archivos de más allá
- Crónicas (February 23, 2019 - May 30, 2020)
- Despierta (August 22, 2016 - March 13, 2020)
- En punto (August 22, 2016 - 2022)
- Las Noticias por Adela
- Las Noticias con Danielle Dithurbide (August 22, 2016 - February 8, 2019)
- Las Noticias con Karla Iberia (February 13, 2017 - March 10, 2017; April 3, 2017 - April 12, 2017)
- Los Reporteros
- Más Alla de la Fama
- Más Curiosidades (June 3, 2019 - April 2, 2021)
- Noticiero con Joaquin Lopez Doriga (April 29, 2002 - August 19, 2016)
- Noticiero con Lolita Ayala
- Noticiero con Lourdes Ramos
- Noticiero con Paola Rojas
- Nueva Vision
- Paralelo 23 (December 17, 2018 - September 27, 2019)
- Por Usted
- Primero Noticias (April 29, 2002 - August 19, 2016)
- Tras la verdad
- Vision AM

==== Children's programming ====
- Ángeles (June 26, 2017 - April 15, 2018)
- Aventuras en Pocketville (June 26, 2017 - December 3, 2017)
- Cuentos de hadas (May 29, 2017 - July 21, 2019)
- El Chapulín Colorado Animado (April 29, 2017 - September 2, 2017)
- El Chavo Animado (May 31, 2016 - October 21, 2017)
- El sofá de la imaginación
- Funnymals (June 20, 2016 - October 26, 2018)
- Humphrey
- Jelly Jam (June 26, 2017 - November 26, 2017)
- Kin (August 13, 2018 - January 27, 2019)
- Kipatla (July 16, 2018 - August 10, 2018; December 17, 2018 - January 11, 2019)
- La CQ (May 30 - August 31, 2016; June 18 - July 20, 2018; December 8, 2020 - March 2022)
- La Familia Telerin (June 26, 2017 - November 26, 2017)
- Mi casita
- Monstruos y piratas (June 27, 2017 - April 22, 2018)
- Planeta Burbujas (July 22, 2019 - March 1, 2020)
- Salsa
- The Avatars (September 4, 2017 - February 13, 2019)
- Woki Tokis (August 13, 2018 - January 27, 2019)

==== Game shows ====
- 100 mexicanos dijieron (August 1, 2017 - March 2018)
- 123 x Mexico (April 9, 2016 - May 21, 2016)
- El juego de las estrellas (June 10, 2017 - March 2018)
- Minuto para ganar VIP (June 4 - September 2, 2022)
- Recuerda y Gana (April 9 - June 2016)

==== Sports programming ====
- Acción
- Boxeo en Esta Esquina
- Fanaticos del Frio
- FIFA Women's World Cup
- FIFA World Cup
- Formula 1 (April 8, 2018 - 2019)
- Fútbol A Fondo
- Fútbol Mundial
- La Jugada
- Liga MX
- Lucha Libre
- Más Deportes
- UEFA Champions League (August 21, 2018 - 2022)
- Zona Abierta

== Galavisión HD ==
The channel launched in 1080i high definition on June 1, 2010. DirecTV launched the channel in HD on August 15, 2013.

== Over-the-air availability ==
In the past, Galavisión had two over-the air affiliates. KWHY was the Los Angeles affiliate until it became a Spanish independent station in 1994; while in Houston, the affiliate was KTFH, which started carrying the network in 1989. The arrangement ended in 1995, choosing to affiliate with the Infomall Television Network upon the station's acquisition by Paxson; the station is currently an Ion Television affiliate.

== Controversies ==
=== Carriage disputes ===
Galavisión, along with its sister channels, Univision, UniMás, Univision Deportes Network and Univision Tlnovelas were dropped by AT&T U-verse on March 4, 2016, due to a carriage dispute. This did not affect DirecTV customers (although it was a subsidiary of U-Verse's parent company, AT&T) as this was done in a different contract before AT&T acquired DirecTV. All of Univision's networks, including Galavisión, were returned to the U-verse lineup on March 24, 2016 after finalizing a carriage deal.

On January 27, 2017, Charter Spectrum (along with Time Warner Cable and Bright House, the latter merged with Charter Communications in 2016) faced another dispute with Univision, warning Charter Communications that Galavision and its sister channels could be removed from Charter by January 31, 2017. Prior to then, Univision sued Charter over pay carriage rates at the New York Supreme Court in July 2016. On January 31, 2017, Charter customers lost access to all of Univision's channels, including UniMás, and Galavisión (including access to its Owned-and-Operated Stations via Charter). On February 2, the New York Superior Court ordered Univision to end the blackout on Charter as negotiations continue. This blackout affects all Univision affiliates, even if Univision doesn't own them, so this dispute includes all stations owned by Entravision Communications, even if Entravision was not involved in the dispute.

On October 16, 2017 at around 5 PM EDT, Verizon FiOS, without any warning, pulled Univision, along with UniMás, UDN, and Galavisión despite an extension of an agreement arranged by the two.
