= Dmitry Loveyko =

Russian businessman

Dmitry Gennadievich Loveyko (Russian: Дмитрий Геннадьевич Ловейко, born 5 January 1965) is a Russian businessman, co-producer of the animated series Masha and the Bear and Smiley, one of the founders of Animaccord Studio and the founder of the Agama Film Animation Studio.

== Biography ==
Dmitry Loveyko was born on 5 January 1965. In 1989, he graduated with a degree in theoretical cybernetics from the Novosibirsk State University (NSU). In 1989–1991, Loveyko was an intern at the Institute of Mathematics. In addition, after graduation, he taught at the NSU and studied artificial intelligence. In Novosibirsk he took part in the KVN comedy show among with future TV presenters Tatyana Lazareva, Alexander Pushnoy and Andrey Bocharov.

Нe held the position of marketing director of the Novosibirsk Fat Plant and also worked as director of development at the Novosibirsk Bakery Plant No.2. Together with his university friends, the businessman created the Nanolyot Company which organized a branch of the Europa Plus Radio in Novosibirsk.

In the late 1990s, he received a distance financial and marketing education, as well as additional professional education at the Moscow State Technical University of Civil Aviation in the early 2000s.

In 2005, Loveyko moved from Novosibirsk to Moscow, where he assumed the position of development director of the Vzlyot Company.

In 2008, he was invited to participate in the animation project Masha and the Bear. The businessman also became one of the founders of the Animaccord Animation Studio.

In 2017, Loveyko founded the Agama Film Studio that released animated series Feyerinki and the adult animated series Bone Voyage.
