= SocioMX Cup =

The SocioMX Cup is an international soccer tournament played in the United States as part of the SocioMX Tour since 2015 and includes four matches with men's First League Mexican teams. Founded by sports executive Jorge Villalobos, CEO of Sports Marketing Monterrey, SocioMX is a powerful soccer platform that connects the fans with their favorite team through unique live and digital experiences, including the SocioMX Cup. The matches are televised in the US by Univision Deportes and internationally via ESPN in more than twenty-one countries including Mexico and Latin America. Both, the SocioMX Cup and SocioMX Tour are part of the events hosted by SocioMX, a powerful platform that engages soccer fans through: professional matches broadcast on live television, soccer stars, promotions, experiences and digital strategies.

== Rules of the Cup ==
- Four teams participate
- Teams begin the tournament at the Semifinals; the winners play the Final, while the losers play for the Third Place.
- If teams are tied after 90 minutes, the penalty kicks decide the winner of the match
- The matches follow the International friendly game rules stipulated by FIFA for substitutions.

== SocioMX Tour 2018-2014 ==
The SocioMX Tour has different and separate dates from the SocioMX Cup. These matches are classified as international friendly matches by FIFA and can end up in draw or be defined by penalty kicks.

SocioMX has organized the SocioMX Tour hosting different matches per year in different cities of the United States since 2014.

SocioMX Tour
Year	Date	Match	Place	Stadium
2018	October 13	Earthquakes vs Cruz Azul	San Jose, California	Avaya
2018	July 3	Cruz Azul vs Monterrey	McAllen, Texas	Veterans Memorial
2018	June 29	Dynamo vs Monterrey	Houston, Texas	BBVA Compass
2018	March 25	Cruz Azul vs Monterrey	San Antonio, Texas	Toyota Field
2017	October 5	Dynamo vs Cruz Azul	Houston, Texas	BBVA Compass
2017	July 11	Pumas vs Puebla	Edinburg, Texas	HEB Park
2017	July 8	Monterrey vs Pumas	Dallas, Texas	Cotton Bowl
2017	July 8	Cruz Azul vs Toluca	Dallas, Texas	Cotton Bowl
2017	July 2	Cruz Azul vs Monterrey	Houston, Texas	BBVA Compass
2017	March 25	Cruz Azul vs Pumas	Dallas, Texas	Cotton Bowl
2016	November 13	Cruz Azul vs Pumas	Houston, Texas	BBVA Compass
2016	October 9	Cruz Azul vs Atlas	San Antonio, Texas	Toyota Field
2016	June 29	Cruz Azul vs Xolos	Los Ángeles, California	LA Coliseum
2015	July 8	Cruz Azul vs América	El Paso, Texas	Sun Bowl
2015	June 27	Pumas vs Toluca	Sacramento, California	Bonney Field
2014	July 9	Chivas vs Cruz Azul	Los Ángeles, California	StubHub Center
2014	July 6	Monterrey vs Scorpions	San Antonio, Texas	Toyota Field
2014	July 6	Cruz Azul vs Pumas	Chicago, Illinois	Soldier Field
2014	July 3	Cruz Azul vs Monterrey	Dallas, Texas	Cotton Bowl

== SocioMX Cup 2016 ==
The 2016 edition was held from July 2 to July 6, 2016 in the cities of San Jose, California, Houston and Dallas in Texas.

Cruz Azul, Pumas, Monterrey y Santos Laguna were part of the Cup. It was the first tournament of Francisco Palencia as a coach with Pumas.

2016 SocioMX Cup 2016
Tournament details
- Dates: 2– 6 July 2016
- Teams: 4
- Venue(s): (in 3 host cities)

Final positions
- Champions: 2016: (Mexico) Santos (1st title); 2015: (Mexico) Cruz Azul (1st title)

Tournament statistics
- Matches played: 4
- Goals scored: 9 (2.25 per match)

=== Participating teams ===
- Cruz Azul
- Pumas UNAM
- Monterrey
- Santos Laguna

=== Tournament ===
Semi-finals
July 2 - San José
Santos Laguna	2
Pumas UNAM	1
July 3 - Houston
Cruz Azul	2
Monterrey	1

Final
July 6 - Dallas
Santos Laguna	1
Cruz Azul	0
Third place
July 6 - Dallas
Pumas UNAM	2
Monterrey	0

==== Semifinals ====
SocioMX Cup
2016-07-02
18:00
Semifinals

Pumas UNAM	1-2	Santos Laguna
Fuentes 68		Rabello 46, Armenteros 78

Avaya Stadium
SocioMX Cup
2016-07-03
10:00
Semifinals

Cruz Azul	2-1	Monterrey
Guerrón 47, Zúñiga 86		Pabón 41

BBVA Compass Stadium

==== Third Place ====
SocioMX Cup
2016-07-06
18:00
Third Place

Monterrey	0-2	Pumas UNAM
		Barrera 22, Herrera 50

Cotton Bowl Stadium

==== Final ====
SocioMX Cup
2016-07-06
20:30
Final

Cruz Azul	0-1	Santos Laguna
		Rodríguez 14

Cotton Bowl Stadium

== SocioMX Cup 2015 ==
It was the first edition of the annual tournament between Mexican football teams in United States. This event was played from June 30 to July 5 in the city of Los Angeles (California), Austin and Dallas in Texas.

As in 2016, the competition started in the Semifinals. The winners go to the Final, while teams that vied fell to Third Place. In matches were tied after 90 minutes, resorted to penalty kicks to determine the winner.

=== Participating teams ===
- Cruz Azul
- Pumas UNAM
- Monterrey
- Monarcas Morelia

=== 2015 Tournament ===
Semi-finals
June 30 - Los Ángeles
Cruz Azul	1 (5)
Pumas UNAM	1 (4)
July 2 - Austin
Monterrey	3
Monarcas	2

Final
July 5 - Dallas
Cruz Azul	2
Monterrey	0
Third place
July 5 - Dallas
Pumas UNAM	1 (6)
Monarcas	1 (5)

==== Semifinals ====
SocioMX Cup
2015-06-30
20:00
Semifinals

Cruz Azul	1-1 (5-4)	Pumas UNAM
Silva 20		Verón 34

LA Coliseum
SocioMX Cup
2015-07-02
20:00
Semifinals

Monterrey	3-2	Monarcas
Pabon 31 y 33, Funes Mori 89		Rodríguez 33 y Villalpando 78

Mike A. Myers Stadium

==== Third Place ====
SocioMX Cup
2015-07-05
15:00
Third Place

Pumas UNAM	1-1 (6-5)	Monarcas

Cotton Bowl Stadium

==== Final ====
SocioMX Cup
2015-07-05
18:00
Final

Cruz Azul	2.0	Monterrey
Silva 9 y Rojas 75

Cotton Bowl Stadium
