= A Oscuras Pero Encendidos =

- Created by: Astracanada Productions Inc.
- Starring: Paul Bouche
- Country of origin: United States

Production
- Running time: 60 minutes

Original release
- Network: Syndication
- Release: December 4, 1995 – 2001

A Oscuras Pero Encendidos (Spanish pronunciation: [a osˈkuɾas ˈpeɾo ensenˈdiðos], In the Dark but Turned On) was the first late night variety show produced for the Hispanic market in the United States. The "live" show, produced by Astracanada Productions Inc, launched in 1995 in Miami, Florida on WJAN-CA America CV, and was a combination of celebrity guests, games, practical jokes, and audience participation. It differed from traditional American late night shows, incorporating sexy co-hostesses, interactive phone games, and a variety of vaudeville acts. For its six-year run, the nightly show was hosted by its creator and producer Paul Bouche. In 1997, the show won an Emmy Award from the National Academy of Television Arts and Sciences in the Entertainment Series category. A Oscuras Pero Encendidos generated ratings results attracting a substantial share of the young 18-35 demographic.

The show developed a cult following in Miami and in 1997, Univision owned Galavisión started transmitting the series via cable television, allowing it to reach all Spanish-speaking markets in the United States. In 2000, Telemundo picked up the program for national broadcast in open-air stations reaching all the United States and Puerto Rico.

The show was the first to experiment with both "late night", a time period seldom exploited by the Spanish-language television networks, and the production of local Spanish language entertainment television for audiences of diverse Hispanic origins. Until 1995, all entertainment offerings were geared to an audience of Mexican descent, which resided predominantly on the West Coast. From 1995 until the year 2001, A Oscuras Pero Encendidos was the only daily local Spanish Language entertainment production in South Florida. Currently there are five local Spanish-language stations in the city of Miami producing over 30 shows.

In 2007, La Boca Loca De Paul was launched as a syndicated late night variety show for the US Hispanic market and Latin America. Also hosted by Paul Bouche, this show retained many elements of A Oscuras Pero Encendidos. Since its inception "La Boca Loca de Paul" generated substantial rating increases in its time period.

In 2011, "La Boca Loca De Paul" was launched in Syndication in the US and in Puerto Rico through Mega TV generating "substantial" rating results with young viewers.

In 2020 in celebration of the 25th anniversary of the launch of the series, its production company Astracanada Productions Inc launched a YouTube channel featuring all the content produced by the company since inception.

Since June 2020 daily clips of "A Oscuras Pero Encendidos" are available on the YouTube channel @paulbouchetv

== US Hispanic Latenight / Variety Competitors ==
Telefutura Noche de Perros (Dog's Night) was a Spanish-language variety/talk show which was hosted by Carlos Calderon, Gabriel Varela and Daniel Carles. The show's debut was October 31, 2011. The show was a Spanish language version of "The Man's Show" from Comedy Central. Five months after its launch Telefutura announced that the show would be canceled. The last show aired on April 20, 2012.

Univision Con La Noche Encima(With The Night On Top) was a Spanish-language variety/talk show which was hosted by Horacio Villalobos and Javier "Poty" Castillo. The show's debut was August 4, 2011 on Univision. It was promoted as a two episode special and a test for a possible permanent late-night program. No more episodes were produced.

Telemundo Mas Vale Tarde (It's Better Late) was a Spanish-language variety/talk show which was hosted by Alex Cambert. The show's debut was November 29, 2007 on Telemundo. The show followed a similar format to other English-language late-night shows. The last show aired in April 2008.

Univision announced previously in its 2006 upfront presentation that they would produce their own late night show ¡Ay Qué Noche! (Oh What a Night!) which would be hosted by Cristian de la Fuente. Despite the announcement, the show was not launched.
