= U-verse TV =

Television service provider owned by DirecTV

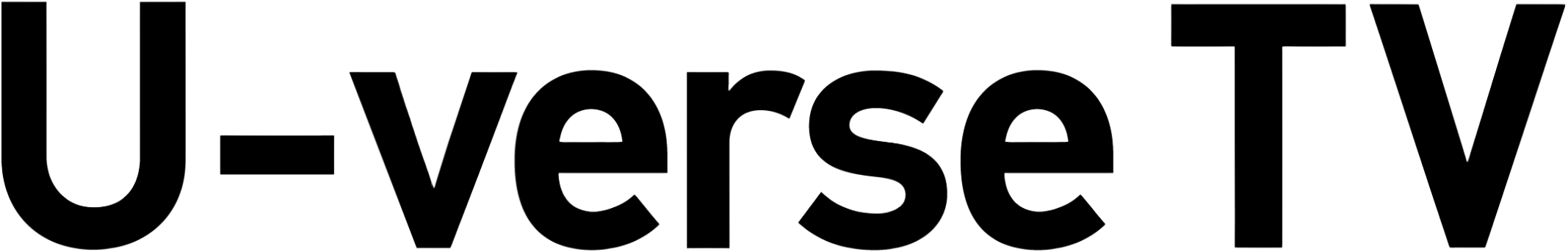
- Type: IPTV
- Founded: June 26, 2006; 20 years ago
- Owner: TPG Inc.
- Parent: DirecTV
- Official website: www.directv.com/u-verse/

U-verse TV is an internet protocol television (IPTV) service operated by DirecTV. Launched on June 26, 2006, U-verse was originally a triple play package that included broadband Internet (now AT&T Internet or AT&T Fiber), IP telephone (now AT&T Phone), and IPTV (U-verse TV) services in 22 states.

On February 25, 2021, AT&T announced that it would spin off DirecTV into a separate entity, containing the U-verse TV and AT&T TV services, selling a 30% stake to TPG Capital while retaining a 70% stake in the new standalone company. The deal was closed on August 2, 2021.

== History ==
The current U-verse TV ultimately derives from the IPTV part of the former AT&T U-verse triple-play telecommunications service.

SBC Communications announced its plans for a fiber-optic network and Internet Protocol television (IPTV) deployment in 2004 and unveiled the name "U-verse" (formerly "Project Lightspeed") for the suite of network services in 2005. SBC eventually became AT&T in late 2005, and the AT&T name was applied for the service. AT&T U-verse was commercially launched June 26, 2006, in San Antonio.

By the third quarter of 2012, AT&T U-verse had 4.3 million TV subscribers.

At an analyst meeting in August 2015, following AT&T's acquisition of satellite provider DirecTV, AT&T announced plans for a new "home entertainment gateway" platform that will converge DirecTV and U-verse around a common platform based upon DirecTV hardware with "very thin hardware profiles". AT&T Entertainment and Internet Services CEO John Stankey explained that the new platform would offer "single truck roll installation for multiple products, live local streaming, improved content portability, over-the-top integration for mobile broadband, and user interface re-engineering."

In February 2016, Bloomberg reported that AT&T was in the process of phasing out the U-verse IPTV service by encouraging new customers to purchase DirecTV satellite service instead, and by ending the production of new set-top boxes for the service. An AT&T spokesperson denied that U-verse was being shut down and explained that the company was "leading its video marketing approach with DirecTV" to "realize the many benefits" of the purchase, but would still recommend U-verse TV if it better-suited a customer's needs. AT&T CFO John Stephens had also previously stated that DirecTV's larger subscriber base as a national service gave the service a higher degree of leverage in negotiating carriage deals, thus resulting in lower content costs.

On May 16, 2016, AT&T acquired Quickplay Media, a cloud-based platform that powers over-the-top video services.

On September 19, 2016, AT&T announced that the "U-verse" brand would no longer apply to its broadband and phone services, renaming them "AT&T Internet" and "AT&T Phone", respectively.

In selected markets, AT&T began to replace AT&T U-verse TV with a new service based on its DirecTV Now platform, AT&T TV, in August 2019.

On April 3, 2020, AT&T began announcing that U-verse would no longer be available to new customers. New customers ended up receiving AT&T TV for TV service. However, by September 2020 AT&T spokesman Ryan Oliver, when asked if AT&T was still selling U-verse, said that “U-verse is available in select locations,” and "AT&T never stopped selling U-verse", even though an AT&T customer attempted to order U-verse, but ended up receiving 2 boxes of AT&T TV instead.

On August 2, 2021, the spin off of DirecTV, AT&T TV and U-verse was completed. It is now a wholly owned subsidiary of DirecTV, with AT&T TV becoming DirecTV Stream.

== Services ==
AT&T U-verse's electronic program guide

AT&T used the Ericsson Mediaroom platform to deliver U-verse TV via IPTV from the headend to the consumer's receiver, required for each TV. Transmissions use digital H.264 (MPEG-4 AVC) encoding, compared to the existing deployments of MPEG-2 codec and the discontinued analog cable TV system. The receiver box does not have a RF tuner, but is an IP multicast client that requests the channel or "stream" desired. U-Verse TV supports up to four/six active streams at once, depending on service tier. The system uses individual unicasts for video on demand, central time shifting, start-over services and other programs.

=== Carriage negotiations ===
- AT&T removed Hallmark Channel and Hallmark Movie Channel from AT&T U-verse TV effective September 1, 2010, due to a carriage dispute. An AT&T spokesperson stated, "Hallmark has refused to provide AT&T and its customers with a fair deal—one that is no worse than similarly-sized and smaller providers—and refused to adhere to key obligations under our current deal", while Hallmark Channel's president and CEO Bill Abbott said he was "...stunned by the apparent disregard for the facts ... If they are really serious, my team and I are ready for truly fair negotiations." After the removal, the channels temporarily provided free previews of Starz Kids & Family and Turner Classic Movies. Crown Media Holdings operates the two Hallmark channels in the United States.
- Univision tlnovelas and Univision Deportes Network began on U-verse on May 11, 2012, after a carriage agreement was signed with Univision Communications.
- Just prior to the 2010 series premiere of the AMC program Mad Men, AT&T and Rainbow Media resolved a carriage dispute without interruption to any channels. AT&T stated that Rainbow, "...had been trying to force the renegotiation of a contract for one of their other channels that is not yet expired." It was speculated that this additional contract renegotiation was for Sundance Channel and was successfully concluded, due to Rainbow Media's summation, "We're pleased to have reached an agreement with AT&T for AMC, WE tv, IFC and Sundance Channel that truly recognizes the value of our networks."
- HGTV, the Food Network, the DIY Network, the Cooking Channel, and Great American Country were temporarily inaccessible between November 5 and November 7, 2010, due to a carriage dispute with Scripps Networks. U-verse vice president Brian Shay stated afterward that AT&T had received a "fair deal".
- U-verse picked up the Longhorn Network on August 31, 2012, increasing its availability to 12.9% of the Austin, Texas television market.
- On January 15, 2013, U-verse came to terms with Disney on a new wide-ranging multiple-year carriage agreement for all Disney, ESPN and ABC Networks, which included the addition of Disney Junior.
- On February 28, 2015, 46 Music Choice channels and MC Play were removed and were replaced by 75 Stingray Music channels.
- On October 26, 2015, U-verse came to terms with Tribune Media on a new wide-ranging multiple-year carriage agreement for all Tribune stations, which includes the addition of WGN America.
- AT&T removed Univision, UniMás, Galavisión, Univision Deportes Network and Univision tlnovelas from AT&T U-verse effective March 4, 2016, due to a carriage dispute. Although U-verse was in an integration process with DirecTV, which became a subsidiary of AT&T, it did not affect DirecTV customers during the process. All of Univision's channels were later returned to the U-verse lineup on March 24, 2016.

== See also ==
- IPTV
