= Tómbola (TV series) =

- Starring: Marisa del Portillo; Tanya Charry; Carolina Sandoval; Andrés García Jr. Alexandra Rodriguez

Production
- Production location: Miami, Florida
- Running time: 85-90 minutes

Original release
- Network: Telefutura
- Release: October 10, 2011 – January 17, 2012

Tómbola is a Spanish language entertainment news show hosted by Marisa del Portillo, Tanya Charry, Carolina Sandoval, actor/model Andrés García Jr., and actress/TV host Alexandra Rodriguez. From October 10, 2011, to December 29, 2011, Telefutura aired Tómbola weeknights at 6pm/5pm central, succeeded both Escandalo TV & La Tijera. From December 30, 2011, to January 17, 2012, Tombola aired weekdays at 5pm/4pm central, and was canceled afterwards, due to low ratings.
