= Carolina Sandoval =

Venezuelan TV personality (born 1973)

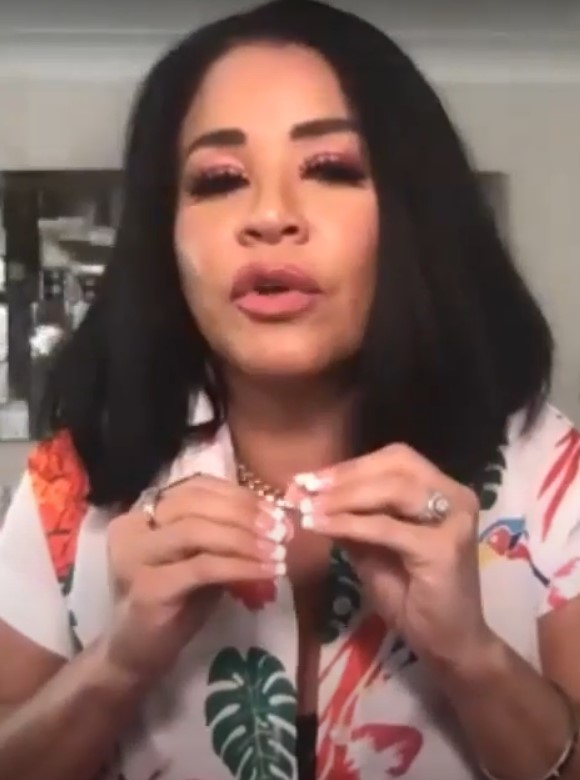
- Sandoval in 2020
- Born: Carolina Sandoval Guzman; November 24, 1973 (age 52); Venezuela
- Other name: la postre de Miami
- Website: www.venenosandoval.com

Carolina Sandoval Guzman, also known as La Venenosa ("the Venomous One"), was born on November 24, 1973, in Venezuela. Sandoval is a TV presenter, journalist, broadcaster, writer, anchor and actress.

== Career ==
=== Early career ===
Sandoval studied journalism at the Central University of Venezuela and theater at the University Institute of Theater in Venezuela. Her first television appearance was in the Venezuelan soap opera Amor Mio (My Love) on the Venevisión network. Sandoval's first position as an announcer was with speaker and humorist Luis Chataing. Her first foray into print media was 15 years ago in Bloque De Armas magazines such as Venezuela Farandula, Revista Ronda and Enquirer. Sandoval has also worked at El National (The National) and El Globo de Caracas (The Caracas Globe), and was a correspondent for RCTV.

=== 2000–2009 ===
Sandoval has lived in Miami since 2001, where she made her first appearance on American television on the entertainment show El Gordo y la Flaca and was a correspondent on Univision's Sábado Gigante. She appeared in TVyNovelas and Tvnotas magazines in the U.S. By the end of 2002, Sandoval was working with El Gordo Cadelago on a Radio Unica entertainment program.

From 2001 through 2007, she was host and collaborator of Infraganti, an entertainment show on the CaribeVisión network with Graciela Mori and Orlando Segura. At the beginning of 2009 Sandoval appeared on a radio segment, "Efectos Secundarios" ("Side Effects"), with Laura Duque and hosted by Jose Antonio Ponsetti. She appeared on Escándalo TV in a segment ("El Lavadero") where La Tijera was one of the hosts. Sandoval appeared on the show until its cancellation in October 2011.

=== 2010–present ===
On January 24, 2010, Sandoval participated in the Univisión special Unidos por Haiti (United for Haiti) with Juanes, Raúl De Molina and Natalia Jiménez. The program was hosted by Don Francisco to collect funds for Haitian relief. On April 1 she was invited to co-host Escándalo TV on TeleFutura with Felipe Viel, Marisa Del Portillo and Lilia Luciano. On May 27, Sandoval was invited to co-host ¡Despierta América!. On June 13 she hosted with Raul Gracia, Felipe Viel, Elizabeth Lopez and Carolina La O, Bienvenido el Mundial (Welcome to the World Cup), welcoming the FIFA World Cup. On June 28 in North Carolina, Sandoval received an award for being the boldest host. On July 12, she was a host on the memorial special for Michael Jackson. On July 14 Sandoval appeared on Univisión's Don Francisco Presenta, where she spoke about her life and background. On September 24 she was invited to Mexico by journalist Shanik Berman to co-host her show, Shanik En Formula.

On November 1, Sandoval began a forum on Univision.com; later that month, she was named best co-host of 2010 by People en Español. On December 5 she was invited by pitcher Sammy Sosa to a dinner in honor of Dominican President Leonel Fernández, and again appeared on Shanik En Formula.

In 2011, Sandoval was selected by People En Espanol for its list of 50 most beautiful people. On February 18 she was invited to the third edition of Nuestra Belleza Gay Latina ("Our Latina Gay Beauty") in Atlanta, and on June 4 was interviewed with her daughter for Univisión's Saturday show Viva La Familia (Live The Family). Sandoval was part of a panel on TeleFutura's Famosos in 2010 and 2011. In its June edition, TVyNovelas featured an article about Sandoval at home. On July 23, she was invited to co-host Viva La Familia with Karen Martinez and Jeannette Kaplun; that same week, she again co-hosted Escándalo TV with Felipe Viel and Marisa Del Portillo. Sandoval also appeared in the play Monologando: porque hablar solo no es de Locos (Monologue: Because Talking to Yourself Doesn't Make You Crazy), produced in Miami by Venezuelan director and producer Manuel Mendoza.

In 2011, Sandoval was named best co-host by People en Español for the second consecutive year. On November 23, she co-hosted ¡Despierta América! with Karla Martínez and Raúl González. In December, Sandoval appeared on the cover of Gente Latina magazine and co-hosted Teletón Mexico on TeleFutura. She presented the awards during the finale of Protagonistas and hosted Tómbola from October 2011 to January 2012.

Since 2013 Sandoval is in the panel of TV show Suelta la Sopa of Telemundo with descriptive segments that reveal the best kept secrets of favorite soap opera stars narrated in a docudrama style.

== Personal life ==
In January 2011, Sandoval had surgery after being diagnosed with thyroid cancer.
