= Masha and the Bear =

Russian animated TV series

- Genre: Adventure; Comedy; Slapstick
- Created by: Oleg Kuzovkov
- Screenplay by: Oleg Kuzovkov; Oleg Uzhinov; Natalya Rumiantseva; Denis Chervyatsov; Nikolai Kuzovkov; Joe Ksander; Kevin R. Adams; Ernest Kataev; Greg Nix; Marina Sycheva; Alex Budovsky; Hunter Cope; Aleksey Karanovich; Aleksandr Filyurin; Vadim Golovanov; Ekaterina Kozhushanaya; Ken Scarborough; Raye Lankford; Konstantin Naumochkin; Nikolay Soroka; Maria Bolshakova; Vladimir Stanishevsky; Sofia Lebedeva
- Directed by: Denis Chervyatsov; Oleg Kuzovkov; Oleg Uzhinov; Marina Nefedova; Olga Baulina; Roman Kozich; Georgiy Orlov; Vladislav Bayramgulov; Natalya Malgina; Andrey Belyaev; Ilya Trusov; Vasily Bogatyrev; Sergey Antonov; Alexander Goncharov; Vasily Bedoshvili
- Voices of: Yulia Zunikova (Masha); Alina Kukushkina (Dasha); Boris Kutnevich & Irina Kukushkina (Bear); Mark Kutnevich (Panda & Rabbit); Eduard Nazarov (Santa Claus)
- Music by: Vasily Bogatyrev
- Opening theme: Masha and the Bear Theme Song
- Country of origin: Russia
- Original language: Russian
- No. of seasons: 7
- No. of episodes: 169 + 2 Specials (list of episodes)

Production
- Producers: Andrey Dobrunov; Oleg Kuzovkov; Dmitry Loveyko; Marina Ratina; Maria Demina; Sergey Martynov; Vladimir Gorbulya
- Animators: Darya Matreshina; Tatyana Bolotnova; Alexey Borzykh; Sergey Kuligin; Sergey Sharigin; Elena Saraeva; Vadim Smaga; Sergey Artyukh; Yana Zavyalova; Michael Milotvorskiy; Mihail Tarasov; Leon Estrin; Elena Tsvetova
- Running time: 7–8 minutes
- Production company: Animaccord Animation Studio

Original release
- Release: 7 January 2009 – present

Masha and the Bear (Russian: Maша и Медвeдь, romanized: Masha i Medved', pronounced [ˈmaʂə ɪ mʲɪdˈvʲetʲ]) is a Russian preschool comedy animated television series created by Oleg Kuzovkov and produced by Animaccord Animation Studio, loosely based on the oral children's folk story of the same name. The series focuses on the adventures of a very young girl named Masha and a bear (whom she dubs "Mishka"), her caring friend who always keeps her safe from disasters.

The episode "Recipe for Disaster" (Russian: Маша плюс каша, romanized: Masha plyus kasha) has over 4.6 billion views on YouTube as of June 2026, making it the site's sixteenth most viewed video of all time.

The show was first launched on 7 January 2009.

The show provides the basis for the Masha and The Bear Land of Laughter, an area with attractions aimed at younger children at the theme park The Land of Legends, near Antalya, Turkey.

== Plot ==
Masha is a four-year-old girl who lives in the forest in an unspecified location in Russia (possibly in Tver Oblast) with her pig, goat, and dog. In the first episode, it is shown that all the animals in the forest are afraid of her, as she is constantly forcing them to play with her. Then Masha sees a butterfly and inadvertently follows it inside the home of the Bear, who has gone fishing. While playing there, she makes a big mess. When he returns, he sees the disaster caused by Masha. The Bear tries to get rid of Masha but after multiple failed attempts, the unlikely duo become friends.

In each episode of the show, Masha is portrayed as a bright little girl who loves exploring the world around her. Masha's shenanigans result in unexpected but entertaining situations that are at the heart of the show's episodes. The kind-hearted Bear is always trying to keep Masha out of trouble. There are several supporting characters in the series, including Masha's cousin Dasha, a penguin adopted by the Bear, a young panda cub from China (the Bear's cousin), two wolves who live in an old UAZ ambulance, a tiger that used to work with the Bear in the circus, and a Female Bear that is the object of the Bear's affections. Characters also include a hare, squirrels and hedgehogs, a pig called Rosie, a goat, and a dog who all live in Masha's front yard.

== Characters ==
=== Main characters ===
==== Masha ====
Masha is a 4-year-old girl who is portrayed as naughty and hyperactive, and always thinks about playing. She lives in a house near a railway station; near her house there is a path that leads to the Bear's house. Masha loves the bear very much, but in her games she tends to create problems for him. She loves sweets, jumping in a bucket, and looking at drawings of her and Bear. Masha's character combines the characteristics of 4-year-old (making grammatical errors when speaking, crying when she is not given what she wants, throwing tantrums) with adult skills (playing tennis, fishing, making preserves, playing electric guitar and speaking perfectly). In the episode "God Save the Queen", it is revealed that Masha has super strength, as she managed to pull a multi-ton train near her house just to give an elephant reception for the Lion King. She is voiced by Alina Kukushkina in Russian, and in English by Elsie Fisher. In subsequent seasons, Masha was dubbed by Rebecca Bloom (ep. 28–39), Angelica Keamy (ep. 40–52), Kaitlyn McCormick (53–78, Masha’s Songs S4 EP 1), Adriana Figuredo (79-84) and now dubbed by West Rubin and Sofia Calasso. She is usually shown wearing a white shirt under a reddish-magenta dress with a reddish-magenta kerchief covering her short blonde hair.

==== Bear ====
The bear is a retired circus brown bear in Moscow who lives in a house hollowed out of a tree in the forest. His past occupation makes him very talented in performing arts (like juggling, unicycling, and even stage magic) although he's also known to dabble into other hobbies and even some intellectual pursuits. Some episodes feature flashbacks in which he remembers his childhood as a cub in the same house. In the Russian-language version, Masha calls him "Mishka" (Russian: Мишка, or named Medved in the intro), a diminutive form of the name Mikhail (i.e. "Mikey"), which is also the traditional name given to bears in Russian tales. He is a huge bear with a big heart and he is Masha's father-like figure, as well as a friendly figure to her. He was voiced by Boris Kutnevich, Denis Naskarov and Irina Kukushkina. He became as pink as he is (a Barbie-styled Bear) with his hair flipped at the end of "Shower Power".

==== Masha's pets ====
A terrier (dog), a goat and a pig (and in the episode "How They Met", three chickens) who live outside Masha's house in her front yard (currently live in a well), but almost every time Masha comes out, they hide themselves to avoid her. The Pig is often forced to play with Masha, who makes it dress up like a baby in a stroller. In the episode "Dance Fever" it is revealed that the pig's name is Rosie. In the episodes "Laundry Day", "Growing Potion", "New Kids on the Block" and other episodes, it is revealed that the pig (Rosie) is a baby.

==== The wild animals ====
The wild animals are a rabbit, red squirrels, hedgehogs and two wolves. Masha and a certain Hare—in "One, two three! Light the Christmas Tree", Father Frost's list calls him 'Bunny' (he was also named Bunny in "Tracks of Unknown Animals" and "No Trespassing"), and in "Surprise! Surprise!" he delivers painted eggs—often play hockey together. Bunny is occasionally an antagonist of the Bear, due to stealing carrots from the Bear's garden. The two Wolves live in a derelict ambulance car on top of a hill, often looking for something to eat, and act as medics for any apparent injuries or illnesses, though they sometimes fear Masha (living in an ambulance cab and acting as medics is a pun on the idiomatic expression, "wolves are orderlies of the woods").

==== Lady Bear ====
The Lady Bear is a female brown bear. The Bear has a crush on her and sometimes goes out of his way to impress her. The first time she rebuffed him in favor of the Black Bear, only to later realize how self-absorbed the Rival Bear is. Another time, she turned her nose up at the Bear's classical guitar playing as she preferred more modern music. Even so, the She-Bear usually opens up to the Bear, such as the time she agreed to have a dinner with him, and she is sometimes kind to Masha, such as giving her a fashion magazine, helping to train her for her tennis match against the Black Bear, and helping her learn to ice-skate.

==== Dasha ====
Dasha is Masha's cousin from Moscow, who looks exactly like Masha, but is more "ladylike", has platinum-blonde hair and blue eyes (Masha's are green), wears boxy, blue-rimmed glasses and a red-orange dress. She is afraid of the Bear and calls him "Shaggy", "Monster" and "Beast". She is voiced by Alina Kukushkina.

==== Panda ====
Panda is a panda cub and the Bear's young cousin from China. He and Masha are rivals, often bickering every time he comes for a visit, but they occasionally get along and have fun together.

=== Recurring characters ===
==== King Lion III ====
A lion wearing a crown, who is a good friend of the bear. He sometimes visits the bear, to play together the game of chess or for collective outdoor adventures. He was always disturbed by Masha, sometimes being advised to him not to help bear as a king is not supposed to help anyone. Once the lion offered his crown to Masha, making her a queen for temporary basis.

==== Whiskers n' Stripes ====
A Siberian tiger who is Bear's best friend from their days performing together in the Moscow circus.

==== Rival Bear ====
A Himalayan black bear, who is Bear's worst enemy and Bear's chief rival for the attentions of the Lady Bear. The Rival Bear has an arrogant and unsportsmanlike personality, cheating to win against Masha in a tennis game, and laughing at her when she grows gigantic. Bear's biggest fear is if Black Bear and Lady Bear marry, which is shown in Game Over when Bear imagines what will happen if he plays games his whole life.

==== Penguin ====
An Adélie penguin that first appears in "The Foundling", as an egg that Masha finds and makes the Bear hatch. The Penguin quickly imprints on the Bear as his parental-figure and the Bear forms a sincere bond with him, but chooses to send the Penguin to live in Antarctica for his own health. Even so, they stay in touch and the Penguin once visited.

==== Santa Claus (Father Frost) ====
Santa Claus appears in Christmas-themed episodes.

==== Four-eyed aliens ====
A trio of alien specimens who accidentally crashed on Earth. They were helped by Bear and Masha to get back to their spaceship.

==== January and Winter ====
They appeared in "The Legend of the Twelve Months". January only appeared in one Season 7 episode.

=== Other Months ===
They also appeared in "The Legend of the Twelve Months". February and March only appeared in "Masha and the Bear Shorties" (April will appear in the 8th season of Masha and the Bear).

==== Tourists ====
They appear in "Princess and the Beast" (as usual appearances, they only did one).

==== Bear Impostor and His Assistant ====
They only appear in two episodes from Season 7.

== Sources ==
According to the project's director, Denis Chervyatsov,

Masha was based on a real person ... In the 1990s, the project's artistic director, Oleg Kuzovkov, was on holiday when he saw a little girl on the beach. The child was so genuine and open that she could easily walk up to a stranger and play chess with him or pick up his flippers and go swimming. However, after a few days, the vacationers began to hide from the girl – she was too active and intrusive.

== Production ==
The series' production has been handled domestically at Animaccord Animation Studio since 2008. The scenario for each episode is written by Oleg Kuzovkov, creator of the cartoon. Then the storyboarding is developed in accordance with the script and, in general, consists of at least 2000 slides. After the team finalizes the plot of an episode, the work for the 2D animatic kicks off. At this stage, animators define the duration of each scene in an episode, how characters are placed in it and interact with each other. After this step of the production is finished, the episode is passed for dubbing. Dubbing must be completed before 3D animation is applied, as the 3D animators need to know the characters' dialogue, intonations, and emotions in advance in order to keep their lip movements synchronized to the audio and make their facial expressions look realistic.

== Actors ==
Masha, her cousin Dasha, and Father Frost are the only characters who speak. The others communicate through gibberish or wordless sounds.

For the first two seasons, Masha's voice in the original Russian version was performed by Alina Kukushkina, who was 6 years old when she began to dub Masha. For the third season (seven years later in 2015), the officials of Animaccord animation studio confirmed that the new voice of Masha would be 6-year-old Barbara Sarantseva and then replaced again by Yulia Zunikova in 2020. The show's sound designer, Boris Kutnevich and Denis Naskarov, provide voices of Bear. Mark Kutnevich provides the voice of Bunny.

For the English version, Elsie Fisher – the voice of Agnes Gru in the Despicable Me films – dubbed the voice of Masha in the first season. In subsequent seasons Masha was dubbed by Rebecca Bloom (ep. 27-39) and Angelica Keamy (ep. 40–52), Kaitlyn McCormick (ep. 53-78), Adriana Figuredo (ep. 78-84) and now dubbed by West Rubin and Sofia Calasso.

== Soundtrack ==
The soundtrack for each episode is written by Russian composer Vasily Bogatyrev. Many compositions are stylized for famous works: Moonlight Sonata, Beethoven's Symphony No. 5, a circus theme from the film Circus, and in the episode "One-Hit Wonder" the rockstar Masha performs a song in the style of the group AC/DC. Most of the songs used in the cartoon, such as the soundtracks of "Laundry Day" and "The Grand Piano Lesson" episodes, became popular in Russia and abroad.

== Reception ==
Within Russia, the influence of Masha and the Bear was the subject of debate. Detractors compared it negatively to Western children's shows and saw Masha's behaviour as setting a bad example for Russian children. Lidia Matveeva, a professor at the Faculty of Psychology at Moscow State University, stated that Masha contradicts "traditional values" about the role of women and fathers in Russian society. She believes that Masha receives positive reinforcement for her disrespect towards the Bear, whom Matveeva described as both a father figure and a representation of Russia, and general disregard for social norms. Conversely, Egor Moskvitin of Ogonyok argued that the show promotes progressive pedagogy, in that it portrays Masha learning from her mistakes through experience and gentle help from the Bear rather than through punishment.

The success of Masha and the Bear abroad was analysed both within and outside Russia. Moskvitin compared the slapstick style to that of Leonid Gaidai and the Marx Brothers, which he believes appeals to a broad range of viewers across the world. Nataliya Vasilyeva of the Associated Press noted the show's popularity in many Muslim countries, particularly Indonesia, and attributed it to Masha's "folk costume with a headscarf". A number of European politicians and media outlets have argued that Masha and the Bear is an instrument of Russian soft power. Priit Hõbemägi, an Estonian journalist and lecturer at Tallinn University, stated that the bear is a symbol commonly associated with Russia and that its portrayal in the show aims to form a positive image of the country in children. Mark Galeotti, a British historian and expert on Russia, argued that fears about Masha and the Bear were greatly exaggerated and risked fueling unnecessary censorship and xenophobic attitudes toward Russian culture. Animaccord stated that their project is independent and they have never received funding from the Russian government. During the ongoing Russo-Ukrainian war, the show is still accessible on YouTube in its Ukrainian-language version and remains highly popular in Ukraine.

== Censorship ==
On 21 August 2026, Ukraine sanctioned Animaccord and other individuals involved in producing and distributing Masha and the Bear for allegedly spreading "pro-Russian narratives" and posing a threat to national security. The decision means that the show could no longer be broadcast in the country. A representative for Animaccord described the accusations as "false and defamatory" and noted that the studio operates independently and has never received funding from the Russian government.

== Awards and achievements ==
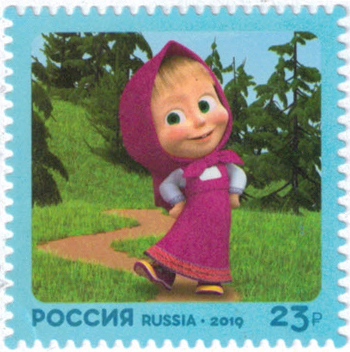
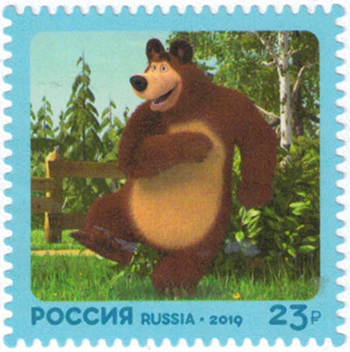
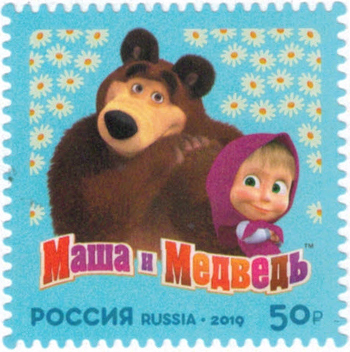
Masha and the Bear on 2019 stamps of Russia
- In January 2015, the cartoon was included into a list of "TV Shows Destined to be Classics", which was compiled by the cartoon industry's periodical Animation Magazine to mark its 250 issue.
- In February 2015, Masha and the Bear won a 2015 Kidscreen Award for Best Animation in the Creative Talent.
- In October 2015, Kidscreen Magazine named Animaccord Animation Studios as one of the top 50 leaders in the world of animation (Kidscreen Hot50) and the top 10 production companies of the year.
- In 2018, the cartoon was included in the Guinness World Records as the most-watched animated video on YouTube, with the episode "Recipe for Disaster" that today counts over 4.4 billion views. The episode was included in the most viewed video of all time, together with such well-known artists as Ed Sheeran with "Shape of You" video and Luis Fonsi ft. Daddy Yankee with "Despacito".

== Mobile apps ==
The first Masha and the Bear mobile app was released by Apps Ministry in August 2011. In 2013 the first mobile game Masha and the Bear: Search and Rescue was published by Apps Ministry. Later more publishers such as Indigo Kids, PSV Studio, Noviy Disk developed and released games and apps featuring Masha and the Bear.

== Distribution ==
Netflix has released 27 of the first 29 episodes in 9 episodes of 3 segments each. Many of the videos were uploaded multiple times on three YouTube channels ("Маша и Медведь", "Get Movies" and "Masha and The Bear") so their view counts across up to three channels have been combined.

== Episodes ==
=== Season 1 ===
Season 1 (2009–2012)
No.	Title	Director	Writer	Airdate
1	How They Met	Denis Chervyatsov	Oleg Kuzovkov	January 13, 2009
2	Don't Wake Till Spring!	Oleg Kuzovkov	Oleg Kuzovkov	March 21,2009
3	One, Two, Three! Light the Christmas Tree!	Oleg Uzhinov	Oleg Kuzovkov	December 30,2009
4	Tracks of Unknown Animals	Oleg Uzhinov	Oleg Kuzovkov	January 14,2010
5	Prances with Wolves	Oleg Kuzovkov	Oleg Kuzovkov	January 21,2010
6	Jam Day	Oleg Uzhinov	Oleg Kuzovkov	January 28,2010
7	Springtime for Bear	Marina Nefedova	Oleg Kuzovkov	March 18,2010
8	Gone Fishing	Denis Chervyatsov	Oleg Kuzovkov	March 25,2010
9	Call Me Please!	Marina Nefedova	Oleg Kuzovkov	April 8,2010
10	Holiday on Ice	Denis Chervyatsov, Oleg Kuzovkov	Oleg Kuzovkov	November 21,2010
11	First Day of School	Olga Baulina	Oleg Kuzovkov	November 28,2010
12	No Trespassing!	Marina Nefedova	Oleg Kuzovkov	December 5,2010
13	Hide and Seek Is Not for the Weak	Oleg Uzhinov	Oleg Kuzovkov	December 12,2010
14	Watch Out!	Denis Chervyatsov	Oleg Kuzovkov	December 19,2010
15	Little Cousin	Oleg Kuzovkov	Oleg Kuzovkov	January 3,2011
16	Get Well Soon!	Olga Baulina	Oleg Kuzovkov	January 17,2011
17	Recipe for Disaster	Oleg Uzhinov	Oleg Kuzovkov	January 24,2011
18	Laundry Day	Oleg Uzhinov	Oleg Kuzovkov	February 14,2011
19	The Grand Piano Lesson	Oleg Kuzovkov	Oleg Kuzovkov	February 21,2011
20	Stripes and Whiskers	Roman Kozich	Oleg Kuzovkov	February 28,2011
21	Home Alone	Oleg Uzhinov	Oleg Kuzovkov	April 18,2011
22	Hold Your Breath	Georgiy Orlov	Oleg Kuzovkov	June 13,2011
23	The Foundling	Roman Kozich	Oleg Kuzovkov	August 1,2011
24	Bon Appétit!	Vladislav Bayramgulov	Oleg Kuzovkov	September 26,2011
25	Hokus-Pokus	Georgiy Orlov	Oleg Kuzovkov	October 24,2011
26	Home Improvement	Natalya Malgina	Oleg Uzhinov, Denis Chervyatsov	December 19,2011

=== Season 2 ===
Season 2 (2012–2015)
No. overall	No. in season	Title	Netflix sequence	Russia viewers (millions)
27	1	Picture Perfect	2.1.1	3. 54
28	2	Time to Ride My Pony	1.9.3	2. 71
29	3	One-Hit Wonder	1.9.1	2. 60
30	4	Growing Potion	2.1.3	3. 71
31	5	Swept Away	2.1.2	1. 22
32	6	All In the Family	2.3.3	3. 19
33	7	La Dolce Vita	2.2.1	9. 05
34	8	Just Shoot Me	3.7.3	2. 12
35	9	Kidding Around	2.2.2	1. 53
36	10	Two Much	2.4.3	5. 18
37	11	Bon Voyage	2.2.3	2. 03
38	12	Trading Places Day	2.3.2	2. 04
39	13	The Thriller Night	2.7.2	2. 09
40	14	Terrible Power	2.4.1	3. 19
41	15	Hat Trick	2.4.2	2. 67
42	16	And Action!	2.5.1	2. 05
43	17	Self-Made Hero	2.7.1	3. 23
44	18	Once In a Year	2.3.1	3. 09
45	19	The Puzzling Case	2.5.3	1. 67
46	20	Dance Fever	2.7.3	2. 36
47	21	Victory Cry	2.5.2	3. 93
48	22	Sabre-Toothed Bear	2.8.1	3. 02
49	23	Variety Show	2.6.3	3. 27
50	24	Happy Harvest	2.8.2	4. 64
51	25	Home-Grown Ninjas	2.6.1	5. 81
52	26	See You Later	2.8.3	4. 07

=== Season 3 ===
Season 3 (2015–2019)
No. overall	No. in season	Title	Netflix sequence	Russia viewers (millions)
53	1	Coming Back Ain't Easy	3.1.1	1. 98
54	2	The Very Fairy Tale	3.1.2	3. 16
55	3	Driving Lessons	3.2.1	3. 28
56	4	A Ghost Story	3.2.3	1. 47
57	5	Liar, Liar, Pants on Fire!	3.3.2	1. 69
58	6	Like Cat and Mouse	3.2.2	2. 28
59	7	Game Over	3.4.2	1. 49
60	8	At Your Service	3.4.1	3. 10
61	9	Christmas Carol	3.4.3	1. 82
62	10	Rock-a-Bye, Baby!	3.1.3	3. 78
63	11	Surprise! Surprise!	3.3.1	6. 34
64	12	The Three Mashketeers	3.3.3	1. 14
65	13	We Come In Peace!	3.6.3	0. 96
66	14	Tee for Three	3.8.1	0. 85
67	15	Best Medicine	3.6.1	2. 12
68	16	Quartet Plus	3.6.4	0. 88
69	17	New Kids on the Block!	3.7.1	1. 34
70	18	Twinkle, Twinkle, Little Star	3.5.1	3. 08
71	19	What a Wonderful Game	3.8.3	TBA
72	20	That's Your Cue!	3.6.2	0. 84
73	21	Fishy Story	3.7.2	1. 36
74	22	Monkey Business	3.7.4	1. 38
75	23	God Save the Queen!	3.5.3	0. 98
76	24	All the World's a Stage	3.5.2	0. 69
77	25	Around the World in One Day	3.8.2	0. 33
78	26	Who Am I?	3.8.4	0. 43

=== Season 4 ===
Season 4 (2019–2020) (Masha's Songs)
No. overall	No. in season	Title	Director	Writer	2D director
79	1	Where All Love to Sing	Denis Chervyatsov	Denis Chervyatsov	Rinat Gazizov
80	2	Practice In Childhood - Das Ist Gut!	Georgiy Orlov	Denis Chervyatsov	Vasily Volkov
81	3	Pink of Fashion	Ilya Trusov	Marina Sycheva	Rinat Gazizov
82	4	No Work All Carnival	Andrey Belyaev	Denis Chervyatsov, Ernest Kataev	Rinat Gazizov
83	5	The Secret of Mashuko	Georgiy Orlov	Hunter Cope	Vasily Volkov
84	6	From England with Love	Natalya Malgina	Marina Sycheva	Vasily Volkov, Irina Kovrigo
85	7	Happy New Year... Again!	Roman Kozich	Greg Nix	Vasily Volkov
86	8	When Cacti Bloom	Ilya Trusov	Greg Nix	Rinat Gazizov
87	9	Spanish Tunes	Andrey Belyaev	Marina Sycheva	Rinat Gazizov
88	10	Once In the Wild West	Vladislav Bayramgulov, Denis Chervyatsov	Hunter Cope	Rinat Gazizov
89	11	Tales from the East	Georgiy Orlov	Marina Sycheva	Rinat Gazizov
90	12	Almost Ancient Greek Story	Roman Kozich	Alex Budovsky, Denis Chervyatsov	Vasily Volkov
91	13	The Magic Flute	Natalya Malgina	Marina Sycheva	Vasily Volkov, Artyom Kmet

=== Season 5 ===
Season 5 (2020–2022)
No. overall	No. in season	Title	Netflix sequence	Russia viewers (millions)
92	1	Something Yummy	5.1.1	TBA
93	2	Big Hike	5.4.2	TBA
94	3	What's Inside?	5.1.3	TBA
95	4	The First Swallow	5.3.2	TBA
96	5	Honey Day	5.2.1	TBA
97	6	Mushroom Rain	5.2.2	TBA
98	7	Tour de Forest	5.4.3	TBA
99	8	Finders Keepers	5.2.3	TBA
100	9	Berry Naughty	5.3.1	TBA
101	10	Mind Your Manners	5.4.1	TBA
102	11	Treasure Island	5.3.3	TBA
103	12	Masha Knows Best	5.1.2	TBA
104	13	Who's the Boss?	5.3.4	TBA
105	14	Pasta La Vista	5.8.3	TBA
106	15	Love Is In the Bear	5.6.2	TBA
107	16	Wish Upon a Star	5.5.2	TBA
108	17	Firefighter of the Day	5.5.1	TBA
109	18	Awesome Blossoms	5.7.2	TBA
110	19	Sleeping Beauties	5.8.4	TBA
111	20	Try, Try Again	5.8.1	TBA
112	21	How to Train Your Plant?	5.5.3	TBA
113	22	The Mystery Guest	5.6.3	TBA
114	23	Unbearable Beach	5.7.1	TBA
115	24	Princess or Dragon?	5.6.1	TBA
116	25	Sudden Turn	5.8.2	TBA
117	26	Happily Feather After	5.7.3	TBA

=== Season 6 ===
Season 6 (2022–2024)
No. overall	No. in season	Title	Netflix sequence	Russia viewers (millions)
118	1	When a Pig Flies	TBA	TBA
119	2	All You Need Is a Goal	TBA	TBA
120	3	Soup Pursuit	TBA	TBA
121	4	Tricky Tricks	TBA	TBA
122	5	Think Outside the Box	TBA	TBA
123	6	Well-Beeing	TBA	TBA
124	7	Knock-Knock-Knock	TBA	TBA
125	8	Unfriended?	TBA	TBA
126	9	Shower Power	TBA	TBA
127	10	Fisherman's Luck	TBA	TBA
128	11	Like Mother, Like Daughter	TBA	TBA
129	12	Blown Away	TBA	TBA
130	13	Who's Gifted?	TBA	TBA
131	14	Who's the Better Leader?	TBA	TBA
132	15	A Little Magic	TBA	TBA
133	16	Fluffy Dessert	TBA	TBA
134	17	Dasha's Purple Song	TBA	TBA
135	18	Rosie's Back Tower	TBA	TBA
136	19	A Pineapple of Discord	TBA	TBA
137	20	Where Did It Goat?	TBA	TBA
138	21	It's No Slice of Heaven	TBA	TBA
139	22	Lilac Picnic	TBA	TBA
140	23	Welcome Out of Here	TBA	TBA
141	24	Rosie Alone	TBA	TBA
142	25	La-La-Lamb	TBA	TBA
143	26	Candy Masha	TBA	TBA

=== Season 7 ===
Season 7 (2023–2025)
No. overall	No. in season	Title	Date release	Year
144	1	Принцесса и чудовище	7 сентября	2023
145	2	Картонные спасатели	5 октября	2023
146	3	На счастье!	2 ноября	2023
147	4	День творчества	16 ноября	2023
148	5	Много шума и ничего	11 января	2024
149	6	Ты ж моя лапочка	15 марта	2024
150	7	А с собакой лучше	18 апреля	2024
151	8	Добро пожаловать в "гранд ують"!	30 мая	2024
152	9	Лимонная лихорадка	11 июля	2024
153	10	Осторожно, двери закрываются!	22 августа	2024
154	11	Идёт коза рогатая	3 октября	2024
155	12	Дело было в январе	28 ноября	2024
156	13	Звуки музыки	23 января	2025
157	14	Любит-не-любит	13 февраля	2025
158	15	У страха глаза велики	27 февраля	2025
159	16	Штангу! Штангу!	13 марта	2025
160	17	1 апреля - никому не верю!	27 марта	2025
161	18	Летучий корабль	10 апреля	2025
162	19	Прыг-скок пёс	24 апреля	2025
163	20	Затерянный мир	8 мая	2025
164	21	Туманная история	22 мая	2025
165	22	Всадник без головы	5 июня	2025
166	23	Книжка-лягушка	19 июня	2025
167	24	Скользкий тип	3 июля	2025
168	25	Зуб даю!	17 июля	2025
169	26	Умный в гору не пойдёт	7 августа	2025

=== Shorties ===
Shorties (2023)
No.	Title	Netflix sequence	Russian viewers (millions)
1	Amusement Rides	TBA	TBA
2	Toy Store	TBA	TBA
3	Superpizza	TBA	TBA
4	Airport	TBA	TBA
5	Fashion	TBA	TBA
6	Cinema	TBA	TBA

=== Specials ===
Specials (2022–2023)
No.	Title	Netflix sequence	Russian viewers (millions)
1	The Legend of the 12 Months	TBA	TBA
2	Say Cheese!	TBA	TBA

== International versions ==
- English (United States; all English-speaking countries) – Masha and the Bear
  - Teletoon (2016–2017)
  - Treehouse TV (2017–2020)
  - Universal Kids (2017–2025)
  - Disney Junior
  - Tiny Pop (2017–2026)
  - Pop Plus
  - Kabillion
  - ABC Kids
  - DreamWorks Channel
  - Netflix
  - Cartoonito
  - National Communications Network
  - A2Z (2021, 2023, 2026–present)
  - All TV (2026–present)
  - Kapamilya Channel (2022, 2026–present)
  - Yey! (13–30 June 2020)
  - iWantTFC (2020; 2023)
  - Cartoonito
- French (Canada) – Masha et Michka
  - Télé-Québec (formerly)
  - Télétoon (formerly)
- French (France) – Masha et Michka
  - Piwi+
  - France 5 (Zouzous block)
  - RTBF
  - La Trois
- German (Germany) – Mascha und der Bär
  - KiKA
  - Boomerang (formerly)
  - ORF 1 (formerly)
  - SRF 1
  - SRF zwei (formerly)
- Swiss German (Switzerland) – Mascha und dä Bär
  - SRF 1
- Greek (Greece) - Η Μάσα και ο Αρκούδος
  - Boomerang (formerly)
  - Star Channel
- Ukrainian – Маша та Ведмідь
  - 1+1 (formerly)
  - PlusPlus (formerly)
  - ТЕТ (formerly)
- Hungarian, Czech, Serbian, Romanian, Slovene
  - Minimax
- Urdu (Pakistan)
  - LTN Family
- Vietnamese
  - K+
- Arabic (Middle East And North Africa) – ماشا و الدب
  - Spacetoon (2015–present)
- Indonesian
  - ANTV (2013; 2023–2025)
  - VTV Indonesia (2023–present)
  - Kids TV (2022-present)

Masha and the Bear left Universal Kids in the US on 1 January 2023, but cable TV providers like Charter Spectrum and DirecTV state that it is still there, and also streaming services like FuboTV, YouTube TV, Hulu with Live TV, and DirecTV Stream. The show returned to Universal Kids in the US from 4 August 2023 until the Universal Kids' closure on 6 March 2025.

== Spin-offs ==
=== Masha's Tales ===
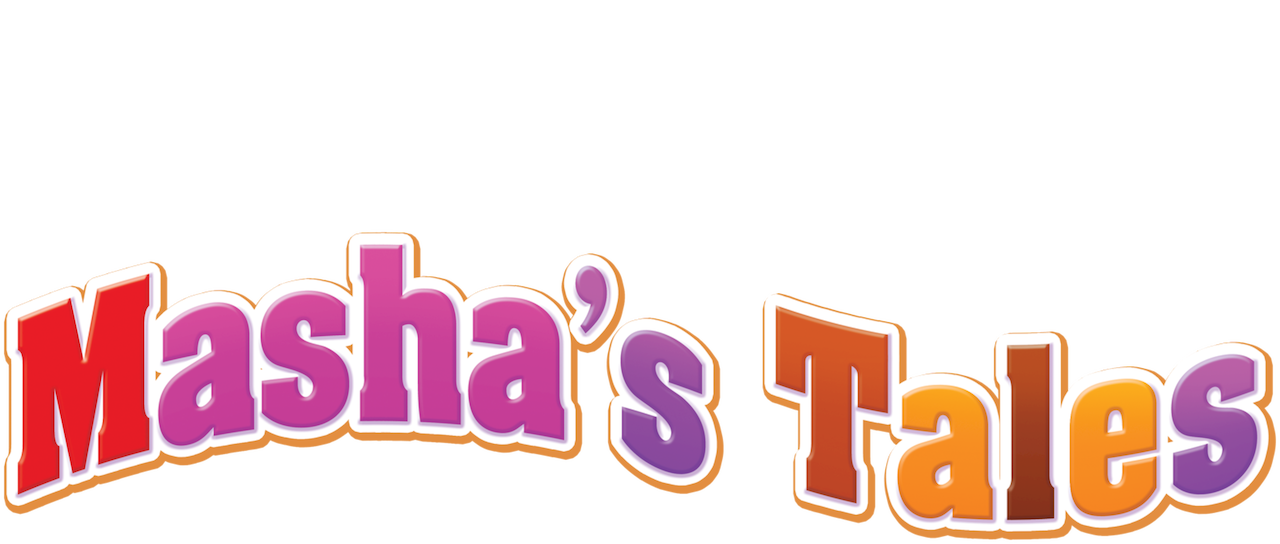
Logo of Masha's Tales

A spin-off series to the show titled Masha's Tales is also available on Netflix. In the show Masha (voiced by a much older actress) tells classic Russian fairy tales as well as some Grimms' Fairy Tales to her toys. However, Masha makes up her own way of telling the stories (Such as putting a magical nutcracker who turns into a prince when she adapts Cinderella). She also mixes up the morals of the stories by often adding an additional ending so that way it could fit with what she is telling her toys. Masha's Tales premiered on Cartoon Network UK's sister pre-school channel, Cartoonito, on 20 June 2016.

Debut dates listed per Treehouse TV:

No.	Title	Director
1	The Wolf and the Seven Young Kids	Denis Chervyatsov
2	The Magic Swan Geese	Denis Chervyatsov
3	The Fox and the Rabbit	23 October 2017
4	Red Riding Hood	24 October 2017
5	Father Frost	25 October 2017
6	The Wolf and the Fox	26 October 2017
7	The Tops and the Roots	27 October 2017
8	The Frog Princess	28 October 2017
9	The Snow Maiden	28 October 2017
10	Tom Thumb	29 October 2017
11	Wee Little Havroshechka	29 October 2017
12	The Straw Bull-Calf	30 October 2017
13	Three Little Pigs	30 October 2017
14	The Valiant Little Taylor	11:27 7 February 2018
15	Ali Baba	26 November 2017
16	Cinderella	1 November 2017
17	Caliph Stork	11:20 am 9 February 2018
18	Jack and the Beanstalk	2 November 2017 (reruns 9 February 2018 at 11:27 am)
19	The Swineherd	11:20 am 11 February 2018
20	Bluebeard	11:27 am 11 February 2018
21	By the Pike's Wish	11:20 am 12 February 2018
22	The Fox and the Rolling Pin	11:27 am 12 February 2018
23	Axe Porridge	11:20 am 13 February 2018
24	Go I Know Not Whither (TV guides misspell "Whither" as "Wither")	11:27 am 13 February 2018
25	The Golden Cockerel	11:20 am 14 February 2018
26	The Humpbacked Horse	11:27 am 14 February 2018

=== Masha's Spooky Stories ===
Masha's Spooky Stories premiered on Cartoonito UK and Netflix on Halloween 2016.

Debuts dates listed are for English releases in Canada on Treehouse TV, original air dates in Russia unknown:

No.	Title	Original release date
1	Soul Freezing Tale of Grim Forest and Tiny Timid Bug	11:20 am 15 February 2018
2	Super Scary Story of a Little Boy Who Was Afraid of Washing	11:27 am 15 February 2018
3	Terrifying True Story About Monsters and Those Who Fear Them	11:20 am 16 February 2018
4	Troubled Fable About a Kitten Who Was Lost But Found	11:27 am 16 February 2018
5	Nightmarish Kids Belief About Christmas Rhymes (aka "A ghastly belief about New Year verselet")	11:20 am 17 February 2018
6	Grim Parable About Superstitious Girl (aka "A gloomy parable of a superstitious girl")	11:27 am 17 February 2018
7	Grim Testament About One Snotty Boy (aka "A gloomy covenant about a snotty boy")	11:20 am 18 February 2018
8	Grim Tale About One Girl Who Was Afraid of Animals	11:27 am 18 February 2018
9	Horrifying Story of Grandmother and Grandson (aka "A horrific story about a Grandma and her Grandson")	11:20 am 20 February 2018
10	A Myth Full of Grief and Despair About One Historical Error (aka "A full of despair myth about a historical mistake")	11:27 am 20 February 2018
11	Panic Unbearable Legend About the Insects	11:20 am 21 February 2018
12	Troubled Story About Baba-yaga	11:27 am 21 February 2018
13	Sinister Saga of a Sick Tummy and a Girl Who Was Afraid of Doctors	11:20 am 22 February 2018
14	Fantastic Story About a Hedgehog, a Boy and Green Humanoids	11:27 am 22 February 2018
15	Horrible True Story of How a Boy Was Transferred to Another School	11:20 am 23 February 2018
16	A Terrible Tale About a Cow Herder on a Stump	11:27 am 23 February 2018
17	A Ghost Bike Saga Which Makes You Shiver	11:20 am 24 February 2018
18	Scary Story About Spooky Stories (A classic spooky story.)	11:27 am 24 February 2018
19	Creepy Tale About Useful Inventions (A spooky story about useful inventions.)	11:20 am 25 February 2018
20	Gloomy Story About the Darkest Dreams (Computer games with monsters.)	11:27 am 25 February 2018
21	Terrible Legend About Thunder and Lightning (A story about thunder and lightning.)	11:20 am 26 February 2018
22	Terrible Truth About Those Who Are Afraid to Be Little (A story about being little.)	11:27 am 27 February 2018
23	Bloodcurdling Saga about Joyful Event (Hearing news about joyful events.)	11:20 am 27 February 2018
24	Monstrous Tale about Tall and Short (Masha discovers a strange law of nature.)	11:27 am 27 February 2018
25	Frightening Incident at the Circus (A scary story about a strange clown.)	11:20 am 28 February 2018
26	Shocking Story About a Girl Who Was Afraid of Everything (A story about a girl who is afraid of everything.)	11:27 am 28 February 2018

== See also ==
- List of most-viewed YouTube videos
- Be-Be-Bears
- List of most-subscribed YouTube channels
