= World Pool Championship =

World Pool Championship may refer to:

== Active events ==
- WPA World Nine-ball Championship, first contested in 1990
- WPA World Artistic Pool Championship, first contested in 2000
- WPA World Eight-ball Championship, first contested in 2004
- WPA World Blackball Championship, first contested in 2006
- WPA World Ten-ball Championship, first contested in 2008
- World Team Championship (pool), first contested in 2010

== Dormant events ==
- World Straight Pool Championship, last contested in 2010
- WPA World Pyramid Pool Championship, last contested in 2019

== See also ==
- World Pool-Billiard Association
- Matchroom Sport
- World Cup of Pool
- World Pool Masters
