= Paul Bouche =

American television host

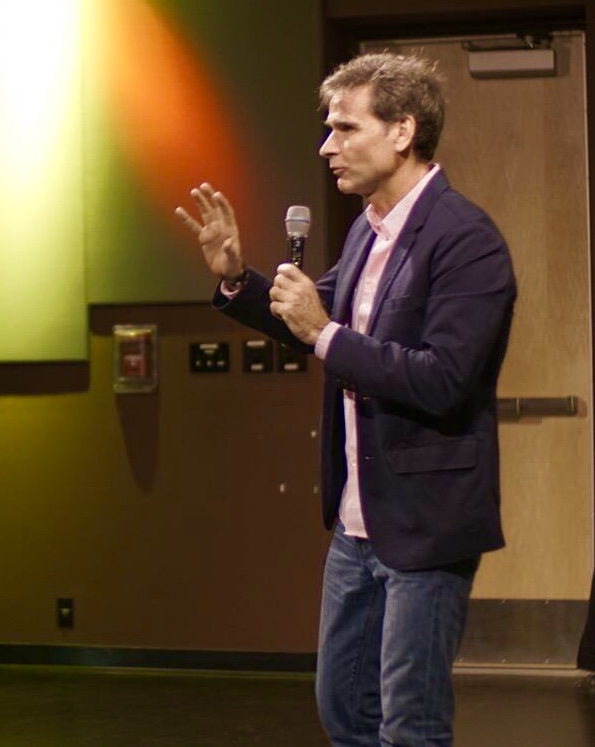
- Paul Bouche at the Premier of Offside 2018
- Born: February 13, 1970 (age 56); San Juan, Puerto Rico
- Occupations: Television Personality & Producer
- Years active: 1991-present
- Television: Offside! La Boca Loca de Paul, A Oscuras Pero Encendidos, La Tijera, Arriba Con Paul, Sobre Ruedas
- Website: www.astracanada.com

Paul Bouche (born February 13, 1970) is an Emmy Award Winning American television host, comedian, media personality and television producer. He is the host, creator and producer of a variety of television and radio programs as well as the face and producer of a YouTube Channel. He is Chief Creative Officer of Astracanada Productions, a Media Production Company based in Miami Florida since 1995. Bouche has worked as a TV and radio host and comedian in the United States and Latin America. He is best known for creating and hosting the television show A Oscuras Pero Encendidos from 1995 to 2001. He launched "La Boca Loca de Paul," in 2007, a daily variety show originated in Miami which continues to air in syndication in various markets in the United States, Puerto Rico and Latin America.

== Career ==
Bouche produced and hosted A Oscuras Pero Encendidos (In The Dark But Turned On) from 1995 until 2001. It was the first Late Night Show specifically designed for the US Hispanic Market. In 1997, he received an Emmy Award from the National Academy of Television Arts and Sciences.

After starting as a local Miami production, in 1998 Galavisión (Univision's cable network) signed a distribution deal to carry A Oscuras Pero Encendidos via cable TV to national Hispanic audiences in the United States. In June 2000 the Telemundo Network signed the show for National TV broadcast in America and Puerto Rico./ Led by Paul A Oscuras Pero Encendidos, spent 6 years on the air.

In 2000, Bouche launched the humorous talk show "Sobre Ruedas" for WQBA 1140AM, a Univision Radio station in the city of Miami. In September 2001, he launched the national morning drive show "Arriba Con Paul" for the Radio Unica Network reaching 80% of the Hispanic market in the United States.

In 2004, Paul hosted the Spanish language version of the British television comedy talk show So Graham Norton co-produced by So Television, Zeal Entertainment and Astracanada Productions Inc. in London. In 2006, he hosted the “Advertising Age Hispanic creative Advertising Awards” gala.

In 2007, Bouche returned to television with La Boca Loca De Paul (Paul's Crazy Mouth) a daily variety and comedy talk show. Since its inception the show generated substantial rating increases in its time period. In 2009, he was tapped by Univision's sister Network Telefutura to help launch and co-host of the national TV gossip show entitled La Tijera.

In 2011, "La Boca Loca De Paul" launched nationally in the US and Puerto Rico through Mega TV and in the Dominican Republic. The format scored top ratings for the station in the 18-49 and 25 to 54 demographics.

In 2012, Bouche conducted an international media seminar in San Jose, Costa Rica attended by 20 media companies. In 2014, he was invited by the Association of Independent Commercial Producers AICP to co-dictate the seminar "Advertising and Entertainment: a combined world of ideas"

In 2018, Bouche developed and produced an online and TV series Offside, a Sports Entertainment Late-night Variety Comedy Show. In 2020, in celebration of the 25th Anniversary of Astracanada Productions Inc, Bouche launched their first exclusive You tube channel with daily clips from content owned by the company In a little over one year the Youtube channel garnered over one million views with its largest share of audience with young viewers in the 18 to 34 demographic.

In 2023 Astracanada announced the release of the first episode of original VOD series entitled "Historias de la Televisión de A Oscuras Pero Encendidos". The webisode's release coincided with the launch of the Disney / Star+ Docuseries El Comandante Fort.

== Awards ==
Bouche received an Emmy Award from the National Academy of Television Arts and Sciences for television work in 1997.

He received the Keyes to the City of Miami in 1998. In 1999 US Congresswoman Ileana Ros-Lehtinen recognized Bouche with the US Capitol Flag in recognition of his contributions to the industry of Spanish language TV in America.
