= Animaccord =

Animation studio

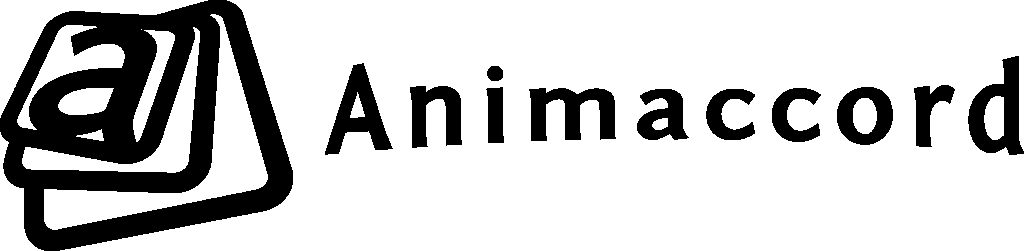
- Type: Private
- Founded: June 6, 2008
- Headquarters: Limassol, Cyprus
- Key people: Claus Tømming†, (Note: Deceased. "Remembering CEO of Animaccord, Claus Tomming". License Global. 16 July 2025.) CEO; Elena Shchichkina, COO
- Products: Masha and the Bear, Masha and the Bear Specials, Spin-offs, Thematic, Fairyteens, Masha and the Three Bears
- Website: www.animaccord.com

Animaccord is an animation studio that develops, produces and distributes animated cartoons.

The company became recognised for its hit animated property, Masha and the Bear that currently tops most in-demand shows for preschoolers worldwide; it also holds the Guinness World Records' title as the most-watched cartoon on YouTube.

== Film ==
- Masha and the Bear (2009–present)

== See also ==
- History of animation
- List of animated feature films
