= Vidgo =

American streaming television service

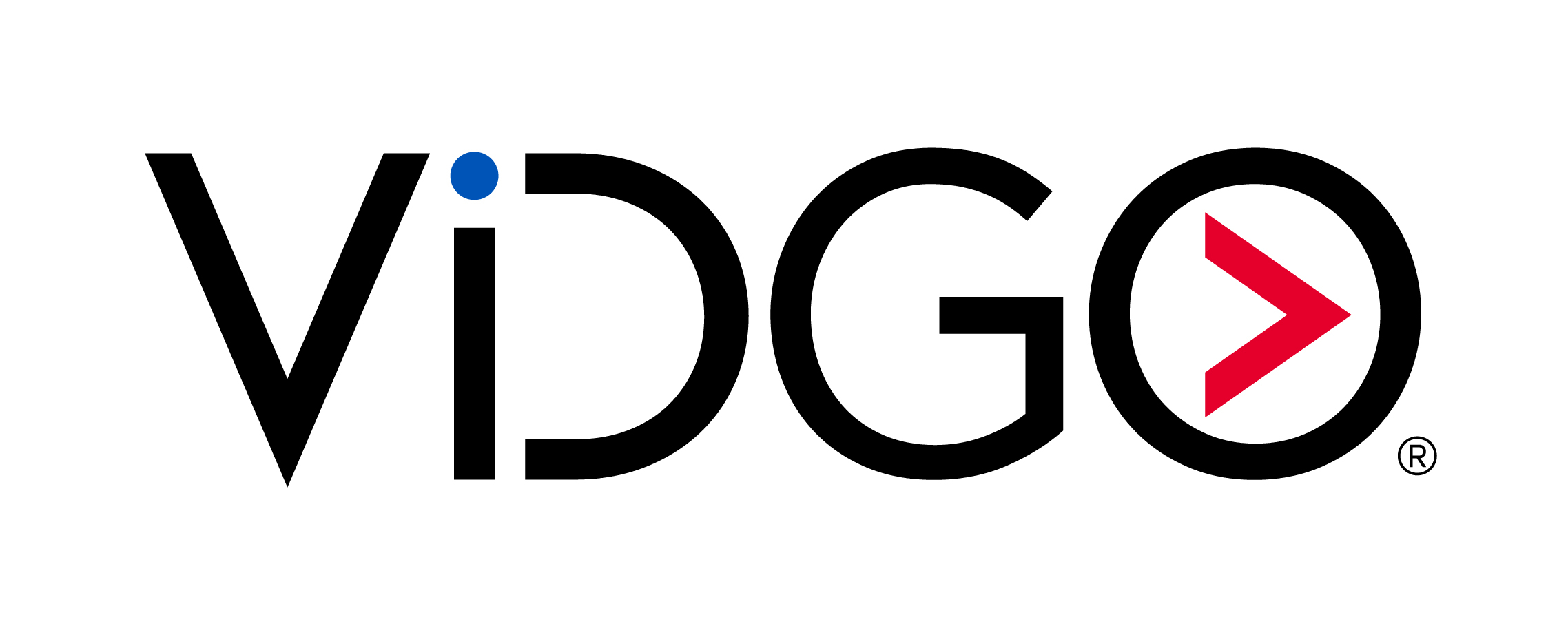
- Industry: Pay television
- Founded: 2018
- Founder: Shane Cannon
- Fate: Defunct
- Headquarters: Salt Lake City, Utah, U.S.
- Key people: Derek Mattsson (CEO), Bill Feininger (COO)
- Services: Streaming television
- Website: vidgotv.com (Website outdated)

Vidgo was an American streaming television service that offered over 100 channels of English- and Spanish-language sports, news and general entertainment content. In addition to its live television packages, Vidgo offered a cloud-based digital video recorder and thousands of hours of on-demand programming.

== History ==
Vidgo launched in 2018 as a streaming service focused on professional sports, primarily soccer, to cord cutters. Over time, the service expanded to include agreements with major television content providers, including A+E Networks, the Walt Disney Company, Fox Corporation, Paramount Global, Sony Pictures Television and Discovery Communications. Their number of subscribers was estimated to be between 25,000 and 100,000 as of 2021.

In 2022, the company hired a new executive leadership team and revamped its mission to provide entertainment, news and sports of interest to the heartland of the United States. It also relaunched its streaming app with a new color palette, logo and other interface improvements.

In April 2023, Vidgo quietly raised the prices of two English-language packages. The price puts Vidgo on the same footing as YouTube TV, Hulu with Live TV and Fubo TV.

On September 29, 2023, Harmonic Inc. pulled support for Vidgo apps after the company ran out of money to pay the vendor. Vidgo sent an email to subscribers saying the outage would be solved eventually. However, as of March 2024, it was no longer possible to sign-up for Vidgo.

== Programming partners ==
Vidgo had a number of programming partners that offered live channels and on-demand content through the service, including:

- Altice USA (Cheddar News, i24 News)
- Curiosity Stream
- The First TV
- Fox Corporation
- INSP
- Newsmax TV
- Nexstar Media Group (NewsNation)
- One America News
- Pac-12 Networks
- Paramount Global (legacy Viacom networks)
- Qurate Retail Group (HSN, QVC)
- Sinclair Broadcast Group
- Sony Pictures Television
- TelevisaUnivision
- The Walt Disney Company
- Warner Bros. Discovery (legacy Discovery Communications networks)

== Supported devices ==
Vidgo was available on most popular smart television devices, including:

- Amazon Fire TV
- Android TV / Google TV
- Android devices (Android phones, Android tablets)
- Apple TV
- Apple iOS devices (iPhone, iPad)
- Roku

Channels and on-demand content were available to stream through most popular web browsers, including Microsoft Edge, Google Chrome and Mozilla Firefox, via the Vidgo website.
