= DirecTV Stream =

American streaming television service

- Final logo used from 2021 to 2025
- Formerly: DirecTV Now (2016–2019); AT&T TV (2019–2021)
- Type: Division
- Industry: Pay television
- Founded: November 30, 2016; 9 years ago
- Defunct: April 13, 2025
- Headquarters: El Segundo, California, U.S.
- Area served: United States
- Services: OTT Internet Television
- Parent: DirecTV

DirecTV Stream (formerly DirecTV Now and AT&T TV) was a premium streaming multichannel television service offered in the United States by DirecTV.

The brand offered pay television service without a contract, with the service utilizing a customer's existing streaming TV hardware, such as a Roku or Amazon Fire TV device, and was also available on some smart TV systems like Tizen OS by Samsung, WebOS by LG and Vizio SmartCast, as well as on phones and tablets.

The service was similar to DirecTV via Internet, a streaming version of DirecTV's flagship satellite service, which required a multi-year contract and included an Android TV box called "Gemini." Unlike DirecTV via Internet, DirecTV Stream did not require a contract, and the Gemini device was optional. Channel packages between DirecTV via Internet and DirecTV Stream were mostly the same, though DirecTV via Internet offered a few broadcast and cable networks that were not available on DirecTV Stream. Additionally, DirecTV Stream's pricing was lower compared to DirecTV via Internet, which charged regional sports and equipment lease fees.

DirecTV via Internet customers were able to watch programming from their subscription through the DirecTV app on other platforms, which was also used for DirecTV Stream.

== History ==
DirecTV Stream launched as DirecTV Now on November 30, 2016.

On July 13, 2017, it was reported that AT&T was preparing to introduce a cloud-based DVR streaming service as part of its effort to create a unified platform across the DirecTV satellite television service and DirecTV Now services, with U-verse to be added soon.

In March 2019, DirecTV Now instituted a new package structure for new subscribers with fewer channels included (although with HBO now included in the base package), and increased pricing for all subscribers. By the second quarter of 2019, DirecTV Now lost 168,000 subscribers (decreasing to 1.3 million), with AT&T citing "higher prices and less promotional activity" as reasoning.

On July 30, 2019, AT&T announced an upcoming streaming television service known as AT&T TV, which would feature an Android TV-based set-top box with a Google Assistant-based voice remote, use the same apps used by DirecTV Now, and offer cloud DVR with 500 hours of storage. Unlike DirecTV Now, this service is sold on a contract basis (and in bundles with AT&T Internet), and requires the rental or purchase of proprietary set-top boxes. The service allows user self-installation, but activation fees are still charged. AT&T CEO Randall Stephenson referred to AT&T TV as a "workhorse" service succeeding DirecTV and AT&T U-verse in its pay television business. The service was initially launched in selected markets in California, Florida, Kansas, Missouri, and Texas, with additional markets to follow. Concurrently it was announced that DirecTV Now would re-brand as "AT&T TV Now". The similar names between the different services have been noted as possibly causing confusion, with media outlets even citing examples occurring within the company itself.

In September 2019, a class action lawsuit was filed against AT&T, alleging that it had falsely inflated its reported number of AT&T TV Now subscribers by engaging in "unrelenting pressure and strong-arm tactics" and giving unwanted subscriptions to the service to customers without their consent, as well as making false claims surrounding risks related to the service in its SEC filings related to the purchase of Time Warner.

On February 25, 2021, AT&T announced that it would spin off DirecTV, U-Verse and AT&T TV into a separate entity, selling a 30% stake to TPG Capital while retaining a 70% stake in the new standalone company. The deal was closed on August 2, 2021, at which point the provider adopted its current name.

In December 2022, DirecTV Stream announced it would raise prices to offset higher costs associated with distributing broadcast and cable networks to users. The price increases rolled out on January 22, 2023, with most customers paying between $5 and $10 extra for channels they already received. It was the second consecutive year DirecTV Stream raised prices on customers.

On April 13, 2025, DirecTV announced the end of DirecTV Stream as a standalone brand and merged its content with its regular DirecTV service.

== Past services ==
=== AT&T TV Now ===
The service's base package "Entertainment" (included channels from co-owned division WarnerMedia as well as the seven other major television conglomerates: The Walt Disney Company, Fox Corporation, NBCUniversal, Discovery, A&E Networks, AMC Networks, and ViacomCBS. The "Premiere" package adds HBO, Cinemax, Showtime, Starz, and StarzEncore, and the various additional sports channels.

Previous packages started at $35.00 "Live a Little" (Replaced by "Entertainment") and ranged up to $70 "Gotta Have it" (Replaced by "Gotta Have It") these packages are no longer available, but are still accessible to existing subscribers. The packages currently offer the same channels as prior packages, just at a higher premium.

On March 2, 2020, AT&T TV launched nationally. AT&T president John Stankey stated that AT&T TV would be promoted as the company's main pay television service, with DirecTV being downplayed outside of markets with insufficient broadband quality to use AT&T TV. AT&T TV Now would struggle through 2019, with a loss of 138,000 subscribers in 2020 Q1 according to its quarterly earnings report. The service as a whole was down to 788,000 subscribers, compared to its peak of 1.86 million subscribers, before the large discounts to attract initial subscriber interest were scaled back.

On January 12, 2021, AT&T discontinued their Plus and Max plans to new subscribers, shifting them towards new AT&T TV packages (starting at $69.99). The packages are $15 more expensive than the previous base package, and includes channels owned by AMC Networks, Discovery Inc. and A+E Networks.

On January 13, 2021, AT&T announced it would stop selling AT&T TV Now to new customers, and instead redirect new and existing customers to AT&T TV. Per the AT&T TV Now website, there are no long-term contracts for AT&T TV and compatible consumer devices can be used.

The final iteration of the service consisted of four main bundles, including the base "Entertainment" service, "Choice" (which adds regional sports networks), "Ultimate", and "Premier".

== See also ==
- DGO
- IPTV
- Subscription television
