= Por amar sin ley season 2 =

Por amar sin ley
- Season 2
- Starring: Ana Brenda Contreras; David Zepeda; Julián Gil; José María Torre Hütt; Sergio Basañez; Altair Jarabo; Guillermo García Cantú; Kimberly Dos Ramos; Moisés Arizmendi; Geraldine Bazán; Víctor García; Marco Méndez; Axel Ricco; Alejandra García; Mar Zamora; Julio Vallado; Mauricio Rousselon; Marc Clotet; Azela Robinson; Roberto Ballesteros; Leticia Perdigón; Alejandro Tommasi; Arlette Pacheco; Karina Ancira; Nataly Umaña; Elías Campo; Diego Val; Lourdes Munguía; Polly; Daniela Álvarez; Lucía Silva
- No. of episodes: 91

Release
- Original network: Las Estrellas
- Original release: 3 March – 5 July 2019

Season chronology
- ← Previous; Season 1

The second season of the Mexican legal drama telenovela Por amar sin ley premiered on 3 March 2019 and ended on 5 July 2019, with production for the season having commenced in June 2018. The series is the second production of Las Estrellas to have a second season, after Mi marido tiene familia.

== Plot ==
Vega y Asociados is suffering an attack that puts the lives of all its lawyers at risk. After the death of Isabel and the kidnapping of Jaime, a new attack against Alonso makes everyone alert and worried about taking care of each other. Despite the aggressions they have suffered, the lawyers do not stop and continue the search against Jacinto Dorantes, who continues to be a fugitive. Alejandra is vulnerable because of her father's kidnapping, not knowing that Carlos, in order to help her free Jaime, is committing himself more to El Ciego. Gustavo is immersed in a deep depression that does not allow him to glimpse the thin line that exists between justice and revenge. Alonso does everything possible to do the justice that has sought so much, taking Jacinto Dorantes prisoner.

Despite all the problems they have to deal with, the team of lawyers continues to help their clients, victims of shocking cases. The office is strengthened with the arrival of new lawyers: Sofía Alcocer, specialist in criminal law; Javier Rivas, criminal lawyer specializing in criminology; Adrián Carvallo, specialist in international law; Lorena Fuentes, a recent graduate; and Manuel Durán, a young lawyer who is just doing his professional practices. The rivalry with Carlos' office is increasing. He hires Nancy Muñoz, an attractive criminal lawyer who does not touch her heart in order to achieve what she needs, to show Carlos everything she is capable of.

== Cast ==
- Ana Brenda Contreras as Alejandra Ponce
- David Zepeda as Ricardo Bustamante
- Julián Gil as Carlos Ibarra
- José María Torre Hütt as Roberto Morelli
- Sergio Basañez as Gustavo Soto
- Altair Jarabo as Victoria Escalante
- Guillermo García Cantú as Alonso Vega
- Kimberly Dos Ramos as Sofía Alcócer
- Moisés Arizmendi as Alan Páez
- Geraldine Bazán as Elena Fernández
- Víctor García as Juan López
- Marco Méndez as Javier Rivas
- Axel Ricco as El Ciego
- Alejandra García as Lorena Fuentes
- Mar Zamora as Nancy Muñoz
- Julio Vallado as Manuel Durán
- Mauricio Rousselon as Raúl
- Marc Clotet as Adrián Carballo
- Azela Robinson as Paula Ortega
- Roberto Ballesteros as Jaime Ponce
- Leticia Perdigón as Susana López
- Alejandro Tommasi as Nicolás
- Arlette Pacheco as Carmen
- Karina Ancira as Sonia
- Nataly Umaña as Tatiana
- Elías Campo as El Chivo
- Diego Val as El Cuervo
- Lourdes Munguía as Lourdes
- Polly as Alicia
- Daniela Álvarez as Fer
- Lucía Silva as Michelle

=== Special guest stars ===
- Juan Carlos Barreto as Jacinto Dorantes
- Ivonne Montero as Miriam
- Mauricio Abularach as Samuel
- Nora Salinas as Raquel
- Federico Ayos as Julio
- Thomas Victor Procida as Phillip
- Rafael del Villar as Sergio Cervantes
- Jeffrey Milton Pearson as Jacob Robbins
- Regina Castillo as Annie
- Manuel Lugo as Joe
- José Montini as Ramiro Dorantes
- Dayren Chávez as Eva
- Marcia Coutiño as Luisa
- Eugenio Cobo as Téllez
- Arsenio Campos as Gilberto
- Alfredo Herrera as Rafael
- Silvia Lomelí as Verónica
- Marlene Favela as Mónica
- Daniel Rascón as El Gato
- Laura Ferretti as Ariadna
- Diego de Erice as David
- Agustín Arana as Damián
- Erika Buenfil as Camila
- Claudia Lizaldi as Valeria
- Bea Ranero as Tania
- Raquel Olmedo as Astrid
- Lucero Lander as Irma
- Francisco Calmillo as Gerente Rebolledo
- Omar Germenos as Andrés Camacho
- Albi De Abreu as El Gringo
- Yahir Romo as Claudio
- Mimi Morales as Violeta
- Stephanie Slayton as Megan
- Tania Nicole as Sol
- Tamara Henaine as Sra. Ortega
- Tania Lizaldi as Srita. Ávila
- José Luis Cordero as Sr. Martínez
- Ricardo Crespo as Sergio
- Frank Medellín as Eduardo
- Luis Uribe as Dr. Ramos
- Solkin Ruz as Beto Ramos
- Blaine Burdette as Blums
- Chiquinquirá Delgado as Cristina
- Danielle Muehelen as Sharon
- Yamil Yaber as Federico Bustamante
- Karime Yaber as Natalia Bustamante
- Lilia Aragón as Gabriela
- Luis Couturier as Uriel
- Dalilah Polanco as Fanny
- Claudia Sophia García as Karla
- Gloria Sierra as Janet
- Norma Herrera as Lucrecia
- Roberto D’Amico as Felipe
- Anthony Álvarez as Trevor
- Eugenia Cauduro as Josefina
- Manuel Balbi as Leonardo
- Ilithya Manzanilla as Olivia
- Rodrigo Virago as Camilo
- Ferdinando Valencia as Víctor
- Erick Díaz as Ramón
- Chris Pacal as Erick
- Elvira Monsell as Eugenia
- Arturo Carmona as Daniel
- Marisol del Olmo as Rocio
- Jorge Poza as Fabián
- Mar Contreras as Lorenza

== Production ==
=== Development ===
On May 10, 2018, during the Univision Upfront for the 2018–2019 television season, it was confirmed that the series had been renewed for a second season. Whose production began on June 11, 2018, in Baja California Sur, one month after having finished with the production of the first season.

=== Casting ===
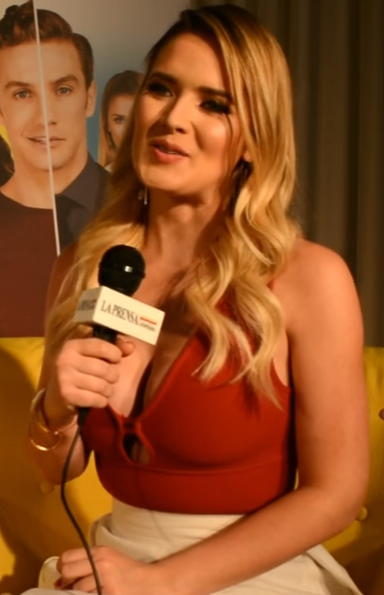
Kimberly Dos Ramos played Sofía Alcocer

After the confirmation of a second season. On 23 May 2018, it was confirmed that Geraldine Bazán and Issabela Camil would not be in the second part of the series. After the departure of some actors from the main cast, on 2 August 2018, the inclusion of Spanish actor Marc Clotet was confirmed. On 4 September 2018, it was confirmed that Kimberly Dos Ramos, who participated in the previous season as a guest, would be part of the main cast during the second season, and also confirmed the inclusion of Erika Buenfil who shares credits with Dos Ramos.

On 17 October 2018, it was confirmed that the Venezuelan actress Chiquinquirá Delgado would resume her acting career during the second season playing Cristina, her participation "is about a woman who has to make a firm decision about an experience of sexual harassment". Much of her participation will be in English and she shares credits mostly with Kimberly Dos Ramos, Ilithya Manzanilla, Marc Clotet and Manuel Balbi. The filming of the participation was filmed in Boston and New York and part of forum 15 of Televisa San Ángel and Mexico City. 8 November 2018 it was confirmed that Arturo Carmona and Marisol del Olmo would participate in a case "where a couple fights for the custody of their children, with a tragic outcome in which the mother kills the children and tries to commit suicide". The filming of this story was made in Mexico City and in the Televisa San Ángel forum.

== Episodes ==
No. overall	No. in season	Title	Original release date	Viewers (millions)
93	1	"Jacinto Dorantes manda matar a Alonso Vega"	3 March 2019 (Note: Premiered early online through Las Estrellas website and YouTube channel on 28 February 2019.)	3.1
In order to continue his revenge, Jacinto Dorantes pays El Ciego to kill Alonso Vega and he is seriously injured. El Ciego communicates with Alejandra to negotiate the rescue of Jaime, but she does not yield to his pretensions.
94	2	"Alejandra negocia la libertad de su padre con El Ciego"	4 March 2019	3.2
Alejandra offers El Ciego 15 million pesos for her father's life. Sofía Alcocer joins Vega & Asociados at a key moment for the law firm.
95	3	"Alejandra rescata a su padre"	5 March 2019	3.3
Thanks to Carlos, Alejandra gets the money to save her father and, determined, she will make the exchange and try to rescue him. Elena decides to leave the country for the safety of her children.
96	4	"Gustavo encuentra a Dorantes, ¿lo atrapará la justicia?"	6 March 2019	3.1
Gustavo finds Dorantes house and, although he wants to kill him with his own hands, he warns the police to stop him.
97	5	"Dorantes es detenido"	7 March 2019	3.2
Jacinto Dorantes is arrested at a checkpoint and his men look for Carlos to defend him.
98	6	"Carlos rechaza defender a Jacinto Dorantes"	8 March 2019	2.9
Dorantes demands that Carlos get him out of jail, but he refuses. Alejandra asks for the full weight of the law against Dorantes. Phillip hits Miriam and she defends herself from the attack, without thinking that the fight will have a fatal outcome. Juan and Roberto discover that someone planned Sergio Cervantes to get killed and that Ariadna was murdered.
99	7	"Dorantes es asesinado"	11 March 2019	3.1
As Jacinto Dorantes wants turn in El Ciego in exchange for his freedom, he orders for him to be killed. Jacob, Phillip's brother, takes Miriam’s children back to the United States, so Samuel will request Alejandra’s help.
100	8	"¿Quién mató a Sergio Cervantes?"	12 March 2019	3.2
Roberto and Juan discover that Sergio Cervantes was murdered and they are about to find the perpetrator. After the death of Jacinto, Ricardo tries to get Ramiro Dorantes to give him information on the attacks to Vega y Asociados. Alejandra decides to go get Miriam’s children.
101	9	"Roberto tiene celos de Adrián"	13 March 2019	2.9
Roberto finds Victoria and Adrián together talking and bursts with jealousy. Alejandra travels to the United States to help Miriam, and Jacob gets very aggressive and threatens her with a gun. Julio is arrested as a suspect in the murder of his parents, after the direct accusation of one of those responsible.
102	10	"Carlos y Ricardo pelean por Alejandra"	14 March 2019	3.4
Carlos assures Ricardo that he will fight to recover Alejandra, but Ricardo will not allow it. Javier Rivas joins the Vega office and his priority will be the case of Gustavo's family. Alejandra tries to prove that Miriam was beaten by Phillip.
103	11	"Alejandra rescata a los hijos de Miriam"	15 March 2019	3.3
Alejandra manages to arrest Jacob Robbins in order to recover Miriam's children and return them to Mexico. Sofía and Alejandra do a good team work and manage to prove that Miriam is innocent and she is free. Ricardo, Roberto and Adrián take the case of the murder of Dr. Lara, committed by Rafael.
104	12	"Alejandra gana el caso en Estados Unidos"	18 March 2019	2.8
A United States judge rules that Miriam's children return to Mexico with their mother. Ricardo congratulates Alejandra for her triumph.
105	13	"Nancy sospecha de los negocios turbios de Ibarra"	19 March 2019	2.9
Nancy sees El Chivo arrive at the firm and deliver a large amount of money to Carlos and Alan. El Ciego learns that the police are on the trail of Gato and decides to send El Chivo to kill him. Gustavo is desperate, because he believes that Javier's research is not going in the right direction. Roberto finds that a woman pretended to be Verónica so that Rafael would kill Dr. Lara.
106	14	"Victoria teme enamorarse de Roberto"	20 March 2019	3.1
Victoria confesses to Alejandra that she has much to lose from accepting a relationship with Roberto. Alejandra confesses to Victoria that she still loves Ricardo and that she plans to tell him everything and fight for his love. Between Roberto and Adrián they discover who is the woman suspected of the homicide of Dr. Lara. By a leak in the information, the killer of Gustavo's family appears dead.
107	15	"Julio es declarado culpable de parricidio"	21 March 2019	3.2
Julio confesses his guilt in the murder of his own parents, as well as the reasons that led him to commit that crime. The judge sentences him to 30 years in prison, Roberto and Juan will not appeal the case. Mónica Almazan is the name of the suspect in the case of Dr. Lara.
108	16	"Alejandro y Ricardo se besan, ¿regresarán?"	22 March 2019	3.1
Ricardo tells Alejandra that he will do everything to reconquer her and they kiss. With the help of Manuel, Juan gets more information about Mónica Almazán. Rafael narrates the situation that Veronica was going through with the doctor and everything seems to indicate that Mónica manipulated Rafael to kill the doctor.
109	17	"Victoria cacha a Roberto con otra mujer"	25 March 2019	2.8
Alejandra advises Victoria to give Roberto a chance, but Victoria discovers Roberto kissing Tania and suffers when she realizes that he will never change. Gustavo does not feel capable to take forward the case that Alonso has assigned him.
110	18	"Alejandra y Ricardo hacen el amor"	26 March 2019	3.0
Ricardo confesses to Alejandra that he wants to spend the rest of his days with her, both indulge in passion. Victoria infuriates Roberto and tells him that she is fed up with his lies.
111	19	"Mónica confiesa su crimen"	27 March 2019	3.1
Mónica is arrested for being the intellectual author of the death of Dr. Lara and, in the confrontation with Rafael, she says that she did everything for her son. Gustavo conducts David's trial for the custody of his daughter.
112	20	"Justicia por mano propia"	28 March 2019	2.9
Mónica exposes what happened to her son because of Dr. Lara, which motivated her to want his death, the lawyers of Vega y Asociados assure her that she has to pay for the crime she committed. Ricardo discovers that Alejandra is investigating who are the ones who kidnapped her father.
113	21	"Carlos le pide a Alejandra ser su socia"	29 March 2019	3.0
Carlos is going to expand his office, so he asks Alejandra to become one of his partners. The trial against Mónica and Rafael is carried out, and he accepts that his only mistake was to love "Verónica". The judge condemns them to spend many years in prison for the murder of Dr. Lara.
114	22	"Ricardo y Alejandra van a vivir juntos"	1 April 2019	2.8
Ricardo asks Alejandra to go live together to start a new stage in his life. Juan offers his help to Mónica so that he can be her defender. Alonso asks Alejandra that, for her safety, leave the case of him and her father.
115	23	"Alejandra se infiltra en terreno peligroso"	2 April 2019	3.0
Alejandra insists on finding the culprits of the abduction of her father, but in her investigation she will find a cellar full of blood. Nancy tells Carlos that, for her to belong to his office, he must tell her who he works for. Juan decides to take Mónica's case and appeal for her so that her sentence is reduced and she can be able to be with her son.
116	24	"Alejandra es la nueva socia de Vega y Asociados"	3 April 2019	2.9
Alonso wants Alejandra to be a partner of the firm and Ricardo, Victoria and Roberto, the other associates, agree with the appointment. Victoria's indifference causes Roberto to return to his life of excesses with alcohol and with women. Alejandra reveals to Jaime that she has discovered the place where they had him kidnapped. At the same time, she takes the case of Claudio, who seeks to recognize his son, but Gabriela denies him paternity.
117	25	"El Ciego incendia el bar del Gringo"	4 April 2019	2.8
El Ciego orders to burn El Gringo's bar to show him who the boss is, but this will unleash a war to the death. Andrés accuses wife his wife Violeta and her mother-in-law Aurora of having stolen his vehicle, when in fact this accusation is false.
118	26	"Mónica recipe una segunda oportunidad"	5 April 2019	2.7
Thanks to Juan, Mónica receives a reduced sentence of 24 to 15 years in prison and will now seek to be close to her son as soon as possible. The relatives of the victims of the fire in El Gringo's bar ask for justice and relief of their pain.
119	27	"El Ciego manda matar a Alejandra"	8 April 2019	2.9
El Ciego will not let anyone track him or discover him, so he orders his people to take Alejandra out of the way. Victoria promises Violeta that she will help her discover why her husband has sent her to prison and that she will get her out of there. The trial of Claudio for the paternity of his son is carried out.
120	28	"Carlos sufre al no poder amar a Alejandra"	9 April 2019	3.0
Carlos congratulates Alejandra after learning that she is the new partner of the firm, but it hurts her not to be with her and to tell her that he loves her. Victoria can not locate Andrés Camacho or Sol, husband and daughter of Violeta.
121	29	"Alejandra recibe un impacto de bala"	10 April 2019	2.9
During Alejandra's celebration, a confrontation between El Gringo's men and El Ciego's cartel is unleashed. Alejandra is injured and her life is in danger. Carlos and Ricardo fight when they see Alejandra wounded. Sofía and Javier discover that the fire in the club was caused by drug traffickers.
122	30	"Ricardo se culpa del accidente de Alejandra"	11 April 2019	2.8
While Alejandra is torn between life and death, the Vega group joins to not stop doing justice. Ricardo tells Paula that he should have protected Alejandra more and that without her he would feel lost. Victoria is the most affected by what has happened to Alejandra; so, Roberto and Adrián will offer their support.
123	31	"Vega y asociados unirán sus fuerzas"	12 April 2019	2.7
Alonso discovers the evidence that Alejandra had against those responsible for the kidnapping and, with the support of his entire team, they will fight so that the kidnappers receive their punishment. Carlos strengthens his relationship with El Ciego to put an end to El Gringo.
124	32	"Alejandra deja una voluntad anticipada"	15 April 2019	2.5
Jaime tells Paola that Alejandra has signed an advance directive, in case she does not wake up. Nancy warns Carlos that if he does not explain his relationship with organized crime, she will not help him anymore.
125	33	"Alejandra entra en crisis, ¿se salvará?"	16 April 2019	3.2
Alejandra wakes up and the first thing she says to Ricardo is that she loves him. Ricardo formally asks her to marry him, without hesitation Alejandra agrees to be his wife. After receiving the visit of Carlos, Alejandra suffers a convulsion.
126	34	"Alejandra tiene muerte cerebral"	17 April 2019	2.8
Alejandra goes into cardiac arrest and despite medical intervention, she is declared brain dead. And although they ask to respect the anticipated will that she signed, Ricardo hopes that Alejandra will react and refuses to disconnect her from the artificial respirator. Alonso gives confidence to Lorena and Manuel, to take their first case alone.
127	35	"Desconectan a Alejandra"	18 April 2019	N/A
With deep pain, Jaime, Paula, and Ricardo respect the will of Alejandra and ask for her to be disconnected from the artificial respirator. Victoria and Adrián arrive in Austin to look for Andrés and Sol Camacho. Jaime tries to console Ricardo and reminds him of all the virtues his daughter has and how she would like to be remembered.
128	36	"Vega y Asociados buscará justicia para Alejandra"	19 April 2019	N/A
At Alejandra's funeral, her family and friends give her the last goodbye. Victoria finds out that her friend and companion, Alejandra was disconnected so as not to prolong her suffering. However, she is the only one who can not attend her funeral. Ricardo is devastated and with Alonso he promises to find those responsible for the death of Alejandra. Finally, Victoria locates Andrés Camacho and exerts his extradition so that he responds for leaving his wife in jail.
129	37	"Ricardo golpea al agente Quiroz"	22 April 2019	2.6
Ricardo believes he has failed Alejandra, for not taking care of her, and points to agent Quiroz as guilty of her death. The lies of Andrés Camacho are exposed and he will have to answer before the Mexican justice.
130	38	"Victoria gana el caso de Violeta y Aurora"	23 April 2019	2.7
Violeta and Aurora are finally released thanks to the support of Victoria and Adrián, Andrés receives his punishment for deceiving justice. Ricardo and Carlos are submerged in a deep depression over the death of Alejandra.
131	39	"Carlos amenaza a Alan"	24 April 2019	2.9
Carlos complains to Alan for wanting to re-inaugurate his office without his authorization and assures him that if he continues acting behind his back, he will take him out of the office. Ricardo tries to recover for the loss of Alejandra, but blames everyone for her death, which also includes Sofía. Nancy tries to seduce Carlos again.
132	40	"Carlos le pide a Nancy manipular las pruebas"	25 April 2019	2.7
Given that agent Quiroz is about to discover his links with organized crime, Carlos asks Nancy, with her seductive ability, to edit the videos of the restaurant where Alejandra died to avoid being linked to the case. Ricardo refuses to understand that Alejandra did not suffer an attack.
133	41	"Cristina sufre acoso sexual"	26 April 2019	2.6
The American dream has a very high price. Cristina Valero is sexually harassed by Mr. Blums in New York.
134	42	"Carlos quiere matar al Gringo"	29 April 2019	3.0
Carlos demands El Ciego to find El Gringo because he wants to kill him with his own hands. With great skill, Nancy manages to alter the videos of the restaurant. Ricardo suspects that Carlos has something to do with the attack that cost Alejandra her life. Paula receives a notice of seizure from her home, because Gilberto has not made several payments and Paula confronts Alicia for the irresponsibility of her husband.
135	43	"Cristina es despedida"	30 April 2019	2.7
Cristina makes a complaint in Human Resources against Mr. Blums for sexual harassment, but he fires her and she has to return to Mexico. Juan tries to reach an agreement with Alan about the project stolen from Fernanda.
136	44	"Carlos y Nancy se dejan llevar por la pasión"	1 May 2019	2.6
Nancy makes another attempt to seduce Carlos, only this time she succeeds and he will correspond. A new case of sexual harassment comes to the firm from a very important businessman in New York, Sofía and Adrián take the case.
137	45	"El Ciego quiere provocar al Gringo"	2 May 2019	2.6
El Ciego asks his men to go and sell his merchandise in El Gringo's territories so that he can go and look for him. Janet lives with her wife Fanny and her daughter Karla, but Janet's parents do not agree with their relationship and things get worse when she ends up in the hospital due to a cerebral vascular problem. Michelle and El Gringo agree to attack El Ciego's organization from within.
138	46	"Fer termina con Juan"	3 May 2019	2.7
Fer decides to end her relationship with Juan because he has changed and they no longer have many things in common, Tatiana takes advantage the news to flirt with Juan. Paula's house is seized, so she will sue Gilberto to try to recover her patrimony.
139	47	"La guerra aún no termina"	6 May 2019	2.6
El Gringo kidnaps El Chivo to convince him to become his infiltrator and thus win the battle against El Ciego. Lucrecia does not allow Fanny to be at the wake of her daughter Jannet and will do everything to separate Karla from Fanny, but she will fight for the custody of her daughter.
140	48	"Carlos y El Ciego atacarán al Gringo"	7 May 2019	2.7
Carlos asks El Ciego for information about El Gringo to destroy him, but El Ciego asks him if he is ready to see his enemy die. The prosecutor needs hard evidence to support Cristina's accusations against Blums.
141	49	"Leonardo y Olivia se unen a Vega y asociados"	8 May 2019	2.4
Sofía and Adrián by orders of Alonso receive the support of Leonardo and Olivia to help them solve the case of Cristina against Blums. El Ciego discovers Carlos with Nancy. Josefina asks Alonso for help so that her sons, Víctor and Camilo, no longer fight over possession of the tequila company.
142	50	"Cristina hace viral su acoso sexual"	9 May 2019	N/A
After the advice of her lawyers, Cristina denounces the sexual harassment she suffered through a video on her social media and it goes viral. Josefina is confident that Alonso can reach an agreement with her sons Víctor and Camilo, so that none of them destroy the family patrimony. Ricardo carries out Fanny's defense for Karla's custody.
143	51	"Carlos cae en la trampa de Michelle Salgado"	10 May 2019	2.0
Michelle Salgado, the accomplice of El Gringo, fools Carlos and hires him as a lawyer in order to be closer to El Ciego and attack him. Cristina gives an interview so that more women report cases of harassment by Blums. Sentence is given in Fanny's case so she can visit her daughter Karla.
144	52	"El juicio de Cristina"	13 May 2019	2.6
With the help of Adrián, Sofía, Leonardo and Olivia, Cristina's case is resolved and Blums will receive his punishment in prison. Ricardo doubts Carlos, so he will investigate everything about him to prove that he is involved with Alejandra's death.
145	53	"Roberto sospecha de Adrián"	14 May 2019	2.6
Roberto is jealous of Victoria and Adrián's friendship and believes that he hides something under his perfect boy personality. Because of the punishment he has been given, El Chivo lets El Gringo know about the new movement of El Ciego. The trial of Josefina against her son Víctor is carried out.
146	54	"Alan descubre el romance de Nancy y Carlos"	15 May 2019	2.4
After surprising them by kissing in the office, Alan tells Nancy to be careful with Carlos. In the city of Los Angeles, Ramón leaves his keys inside his car and when he breaks the glass to obtain them, a patrol surprises him and confuses him with an assailant and kills him. Camila, Sofía's mother, is arrested for wandering naked in the street.
147	55	"Crimen por racismo"	16 May 2019	2.5
Eugenia asks Vega y Asociados for help so that the death of her son, Ramón, does not go unpunished. Paula does not accept to remain without anything because of the bad payments of Gilberto and the wins the case, reason why Gilberto will have to spend many years in prison.
148	56	"Enfermedad sin cura"	17 May 2019	2.9
The doctor confirms that Camila has Alzheimer's and Sofía is willing to leave Vega y Asociados to take care of her mother. Victoria, Roberto, Adrián and Carmen, travel to the United States to clarify Ramón's death.
149	57	"Sofía renuncia a Vega y asociados"	20 May 2019	2.4
Sofía notifies Alonso that she will leave Vega y Asociados to be able to take care of her mother. After Daniel requested the support of Carlos and Alan to ask for custody of his children, the minors appear dead in a mysterious way. Alonso speaks with Sofía and asks her not to leave Vega y Asociados, since they are a team and everyone can find a solution to take care of her mother.
150	58	"Justicia para los hermanos latinos"	21 May 2019	2.3
Victoria, Adrián and Roberto will do whatever it takes to make those responsible for Ramón's death pay. Daniel finds out what has been the cause of death of his children.
151	59	"¿Culpable o inocente?"	22 May 2019	2.5
The trial against Olson, the policeman who murdered Ramón, is carried out. Sofía and Ricardo will take charge of the case of Fabián Torres, who is notified of an alleged paternity that he does not recognize.
152	60	"Asesina a sus propios hijos"	23 May 2019	2.5
Daniel will seek to do justice against Rocío for having taken the lives of his children. Adrián tells Victoria what he feels for her and asks her not to leave him and allow him to be close to her.
153	61	"Roberto teme perder a Victoria para siempre"	24 May 2019	2.7
Roberto confesses to his father that he is in love with Victoria and that because of her relationship with Adrián, he can never be with her again. While Ricardo and Sofía take advantage of their trip to Los Cabos to get to know each other better, Michelle expresses her interest in Carlos. El Ciego's people find the whereabouts of El Gringo and begin to plan how he can destroy him.
154	62	"Paternidad bajo engaño"	27 May 2019	2.4
Fabián is the father of the son that Ana claims, but he claims not to have consummated sex with her. Bernardo decides to help Paula to overcome the loss of Alejandra.
155	63	"El mensaje del Ciego"	28 May 2019	2.6
El Ciego murders one of El Gringo's men and sends him the corpse as a message of war, Nancy discovers that Vega and Asociados are after both cartels. Ricardo and Sofía investigate how Ana has been able to get pregnant with Fabián.
156	64	"Roberto recibe la visita de una misteriosa mujer"	29 May 2019	2.6
Roberto receives in his office the visit of a woman who, by revealing her identity, will leave him speechless. Vega and Asociados lawyers attend the inauguration party of Juan's new home. Nancy tells Carlos that Javier is investigating the attack against Alejandra, and that his relationship with El Ciego could soon be discovered. Tatiana does everything to win Juan's heart and ends up stealing a kiss.
157	65	"Roberto se reencuentra con su madre"	30 May 2019	2.7
Lucía, Roberto's mother, reunites with him after twenty-five years of absence. Lucía assures Roberto that, even though his father never allowed them to be together, she was always looking out for him. Lorenza is determined to divorce Daniel.
158	66	"Alan asesina al licenciado Téllez"	31 May 2019	2.5
As the lawyer Téllez threatens Alan with telling Carlos the whole truth, he runs over him without mercy. Roberto confronts his father to learn the truth about his mother's abandonment.
159	67	"Carlos sospecha que Alan mató a Téllez"	3 June 2019	2.5
Carlos discovers that Téllez was murdered and questions Alan about it. The hearing is held for the alleged fatherhood of Daniel. Juanito does not know how to forget about Fer. And although she does not want to know anything about him, he still hopes that one day she will forgive him.
160	68	"Carlos cae ante el encanto de Michelle"	4 June 2019	2.5
Michelle finally manages to seduce Carlos and he kisses her, Nancy is jealous and begins to investigate her. Sofía and Ricardo make a promise of union in front of the sea.
161	69	"La salud de la mamá de Sofía empeora"	5 June 2019	2.7
Camila enters into crisis when she begins to ask about her husband and Sofía confesses that he died years ago. Gustavo takes the case of Sara, to whom her husband has abandoned her, but not before threatening to take her son away.
162	70	"El arresto de Alan"	6 June 2019	2.4
Alan is arrested for being the main suspect in Téllez's death. Sofía discovers that her mother's disease is hereditary.
163	71	"Nancy intriga contra Alan"	7 June 2019	2.6
After Alan's arrest, Carlos confronts Sonia for her abuse of authority. Nancy asks Carlos if he is sure that Alan is innocent of murdering Tellez. El Gringo complains to Michelle for the methods she uses with Carlos to obtain information about El Ciego.
164	72	"Carlos corre a Alan de su vida para siempre"	10 June 2019	2.4
After the search of the Ibarra office, Carlos asks Alan not to return to the office anymore or to look for him again. Diego Molina will be deported by immigration, allegedly for illegally residing in the United States.
165	73	"¿Romance otoñal a la vista?"	11 June 2019	2.7
Nicolás visits Camila to help her with her illness and both agree to be great friends. Sara's hearing is held against her ex-husband Rodrigo for the custody of her son. Ricardo and Victoria take the case of Diego Molina, so that he can return with his family to the United States.
166	74	"El Gringo contraataca"	12 June 2019	2.5
El Gringo, with the help of El Chivo, arrive at the hiding place of El Ciego to kill him. After the proof he has found, Carlos asks Alan to confess his crime.
167	75	"El verdadero asesino de Patricia"	13 June 2019	2.7
Carlos discovers, thanks to Sonia Reyes, that Alan was the one who killed Patricia. Victoria feels nervous about facing her first case in the United States.
168	76	"Carlos manda silenciar a Alan"	14 June 2019	2.4
Carlos asks the El Ciego to beat Alan in jail so he does not reveal the links between the two. Ricardo and Victoria try to take the case of Diego Molina to trial, so he can return to the United States.
169	77	"La libertad es el principio de todo"	17 June 2019	2.7
While Victoria and Ricardo try to win Diego Molina's deportation case, Alan negotiates with Sonia to get him out of prison. Nancy is responsible for disappearing the evidence linking Carlos with El Ciego.
170	78	"Carlos y Michelle hacen el amor"	18 June 2019	2.7
Carlos invites Michelle to his house and there both get carried away by passion. El Ciego sends a message to Alan in prison. Javier discovers that there are no fingerprints that link El Ciego with the attacks to the Vega office. Ricardo swears to Victoria that Roberto has never cheated on her.
171	79	"Adrián está casado"	19 June 2019	2.6
Adrián is about to tell Victoria the secret he hides, but before he does Debbie, his wife, appears in Vega and asociados.
172	80	"No todos los hombres son como tú"	20 June 2019	2.8
Victoria assures Roberto that if she believes in Adrián's words it is because he was honest and she is sure that he would not betray her as he did. Alonso, Javier and Roberto take the case of Mayte, whose brothers want to take away her share of the rights of the family business.
173	81	"Michelle y El Gringo pelean por Carlos"	21 June 2019	2.6
El Gringo is determined to kill Carlos after seeing that Michelle's plan does not work, but she puts a stop to it. Nancy discovers that Michelle's company does not exist. Juan begins to lose it and gets carried away by Tatiana's bad advice. He thinks he is doing things right, but his mother is responsible for putting him to thinking.
174	82	"El regreso de Benjamín"	24 June 2019	2.7
Ricardo looks for Benjamín in jail to ask for help with the investigation into the cartels that are attacking Vega and asociados. Nancy confronts Michelle so she can explain what her true intentions are with Carlos.
175	83	"Me vas a conocer como no te gustaría"	25 June 2019	2.9
Roberto threatens Adrián if he hurts Victoria. In San Diego, California, police find immigrants transported in the trunk of Jorge's car. Nancy warns Carlos that Michelle is lying to him and that she hides something from him.
176	84	"Nunca te voy a lastimar"	26 June 2019	2.6
Adrián asks Victoria to give themselves a chance. El Ciego visits Carlos to alarm him about the problem that is looming with El Gringo. Everyone is in danger, including Vega y asociados. Adrián, with the help of Juan and Manuel, will take Jorge's case, in San Diego, California.
177	85	"Elena le pide ayuda a Ricardo para controlar a su hijo"	27 June 2019	2.9
Elena believes that Federico is consuming drugs and Ricardo promises to travel to Vancouver to speak with him. Lucía resorts to her son Roberto, she is going to be evicted from her home.
178	86	"Nicolás le exige a Lucía alejarse de Roberto"	28 June 2019	2.6
Nicolás will not allow Lucía to hurt his son and, unlike the past, asks him to stay away from him. Benjamín tries to convince Ramiro to reveal who is behind the attacks on the Vega law firm.
179	87	"Michelle asesina al Gringo"	1 July 2019	2.6
Michelle will not allow El Gringo to threaten her and ruin her plans, so she decides to kill him. The trial of Jorge Aguirre, accused of human trafficking, is carried out.
180	88	"Siempre me voy a preocupar por ti"	2 July 2019	2.5
Roberto discovers that his mother could be deceiving him, so Victoria offers him consolation after seeing him broken by the news. Lorena finally confesses to Gustavo what she feels for him. Ramiro reveals to Benjamín who is behind the attacks on Vega y asociados. Susana confronts Tatiana and demands that she stay away from Juan, but things do not go as expected. By telling Fer what happened, she also decides to face her. Gustavo manages to be face to face with one of the culprits of the death of his family.
181	89	"Antentado en Vega y asociados"	3 July 2019	2.9
Ricardo finds out that El Ciego is responsible for the attacks on the Vega law firm, and confronts Carlos for having freed the culprit of Alejandra's death. El Ciego and his men go to of Vega y asociados to kill Alonso and when he does not find him he decides to torture the employees so that they give him information about the whereabouts of all the lawyers.
182	90	"Siento algo muy fuerte por ti"	4 July 2019	2.9
Ricardo and Sofía get carried away by the pain after the attack and kiss passionately, which culminates in a confession of love. Manuel suffers the worst consequences of El Ciego’s attack to the offices of the Vega law firm.
183	91	"Justicia"	5 July 2019	2.7
El Ciego faces the police, but is arrested by Quiroz. After helping her with El Ciego’s whereabouts, Sofía defends Benjamín and manages to get him out of jail. El Ciego, in addition to telling Carlos how he started in the business, assures him that his arrest is the beginning of the war. Roberto assures Victoria that he would give his life for her and that the idea of losing her hurts; Victoria asks for time. Alan gets a visit from Sonia, who offers him witness protection in exchange for information about Carlos; Alan agrees to cooperate. While Javier discovers the deceit of Nancy, Benjamín joins the Ibarra firm to finish Vega and Asociados. Vega and Asociados will seek to make El Ciego pay for all the damage he did.
