= Por amar sin ley season 1 =

Por amar sin ley
- Season 1
- Promotional poster
- Starring: Ana Brenda Contreras; David Zepeda; Julián Gil; José María Torre Hütt; Sergio Basañez; Altair Jarabo; Guillermo García Cantú; Pablo Valentín; Ilithya Manzanilla; Geraldine Bazán; Moisés Arizmendi; Manuel Balbi; Víctor García; Eva Cedeño; Azela Robinson; Roberto Ballesteros; Leticia Perdigón; Issabela Camil; Arlette Pacheco; Magda Karina; Lourdes Munguía; Polly; Daniela Álvarez
- No. of episodes: 92

Release
- Original network: Las Estrellas
- Original release: 12 February – 17 June 2018

Season chronology
- Next → Season 2

The first season of the drama television series created by José Alberto Castro Por amar sin ley premiered on Las Estrellas on 12 February 2018, at 9.30 pm and ended on 17 June 2018 in Mexico. It revolves around the personal life and work of a group of lawyers belonging to a prestigious law firm.

The season features a large ensemble cast, including Ana Brenda Contreras, David Zepeda, and Julián Gil in the lead roles, along with José María Torre Hütt, Sergio Basañez, Altair Jarabo, Guillermo García Cantú, Pablo Valentín, Ilithya Manzanilla, Geraldine Bazán, Moisés Arizmendi, Manuel Balbi, Víctor García, Eva Cedeño, Azela Robinson, Roberto Ballesteros, Leticia Perdigón, Issabela Camil, Arlette Pacheco, Magda Karina, Lourdes Munguía, Polly, and Daniela Álvarez as part of the main cast.

In the United States the season premiered on Univision on 5 March 2018 at 10pm/9c and ended on 6 July 2018.

On 10 May 2018, Univision revealed through its upfront for the 2018-19 television season that the series renewed for a second season.

== Plot ==
The season follows the life of a group of lawyers who work for the firm Vega y Asociado founded by Alonso Vega (Guillermo García Cantú). The main characters are Alejandra (Ana Brenda Contreras), Ricardo (David Zepeda) and Carlos (Julián Gil). After the police imprison Carlos for the death of a prostitute, Alejandra begins to work for Vega y Asociado and begins to be attracted to Ricardo, but Carlos, after seeing this, decides to do everything possible to separate them together with the help of Elena (Geraldine Bazán). On the other hand, are Victoria (Altair Jarabo) and Roberto (José María Torre Hütt), Roberto tries to seduce her, but she refuses to fall into his game, Benjamín (Pablo Valentín) and Leticia (Eva Cedeño), two ambitious lawyers who are lovers, Olivia (Ilithya Manzanilla) who is madly in love with Leonardo (Manuel Balbi), but he only has eyes for his work, Gustavo (Sergio Basañez), who after a bad decision ends his marriage, and Juan López (Víctor García), a lawyer who admires the firm Vega y Asociado and wishes to obtain a position in that law firm.

== Cast ==
Main characters of the telenovela. From left to right includes Moisés Arizmendi, Pablo Valentín, Eva Cedeño, José María Torre Hütt, Altair Jarabo, Guillermo García Cantú, Víctor García, David Zepeda, Ana Brenda Contreras, Julián Gil, Sergio Basañez, Ilithya Manzanilla, and Manuel Balbi.

=== Main ===
- Ana Brenda Contreras as Alejandra Ponce, she is a lawyer in family cases.
- David Zepeda as Ricardo Bustamante, he is a senior lawyer in family cases, Elena's ex-husband.
- Julián Gil as Carlos Ibarra, he is a prestigious lawyer.
- José María Torre Hütt as Roberto Morelli, he is an attorney lawyer of Vega y Asociado.
- Sergio Basañez as Gustavo Soto, is a lawyer for Vega and Asociados.
- Altair Jarabo as Victoria Escalante, lawyer of Vega y Asociados, she has an interest in Roberto, but does not show it.
- Guillermo García Cantú as Alonso Vega, he is the owner of the law firm Vega y Asociados.
- Pablo Valentín as Benjamín Acosta, ambitious lawyer of the company Vega Y Asociado.
- Ilithya Manzanilla as Olivia Suárez, she is a dedicated lawyer in cases of family abuse.
- Geraldine Bazán as Elena Fernández, ex-wife of Ricardo.
- Moisés Arizmendi as Alan Páez, Carlos cousin.
- Manuel Balbi as Leonardo Morán, lawyer of Vega y Asociado.
- Víctor García as Juan López, independent lawyer who then starts working for Vega y Asociados.
- Eva Cedeño as Leticia Jara, junior lawyer of Vega y Asociado, Benjamin's lover.
- Azela Robinson as Paula Ortega, Alejandra's mother.
- Roberto Ballesteros as Jaime Ponce, Alejandra's father.
- Leticia Perdigón as Susana López, Juan's mother.
- Issabela Camil as Isabel, Gustavo's wife.
- Arlette Pacheco as Carmen, secretary of Vega y Asociados.
- Magda Karina as Sonia, prosecutor of the public ministry.
- Nataly Umaña as Tatiana, she is Patricia Linares friend.
- Lourdes Munguía as Lourdes, she is the best friend of Paula.
- Polly as Alicia, she is the best friend of Paula.
- Daniela Álvarez as Fer, neighbor of Juan and Susana, help Juan to do research.

=== Recurring ===
- Yamil Yaber as Federico Bustamante, Elena's son.
- Karime Yaber as Natalia Bustamante, Elena's daughter.

=== Special guest stars ===
- María José as Patricia Linares, she is a prostitute who attends Carlos' bachelor party.
- David Ostrosky as Saúl Morales, he is a prestigious businessman who comes to Carlos to help him with defamation.
- Ricardo Fastlicht as Méndez, he is a businessman who goes crazy because of Benjamin.
- María José Magán as Ana María, she was Leonardo's girlfriend, until she decides to be unfaithful to her best friend.
- Gilberto Romo as Daniela Segura, is a transgender who struggles to have the paternity of his son.
- Jade Fraser as Rocío, she is Victoria's friend, she suffers abuse from her husband.
- Alejandro Ibarra as Darío, he is the husband of Rocío, he ends up imprisoned for murdering his wife.
- Ana Patricia Rojo as Lina, she is the daughter of Virginia.
- Jacqueline Andere as Virginia, she is an elderly lady, who is accused by her son of suffering from a disease that prevents her from deciding what to do with all her fortune.
- Lisette Morelos as Mariana, she is an old ex-girlfriend of Ricardo.
- Joshua Gutiérrez as Fermín, he is the employee of Virginia.
- Fabián Robles as Pérez, is a man who seeks help in Alejandra to be able to have custody of his children.
- Zaide Silvia Gutiérrez as Silvia, she is the employee of Jimena.
- Dobrina Cristeva as Jimena, she owns a mansion that accuses Silvia of having stolen an expensive jewel.
- Natalia Juárez as Anita, she is Jimena's daughter.
- Aleida Núñez as Milena, she is Gustavo's lover.
- Raúl Magaña as Raúl, Mariana husband's.
- Andrea Ortega-Lee as Rosita, cleaning employee of Vega y Asociados.
- Sofía Castro as Nora, a young woman who is accused of culpable murder.
- Nuria Bages as Cinthya, Nora's mother.
- Jesús Ochoa as Taxista, a taxi driver who tries to abuse Nora and dies after a strong confrontation with Nora.
- Marco Muñoz as Ojeda, a client who goes with Ricardo to divorce his wife.
- Pilar Ixquic Mata as Laura, Ojeda's wife.
- Alex Sirvent as Arturo, boy who knows Olivia through a dating app.
- José Elías Moreno as Joel, friend of Ricardo who loses his house because of his children.
- Ernesto D'Alessio as Agustín, is the ex-husband of Lorenza, who demands a pension for his son who suffers from certain problems.
- Margarita Magaña as Lorenza, Agustín's ex-wife.
- Gabriela Zamora as Lupita
- Gloria Aura as Inés
- Daniela Noguez as Claudia
- José Carlos Ruiz as Armando
- Aitor Iturrioz as Óscar
- Rodrigo Cuevas as Patricio
- Pepe Olivares as Lara
- Carlos Gatica as Rodrigo
- Andrea Torre as Nuria
- Toño Mauri as Dr. Ávalos
- Luis Xavier as Papá Gutiérrez
- Claudia Acosta as Florentina
- Juan Carlos Nava as Tomás
- Renata Notni as Sol
- Adal Ramones as Alberto
- Laura Carmine as Berenice
- Danna García as Fanny
- José Ron as Ramón
- Pedro Prieto as Alfonso
- Macaria as Marcia
- Silvia Manríquez as Melisa
- Carmen Becerra as Ligia
- Luis Romano as Fabián
- Daniela Luján as Valeria
- Alejandra Zaid as Alexa
- Ernesto Gómez Cruz as Plutarco
- Kimberly Dos Ramos as Sofía

== Production ==
The start of production began on 6 November 2017, and concluded in May 2018.

== Reception ==
The series premiered on 12 February 2018 with a total of 3.1 million viewers, surpassing its closest competition, El César. Despite this excellent start, the most watched television show that day in Mexico was La rosa de Guadalupe, which was watched by a total of 3.4 million viewers.

In the United States it premiered on Univision on 5 March 2018 with a total of 1.58 million viewers, surpassing to Enemigo íntimo its closest competition, which was only seen by 1.54 million viewers. During its first month of broadcasting, the telenovela was positioned as the most watched Spanish-language television program at 10pm/9c, surpassing Telemundo. After being more than a month being Univision's most watched show at 10pm, and surpassing Telemundo's telenovela, on 8 May 2018 during the premiere of the sixth season of El Señor de los Cielos, the telenoela only recorded one a total of 1.44 million viewers, while the premiere of El Señor de los Cielos reached a total of 2.14 million viewers, leaving Univision production as the least watched program at 10pm.

== Episodes ==
No. overall	No. in season	Title	Original release date	Mexico viewers (millions)
1	1	"La boda de Alejandra y Carlos es interrumpida por la policía"	12 February 2018	3.1
One day before getting married, Carlos decides to spend the night with a sensual dancer. During his wedding with Alejandra, the police intervene and accuse him for the murder of Patricia Linares.
2	2	"Alejandra sufre la infidelidad de Carlos"	13 February 2018	2.7
Carlos is transferred to a prison for the murder of Patricia. Alejandra can not believe that her fiancé has been unfaithful a day before her wedding and hesitates to forgive him.
3	3	"Leonardo es herido de gravedad"	14 February 2018	2.5
A client of Benjamin loses control and accidentally shoots Leonardo. Concerned about him, Olivia decides to visit him in the hospital and learns that he has a lover.
4	4	"Carlos se niega a perder el amor de Alejandra"	15 February 2018	2.7
Desperate, Carlos asks Alan to involve Alejandra in his case and ask for legal advice, so she will not forget him and help him get out of jail.
5	5	"Roberto se acuesta con la novia de Leonardo"	17 February 2018	2.7
While Leonardo recovers in the hospital, his girlfriend is seduced by Roberto's charm. Finally Ana María falls into Morelli's networks and ends up committing an infidelity.
6	6	"Ricardo le hace una propuesta a Alejandra"	19 February 2018	2.6
Ricardo asks Alejandra to be part of the law firm of Vega y Asociados, unfortunately Alan misunderstands this situation and believes that she is cheating on his cousin Carlos.
7	7	"Roberto se siente culpable de engañar a Leonardo"	20 February 2018	3.0
Roberto tries to confess to Leonardo that he betrayed him by sleeping with his fiancée, but Ana María is in charge of preventing the truth from being known in order to continue with her commitment.
8	8	"Victoria se entera que Rocío está muerta"	21 February 2018	2.8
Darío loses control and hits Rocío hard to kill her, Victoria learns of this terrible event and decides to denounce the aggressor to make him pay for the crime he committed.
9	9	"Alejandra le roba el puesto a Leticia"	22 February 2018	3.2
Alonso is responsible for informing Leticia that the position of senior lawyer is already occupied. Ricardo congratulates Alejandra and welcomes her to Vega y Asociados.
10	10	"Gustavo tiene una amante"	23 February 2018	2.8
Gustavo receives the reproach of his wife Isabel for giving priority to his work and not to his family. He tries to justify his absence so that his infidelity is not discovered.
11	11	"Ricardo evita que Paula vaya a la cárcel"	26 February 2018	3.0
Alejandra's mother gets into serious trouble and is taken to the delegation. Ricardo immediately offers to help her and defends her to avoid being imprisoned along with her friends.
12	12	"Leonardo y Roberto vuelven a ser amigos"	27 February 2018	2.9
Roberto fills Leonardo's office with lots of roses and chocolates. Seeing that ridiculous detail, Leonardo decides to forgive him and in turn he asks Olivia to forgive him for treating her so badly.
13	13	"Elena le prohíbe a Ricardo que siga viendo a sus hijos"	28 February 2018	2.7
Elena takes advantage of the discussion she had with Federico to complain to Ricardo about all the damage he caused to his family. She makes the firm decision to forbid him to see her children again.
14	14	"Leticia manipula a Elena"	1 March 2018	3.0
Leticia tries to convince Elena to prevent Ricardo from running into Alejandra's arms. For her plan to work, she advises that she use his children, since they are his weak point.
15	15	"Milena destruye el matrimonio de Gustavo"	2 March 2018	2.9
Isabel sees the video that Milena sent and discovers the infidelity of her husband. Gustavo tries to apologize, but it is in vain because his marriage has already collapsed.
16	16	"Victoria logra hacer justicia"	5 March 2018	2.5
Victoria presents enough evidence to be able to accuse Darío of femicide and condemn him to forty years in prison. Despite doing justice, the death of Rocío leaves her very hurt.
17	17	"Juan se enfrenta a Roberto"	6 March 2018	2.7
With the help of Fernanda, Juan seeks the necessary evidence to save Silvia. Upon learning that he will face Roberto, he prepares his best defense to prove to the judge the innocence of his client.
18	18	"Ricardo y Alejandra se dan su primer beso"	7 March 2018	2.7
The love between Ricardo and Alejandra is detonated after a passionate kiss, both decide not to stop what they feel and give themselves the opportunity to be happy.
19	19	"Leonardo y Roberto sospechan de Alan"	8 March 2018	2.8
Determined to find information to solve Carlos' case, Leonardo and Roberto decide to go to the crime scene. When they are investigating, they think of Alan as a possible suspect.
20	20	"Juan se integra al bufete Vega y Asociados"	9 March 2018	2.9
Roberto personally approaches Juan to make an offer of work. He without hesitation accepts the position of lawyer Jr. and the own Alonso Vega welcomes him to the office.
21	21	"Alan se hace cargo del caso de Nora"	12 March 2018	2.9
Cinthya hires Alan's services to take his daughter's case. Things get complicated in the first trial and Nora's freedom comes into play.
22	22	"Carlos se harta de la incompetencia de Alan"	13 March 2018	2.7
Carlos explodes when he learns that Alan lost Nora's case. Seeing that his office is losing credibility threatens him and asks him to resign.
23	23	"Inicia el juicio de Carlos"	14 March 2018	2.8
Leonardo and Roberto gather enough evidence to prove Carlos' innocence. The only inconvenience that is presented to them is that Alan refuses to testify to help his cousin.
24	24	"Carlos le pide otra oportunidad a Alejandra"	15 March 2018	3.3
Carlos obtains conditional freedom thanks to the good work of the law firm Vega y Asociados. Alejandra tries to be distant with Carlos, but he insists on recovering their relationship.
25	25	"Inicia la pelea por el amor de Alejandra"	16 March 2018	3.1
Carlos talks to Ricardo to thank him for all the support he gave Alejandra while he was in prison. Now more than rivals in the courts both will begin to fight for the love of Alejandra.
26	26	"Carlos desconfía de su propio primo"	19 March 2018	2.7
Carlos decides not to intercede in the investigation against Alan, in addition he infuriates when seeing that he did a bad administrative handling in his office that almost takes them to the bankruptcy.
27	27	"Alejandra rechaza la propuesta de Carlos"	20 March 2018	2.9
Carlos proposes Alejandra to leave Vega y Asociados to litigate in his office. She flatly refuses and asks him to give her her space.
28	28	"Olivia denuncia el robo de Arturo"	21 March 2018	3.2
With the help of Leonardo, Olivia decides to denounce Arturo's theft. Victoria, Roberto and Ricardo begin to investigate to do justice and take to prison the man who made fun of his friend.
29	29	"Leticia quiere su propio bufete"	22 March 2018	3.1
After winning Milena's trial, Leticia's ego increases and she asks Benjamin to join her to have her own law firm. With a powerful law firm they would stop receiving orders from Alonso.
30	30	"Alejandra explota contra Carlos y termina su noviazgo"	23 March 2018	2.7
Alejandra does not manage to regain her trust in Carlos after his betrayal and he claims that she has a special interest in Ricardo, she does not tolerate it and explodes by ending their relationship.
31	31	"Carlos acepta un sucio negocio"	26 March 2018	2.8
Carlos returns to the prison to fulfill the promise to help the "blind" and get him out of jail. By accepting the case, his reward is a large amount of money that will benefit his firm.
32	32	"Roberto logra que Nora obtenga su libertad"	27 March 2018	2.9
Nora has a second chance and this time Roberto takes her defense, with the necessary evidence he manages to prove her innocence and the judge leaves her at freedom, but without punishing Alan for his mistake.
33	33	"Victoria gana el caso de Sol"	28 March 2018	2.9
Victoria studies the case of Sol and manages to have the necessary arguments for the judge to grant her a retroactive economic pension because her father was absent from birth.
34	34	"Inicia el juicio de Alberto"	29 March 2018	2.4
Roberto calls Alberto to testify and talks about the incident that occurred the night he killed Ramón. Despite her pain Fanny, the wife of the deceased also declares that justice is expected.
35	35	"Fanny le pide ayuda a Roberto"	30 March 2018	2.2
Roberto manages to let his friend Alberto go free, but Fanny discovers the truth about the trap that Ramón and Berenice planned as lovers and fears that the murder was planned.
36	36	"Alejandra logra ayudar al Sr. Pérez"	2 April 2018	2.9
Finally, Alejandra gets Marcela to sign the agreement so that Mr. Pérez gets custody of his son and she does not go to jail for attempted kidnapping. Alejandra closes this case successfully.
37	37	"Asaltante atropellado"	3 April 2018	3.1
Fabián is taken to the Public Ministry after running over a guy who executed a robbery. Leonardo takes charge of this case and gets enough evidence to prove his innocence.
38	38	"Ricardo se enfrenta a los hijos de Joel"	4 April 2018	3.0
Ricardo suffers the death of Joel and his colleagues in the firm are responsible for helping him to cremate the body. Already at the wake, Joel's children make a fuss and fight with Ricardo.
39	39	"Gustavo mira a Alejandra como una enemiga"	5 April 2018	3.1
Gustavo tries to convince Isabel not to get divorced, but she refuses. He infuriates and gives Alejandra a proposal of minimum pension so that Isabel does not want to separate.
40	40	"Alejandra prefiere seguir sola"	6 April 2018	3.2
Alejandra tells Carlos that she does not intend to resume their relationship and that the apartment they were planning to buy, she does not want it anymore. Ricardo confuses things and thinks that he has already lost Alejandra.
41	41	"Ricardo pone fin a su relación con Alejandra"	9 April 2018	3.1
Ricardo decides to give space to Alejandra and asks her to take her path. Disappointed by his attitude, she accepts that from now on both of them will see each other as mere coworkers.
42	42	"Juan averigua cosas importantes sobre Tatiana"	10 April 2018	3.0
Juan advances in his research and manages to find out that Tatiana is a single mother, also always had great rivalry with Patricia to try to get rich and powerful clients.
43	43	"El bufete de Vega se une por el caso de Alexa"	11 April 2018	3.5
Leonardo and Ricardo expose that they will take the case of Alexa, Alonso is outraged by this crime and gives them all the support of the law firm so that the aggressors pay for their crime.
44	44	"Olivia y Leticia se enfrentan a un caso de falsa publicidad"	12 April 2018	3.1
Olivia and Leticia receive Juan José, a client who asks for help to sue a deodorant brand that promises to be successful with women and he remains completely alone to date.
45	45	"Juan pide la ayuda de Tatiana"	13 April 2018	3.1
Juan manages to contact Tatiana and asks her to help him with the case of Patricia's death, since it is very important for him that her death does not go unpunished.
46	46	"Carlos renuncia a Alejandra para siempre"	16 April 2018	3.0
Alejandra continues indifferent with Carlos, because she does not forgive the betrayal that he did just before getting married, he decides to renounce his love.
47	47	"Juan logra que Tatiana confiese la verdad"	17 April 2018	3.1
Tatiana reveals to Juan what happened the day Patricia died. Ricardo fights for justice in the case of Alexa and faces one of her assailants. Carlos manages to make "El ciego" go free.
48	48	"La policía arresta a Octavio"	18 April 2018	2.9
Alejandra questions Carlos why he helped "El ciego" out of jail, while Octavio is arrested by the authorities.
49	49	"Ricardo busca reconquistar a Alejandra"	19 April 2018	2.9
Ricardo finds out that Alejandra and Carlos are no longer a couple, he decides to look for her and try to win her back, but Alejandra feels disappointed in him.
50	50	"Alexa se niega a enfrentar a sus agresores"	20 April 2018	3.1
Alejandra manages to help Ricardo to expedite the extradition of Francisco. With this great step the trial could be advanced, unfortunately Alexa refuses to face her aggressors.
51	51	"Carlos le propone un jugoso negocio a Benjamín"	23 April 2018	2.9
Carlos dines with Benjamín to see if he is legit and contemplate him as an ally to wash the money of the blind man. Benjamín is interested in the large business and accepts without problems.
52	52	"Alonso toma el caso de Alexa y promete hacer justicia"	24 April 2018	2.8
The evidence that Leonardo presents at Alexa's trial are denied and the judge leaves the aggressors at liberty. Alonso finds out about this and decides to take the case to prove that Marrufo was sold.
53	53	"Carlos asesora al juez Marrufo"	25 April 2018	2.9
Alonso manages to intimidate Judge Marrufo and warns him that he will seek to dismiss him from his post because he allowed himself to be bribed. With the fear of being discovered, Marrufo seeks Carlos and asks for his help.
54	54	"Un nuevo caso conmociona a Alejandra"	26 April 2018	3.1
Pilar arrives at her house and finds her two bloodied children. Alejandra watches the news and learns of this violent event where the death of a minor is confirmed.
55	55	"Carlos toma el caso de Imelda"	27 April 2018	3.0
Pilar asks Carlos for help to get her daughter's boyfriend to jail for killing her son and hurting Imelda. Carlos accepts the case and begins the investigation to stop Vicente.
56	56	"El Ciego enfurece contra Carlos"	30 April 2018	2.3
El Ciego is upset with Carlos and demands that he have his money clean as soon as possible. Carlos pressures Alan to have the foundation papers ready and start working immediately.
57	57	"Elena ya no quiere a Ricardo en su vida"	1 May 2018	2.8
Elena gets the worst of the surprises when she finds Alejandra in Ricardo's apartment. To take revenge she uses her children and warns Ricardo that he will not be able to see them anymore.
58	58	"Elena busca el consuelo y la ayuda de Carlos"	2 May 2018	2.9
Elena seeks Carlos to help her prevent Ricardo from approaching her children. Carlos is enraged to learn that Alejandra and Ricardo already have a relationship and spent the night together.
59	59	"Se hace justicia para Alexa"	3 May 2018	3.3
Alonso manages to get Francisco and his friends sentenced to forty years in prison for the damage they caused to Alexa. Hugo thanks the firm for having done justice.
60	60	"Alejandra encara a Elena"	4 May 2018	2.8
After receiving the restraining order, Ricardo is very affected by not being able to be with Federico and Natalia. Alejandra tries to compose things and speaks personally with Elena.
61	61	"Juan salva a Tatiana"	7 May 2018	2.9
Pedro continues to harass Tatiana and she asks Juan for help. He makes the quick decision to take her home and asks Susana for permission to give her asylum and protection, in which danger passes.
62	62	"Victoria quiere justicia para el Sr. Plutarco"	8 May 2018	2.6
The trial against Plutarco's son starts and Victoria collects all possible information to show that Álvaro can take care of his father without any problem.
63	63	"Leonardo enfurence porque Olivia sale con Alan"	9 May 2018	2.6
Leonardo is surprised to learn that Olivia is romantically interacting with Alan. Leo fears that Oli is in danger because Alan is a possible suspect in Patricia's death.
64	64	"Ricardo agrede a Carlos y Alejandra lo defiende"	10 May 2018	2.0
Ricardo becomes violent and claims Carlos for helping Elena. Alejandra takes Carlos' side and Ricardo is upset to see that she still believes in his lies.
65	65	"El juicio de Imelda y Vicente inicia"	11 May 2018	2.7
Carlos gives Pilar one last chance to confess to her daughter that she had sex with her boyfriend. The trial begins and Vicente declares that Imelda helped him kill his brother Eugenio.
66	66	"Leticia rompe toda relación con Benjamín"	14 May 2018	2.5
Leticia explodes against Benjamín for not giving her credit to Alonso about the investigation she made of the municipal president. She takes the firm decision to no longer help him and breaks off all relationship with him.
67	67	"Carlos y Ricardo se enfrentarán en nuevo caso"	15 May 2018	2.6
Ricardo looks for Carolina to reach an agreement on the inheritance of her husband. She decides to fight and approaches Carlos to represent her, he agrees to face Bustamante.
68	68	"Da inicio el juicio de Giselle"	16 May 2018	2.7
Roberto begins his defense to prove Giselle's innocence, with some arguments, gets the judge to grant her conditional freedom in what more evidence is sought.
69	69	"Benjamín amenaza con renunciar"	17 May 2018	2.5
Alonso asks Benjamín to help him in the case of the municipal president. This time Benjamín is quoted and asks to be a member of the firm or else he will look for another job with greater weight.
70	70	"Elena tiene un nuevo abogado"	18 May 2018	2.9
Carlos explains to Elena that he left her case in the hands of Aaron, he assures her that they will win and they will leave Bustamante out. Elena takes her children to the psychologist to show that Ricardo hurts them.
71	71	"Carlos inaugura la fundación"	21 May 2018	2.6
Carlos asks Alejandra to cut the ribbon to inaugurate the foundation that will help many women. In the big event "El Ciego" makes an appearance and makes Carlos very nervous.
72	72	"Jaime decide analizar el caso de Jacinto Dorantes"	22 May 2018	2.7
Jacinto Dorantes seeks the help of Jaime to defend him and face Alonso. Jaime decides to analyze the case, but warns him that if he finds irregularities, he will pay dearly for lying to the law.
73	73	"Los abogados llegan al congreso en Cancún"	23 May 2018	2.5
The office of Vega y Asociados arrives in Cancún, Alejandra is surprised to see Carlos in the congress, Juan fulfills his mother's dream and Alonso learns that Benjamin works for Ibarra.
74	74	"Leonardo le declara su amor a Olivia"	24 May 2018	2.8
Leonardo is very sincere with Olivia and declares all his love waiting for an opportunity. Oli is confused and must reject him because now she has a serious relationship with Alan.
75	75	"Una noche mágica para Victoria y Roberto"	25 May 2018	2.8
After having fun with their friends, Victoria and Roberto are left alone enjoying the tranquility of the night and the sea. Finally Victoria falls before the charms of Roberto and they kiss.
76	76	"El Ciego y Jacinto Dorantes se hacen socios"	28 May 2018	2.6
Jacinto seeks the help of "El Ciego" to get rid of a person who is intervening in his business. "El Ciego" has no problem in disappearing him and they agree to be partners to generate more money.
77	77	"Karina descubre la infidelidad de Benjamín"	29 May 2018	2.7
Karina surprises her husband just at the moment when he was intimate with Leticia. The situation gets out of control and the entire office finds out about Benjamin's infidelity.
78	78	"Elena sufre un accidente y su vida está en riesgo"	30 May 2018	3.0
Elena learns that Ricardo took her children and immediately goes looking for them. For driving at a high speed, Elena and Miguel suffer an accident that puts their lives at risk.
79	79	"Jacinto acusa a Vega y Asociados de lavar dinero"	31 May 2018	2.7
Jacinto shows on TV the video where Benjamín agrees to launder money. Jacinto links this with the foundation and tarnishes the reputation of Alejandra, Victoria and the entire Vega law firm.
80	80	"Alonso corre a Benjamín de Vega y Asociados"	1 June 2018	2.9
Alonso is infuriated with Benjamín and decides to fire him from his office, also warns him that the police will begin to investigate and he will be in charge of putting him in jail.
81	81	"El Ciego somete a Jacinto Dorantes"	4 June 2018	2.9
El Ciego is upset to see that his foundation business was put at risk because of Jacinto Dorantes and his trap for Vega, so he quotes him alone to complain and make it clear who is in charge.
82	82	"Nuria mata a Daniela"	5 June 2018	2.8
Daniela arrives at Nuria's house hoping to fix their differences and be able to see her son. The argument goes out of control and Nuria attacks her with a knife leaving her covered in blood.
83	83	"Juan y Fer vuelven a estar juntos"	6 June 2018	2.9
Juan opens his heart and expresses to Fer how much he needs her in his life. She justifies her distance so as not to hinder her work, but Juan begs her to be together again.
84	84	"Benjamín se entera que Alonso lo denunció"	7 June 2018	3.0
Leticia informs Benjamín that Alonso decided to file a complaint against him to demarcate the money laundering law firm.
85	85	"Olivia termina su relación con Alan"	8 June 2018	2.9
Leonardo finds out that Olivia ended her relationship with Alan and decides to take advantage of that opportunity. Roberto and Victoria come together to make their friends finally have a relationship and can be happy.
86	86	"Elena aprende la lección y se muestra agradecida con Ricardo"	11 June 2018	3.0
Miguel's trial starts and Elena is called to testify, she denies her version of the facts and the judge sentences him to 10 years in prison. Elena thanks Ricardo for not leaving her alone.
87	87	"Alonzo reúne a todo su bufete para ayudar a Gustavo"	12 June 2018	2.9
Alonso finds out that Ramiro was already arrested and immediately gathers his team to analyze the arguments that Gustavo will present at the constructor's trial.
88	88	"Benjamín es detenido por la policía"	13 June 2018	3.4
Benjamin proposes Leticia to escape together and enjoy a life full of riches. Leticia refuses to live like a fugitive and the police arrive by surprise to stop Benjamin.
89	89	"Carlos es detenido y pierde a Alejandra"	14 June 2018	3.0
Carlos is arrested again for the case of Patricia and Alejandra doubts his innocence. Seeing that there is no longer trust or love, Carlos asks her not to be close to him again.
90	90	"Leonardo y Olivia dicen adiós a Vega y Asociados"	15 June 2018	3.2
Olivia and Leonardo talk to Alonso about their departure from the firm. Leonardo decides to accept a large offer of work abroad and Olivia wishes to accompany him to soon form a large family.
91	91	"Isabel y Luis son asesinados"	17 June 2018	5.8
92	92	"Vega y Asociados continúa... y buscarán hacer justicia"	17 June 2018	5.8
Gustavo suffers the death of his wife and son, who were shot by the thugs of El Ciego. Alonso fears for the safety of his firm and tries to close it, but all join to convince him to continue in the fight and get justice against Jacinto Dorantes.
