= Juan Carlos Barreto =

Mexican actor

Juan Carlos Barreto Gómez
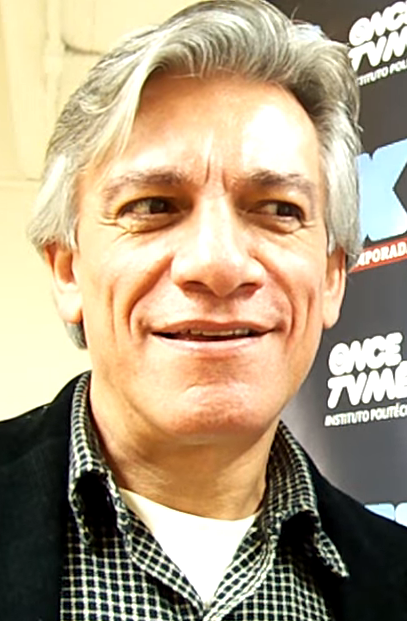
- Barreto in 2012
- Born: Juan Carlos Barreto Gómez; March 11, 1957 (age 69); Monterrey Nuevo León, Mexico
- Occupation: Actor
- Years active: 1989–present

Juan Carlos Barreto (born March 11, 1957) is a Mexican actor.

== Filmography ==
=== Selected film roles ===
Year	Title	Roles	Notes
2003	Lucía, Lucía	Assistant 3	Short film
2007	Quemar las Naves	Efraín	
2008	Tabacotla	Arturo	Short film
2008	Under the Salt	Sr. Zepeda	
2009	Backyard	Álvarez	
2009	Tres piezas de amor en un fin de semana	Andrés	

=== Television roles ===
Year	Title	Roles	Notes
1986	Cautiva	Alfonso	
1989	Simplemente María	Benito	
1995	Si Dios me quita la vida	Unknown role	
1997	Los hijos de nadie	Felipe	
2005	Corazón partido	Erasmo	
2008	Vivir por ti	Dagoberto González	
2009–2012	XY. La revista	Artemio Miranda	Series regular (season 1–3); 30 episodes
2009	Hermanos y detectives	Unknown role	Episode: "Diez minutos antes de morir"
2010	Locas de amor	Ricardo	25 episodes
2010–2011	Para volver a amar	Jaime Espinosa	Series regular; 146 episodes
2011	El Equipo	Elias Valenzuela "El Vale"	5 episodes
2011–2013	Como dice el dicho	Unknown role Filisberto Unknown role	Episode: "Hijo eres, padre serás" Episode: "Matrimonio y mortaja" Episode: "Cada palo aguante su vela"
2011	El encanto del águila	General Manuel González Cossío	3 episodes
2011–2012	Esperanza del corazón	Silvestre Figueroa	Series regular; 145 episodes
2012	Cachito de cielo	Tristán	Series regular; 98 episodes
2013	Mentir para vivir	Rubén Camargo	Series regular; 82 episodes
2013–2014	Lo que la vida me robó	Macario	Series regular; 102 episodes
2014–2015	Yo no creo en los hombres	Arango	Series regular; 74 episodes
2015	Yo no creo en los hombres, el origen	Arango	Television special
2015	Amor de barrio	Ariel	Series regular; 90 episodes
2016	El hotel de los secretos	Lupe	Series regular; 74 episodes
2016	Yago	Borracho	2 episodes
2016–2017	La candidata	Mario	Series regular; 60 episodes
2017	La doble vida de Estela Carrillo	El Sagrado	Recurring role (season 1); 13 episodes
2017–2018	Papá a toda madre	Nerón Machuca	Series regular; 96 episodes
2018–2019	Por amar sin ley	Jacinto Dorantes	Recurring role (seasons 1–2); 20 episodes
2019	La usurpadora	Manuel Hernández	Series regular; 25 episodes
2020	Vencer el miedo	Agustín	Recurring role; 40 episodes
2021	Te acuerdas de mí	Fausto Galicia	Series regular; 76 episodes
2022	La herencia	Modesto Pérez	Series regular
2023	Vencer la culpa	Enrique	
2024	El amor no tiene receta	Porfirio Villa de Cortés	
2025	A.mar, donde el amor teje sus redes	Ulises	
2026	Hermanas, un amor compartido	Delfino Olmos Reyes	

== Awards and nominations ==
Year	Association	Category	Nominated	Result
2011	Monte-Carlo TV Festival	XY. La revista	Outstanding Actor - Drama Series	Nominated
