= List of Corona de lagrimas (2012 TV series) episodes =

Corona de lágrimas is a Mexican telenovela produced by José Alberto Castro for Televisa. It follows a mother who worries about the welfare of her sons and is always willing to sacrifice anything for their well-being. The telenovela stars Victoria Ruffo, José María Torre, Mané de la Parra and Alejandro Nones. It premiered on 24 September 2012. In August 2021, following an eight-year hiatus, the telenovela was renewed for a second season that premiered on 29 August 2022.

During the course of the series, 222 episodes of Corona de lágrimas aired over two seasons, concluding on 27 January 2023.

== Series overview ==
Season	Episodes	Originally released	
Season	Episodes	First released	Last released
1	112	24 September 2012	24 February 2013
2	110	29 August 2022	27 January 2023

== Episodes ==
=== Season 1 (2012–13) ===
No. overall	No. in season	Title	Original release date
1	1	"Cambio de vida"	24 September 2012
2	2	"Falso suicidio"	25 September 2012
3	3	"Reproche"	26 September 2012
4	4	"Injusto reproche"	27 September 2012
5	5	"El primer encuentro"	28 September 2012
6	6	"Ardiente beso"	1 October 2012
7	7	"Refugio es asaltada"	2 October 2012
8	8	"Pelea entre hermanos"	3 October 2012
9	9	"Lamentable accidente"	4 October 2012
10	10	"Momentos difíciles"	5 October 2012
11	11	"Corazón roto"	8 October 2012
12	12	"Competencia por amor"	9 October 2012
13	13	"Automóvil prestado"	10 October 2012
14	14	"Cero tolerancia"	11 October 2012
15	15	"Confesión de amor"	12 October 2012
16	16	"Desconfianza"	15 October 2012
17	17	"Vecindad"	16 October 2012
18	18	"Amenaza"	17 October 2012
19	19	"Arrepentimiento"	18 October 2012
20	20	"Confesiones de amor"	19 October 2012
21	21	"Ambiciosa oferta"	22 October 2012
22	22	"Exámen profesional"	23 October 2012
23	23	"La tristeza invade a los Chavero"	24 October 2012
24	24	"Poca paciencia"	25 October 2012
25	25	"Dudas"	26 October 2012
26	26	"Nueva vida"	29 October 2012
27	27	"Renuncia"	30 October 2012
28	28	"Sin hijos"	31 October 2012
29	29	"Bendición"	1 November 2012
30	30	"Confusión"	2 November 2012
31	31	"Paparazzi"	5 November 2012
32	32	"Abuso de poder"	6 November 2012
33	33	"Encuentro"	7 November 2012
34	34	"Medios hermanos"	8 November 2012
35	35	"Refugio revela su secreto"	9 November 2012
36	36	"Divorcio"	12 November 2012
37	37	"Infidelidad"	13 November 2012
38	38	"Nana"	14 November 2012
39	39	"Mole de olla"	15 November 2012
40	4	"Lucero defiende a Refugio"	16 November 2012
41	41	"Suegra"	19 November 2012
42	42	"Diseñadora famosa"	20 November 2012
43	43	"Esbelta figura"	21 November 2012
44	44	"Borracho"	22 November 2012
45	45	"Notificación"	23 November 2012
46	46	"Reunión familiar"	26 November 2012
47	47	"Pelea de hermanos"	27 November 2012
48	48	"Detenido"	28 November 2012
49	49	"Embarazo confirmado"	29 November 2012
50	50	"Anfetaminas"	30 November 2012
51	51	"Seguro médico"	3 December 2012
52	52	"Nieta"	4 December 2012
53	53	"Búsqueda familiar"	5 December 2012
54	54	"Reconciliación"	6 December 2012
55	55	"Heredero"	7 December 2012
56	56	"Testamento"	10 December 2012
57	57	"Enfrentamiento"	11 December 2012
58	58	"Encuentro"	12 December 2012
59	59	"Despedida"	13 December 2012
60	60	"Flor queda inconsciente"	14 December 2012
61	61	"Reencuentro de hermanos"	17 December 2012
62	62	"Plan de venganza"	18 December 2012
63	63	"Consideración sentimental"	19 December 2012
64	64	"Beso de amor"	20 December 2012
65	65	"Declaración de amor"	21 December 2012
66	66	"Ácido fólico"	24 December 2012
67	67	"Edmundo se va"	25 December 2012
68	68	"Ingredientes"	26 December 2012
69	69	"Situación molesta"	27 December 2012
70	70	"Al acecho"	28 December 2012
71	71	"Advertencia"	31 December 2012
72	72	"Penosa interrupción"	1 January 2013
73	73	"Cínico reclamo"	2 January 2013
74	74	"Negocios sucios"	3 January 2013
75	75	"Frente a frente"	4 January 2013
76	76	"Cartas sobre la mesa"	7 January 2013
77	77	"Dolor en el vientre"	8 January 2013
78	78	"Difícil decisión"	9 January 2013
79	79	"Posibles aliadas"	10 January 2013
80	80	"Evasión fiscal"	11 January 2013
81	81	"Huída accidentada"	14 January 2012
82	82	"Heredera universal"	15 January 2013
83	83	"Millonaria"	16 January 2013
84	84	"Amargo descubrimiento"	17 January 2013
85	85	"Abandono de hogar"	18 January 2013
86	86	"Lazo sentimental"	21 January 2013
87	87	"A corazón abierto"	22 January 2013
88	88	"El Juez Marrufo"	23 January 2013
89	89	"Asesino"	24 January 2013
90	90	"Desesperación"	25 January 2013
91	91	"Posible descubrimiento"	28 January 2012
92	92	"Célula profesional falsa"	29 January 2013
93	93	"Verdadero padre"	30 January 2013
94	94	"Refugio enfrenta a Benjamín"	31 January 2013
95	95	"Le disparan a Edmundo"	1 February 2013
96	96	"Madrina"	4 February 2013
97	97	"Delitos contra la salud"	5 February 2013
98	98	"Amante"	6 February 2013
99	99	"Refugio no se deja intimidar"	7 February 2013
100	100	"Infidelidad al descubierto"	8 February 2013
101	101	"Contracciones"	11 February 2012
102	102	"Sexo del bebé"	12 February 2013
103	103	"Verdad al descubierto"	13 February 2013
104	104	"Sed de venganza"	14 February 2013
105	105	"Marco ve a Marrufo"	15 February 2013
106	106	"Invitación a salir"	18 February 2013
107	107	"Denuncia"	19 February 2013
108	108	"Boda en la cárcel"	20 February 2013
109	109	"Conmoción cerebral"	21 February 2013
110	110	"Almohada"	22 February 2013
111	111	"Los Chavero vuelven a ser felices"	24 February 2013
112	112	"Los Chavero vuelven a ser felices"	24 February 2013

=== Season 2 (2022–23) ===
No. overall	No. in season	Title	Original release date	Mexico viewers (millions)
113	1	"Hay que estar preparado para lo peor"	29 August 2022 (Note: Premiered early online through Las Estrellas website on 26 August 2022.)	2.3
114	2	"¡No, mi marido no!"	30 August 2022	2.7
115	3	"Me siento vacía"	31 August 2022	2.3
116	4	"Tengo que averiguarlo"	1 September 2022	2.4
117	5	"Mi mamá no me quiere"	2 September 2022	2.2
118	6	"Cobrar todas lo que me deben"	5 September 2022	2.5
119	7	"La confianza es como el cristal"	6 September 2022	2.3
120	8	"Van por la casa"	7 September 2022	2.7
121	9	"El hombre que necesitas"	8 September 2022	2.2
122	10	"Nada permanece oculto para siempre"	9 September 2022	2.0
123	11	"No quiero causar más desgracias"	12 September 2022	2.4
124	12	"Refugio es mejor mamá que tú"	13 September 2022	2.3
125	13	"Mejor es tener cuidado"	14 September 2022	2.2
126	14	"Yo solo tengo una mamá"	15 September 2022	1.8
127	15	"Vas a criar un nuevo Patricio"	16 September 2022	2.0
128	16	"La cuerda siempre se revienta"	19 September 2022	2.3
129	17	"Fue como ver al demonio"	20 September 2022	2.3
130	18	"Soy lo peor que te pude haber pasado"	21 September 2022	2.0
131	19	"Ya estoy en México"	22 September 2022	2.1
132	20	"La mala de esta historia"	23 September 2022	1.8
133	21	"La espera terminó"	26 September 2022	2.1
134	22	"Te quiero mucho"	27 September 2022	2.5
135	23	"Todo salió mal"	28 September 2022	2.6
136	24	"No es un juguete, es una niña"	29 September 2022	2.1
137	25	"Se acabó la tonta"	30 September 2022	2.0
138	26	"No es justo que se case"	3 October 2022	2.0
139	27	"Todos estamos en peligro"	4 October 2022	2.4
140	28	"Los declaro marido y mujer"	5 October 2022	2.4
141	29	"Que nadie empañe su felicidad"	6 October 2022	2.2
142	30	"Me quiero ir a vivir con mi mamá"	7 October 2022	1.8
143	31	"Aquí está tu papá que te va a proteger"	10 October 2022	2.3
144	32	"Patricio Chavero está muerto"	11 October 2022	2.4
145	33	"Nada me va a devolver a mi hijo"	12 October 2022	2.4
146	34	"Usted mató a mi hijo"	13 October 2022	2.0
147	35	"No me puedo dejar caer"	14 October 2022	2.6
148	36	"No tienes perdón"	17 October 2022	2.1
149	37	"Perdóname, mamá"	18 October 2022	2.5
150	38	"Mi hija por fin va a ser mía"	19 October 2022	2.4
151	39	"Te voy a extrañar"	20 October 2022	2.1
152	40	"Una muy mala copia tuya"	21 October 2022	2.3
153	41	"Una visita de familia"	24 October 2022	2.1
154	42	"Bajo nuestras condiciones"	25 October 2022	2.6
155	43	"Solo tú puedes salvarla"	26 October 2022	2.3
156	44	"Esto no va a terminar bien"	27 October 2022	2.4
157	45	"No hay que tentar al destino"	28 October 2022	1.8
158	46	"Yo seré tu donadora"	31 October 2022	2.5
159	47	"¡Te voy a robar!"	1 November 2022	2.4
160	48	"El amor es un trabajo de todos los días"	2 November 2022	2.5
161	49	"Aquí el único héroe soy yo"	3 November 2022	2.9
162	50	"La diferencia entre la vida y la muerte"	4 November 2022	2.5
163	51	"Quedamos como amigos"	7 November 2022	2.0
164	52	"Un favor para mi familia"	8 November 2022	2.5
165	53	"Mamita, no te mueras"	9 November 2022	2.5
166	54	"¡Rómulo no es inocente!"	10 November 2022	2.6
167	55	"Todo en esta vida se paga"	11 November 2022	2.4
168	56	"¿Qué me está pasando?"	14 November 2022	2.8
169	57	"¡Echaste a la calle a tus propios hijos!"	15 November 2022	2.7
170	58	"Baldomero nos echó porque le estorbábamos"	16 November 2022	2.9
171	59	"Yo voy a ganar al final"	17 November 2022	2.8
172	60	"¡Arresten a ese hombre!"	18 November 2022	2.6
173	61	"Algo anda muy mal"	21 November 2022	2.6
174	62	"Edmundo me dejó"	22 November 2022	2.6
175	63	"El precio que tendrás que pagar"	23 November 2022	2.8
176	64	"Tú qué sabes de amor"	24 November 2022	2.3
177	65	"¡No veo nada!"	25 November 2022	2.4
178	66	"Rómulo fue exonerado"	28 November 2022	2.8
179	67	"Esa tipa se quiere robar a mi hija"	29 November 2022	2.5
180	68	"Olvídense de mí"	30 November 2022	2.5
181	69	"Fuiste muy generosa"	1 December 2022	2.5
182	70	"Mátame de una vez"	2 December 2022	2.3
183	71	"¡Ahí viene la novia!"	5 December 2022	2.5
184	72	"¡Esperanza es mi hija!"	6 December 2022	2.3
185	73	"Me das miedo, mami"	7 December 2022	2.5
186	74	"Ya no puedo más"	8 December 2022	2.2
187	75	"Mercedes acaba de fallecer"	9 December 2022	2.2
188	76	"Me quedé sola"	12 December 2022	2.2
189	77	"Compartimos el mismo hombre"	13 December 2022	2.6
190	78	"Los legítimos propietarios"	14 December 2022	2.4
191	79	"Heredera universal"	15 December 2022	2.7
192	80	"La vida de ambas corre peligro"	16 December 2022	2.5
193	81	"¡Lo mataron!"	19 December 2022	2.5
194	82	"Tú la mataste"	20 December 2022	2.4
195	83	"Yo no soy un premio"	21 December 2022	2.5
196	84	"En nombre de nuestra amistad"	22 December 2022	2.4
197	85	"Vamos a unir fuerzas"	23 December 2022	2.2
198	86	"Yo tengo que ayudarlo"	26 December 2022	2.3
199	87	"Poco a poco se hace justicia"	27 December 2022	2.6
200	88	"Yo no maté a Patricio"	28 December 2022	2.4
201	89	"Un Chavero nunca se da por vencido"	29 December 2022	2.5
202	90	"Entre la espada y la pared"	30 December 2022	2.2
203	91	"El arriesgado trato de Rómulo"	2 January 2023	2.6
204	92	"¡No me voy a ir contigo nunca!"	3 January 2023	2.6
205	93	"No puede hacerse cargo de Petita"	4 January 2023	2.7
206	94	"¡No quiero dejar a mi mamá Cuquita!"	5 January 2023	2.7
207	95	"Me acabo de casar"	6 January 2023	2.6
208	96	"¡Me van a quitar a mi nieta!"	9 January 2023	2.6
209	97	"Horas críticas"	10 January 2023	2.5
210	98	"Espero sepas cuidar a Petita"	11 January 2023	3.0
211	99	"Petita sigue siendo nuestra"	12 January 2023	2.7
212	100	"Soy hombre muerto"	13 January 2023	2.9
213	101	"Edmundo Chavero murió"	16 January 2023	2.8
214	102	"¡Estás vivo!"	17 January 2023	2.6
215	103	"No tientes al diablo"	18 January 2023	2.8
216	104	"Nos vemos en el infierno"	19 January 2023	2.8
217	105	"Sentenciado a un año"	20 January 2023	2.8
218	106	"Atacar donde menos se lo esperan"	23 January 2023	2.9
219	107	"Tu padre no es quien crees"	24 January 2023	2.6
220	108	"Le esperan años en prisión"	25 January 2023	3.1
221	109	"El final de Rómulo Ancira"	26 January 2023	3.3
222	110	"El amor más puro"	27 January 2023	3.4
