= Corona de lágrimas (2012 TV series) =

Mexican television series

- Genre: Telenovela
- Based on: Corona de lágrimas by Manuel Canseco Noriega
- Developed by: Jesús Calzada
- Written by: Ximena Suárez; Janely E. Lee; Vanesa Varela; Fernando Garcilita; Roberto Castro; Gabriela Martínez del Río
- Story by: Manuel Canseco Noriega
- Directed by: Alejandro Gamboa; Roberto Escamilla Garduño; Juan Carlos Muñoz; Pedro Torres; Fez Noriega
- Creative director: Sandra Cortez
- Starring: Victoria Ruffo; Maribel Guardia; Ernesto Laguardia; África Zavala; Adriana Louvier; José María Torre; Mané de la Parra; Alejandro Nones
- Theme music composer: Kiko Campos; Gloria Aura
- Opening theme: "Corona de lágrimas" by Cristian Castro
- Composers: Armando López; Enrique Pérez; Sandra Valencia
- Country of origin: Mexico
- Original language: Spanish
- No. of seasons: 2
- No. of episodes: 222 (list of episodes)

Production
- Executive producer: José Alberto Castro
- Producers: Ernesto Hernández; Fausto Sáinz
- Cinematography: Narciso Ramón Colunga; Bernardo Nájera
- Editors: Arturo Rodríguez; Héctor Flores; Juan Ordóñez
- Camera setup: Multi-camera
- Running time: 42 minutes
- Production company: Televisa

Original release
- Network: Canal de las Estrellas
- Release: 24 September 2012 – 24 February 2013
- Release: 29 August 2022 – 27 January 2023

Corona de Lágrimas (English: Crown of Tears) is a Mexican telenovela produced by José Alberto Castro for Televisa, and premiered on 24 September 2012. It is a remake of Corona de Lágrimas, produced by Valentín Pimstein in 1965, being adapted by Jesús Calzada in the first half and Ximena Suárez in the second half. In the United States, it aired on Univision from 3 December 2012 to 10 May 2013.

It stars Victoria Ruffo, Maribel Guardia, Ernesto Laguardia, Africa Zavala, Adriana Louvier, José María Torre, Mané de la Parra and Alejandro Nones

In August 2021, José Alberto Castro announced a second season, that aired from 29 August 2022 to 27 January 2023.

== Plot ==
When Refugio and her three children, Patricio, Edmundo and Ignacio are thrown from their home, by chance of destiny they arrive at the city of Mexico, where they initiate a new life. Eighteen years later, they find themselves established in a small apartment in a popular area. She has a modest job, and although she has serious eye problems, she does not take care of her health by attending to the needs of her children. Patricio studies Law and dreams of a comfortable and prosperous future; Edmundo studied Medicine and is a bright but undisciplined student, and Ignacio was only able to finish high school because he works in a mechanic's workshop, helping his mother pay the expenses of the house and the studies of his brothers.

Patricio has become a boyfriend of Lucero, daughter of Julieta, who hosted them when they arrived in the city, but soon after, he rejects her when he meets Olga, a fickle girl whose fortune dazzles him, which leads him to be ashamed of his family and to lie about their origin, even going so far as to deny his own mother. Olga begins to doubt the lies of Patricio, reason why she spies him and discovers that lives very modestly. Exposed, he lies to her again telling her that Refugio was her nanny, and because she has a mental illness, she has to take care of her. She admires him for charity. Refugio tries in vain to make Patricio understand that with Olga he will never be happy. On the other hand, Edmundo begins to court Lucero, unintentionally hurting Ignacio, who loves her in secret.

Olga asks her father, the lawyer Romulo Ancira, to employ Patricio in his law firm. As the father is fed up with the whims of the daughter, he agrees and soon announces his commitment to marriage. As a result of his wedding, Patricio moves away completely from his mother and his brothers. When Refugio tries to approach Olga to recover the affection of its son, only receives humiliations; This causes disputes between Edmundo and Ignacio.

Patricio finds out that his father is not the same as that of his brothers; Accuses his mother of being unfaithful and demands that she never come back to him. As a result, Refugio falls into a severe depression that leads her to lose her job and aggravates her loss of sight. Neither Edmundo nor Ignacio seem to be able to comfort her, but they intend to get her out; Edmundo, looking for easy money with an illegal business, and Ignacio, in debt. Edmundo soon falls in jail and the situation is aggravated when Ignacio goes to Patricio to ask him to defend it before the law and this one refuses.

The marriage life of Patricio and Olga is a disaster. Olga gives birth to a daughter whom she rejects; this causes the truth about Patricio's origin to be known, and Patricio's world of luxury and comfort crumbles. When the man who ruined the life of Refugio and her children crosses into their lives by chance, Patricio learns the truth of his origin and the efforts of his mother in spite of adversity. The pain of his own failures, has overcome the arrogance of Patricio, who begs Refugio to forgive him and agrees to defend his brother, after which he recovers the family harmony.

== Cast ==
=== Main ===
- Victoria Ruffo as Refugio Chavero
- Maribel Guardia as Julieta Vázquez
- Ernesto Laguardia as Rómulo Ancira
- África Zavala as Lucero Vázquez
- Adriana Louvier as Olga Ancira (season 1)
- José María Torre as Edmundo Chavero
- Mané de la Parra as Ignacio Chavero
- Alejandro Nones as Patricio Chavero
- Lola Merino as Mercedes Cervantes
- Martha Julia as Flor Escutia
- Arturo Carmona as Apolinar Pantoja
- Juan Carlos Casasola as Benjamín Aguilar (season 1)
- Amairani as Erika Córdero
- Raquel Garza as Martina Durán
- Erika García as Magos (season 1)
- Ulises de la Torre as Agustín Galindo
- Mauricio García as Raúl Cervantes (season 1)
- Felipe Nájera as Marco Cervantes (season 1)
- Fabiola Guajardo as Norma (season 1)
- Axel Ricco as El Pollo (season 1)
- Elizabeth Guindi as Aurora Cervantes (season 1)
- Ilithya Manzanilla as Sandra Cervantes (season 1)
- Cassandra Sánchez Navarro as Chelito Durán
- Carlos Girón as César Durán Requena (season 1)
- Perla Encinas as Zaida Méndez (season 1)
- Pedro Moreno as Judge Julián Corona
- Ricardo Mendoza as Fidel
- Ivonne Herrera as Lula (season 1)
- Vicente Torres as Silvestre
- René Strickler as Lázaro Huesca (season 2)
- Sharis Cid as Diana (season 2)
- Geraldine Bazán as Olga Ancira (season 2)
- Ana Belena as Fernanda Varela (season 2)
- Lisardo as Dr. Rogelio Cáceres (season 2)
- Daniela Álvarez as Eréndira (season 2)
- Sebastián Poza as Renato (season 2)
- Claudia Zepeda as Rebeca (season 2)
- Paulette Hernández as Roxana (season 2)
- Pisano as Germán Morales (season 2)
- Carlos Velasco as Iñigo (season 2)
- Humberto Elizondo as Ulloa (season 2)
- Moisés Arizmendi as Bátiz (season 2)
- María Clara Zurita as Guillermina (season 2)
- Lara Campos as Esperanza "Petita" Chavero Ancira (season 2)
- Roxana Castellanos as Leonarda (season 2)

=== Recurring ===
- Mariluz Bermúdez as Cassandra (season 1)
- Demián Gabriel as El Pinzas (season 1)

=== Guest stars ===
- Alejandro Ávila as Baldomero Chavero
- Javier Ruán as Isaías Requena
- Juan Peláez as Eliseo Marrufo

== Production ==
Production of the series beginning on 6 August 2012. The series was filmed in several places of Acapulco, Zacatecas and Tijuana.

== Reception ==
Evita Muñoz reacted to the telenovela saying that it had nothing to do with the version produced in 1965; The actress commented that Victoria Ruffo should not have been chosen as the protagonist, because in the original version the actress was a little older.

== Awards and nominations ==
Year	Award	Category	Nominated	Result
2013	31st TVyNovelas Awards	Best Telenovela.	José Alberto Castro	Nominated
2013	31st TVyNovelas Awards	Best Lead Actrees	Victoria Ruffo	Won
2013	31st TVyNovelas Awards	Best Co-Star Actress	África Zavala	Nominated
2013	31st TVyNovelas Awards	Best Male Revelation	Axel Ricco	Won
2013	31st TVyNovelas Awards	Best Female Revelation	Cassandra Sánchez Navarro	Won
2013	31st TVyNovelas Awards	Best Musical Theme	"Corona de Lágrimas" by Cristian Castro	Nominated
2013	31st TVyNovelas Awards	Best Direction of the Cameras	Juan Carlos Muñoz and Alex Gamboa	Nominated
2013	Los Favoritos del Público 2013	Favorite Villain	Adriana Louvier	Nominated
2013	Los Favoritos del Público 2013	The Most Beautiful Women	Victoria Ruffo	Nominated
2013	Los Favoritos del Público 2013	The Most Handsome Guy	Mane de la Parra	Nominated
2013	Los Favoritos del Público 2013	Favorite Slap	Victoria Ruffo slapping Alejandro Nones	Nominated
2013	Los Favoritos del Público 2013	Favorite Finale	"Corona de lágrimas" by José Alberto Castro	Nominated
