= Porque el amor manda =

Television series

- Genre: Telenovela
- Written by: Alejandro Pohlenz, Marcia del Río and Ricardo Tejeda
- Story by: Jörg Hiller, Claudia Sánchez and Catalina Coy
- Directed by: Jorge Fons
- Creative director: Juan Carlos González
- Starring: Fernando Colunga; Blanca Soto; Erick Elias; Jorge Aravena; Claudia Álvarez; Carmen Salinas
- Theme music composer: América Sierra; Erick Rincón; José Luis Roma
- Opening theme: "Porque el amor manda" performed by América Sierra and 3BallMTY; "El amor manda" performed by María José
- Country of origin: Mexico
- Original language: Spanish
- No. of episodes: 182

Production
- Executive producer: Juan Osorio
- Producers: Roy Nelson Rojas; Ignacio Ortiz
- Cinematography: Gilberto Macin; Mauricio Manzano
- Editors: Rafael Minor; Felipe Ortiz

Original release
- Network: Canal de las Estrellas
- Release: October 8, 2012 – June 16, 2013

Related
- Por ella soy Eva; Libre para amarte; El secretario

Porque el amor manda (literal translation Because Love Rules, but simply known in English speaking marketings as Love Rules) is a 2012 Mexican soap opera produced by Juan Osorio for Televisa. It is a remake of the Colombian telenovela El secretario, produced by Juan Andrés Flórez in 2011.

Fernando Colunga and Blanca Soto star as the protagonists, while Claudia Álvarez and Erick Elías star as the antagonists.

== History ==
On October 8, 2012, Canal de las Estrellas started broadcasting Porque el amor manda weeknights at 8:25pm, replacing Por Ella Soy Eva. The last episode was broadcast on June 16, 2013, with Libre para amarte replacing it the following day. Production of Porque el amor manda officially started on August 13, 2012.

On March 11, 2013, Univision started broadcasting Porque el amor manda weeknights at 8pm/7c, replacing Por Ella Soy Eva. The last episode was broadcast on November 20, 2013, with Corazón Indomable replacing it. Starting December 2, Por Siempre mi Amor replaced one hour of Corazón Indomable, taking the former timeslot of Porque el amor manda at 8pm/7c until its conclusion on May 9, 2014.

== Plot ==
Jesus is a really nice guy; he is always smiling, caring and looking at the bright side of life. He works as a pizza delivery guy and in a restaurant kitchen, too. He also studies administration at night. He arrived in Chicago six years ago when he left his hometown, Monterrey, after ending a tormenting relationship with Veronica, who suffocated him with her obsessive order. When they broke up, he decided to change his environment and left Mexico, chasing the American dream.

Through a social network, he finds out that Veronica has a 6-year-old daughter called Valentina. Immediately, Jesus realizes that lovely girl could be his daughter, and bringing his past back to life, he decides to call his ex-girlfriend and discover the truth. Verónica admits Valentina is his daughter but tells him that she does not need him in her life since she is married to a wonderful man; but Jesus is eager to meet his daughter, so he decides to get back. Since he has no money saved, he turns to Ury, a Russian immigrant and regular customer at the pizza restaurant. Ury helps him by buying the plane ticket for him, but in return, Ury asks Jesus to bring a suitcase full of clothes for an orphanage. Jesus accepts right away, happy to have the chance to meet his little daughter; however, he is unaware that the suitcase has a hidden compartment with almost a million dollars in it. Ury calls Rogelio Rivadeneira, owner and chairman to a successful company, and informs him that his money is on its way. Rogelio is an arrogant and successful man for whom the most important thing in life is himself. Not even Alma, his beautiful girlfriend, comes first in his heart.

When Jesus arrives at the airport in Monterrey, he is arrested for money laundering and is presented before the authority. Unbeknownst to Jesus, he has committed a federal crime, and with no other options, he tells everything he knows. This way, Ury is arrested in Chicago, and Jesus is freed under custody. When Rogelio learns he has lost nearly a million dollars, he swears to take revenge from the one who spoiled his business.

With his life completely destroyed, out of money, jobless and now with a criminal record, Jesus must start over. He shows up at Veronica's and he can finally hold Valentina in his arms, but Veronica demands him to have a job and a place to live in order to let him see his daughter again. He later forms a friendship with Veronica's husband Elias Franco.

When Alma, Rogelio's beautiful and talented girlfriend, discovers Rogelio's brother, Fernando, having an affair with one of the company's secretaries, she decides angrily to get a secretary with whom Fernando cannot fool around, and plans to hire the ugliest one there is. However, it is destiny that brings Jesus to apply for a job there. When Alma and Jesus meet... something happens between them...their looks, their hearts, they have fallen in love but without knowing it.

Jesus is looking for a job in the accounting department, and Alma is looking for a secretary, but none of them clarifies that and Alma thinks it is not a bad idea to have an efficient male secretary instead of a sexy woman. Ignoring his criminal record, she decides to hire Jesus without letting him know the position for which he is being hired.

Jesus finds a place to live at a tenement house, downtown. There, he meets his neighbor, Luisa Herrera ( nicknamed "Chatita"), a sophisticated woman who is in the first phase of Alzheimer, but happens to be absolutely adorable. That woman is like a mother to him.

When Jesus is told that he will be the company's secretary, he rejects the job, arguing that he is more than just a secretary and leaves the company angrily. Chatita reminds him that if he wants to see his daughter, he is to accept the job. This way, Jesus goes back to the company, ready to become the best of secretaries; however, he is unaware that the company's owner is also the owner of the suitcase full of money that was confiscated at the airport. On top of that, Fernando, who is also going to be his boss, has decided to make his life miserable in order to make him quit and have Jessica back.

== Cast ==
- Fernando Colunga - Jesús Chucho García
- Blanca Soto - Alma Montemayor Mejía
- Carmen Salinas - Luisa "Chatita" Herrera
- María Elisa Camargo - Patricia Zorrilla "Pato“ De Rivadeneira
- Erick Elías - Rogelio Rivadeneira Ruvalcaba
- Claudia Álvarez - Verónica Hierro
- Jorge Aravena - Elías Franco
- Julissa - Susana Arriaga
- Alejandro Ávila - Fernando Rivadeneira Ruvalcaba
- Kika Edgar - Xóchitl Martínez De Rivadeneira / Natasha
- Violeta Isfel - Marisela Pérez-Castellanos
- Beatriz Morayra - Marcia Ferrer / Martha Ferrer
- Ninel Conde - Discua Paz de la Soledad
- Darío Ripoll - Oliverio Cárdenas
- Rubén Cerda - Gilberto Godínez
- Ricardo Fastlicht - Ricardo Bautista
- Ricardo Margaleff - Julio Pando
- María José Mariscal - Valentina Franco Hierro / Valentina García Hierro
- Jeimy Osorio - Jéssica Reyes De Cardenas
- Antonio Medellín - Pánfilo Pérez
- Ricardo Kleinbaum - Malvino Guerra
- Enrique Lizalde - Sebastián Montemayor
- Sussan Taunton - Agente Delia Torres
- Juan Ignacio Aranda - Máximo Valtierra
- Raúl Buenfil - Lic. Cantú
- Marco Corleone - Uri Petrovsky
- Yhoana Marell - Minerva
- Mago Rodal - Domitila
- Eugenio Cobo - Padre Domingo
- Paulina Vega - Nancy
- Emmanuel Lira - Melchor
- Mario Discua - Gaspar
- Andrea Torre - Aída
- Adriana Laffan - Begoña de Godínez
- Julio Arroyo - Remigio
- Rafael del Villar - Eugenio
- Luis Bayardo - Hernán
- Alejandra Robles Gil - Alejandra
- Ivonne Soto - Ivonne
- Daniela Amaya - Romina
- Thelma Tixou - Genoveva
- Laura Denisse - Laura
- David Ostrosky - Lic. Astudillo
- Mercedes Vaughan - Bárbara Martínez
- Nuria Bages - Teté Corcuera
- Helena Guerrero - Lic. Vivian
- María José - Lic. María José
- Marilyz León - Raymunda "Ray"
- Michelle López - Renato
- Thaily Amezcua - Virginia "Viggie"
- Elizabeth Guindi - Valeria
- Ilithya Manzanilla - Cynthia Cabello
- Paul Stanley - Melquiades Quijano
- Claudia Silva - Augusta Constante Durán
- Humberto Elizondo - Augusto Constante
- Gerardo Albarrán - Nick Donovan
- Pepe Olivares - Saturnino
- Paola Archer - Jueza Gisela
- Norma Lazareno - Tracy Rodríguez
- Mauricio Martínez - Héctor Rodríguez
- Eduardo Carbajal - Dr. Isalas
- Kelchie Arizmendi - Doctor Muñiz
- Jorge Pondal - Luigi Ferrari
- Iván Caraza - Doctor Gutiérrez
- Marco Méndez - Diego Armando Manríquez
- Arath de la Torre - Francisco "Pancho" López Fernández / Francisco Corcuera Peñaloza
- Mayrín Villanueva - Rebeca Treviño Garza
- Alicia Machado - Candelaria "Candy" de los Ángeles López Fernández
- Mónica Dossetti - Cassandra
- Marco Di Mauro - Himself
- Grupo Matute - Themselves
- Mariano Osorio - Himself
- Moisés Muñoz - Goalkeeper of Club America
- Miguel Layún - Player of Club America
- Andrés Bonfiglio - Detective
- Laura Denisse - Laura
- Jorge Alberto Suárez - Champiñón
- Catalina López - Hiena
- Yekaterina Kiev - Candela
- Ricardo de León - Receptionst
- Alma Cero - Luisa López
- América Sierra - Herself
- 3BallMTY - Themselves
- Ilse Ikeda - English Maestro

== Soundtrack ==
Track	Song	Performer(s)
1	"Porque el amor manda"	América Sierra FT. 3ballMTY
2	"El amor manda"	María José
3	"Vamos caminando al llamado de la luz"	Ninel Conde
4	"Intente olvidarte"	Palomo
5	"No me conoces aún"	Palomo
6	"Ayúdame a odiarte"	Palomo
7	"Te fuiste sin saber"	Fieebre
8	"Mi bello ángel"	Los Primos MX
9	"Pa salir de este infierno"	Palomo
10	"El primo"	Palomo
11	"Solo dime que te gusta"	América Sierra
12	"Ya no sé quién soy"	América Sierra
13	"Dulce Valentina"	América Sierra
14	"Eres tú"	Marco di Mauro
15	"No volverá"	Diego Verdaguer
16	"Gracias a ti"	Alejandro Ávila

== Awards and nominations ==
Year	Award	Category	Nominated	Result
2012	Premios Actrices Latinas			
2012	Premios Actrices Latinas	Best Couple	Blanca Soto and Fernando Colunga	Nominated
2013	Premios Juventud			
2013	Premios Juventud	Girl of my Dreams	Blanca Soto	Won
2013	Premios Juventud	What a Hottie!	Fernando Colunga	Nominated
2013	Premios Juventud	Best Theme Novelero	"Porque el Amor Manda" - América Sierra & 3BallMTY	Nominated
2013	Premios People en Español			
2013	Premios People en Español	Best Telenovela	Juan Osorio	Won
2013	Premios People en Español	Best Actress	Blanca Soto	Won
2013	Premios People en Español	Best Actor	Fernando Colunga	Won
2013	Premios People en Español	Best Supporting Actress	María Elisa Camargo	Nominated
2013	Premios People en Español	Best Male Antagonist	Erick Elías	Nominated
2013	Premios People en Español	Best Female Antagonist	Claudia Álvarez	Nominated
2013	Premios People en Español	Couple of the Year	Blanca Soto and Fernando Colunga	Won
2013	Premios People en Español	Best New Talent	Jeimy Osorio	Nominated
