= Marco Méndez =

Mexican actor and model

Marco Méndez (born Marco Anibal Méndez Ramírez on October 1, 1976, in Uruapan, Michoacán) is a Mexican actor.

Méndez began as a model and later studied acting in Televisa's CEA. He made his television debut as 'Oscar Méndez' in the telenovela, Las vías del amor. Subsequently, he appeared in various other telenovelas, as well as a few films. In the telenovela Muchachitas como tú, he portrayed the role of the dance instructor 'Joaquín', and in the telenovela Querida Enemiga, he played Dr. Bruno Palma.

== Telenovelas ==
- Nadie como tú (2023) as Abel Miravalle
- Amor dividido (2022) as Valente Tovar
- Por amar sin ley (season 2) (2019) as Javier Rivas
- Me declaro culpable (2017) as Javier Dueñas Lopez
- La doble vida de Estela Carrillo (2017) as Don Asdrúbal Guerrero
- Sueño de amor (2016) as Óscar Sousa Villaurrutia
- Pasión y poder (2015) as Agustín Ornelas
- Porque el amor manda (2012) as Diego Armando Manriquez
- Las Bandidas (2013) as Alonso Cáceres
- La que no podía amar (2011) as Esteban
- Triunfo del amor (2010) as Fabian Duarte
- Mar de amor (2010) as David Bermudez
- Los exitosos Pérez (2009) as Diego Planes
- Querida enemiga (2008) as Bruno Palma
- Muchachitas como tú (2007) as Joaquín Barbosa
- La verdad oculta (2006) as Carlos Ávila
- Contra viento y marea (2005) as Renato
- Mujer de madera (2004) as Alberto
- Amar otra vez (2004) as Gonzalo
- Rubí (2004) as Luis Duarte López
- Las vías del amor (2002) as Oscar Méndez
- Salomé (2001) as León
