= José María Torre =

Mexican actor and fashion designer

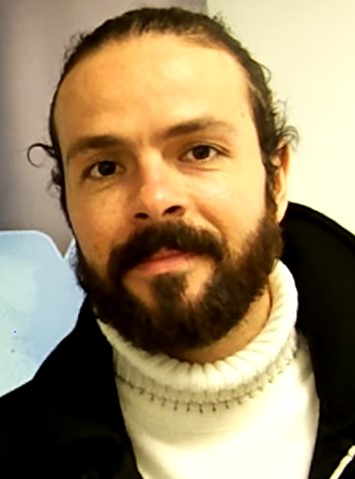
- Torre in 2012
- Born: José María Torre Hütt
- Other name: Chema
- Occupations: Actor, fashion designer

José María Torre is a Mexican actor and fashion designer known for his roles in telenovelas. He is the brother of Fátima Torre and Andrea Torre. He started his career at the age of five doing television commercials.

== Biography ==
Born in Mexico City, Mexico into a large family, that encompasses four brothers and six sisters, two of them are actresses: Andrea and Fátima. Jose María is Catholic.

He started his acting career at the age of 5 years old doing commercials. At age 12, he obtained a small role in the telenovela Yo compro esa mujer, playing the child version of Alejandro (Eduardo Yáñez). Later that year, he also appeared in Amor de nadie starred by Lucía Méndez. Three years later, he played the character of Lucero's brother in Los parientes pobres. In 1994, he also starred in Agujetas de color de rosa and also performed two songs for the telenovela's soundtrack: "Siempre estarás en mí" (duet with Irán Castillo) and "Cruce de sonrisas". Since then, he has made more than ten telenovelas with Televisa. In addition to his acting career, he also pursued fashion design; he released his line of clothes on October 27, 2005.

Several years later, he debuted in Telemundo and starred in Dueños del paraíso with Kate del Castillo and Jorge Zabaleta. In 2016, he obtained a major villain role in Señora Acero: La Coyote, opposite Carolina Miranda and Luis Ernesto Franco. Two years after, he returned to Televisa and joined the legal drama Por amar sin ley in the role of Roberto Morelli, one of the key lawyers of the Vega y Asociados law firm who falls in love with Victoria Escalante (Altaír Jarabo).

== Filmography ==
=== Film ===
Year	Title	Role	Notes
2007	Reevolución	Miguel	Short film
2009	Daniel and Ana	Rafa	
2010	Seres: Génesis	Bernardo	
2010	El efecto tequila	Diego	
2012	Después de Lucía	Joaquín	
2013	Sobre ella	Christian	
2014	The Popcorn Chronicles	Cristo	
2014	Más negro que la noche	Pedro	
2016	Sundown	Christian	

=== Television roles ===
Year	Title	Role	Notes
1989–1990	Hora marcada	Horacio (child) / Sebastián	2 episodes
1990	Un rostro en mi pasado	Roberto Estrada (child)	
1990	Yo compro esa mujer	Alejandro (child)	
1990	Amor de nadie	Richi	
1993	Los parientes pobres	Luisito Santos	
1994	Agujetas de color de rosa	Daniel Armendáres	
1996	Luz Clarita	Israel	
1996	Bendita mentira	Benny	
1996	Marisol	Daniel "Danny" Linares	
1997–2003	Mujer, casos de la vida real	Various roles	4 episodes
1997	Mi pequeña traviesa	Toño	
1998	Vivo por Elena	Julio	
1999–2000	Mujeres engañadas	Ricardo	7 episodes
2000	Carita de ángel	Leonel	
2000	Primer amor, a mil por hora	Bruno Baldomero Cano	
2001	Primer amor, tres años después	Bruno Baldomero Cano	Television film
2001	La intrusa	Aldo Junquera Brito	
2001	Salomé	José Armando	
2004–2005	Apuesta por un amor	Luis Pedraza	
2006	Duelo de pasiones	Ángel Valtierra	
2012	XY	Tony Hernández	3 episodes
2012–present	Corona de lágrimas	Edmundo Chavero	Also starring; 112 episodes
2013	Gossip Girl: Acapulco	Federico Zaga	3 episodes
2015	Dueños del paraíso	Adán Romero	Main cast; 67 episodes
2016	Señora Acero: La Coyote	Larry Pérez "El Cheneque"	Main cast (season 3); 80 episodes
2017	Guerra de ídolos	Isaac Solar	Main cast; 49 episodes
2018	Por amar sin ley	Roberto Morelli	Main cast (seasons 1–2)
2019	Médicos	Roberto Morelli	Guest star (with Altaír Jarabo)
