= Ilithya Manzanilla =

Mexican actress (born 1985)

- Born: February 15, 1985 (age 40); Mérida, Yucatan, Mexico
- Occupation: Actress
- Years active: 2004-present

Ilithya Manzanilla (born February 15, 1985, Mérida, Yucatan, Mexico), is a Mexican actress.

== Filmography ==
=== Film ===
| Year | Title | Role | Notes |
|---|---|---|---|
| 2009 | Paradas contínuas | Dara | Debut film |

=== Television ===
| Year | Title | Role | Notes |
|---|---|---|---|
| 2004 | Inocente de ti | Mónica Dalmacci | Supporting role |
| 2006 | Código postal | Dafne | Supporting role |
| 2010 | Cuando me enamoro | Arely | Supporting role |
| 2011 | Esperanza del corazón | Cassandra | Supporting role |
| 2012 | Cloroformo | Paula | Main cast |
| 2012-13 | Corona de lágrimas | Sandra | Supporting role |
| 2013 | Porque el amor manda | Lic. Cynthia Cabello | Supporting role |
| 2013-14 | Lo que la vida me robó | Angélica Arechiga | Supporting role |
| 2018-19 | Por amar sin ley | Olivia Suárez | Main cast (Season 1); Guest role (Season 2) |
