= Manuel Balbi =

Mexican actor

- Born: Manuel Balbi Rojas; 13 March 1978 (age 48); Guadalajara, Jalisco, Mexico
- Occupation: Actor
- Years active: 2000-present

Manuel Balbi (born March 13, 1978, Guadalajara, Jalisco, Mexico), is a Mexican actor, known for Seres: Genesis (2010), Casi treinta (2014) and Agua y aceite (2002).

== Career ==
He began his acting studies in the city of San Luis Potosi to 16 years at a stunt and as props in a theater workshop of the Mexican Social Security Institute (IMSS) in the state capital. In 1996, at age 18, he moved to Mexico City, after being accepted into the acting school of the telecommunications company Televisa's Center for Artistic Education (CEA). For three years, studying, and professional manner, taking acting classes in theater, television, film and text analysis, theater history, psychology, dance styles, jazz, classical, body language, vocalization and voice of the body.

== Television roles ==
Year	Title	Role	Notes
2000	Siempre te amaré	Unknown role	
2001	Amigas y rivales	Unknown role	
2002	Tal para cual	Unknown role	
2002	Agua y aceite	Patricio	
2004	Gitanas	Mirko	
2005	Decisiones de famosos	Nicolás	Episode: "La profesora de química"
2005–2006	La Tormenta	Jesús Niño Camacho Segura	
2006–2007	La viuda de Blanco	Megateo Díaz	
2008	Deseo prohibido	Juan Antonio Zedeño	
2009	Vuélveme a querer	Rafael Mejía	
2010	Las Aparicio	Mauro Valencia	
2012	Rosa Diamante	Gabriel Robles	
2013	Fortuna	Jerónimo Durán	
2013	La Patrona	Fernando Beltrán	29 episodes
2014	El Mariachi	Víctor Cruz	
2014–2017	El Señor de los Cielos	Rodrigo Rivero Lanz	233 episodes
2016	Dios Inc.	David Cohen	9 episodes
2017	Ingobernable	Jorge Antonio	Episode: "The Decision"
2017	Guerra de ídolos	David	4 episodes
2017	Pedro perdió la cabeza	Juan, the Hermit	Episodes: "Camping Trip"
2018	José José, el príncipe de la canción	Nacho	4 episodes
2018–2019	Por amar sin ley	Leonardo Morán	Main role (seasons 1–2); 132 episodes
2018–2019	Falsa identidad	Eliseo Hidalgo	Series regular (season 1); 37 episodes
2019–2021	El Dragón: Return of a Warrior	Héctor Bernal	Co Protagonist
2020–2021	100 días para enamorarnos	Fernando Barroso	Co Protagonist

== Awards and nominations ==
Year	Award	Category	Work	Result
2015	Your World Awards	Best Supporting Actor: Series	El Señor de los Cielos	Nominated

== See also ==
- Mexican people of Italian descent
