= Silvia Derbez filmography =

This article presents the filmography of Mexican actress Silvia Derbez.

== Filmography ==
=== Cameos ===
Year	Title	Role	Notes
2005-09	Vecinos	Herself	107 episodes
2013	No se aceptan devoluciones	Mamá	Dedicatee

=== Television ===
Year	Title	Role	Notes
1957	Noches de angustia		
1958	Senda prohibida	Nora	Protagonist
1958	Un paso al abismo		
1960	Elisa	Elisa	
1961	Elena	Elena	
1961	Bajo la sombra de los almendros		
1962	Penumbra		
1963	Lo imperdonable	Amalia	
1963	La culpa de los padres		
1964	Gran teatro		
1964	La doctora		
1964	Central de emergencia		
1966	María Isabel	María Isabel	
1966	La sombra del pecado		
1967	Un ángel en el fango		
1967	Amor sublime		
1967	No quiero lágrimas		
1968	Mariana	Mariana	
1968	Cruz de amor		
1968	Cárcel de mujeres		
1969	Una plegaria en el camino		
1970	Angelitos negros		
1971	El vagabundo		
1971	La recogida		
1971	El derecho de los hijos		
1971	El amor tiene cara de mujer	Laura Valdéz	Main protagonist
1973	Amaras a tu prójimo		
1974	Ana del aire	Andrea	
1974	Marina	Marina	
1975	Ven conmigo	Caridad Escobar	
1977	Acompáñame	Amanda	
1978	Mamá campanita	Carmen "Mamá campanita"	
1979	Vamos juntos	Lupe Pistolas	
1980	Secreto de confesión	Alicia	
1981	Nosotras las mujeres	Alma	
1984	La pasión de Isabela	Ángela	
1987	La pobre Señorita Limantour	Pastora	
1989	Simplemente María	Matilde Carreño	
1993	Al derecho y al derbez	Herself	1 episode
1993	Papá soltero	Alejandra's Grandmother	Episode: "Todo arreglado" Episode: "Ya córtale"
1994	Prisionera de amor	Chayo	
1995	Lazos de amor	Milagros	
1996	Los hijos de nadie	Leonor	
1998	La usurpadora	Doña Isabel "Chabela" Rojas	
1999	Infierno en el paraíso	Angélica de Ordiales	
2001	La intrusa	Sagrario Vargas	

=== Film ===
Year	Title	Role	Notes
1948	Tarzán y las sirenas	Aquitanian	Uncredited
1948	La novia del mar		
1949	Allá en el Rancho Grande	Margarita	Uncredited
1949	Salón México	Beatriz Gómez	
1949	Dicen que soy mujeriego	Flor	
1949	El seminarista	Mercedes Orozco	
1950	Si me viera don Porfirio		
1950	Las dos huerfanitas	Mascotita	
1951	¡Baile mi rey!...	Conchita	
1952	Mamá nos quita los novios	Luisa Rosa	
1954	El río y la muerte	Elsa	
1954	La sobrina del señor cura		
1954	Dios nos manda vivir	Albertina	
1955	La mujer X		
1955	Las engañadas	Elisa	
1955	Father Against Son	Lucía	
1956	The King of Mexico	Toña	
1956	The Medallion Crime	Carmen Álvarez	
1957	Morir de pie	Martha	
1957	La esquina de mi barrio		
1960	El impostor		
1970	Quinto patio	Doña Blanca	
1970	Cruz de amor	Doña Cruz	
1971	Dos mujeres y un hombre	Viviana de la Huerta de Christie	
1978	El andariego		
1983	Hombres de tierra caliente		
1983	El ahorcado	Camila	
1986	Mientras México duerme	Suegra del taxista asesinado	
1987	La Coyota	Doña Remedios	
1993	Zapatos viejos	Miss Lucy	
1994	Muralla de tinieblas		
1996	El gato de Chihuahua		
1997	Reclusorio	Carmen Galicia	Segment "Eutanasia o asesinato"
1997	Pacas de a kilo		
