= List of Mexican telenovelas =

== Televisa ==
=== 1950s ===
Year	Title	Translation
1958	Senda prohibida	Forbidden Path
1958	Gutierritos	Gutierritos
1958	Más allá de la angustia	Beyond Anguish
1958	Un paso al abismo	A Step Into the Abyss
1959	Cadenas de amor	Chains of Love
1959	Cuidado con el ángel	Be Careful with the Angel
1959	Elisa	Elisa
1959	Ha llegado un extraño	Has Come a Stranger
1959	Honrarás a los tuyos	Honor Your Loved Ones
1959	Mi esposa se divorcia	My Wife Divorcing
1959	El precio del cielo	The Price of The Sky
1959	Teresa	Teresa

See also

- List of Televisa telenovelas (1960s)
- List of Televisa telenovelas (1970s)
- List of Televisa telenovelas (1980s)
- List of Televisa telenovelas (1990s)
- List of Televisa telenovelas (2000s)
- List of Televisa telenovelas and series (2010s)
- List of Televisa telenovelas and series (2020s)

== See also ==
- Television in Mexico
