= List of TelevisaUnivision telenovelas =

Logo of TelevisaUnivision since 2022.

Grupo Televisa is a Mexican mass media company (or television network) founded in 1951 by Emilio Azcárraga Jean. Previously known as Televisión Independiente de México, Telesistema Mexicano and Televisa, has four stations: N+ Foro, Canal 5, Nueve and Las Estrellas. The latter is responsible for the transmission of television drama productions since 1958.

'Senda prohibida', directed by Rafael Banquells, was the first telenovela produced by the network, which has 30 chapters and won a great success. Thus, investing in original serials and, with the beginning of 1960, decided to write more than twenty telenovelas in just one year. The indices marked by 'share' were satisfactory and continued with the project. With the advent of color television, 'El amor tiene cara de mujer' was written in 1971 and had 760 chapters, the telenovela longest of the network. Still, Televisa has partnered with broadcasters in other countries, such as Venevisión, which allowed the adaptation of Venezuelans serials, the Sistema Brasileiro de Televisão, which exhibited some works and prepared under Brazilian remakes Mexican texts, and also the Rede Record, which co-funded the plots 'Bela, a Feia' and 'Rebelde' with the chain.

In 1980, the network gave priority to Venezuelans and Cubans roadmaps Inés Rodena and Caridad Bravo Adams. Later, the infant soaps began to be produced, such as Carrusel, Alcanzar una estrella and Azul. The singer Thalía, also starred in the Trilogía de las Marías, originally from Rodena, which includes María Mercedes, Marimar and María la del Barrio. The latter is the biggest selling novel in the world and has been adapted in the Philippines. Thus, Televisa again invested in texts for children and adolescents with Luz Clarita, Gotita de amor, El niño que vino del mar, El diario de Daniela, Serafín, ¡Vivan los niños!, Alegrijes y rebujos, Primer amor, a mil por hora, De pocas, pocas pulgas, Clase 406, Amy, la niña de la mochila azul and Rebelde.

From the 2000s, the radio network began producing remakes of his earlier serials, as well as Argentine and Colombian texts, such as in Cuidado con el ángel, Sortilegio, Lola, érase una vez and Corazón salvaje. Then, in 2006, began using the system HD in 'La Fea más Bella'. Currently, there are six transmission ranges of telenovelas: 12h intended to productions with foreign networks; at 16h, 18h and 19h, the juvenile and the public at 20h and 21h at the adult audience.

== 1950s ==
Year	Title	Author	Director	Ref.
1958	Senda prohibida	Jesús Gómez Obregón	Rafael Banquells	
1958	Gutierritos	Estella Calderón	Rafael Banquells	
1958	Más allá de la angustia	Mimí Bechelani	Rafael Banquells	
1958	Un paso al abismo	Manuel Canseco Noriega	Rafael Banquells	
1959	Cadenas de amor	Estela Calderón	Rafael Banquells	
1959	Cuidado con el ángel	Fernanda Villeli	Ernesto Alonso	
1959	Elisa	Silvia Derbez	Rafael Banquells	
1959	Ha llegado un extraño	Miguel Ángel Ferriz	Rafael Banquells	
1959	Honrarás a los tuyos	Kenya Perea	Rafael Banquells	
1959	Mi esposa se divorcia	Fernanda Villeli	Rafael Banquells	
1959	El precio del cielo	Fernanda Villeli	Rafael Banquells	
1959	Teresa	Mimí Bechelani	Rafael Banquells	
