= La desconocida =

Mexican telenovela

- Genre: Telenovela
- Country of origin: Mexico
- Original language: Spanish

Original release
- Network: Telesistema Mexicano
- Release: 1963

La desconocida is a Mexican telenovela produced by Televisa for Telesistema Mexicano in 1963.

== Cast ==
- María Rivas
- Guillermo Zetina
- Aldo Monti
- Josefina Escobedo
- Raúl Meraz
- Nicolás Rodríguez
- Martha Zamora
- Pituka de Foronda
- Carlos Ancira
- Enrique Becker

== See also ==
- List of telenovelas of Televisa
