= Un original y veinte copias =

Mexican telenovela

- Genre: Telenovela
- Created by: Julio Porter
- Directed by: Pati Juárez
- Starring: César Bono; Julieta Bracho; Eduardo Alcaraz
- Country of origin: Mexico
- Original language: Spanish

Production
- Executive producer: Guillermo González
- Cinematography: Guillermo Orea

Original release
- Network: Canal de las Estrellas
- Release: 1978

Related
- Gutierritos (1958); Gutierritos (1966)

Un original y veinte copias (English: An original and twenty copies) is a Mexican telenovela produced by Guillermo González for Canal de las Estrellas in 1978. It is a remake of the 1958 Mexican telenovela Gutierritos produced by Valentín Pimstein.

César Bono, Julieta Bracho and Eduardo Alcaraz star as the protagonists, while Antonio Brillas, Teo Tapia, Gina Montes and Patricia Ancira star as the antagonists.

== Cast ==
- César Bono as Totopos
- Julieta Bracho as María
- Eduardo Alcaraz as Dr. Osorio
- Antonio Brillas as Chino Villegas
- Gina Montes as Patty
- Teo Tapia as Sr. Romano
- Patricia Ancira as Katty
- Sergio Bustamante as Sr. Legorreta
- Zully Keith as Marilú
- Mauricio Herrera as Gustavo
- Delia Magaña as Juventina
- Carlos Riquelme as Donato
- Luis Couturier as Varaltedelc
- Guillermo Orea as Victorio Pérez
- Rubén Calderón as Teófilo
- Alvaro Carcaño as El Borrachito
