= Silvia Caos =

Cuban-born Mexican actress

- Born: August 10, 1933; Havana, Cuba
- Died: April 16, 2006 (aged 72); Mexico City, Mexico
- Years active: 1958–2006
- Known for: María la del Barrio

Silvia Caos (August 10, 1933 – April 16, 2006) was a Cuban-born Mexican actress. She known for Quinceañera, María la del barrio and La Usurpadora

== Biography ==
Caos was born August 10, 1933, in Havana, Cuba. She left her country and went to Mexico, where she obtained her nationality and began her career as an actress. It debuted in 1958 in the telenovela Más allá de la angustia. Much of her career was developed on television, participating in more than 20 novels, among the most remembered Quinceañera, María la del barrio and La usurpadora. Also participated in films Matrimonio y sexo, Presagio and El mexicano. One of its most important roles and that is remembered today, is that of the Nana Calixta in Maria la del Barrio in 1995.

Caos died on April 16, 2006, because of lung cancer.

== Filmography ==
Films, Television, Telenovelas
Year	Title	Role	Notes
1958	Más allá de la angustia		
1959	Mi esposa se divorcia		
1959	Ha llegado un extraño		Supporting role
1961	Culpas ajenas		Protagonist
1961	No basta ser médico		Supporting role
1969	El ruiseñor mexicano		
1970	Matrimonio y sexo		Film
1975	Presagio		Film
1977	El mexicano		Film
1983	Viva el chubasco		Film
1992	Destinos	María	TV series
1997/02	Mujer, casos de la vida real		TV series
1971	Historia de un amor imposible	Flora	
1975	Barata de primavera	Elsa Cortés	Supporting role
1978	Las viñas de la ira	Patricia	
1978	Mamá Campanita	Josefina	Supporting role
1980	Corazones sin rumbo	Concha	Supporting role
1982	Por amor	Aurelia	
1985	Juana Iris	Petra	Recurring role
1986	Muchachita	Mérida	Antagonist
1987/88	Quinceañera	Consuelo	Supporting role
1990	Mi pequeña Soledad	Elodia Abascal	Supporting role
1990	Cuando llega el amor	Amelia	Supporting role
1992/93	María Mercedes	Nurse Alma	Recurring role
1995/96	María la del Barrio	Nana Calixta Popoca	Antagonist, recurring role
1996/97	Mi querida Isabel	Miguelina	Supporting role
1998	Rencor apasionado	Esther Monteverde	Supporting role
1998	La Usurpadora	Cenobia Rojas	Antagonist, Special appearance
1999	Nunca te Olvidaré	Serafina Pérez	Recurring role
1999	Alma rebelde	Martina Soriano	Recurring role
2001	Mujer bonita	Doña Blanca	Supporting role
2001	La intrusa	Evelia	Special appearance
2002/03	¡Vivan los niños!	Doña Porfiria Palacios	Recurring role

== Theatre ==
- Claudia - Jueza Mundoch
- La Tercera Soledad - Katherine Dulac
- Nube Nueve
