= List of Sortilegio characters =

The following is a list of the cast and characters of the Mexican telenovela Sortilegio, production of Carla Estrada and starring Jacqueline Bracamontes, William Levy and David Zepeda, based on the telenovela Tú o nadie produced in Mexico in 1985, with an original story by Maria Zarattini about the rivalry between two brothers over a woman.

== Main characters ==
=== María José Samaniego Miranda de Lombardo ===
- Played by: Jacqueline Bracamontes
- Protagonist

Beautiful young peasant, hard worker and naive. Possess a unique beauty. She lives with her father and her sister Paula. She ignores she has been the victim of a deception. After pretending to be Alejandro Lombardo's wife, Bruno married her to involve her in his plan to inherit his half brother's money. She gets shocked when she learns that Alejandro, her husband, had a fatal accident the day after their marriage. When she arrives at his home after attending the funeral, she discovers a world she never imagined, a world of luxury and money. Bruno shows up and explains her his motives and evil plans. María José refuses to be part of that plan, but Bruno assures to her that she might be sent to jail along with her family. She gets very impressed when she faces the real Alejandro Lombardo, who did not die. Maria Jose thinks that Alejandro does not believe that they are married and is afraid he might find the truth. Guilt harasses her and she decides to tell him the truth, but eventually realizes that Alejandro is not a bad man and she begins to feel some affection that grows into an immense love. She eventually gets pregnant with Alejandro's child.

=== Alejandro Lombardo Villavicencio ===
- Played by: William Levy
- Protagonist

Alejandro, is a young man, intelligent, handsome, bold and educated at a high class family. His mother dies during childbirth. Grows with his father, his stepmother Victoria, and two half-siblings, Rachel and Bruno, not knowing that there is a blood link among them. His father leaves him in charge of the family's real estate business. He is the victim of an assassination attempt carried out by Bruno, who seeks to inherit the family business. Alejandro is found unconscious by a man who then takes him to the hospital where he contacts his family, who believed him to be dead. He then returns home and is given the news that he has a wife whom he married in secret, a woman named Maria José. Alejandro does not recall ever getting married and claims he has never even seen Maria José, but his family believes that he is having blackouts because of the accident. Suspicious, he then decides to play along in order to investigate the reasons for the deception and who is involved. His perceptive nature leads him to try to unravel his doubts about her and Bruno, who are seen as the prime suspects about what happened. However, he starts to fall in love with Maria Jose and later they have a child.

=== Bruno Damián Albeniz Sarmiento / Bruno Damián Lombardo Sarmiento ===
- Played by: David Zepeda
- CoProtagonist

He is a tough-looking young man with an arrogant attitude. Raised in an upper class family, is ambitious and conceited. He is overrun with jealousy, envy and resentment toward his half brother, Alejandro, whose father left him the family business. He devises an evil plan to kill Alejandro and thus be in charge of business. To achieve his plans he uses Maria José, to whom he feels attracted. All he wants are women and the benefits you can get from them. His jealousy is the cause of his death and he threatens the life of his half brother. When he realizes he failed in his attempt to kill Alejandro, he is full of frustration and anger. He is jealous of him that he is beside the woman he wants, he clings to the idea of separating them and to achieve this he allies with Maura. In the end he is killed by Erik just before he tries to shoot Alejandro.

=== Maura Albarran ===
- Played by: Ana Brenda Contreras
- CoProtagonist

Maura is a woman of modern society, avant-garde and independent from a wealthy family, used to having everything she wants, for many years she maintained a stormy relationship with Alejandro. She felt in love with him but decided to take a break by ending it. After a while Maura still looks for Alex. When she learns of his death, her feelings also die with the hope of meeting him again. When she learns that Alex is married to Maria Jose she is going to prove the falsity and will try to destroy the marriage. She allied with Bruno, Ulises, and her sister, Lissete to make a plan to make everybody believe that Maria Jose has a lover. She ends in jail for her complicity with Bruno.

=== Victoria Sarmiento Vda. de Lombardo ===
- Played by: Daniela Romo
- Co-star

Victoria is a lady of society. A writer who is well respected and has very good values. She is married to Samuel but her marriage is failing. She begins a relationship with Samuel's best friend, Antonio. She becomes pregnant and gives birth to twins - Bruno and Raquel. The twins were raised believing Samuel as their father. Over some years when the twins are 6 years old Victoria is reunited with Antonio and gets married with him. Antonio has a son named Alejandro (Alex) with another woman. Alejandro's mother died while giving birth to him, so Antonio is a widow just like Victoria. They raise all 3 children together. Then one day Antonio dies in an accident. Victoria realizes that Antonio left in his will that everything goes to his son Alejandro. Victoria realizes that Bruno and his sister will receive a monthly salary from his brother Alex. She tries to support Bruno because Bruno is angry that his father left him nothing. She always tries to support Bruno even though she knows about the sibling rivalry. Victoria bears witness to disunity and hatred that lives within the family. She also loves Alejandro and supports his decisions. She starts to fall in love with Fernando, but decides that the relationship could not be, since he could be her son. But in the end love triumphs and they get together forever.

=== Fernando Alanis ===
- Played by: Gabriel Soto
- Co-star

Young man, kind, helpful, Alex's best friend and courageous. He comes from a middle-class family, has good manners and sensitivity. He has a pretty younger sister. Both are orphans and Fernando is desired to give her a good education, and finances her studies in America. Alex is like a brother to him, he is his confidant and knows how to keep his loyalty, a loyal friend who is always ready to help him. But Fernando has a big problem, he is in love with Victoria but keeps his feelings silent due to fear of rejection. However, in a moment he is determined to win her love. He gets what he has proposed, capturing the hearts of Victoria, but agrees to keep their relationship hidden from everyone else. When he discovers his sister's treason, who has collaborated with Bruno to harm the Lombardo family, he makes her see that she is helping a criminal. He's angry, but he does not leave her alone, since it is his duty to care for her.

=== Raquel Albeniz Sarmiento de Castelar / Raquel Lombardo de Castelar ===
- Played by: Chantal Andere
- Antagonist central

Raquel, the twin sister of Bruno, daughter of Victoria and Antonio, thinks her father is Samuel and falls in love with Alex without knowing is his half-brother. She is married to Roberto, even though she just married him because he comes from a well-known class. Rachel is materialistic and greedy, a woman completely embittered by his unsuccessful marriage. Raquel allies with Maura to destroy Maria Jose. Their economic situation is very comfortable, living from a monthly fee that gives her brother Alejandro and income of a mansion she inherited from his real father in the Pedregal.

=== Pedro Samaniego ===
- Played by: Hector Saéz

Pedro is a widower with two daughters, Maria Jose and Paula, with his salary of government workers in charge of keeping them until an accident leaves him incapacitated. Without helping her daughters, he gets into shady dealings with his friend selling stolen goods and unlicensed products, Bruno takes advantages of this offenses blackmails him to help control María José.

=== Paula Samaniego Miranda ===
- Played by: Wendy González

Paula is the younger sister of Maria Jose and the daughter of Pedro. She is a girl who dreams of a life of luxury and comfort, is the main supporter of her sister, whom she helped overcome the supposed death of her husband and then she was involve in the lie. When she lives in the Lombardo's mansion, she is happy that she has been served and treated like a queen, and ends up working in the Lombardo's company.

=== Felipa García ===
- Played by: María Victoria

Felipa is the faithful and the oldest employee of the Lombardo family. She served Victoria since her first marriage. When they leave for Europe, she was dedicated to look after the house they left in Mexico, and when Victoria returns, she is committed to support and serve her and her children, who see it as a family. An adult woman with her calm and wise wisdom.

=== Roberto Castelar ===
- Played by: Marcelo Córdoba

Roberto is a handsome, good manners and is very tasteful whose family is in ruins after being one of the most powerful of Mérida. Roberto is an ambitious man whose fear of being poor leads to marry Raquel, whose marriage is becoming hell, and where they are only united for the materialism. Roberto has a double life hiding his bisexuality since taking several lovers of both sexes when Ulises comes back he becomes his lover without knowing that he is playing with him and his wife.

=== Ulises Villaseñor ===
- Played by: Julian Gil

Ulises is an attractive man and charming, but hides his true plans, is submitted to the Lombardo family as a wealthy man when he is a poor man in search of money and power willing to do anything, even become Raquel and Roberto lover who brings them good money behind them. He is Maura's friend and is an allied in her plans simply looking for profit. Murdered by Bruno.

=== Doctor Hernán Plasencia ===
- Played by: Luis Couturier

Antonio Lombardo's old friend who manages to turn his friend and Adriana parents through a difficult fertility treatment, a doctor very successful and highly regarded in Mérida's, who attends Alejandro after his accident. He also is in love with Victoria, but she sees him only as a good friend.

=== Jesús "Chucho" Gavira Pérez ===
- Played by: José Carlos Ruiz

Country man dedicated to the breeding of small livestock that gives to live poorly, Chucho lived with his nephew Chencho in a small hut in the countryside, found Alejandro in the woods, with help from his nephew to take him the hut where the care until the ambulance arrives that carries him to the hospital.

=== Sandra Betancourt Miranda / Sandra Samaniego Miranda ===
- Played by: Jacqueline Bracamontes

Sister of Maria Jose and Paula, daughter of Elena and Pedro, Sandra has not had an easy life since her mother sent her to Spain, where she becomes an alcoholic and a drug addict, lover of Ulisses. She dies from a drug overdose.

=== Elena Miranda de Kruger ===
- Played by: Azela Robinson

Mother of Maria Jose, Sandra and Paula. Abandonment to Pedro with two of his daughters, Maria José and Paula. Planned a fake wedding with Christopher Betancourt and recognized as his daughter Sandra. After the death of Christopher, married George Kruger, a scientist. She is only interested in the fortune of her ex-father-in-law. Ends up in prison.

=== Lissete Albarran ===
- Played by: Daniela Luján

Maura's sister. She liked to live life with comforts and luxuries. Along with her sister Maura and Ulises they invent a lover (Mario Aguirre) for Maria Jose to cause conflict between her and Alejandro. But life gave her a lesson when she was diagnosed with Cancer. This led her to approach God and realize the things that really matter in life.

=== Terapeuta Irene ===
- Played by: Elizabeth Álvarez

She is Fernando's therapist. She falls for him.

=== Maya San Juan ===
- Played by: Mónica Miguel

It is the agent responsible for tourism in the Dominican Republic. Bruno who helps the judge to give Juventino Romero and try to help Alejandro and Fernando to come up with Bruno.

== Other roles ==
=== Guests ===
- Fernando Allende as Antonio Lombardo
- Felicia Mercado as Adriana Villavicencio de Lombardo
- Alejandro Tommasi as Samuel Albeniz
- Otto Sirgo as Jorge Kruguer
- Elizabeth Álvarez as Irene
- Aarón Hernán as Porfirio Betancourt
- Patricio Castillo as Emiliano Alanis
- Rosa Gloria Chagoyán
- Guillermo Zarur as Ezequiel Flores
- Adalberto Parra as Érick Diez
- Manuela Ímaz as Katia Alanís
- Rosita Pelayo as Mercedes "Meche" Brito
- Arturo Lorca as Arturo
- Willebaldo López as Santos
- Carlos Girón as Gabriel Brito
- Iliana de la Garza as Julia Fernandez
- Rolando Fernández as Gregorio Díez
- Patricia Ancira as Bertha
- Christina Pastor as Mary
- Christina Máson as Lety
- Lindo as Kowit
- Arturo Paulet
- Jesús Salcedo
- Susana Contreras as Celia
- Óscar Ferreti as Augusto
- Cerex Otero as Raquel (girl)
- Christopher Alexander as Alex (child)
- Mikel Mateos as Alex (young)
- Víctor Partida as Bruno (boy)
- José Miguel Borbolia as Bruno (young man)
- Alfredo Adame as John
