= Gutierritos (1966 TV series) =

- Genre: Telenovela
- Created by: Estella Calderón
- Directed by: Rafael Banquells
- Starring: Rafael Banquells; María Rivas; Mauricio Garcés
- Country of origin: Mexico
- Original language: Spanish

Production
- Executive producer: Valentín Pimstein

Original release
- Network: Telesistema Mexicano
- Release: 1966

Related
- Gutierritos (1958)

Gutierritos is a Mexican telenovela produced by Valentín Pimstein for Telesistema Mexicano in 1966. It is a remake of the 1958 Mexican telenovela Gutierritos.

== Cast ==
- Rafael Banquells as Angel Gutierrez
- María Rivas as Rosa Hernández
- Mauricio Garcés as Jorge Contreras
- Gerardo del Castillo as Mr. Martínez
- Josefina Escobedo as Rosa's aunt
- Patricia Morán as Elena
- Manuel Lozano as Medina
- Vicky Aguirre as Lupita
- Dina de Marco as Anita
- Carlos Navarro as Juan Ortega
- Elvira Quintana as Mrs. Gutierrez
- Miguel Suarez as Mr. Fernandez-Yanez
- Carmen Cortes as Sirvienta

== Other versions ==
- Gutierritos o drama dos humildes (Brazil version)
- Un original y veinte copias (1978)
