= Amor prohibido (TV series) =

- Genre: Telenovela
- Created by: Fernanda Villeli
- Directed by: Alfredo Saldaña
- Starring: Claudia Islas; José Alonso
- Opening theme: "Aquí estoy yo" by Lupita D'Alessio
- Country of origin: Mexico
- Original language: Spanish
- No. of episodes: 20

Production
- Executive producer: Ernesto Alonso
- Cinematography: Alfredo Saldaña

Original release
- Network: Canal de las Estrellas
- Release: 1979

Related
- Senda prohibida (1958); El dolor de amar (1966)

Amor prohibido (English: Forbidden Love) is a Mexican telenovela produced by Ernesto Alonso for Televisa in 1979.

It is an adaptation of the first Mexican telenovela, Senda prohibida, produced in 1958.

== Cast ==
- Claudia Islas as Magda
- José Alonso as Juan Manuel
- Liliana Abud as Silvia
- Ignacio López Tarso as Arturo Galvan
- Saby Kamalich as Clara Galvan
- Emilia Carranza
- María Rojo
- Miguel Ángel Ferriz
- Nubia Martí
- María Sorté
- Sergio Goyri
- Enrique Barrera Merino es Gustavo
