= Honrarás a los tuyos =

Honrarás a los tuyos may refer to:

- Honrarás a los tuyos (1959 TV series), a Mexican telenovela
- Honrarás a los tuyos (1979 TV series), a Mexican telenovela
