= Encadenada =

Mexican telenovela

- Genre: Telenovela; Romance; Drama
- Directed by: Manuel Calvo
- Starring: Ofelia Guilmáin; José Gálvez; Andrea Palma; Guillermo Murray; Emilia Carranza
- Country of origin: Mexico
- Original language: Spanish

Production
- Executive producer: Ernesto Alonso
- Running time: 30 minutes

Original release
- Network: Telesistema Mexicano
- Release: 1962 – 1962

Related
- Codicia; La gloria quedó atrás

Encadenada (English title:Chained) is a Mexican telenovela produced by Televisa and transmitted by Telesistema Mexicano.

== Cast ==
- Ofelia Guilmáin
- José Gálvez
- Andrea Palma
- Guillermo Murray
- Emilia Carranza
- Luis Bayardo
- Jacqueline Andere as Laura
- Mario García González
