= El diario de mi madre =

1958 Mexican film

- Directed by: Roberto Rodríguez
- Written by: Julio Alejandro (adaptation); Dino Maiuri (as Arduino Maiuri)
- Story by: Dino Maiuri
- Starring: Marga López; Roberto Cañedo; Aldo Monti
- Cinematography: Alex Phillips
- Edited by: Fernando Martínez A.
- Music by: Jorge Pérez H.
- Production companies: Películas Rodríguez; Estudios Churubusco Azteca S.A. (studios and laboratories)
- Release date: 15 May 1958
- Country: Mexico
- Language: Spanish

El diario de mi madre ("The Diary of My Mother" in Spanish) is a 1958 Mexican musical drama film directed by Roberto Rodríguez and starring Marga López, Roberto Cañedo, and Aldo Monti. The film was shot in 1956, and released on 15 May 1958.

== Plot ==
On the day of her quinceañera, a young woman prepares to run away with a married man, but before doing so, she finds a diary that tells the story of her mother's life.

== Cast ==
- Marga López as Merida Valdés
- Roberto Cañedo as Enrique
- Lilia Guízar as Elena
- Rosenda Monteros as Enedina
- María Teresa Rivas as Alicia (as Ma. Teresa Rivas)
- Angelines Fernández as Leonor
- Paz Consuelo Márquez as Angélica niña
- Ivan J. Rado as Johnny Smith (as Jorge Radó)
- Martha Elena Cervantes as Angélica
- Elda Peralta as Patricia
- Aldo Monti as Carlos Montes
- Armando Acosta as Hombre en festival (uncredited)
- Daniel Arroyo as Empresario (uncredited)
- Silvia Carrillo as Bailarina (uncredited)
- Carlos Robles Gil as Empresario (uncredited)
- Mario Sevilla as Doctor (uncredited)
- Manuel Trejo Morales as Hombre que acompaña a Patricia (uncredited)
- Aurora Walker as Profesora de baile (uncredited)

== Production ==
Marga López stated in her autobiography Yo, Marga that although she had danced since she was very young, she did not know that she had flat feet until the making of this film, where she plays a ballet dancer.

== Bibliography ==
- de la Vega Alfaro, Eduardo (1998). El cine de Marga López (in Spanish). Universidad de Guadalajara. ISBN 978-968-895-797-4.
- García Riera, Emilio (1992). Historia documental del cine mexicano: 1955-1956 (in Spanish). Universidad de Guadalajara. ISBN 978-968-895-343-3.
- Amador, María Luisa; Ayala Blanco, Jorge (1985). Cartelera cinematográfica, 1950-1959 (in Spanish). UNAM. ISBN 978-968-837-327-9.
- López, Marga; Vázquez Ramos, Marisol (2005). Yo, Marga (in Spanish). Grupo Olimpia. ISBN 978-968-5461-01-6.
