= Juicio de almas =

Mexican telenovela

- Genre: Telenovela
- Country of origin: Mexico
- Original language: Spanish

Original release
- Network: Telesistema Mexicano
- Release: 1964

Juicio de almas is a Mexican telenovela produced by Televisa for Telesistema Mexicano in 1964.

== Cast ==
- Miguel Manzano
- Ofelia Guilmáin
- Aldo Monti
- Ramón Bugarini
