= Eva Calvo =

Eva Calvo may refer to:

- Eva Calvo (taekwondo) (born 1991), Spanish taekwondo practitioner
- Eva Calvo (actress) (died 2001), Mexican actress
