= Una mujer (1978 TV series) =

- Genre: Telenovela
- Created by: Original Story: Irma Yaniré; Julio Porter
- Directed by: Miguel Ángel Herros
- Starring: Elsa Aguirre; Gustavo Rojo
- Country of origin: Mexico
- Original language: Spanish
- No. of episodes: 20

Production
- Executive producer: Miguel Ángel Herros
- Cinematography: Tony Carbajal

Original release
- Network: Canal de las Estrellas
- Release: 1978

Una mujer is a Mexican telenovela produced by Miguel Ángel Herros for Televisa in 1978.

== Cast ==
- Elsa Aguirre as Marisa
- Gustavo Rojo as Manuel
- María Rivas
- Miguel Ángel Ferriz as Beto
- Blanca Guerra as Mabel
- Martha Navarro
- Dolores Camarillo "Fraustita"
- Humberto Zurita as Javier
- Arturo Cobo
- Tony Carbajal
- Aldo Monti
