= El espejismo brillaba =

Mexican telenovela

- Genre: Telenovela
- Created by: Fernanda Villeli
- Directed by: Ernesto Alonso
- Starring: Ofelia Guilmáin; José Gálvez
- Country of origin: Mexico
- Original language: Spanish

Production
- Executive producer: Ernesto Alonso
- Cinematography: José Morris

Original release
- Network: Telesistema Mexicano
- Release: 1966

El espejismo brillaba is a Mexican telenovela produced by Ernesto Alonso for Telesistema Mexicano in 1966.

== Cast ==
- Ofelia Guilmáin
- José Gálvez
- Rafael Llamas
- María Douglas
- Juan Ferrara
- Rosenda Monteros
- Ada Carrasco
- Malena Doria
- Mario G. González
- Angel Fernández
- Lola Bravo
- Mario García González
