= El ídolo =

El ídolo may refer to:

- El ídolo (TV series), a 1966 Mexican telenovela
- The Idol (1952 film) (Spanish: El ídolo), an Argentine-Chilean thriller film directed by Pierre Chenal
- Andrade El Idolo, Mexican professional wrestler
