= Patricia Morán =

Mexican actress and socialite (1925–2022)

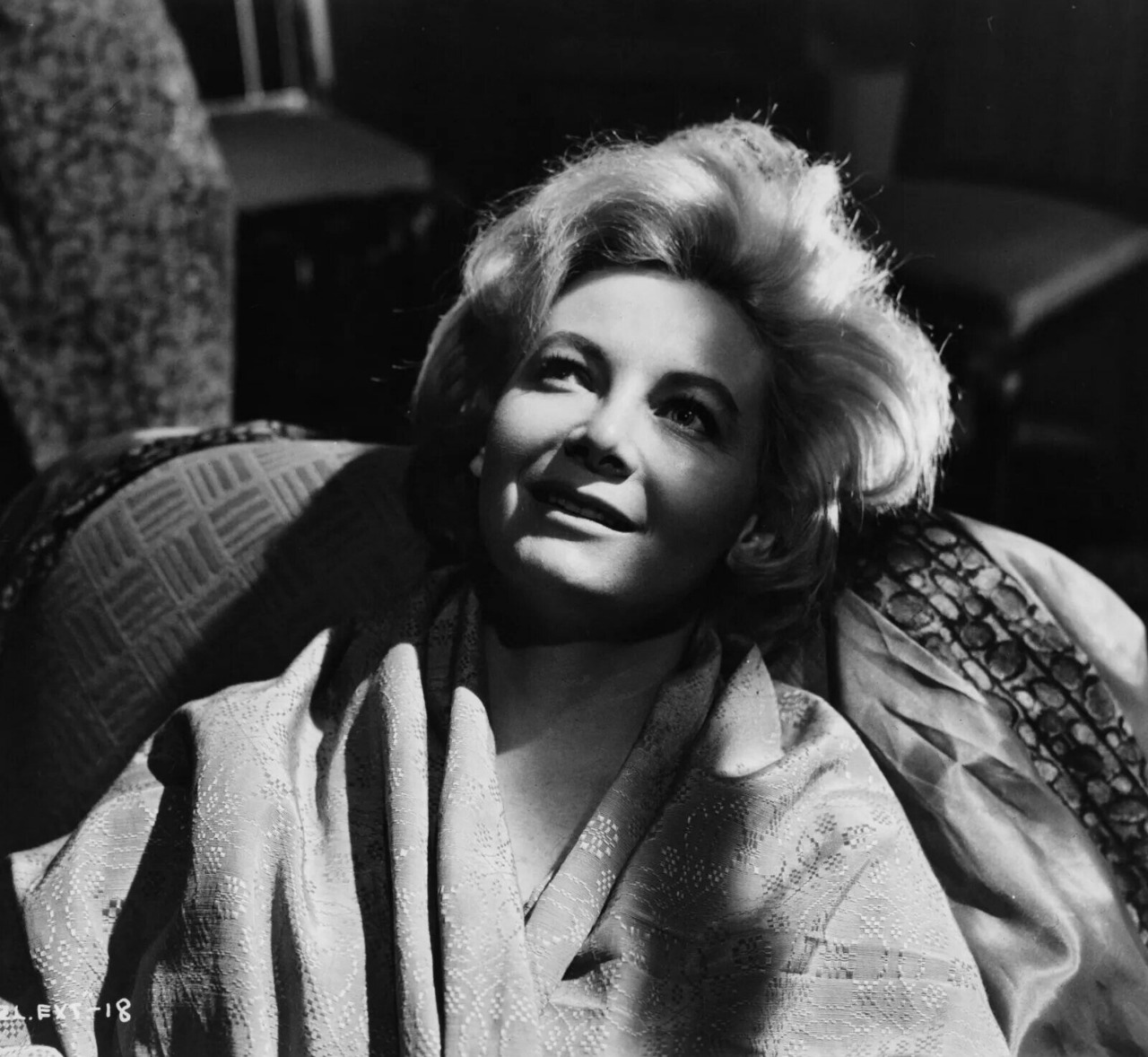
- Morán in The Exterminating Angel (1962)

First Lady of Chihuahua
- In office 4 October 1968 – 3 October 1974
- Governor: Oscar Flores Sánchez
- Preceded by: Honorata Díaz de Bustamante
- Succeeded by: Paula Aún

Personal details
- Born: María Blanca Caridad Ogilvie Clark Peralta; 10 September 1925; Tampico, Mexico
- Died: 24 October 2022 (aged 97); Mexico City, Mexico
- Political party: PRI
- Occupation: Actress

María Blanca Caridad Ogilvie Clark Peralta, known by her stage name Patricia Morán (10 September 1925 – 24 October 2022), was a Mexican actress and socialite. She was the wife of Governor of Chihuahua Oscar Flores Sánchez, who served from 1968 to 1974.

Morán died in Mexico City on 24 October 2022, at the age of 97.

== Filmography ==
=== Voice-over and dubbing ===
- Kalimán - Profanadores de tumbas ... Jane Farrell

=== Television ===
- Gran teatro (1963) ... Episodio «Cyrano De Bergerac»
- Teatro del cuatro (1964)

=== Films ===
- Una virgen moderna (1946)
- Camino de Sacramento (1946) ... Chica rubia en baile, no acreditada
- La mujer de todos (1946) ... Angélica
- Lágrimas de sangre (1946) ... Alicia
- Bel Ami (1947) ... Susana
- Yo soy tu padre (1948) ... Elisa
- Negra consentida (1949) ... Marta
- Cuando los padres se quedan solos (1949) ... Carlota
- Nosotros los rateros (1949) ... Elena
- Zorina, la mujer maldita (1949) ... Rosa María
- Otra primavera (1950) ... Cristina
- Médico de guardia (1950) ... La Moribunda, Carmen Rosado
- El amor no es negocio (1950) ... Susana
- The Dangerous Age (1950) ... Patricia
- La malcasada (1950)
- Muchachas de Uniforme (1951) ... María Teresa
- Cerca del cielo (1951) ... Cristina
- Dos vidas (1952)
- El ángel exterminador (1962)
- Si yo fuera millonario (1962)
- Romeo contra Julieta (1968) ... Mamá de Rodolfo
- El golfo (1969)
- ¿Por qué nací mujer? (1970) ... Tía Doro

=== Film producer ===
- Casting (2014) ... cortometraje, auxiliar de producción

=== Telenovelas ===
- Gutierritos (1958) ... Elena
- Puerta de suspenso (1959)
- Secretaria o mujer (1960)
- La casa del odio (1960)
- La sospecha (1961)
- La gloria quedó atrás (1962)
- Pablo y Elena (1963) ... Elena
- Madres egoístas (1963)
- La máscara del ángel (1964)
- La sembradora (1965)
- La búsqueda (1966)
- Gutierritos (1966) ... Elena
- El dolor de amar (1966)
- Amor y orgullo (1966) ... Ruth
- Detrás del muro (1967)
- Atormentada (1967) ... Margarita Alfaro
- Mi Maestro (1968)
- Aurelia (1968)

== Award nominations ==
Year	Category	Film	Result
1951	Best supporting actress	Another Spring	Nominated
