= Cuidado con el ángel =

Cuidado con el ángel may refer to either of two Mexican telenovelas produced and aired by Televisa:

- Cuidado con el ángel (1959 TV series)
- Cuidado con el ángel (2008 TV series)
