= El carruaje =

Mexican telenovela

- Also known as: El carruaje
- Genre: Telenovela
- Created by: Original Story: Carlos Enrique Taboada; Adaptation: José Antonio Monsell
- Directed by: Ernesto Alonso
- Starring: Carlos Monden; José Carlos Ruiz; María Elena Marqués
- Country of origin: Mexico
- Original language: Spanish

Production
- Executive producer: Miguel Alemán Velasco
- Cinematography: Guillermo Diazayas; Raúl Araiza Sr.
- Production company: Televisa

Original release
- Network: Canal de las Estrellas
- Release: June 13 – August 11, 1972

Related
- A Rainha Louca (1967)

El carruaje is a Mexican telenovela produced by Miguel Alemán Velasco for Televisa in 1972.

== Cast ==
- Carlos Monden as Massimiliano D'Asburgo
- José Carlos Ruiz as Benito Juarez
- Carlos Cámara
- María Elena Marqués as Margarita Maza de Juarez
- Fernando Mendoza as José Ma. Iglesias
- Aarón Hernán as Sebastián Lerdo de Tejada
- Andrés García as Tte. Azcárate
- Carlos Bracho as Octavio Rivera
- Susana Dosamantes as Concepción
- Salvador Sánchez
- Gerardo del Castillo
- José Chávez
- Cristina Moreno
- Nelly Menden as Carlota Amalia
- German Robles as General Escobedo
- David Reynoso as José María
- Norma Herrera as Sofia
- Ignacio López Tarso as Cura
- Anita Blanch as Esperanza
