= Magda Guzmán =

Mexican actress (1931–2015)

- Born: María Magdalena Guzmán Garza; 16 May 1931; Saltillo, Coahuila, Mexico
- Died: 12 March 2015 (aged 83); Mexico City, Mexico
- Years active: 1941–2015
- Spouse(s): Julián Duprez (divorced); 1 child Federico Falcón (1970–1981; his death); 3 children
- Children: 4

María Magdalena Guzmán Garza (16 May 1931 – 12 March 2015), better known as Magda Guzmán, was a Mexican film and television actress. She died of a myocardial infarction. Karina Duprez is her daughter.

== Filmography ==
=== Films ===
Year	Title	Role	Notes
1941	Noche de recién casados		
1948	Tarzán y las sirenas	Aquitanian	Uncredited
1950	Gemma		
1951	Girls in Uniform		
1953	Acuérdate de vivir	Elvira Macias	Uncredited
1954	La duda	Marta	
1955	Frente al pecado de ayer	Rosita	
1955	La vida no vale nada	Silvia	
1956	Con quién andan nuestras hijas	Beatriz	
1956	Llamas contra el viento		
1956	Rosalba		
1959	Manicomio	Elvira	
1961	En busca de la muerte		
1961	Confidencias matrimoniales		
1962	El fusilamiento		
1965	El juicio de Arcadio		
1970	¿Por qué nací mujer?	Aunt Ernestina	
1971	La sangre enemiga		
1978	La plaza de Puerto Santo	Hermelinda	
1980	La dinastía de Dracula	Doña Remedios de Solórzano	
1982	La casa de Bernarda Alba	Poncia	
1990	Ladrones y asesinos		
1998	Más allá de la usurpadora	Fidelina	Television film
2005	Club eutanasia	Doña Esperanza	
2007	Sirenas de fondo		Short film
2011	Viernes de Ánimas: El camino de las flores		

=== Television ===
Year	Title	Role	Notes
1958	Más allá de la angustia		Television debut
1960	El hombre de oro		Lead role
1960	Dos caras tiene el destino		
1960	Amar fue su pecado		
1961	Marianela		Lead role
1961	Las gemelas		
1962	La actriz		Lead role
1963	La familia Miau		
1963	El secreto		Lead role
1964	Siempre tuya		Lead role
1964	San Martín de Porres	Ana Velázquez	Lead role
1965	Marina Lavalle		
1965	Las abuelas		
1966	El medio pelo	Paz	
1966	El corrido de Lupe Reyes		
1967	Un ángel en el fango		
1967	El usurpador		
1967	No quiero lágrimas		
1967	Anita de Montemar	Carlota	
1967	Adriana		
1968	Pueblo sin esperanza		
1968	Mujeres sin amor		
1968	Los Caudillos	Josefa Ortiz de Domínguez	
1969	Cadenas de angustia		
1970	Yesenia		
1970	La Gata	Leticia "La Jarocha"	
1971	Muchacha italiana viene a casarse	Analia	
1971	Mis tres amores		
1972	La señora joven	Maura Montiel	
1974	Los miserables	Mrs. Thernardier	
1977	Acompáñame	Esperanza	
1977	Rina	Doña Chana	
1978	Santa		
1979	Muchacha de barrio	Rosa	
1979	El amor llegó más tarde		
1981	Extraños caminos del amor	Antonia	
1982	Al final del arco iris	Elvira	
1983	Bodas de odio	Carmen	
1985	Tú o nadie	Victoria Lombardo	
1986	Lista negra	Angélica	
1986	Cautiva	Aurelia	
1987–1988	Rosa salvaje	Tomasa González	
1989	El cristal empañado	Virginia	
1989	Balada por un amor	Beatriz	
1991	Valeria y Maximiliano	Eugenia Landero	
1995	Bajo un mismo rostro	Rosario	
1996	Te sigo amando	Ofelia	
1998	Vivo por Elena		
1998	La usurpadora	Fidelina	
1999	Infierno en el paraíso	Nanda	
2000	Mi destino eres tú	Nana Nina	
2000–2004	Mujer, casos de la vida real	Various role	5 episodes
2001	Sin pecado concebido	Eva Santana	
2004	Misión S.O.S. aventura y amor	Justina Aranda	
2005	Alborada	La Poderosa / Sara de Oviedo	
2007	Tormenta en el paraíso	Yolanda	
2008–2009	En nombre del amor	Rufina Martínez	
2010–2011	Para volver a amar	Conchita Cabrera	
2012	Amor bravío	Refugio	

=== Archive footage ===
Year	Title	Role	Notes
2011	Cuando me enamoro	Rufina Martínez	"Plan perverso" (Season 1, Episode 137)

== Awards and nominations ==
Year	Award	Category	Nominee	Result
1955	Ariel Award	Best Supporting Actress	La duda	Nominated
1956	Ariel Award	Best Actress in a Minor Role	La vida no vale nada	Nominated
1983	TVyNovelas Awards	Best Female Antagonist	Al final del arco iris	Nominated
1986	TVyNovelas Awards	Best First Actress	Tú o nadie	Won
2011	TVyNovelas Awards	Best First Actress	Para Volver a Amar	Won
2013	Premios ACE	Best Actress Characteristic	Amor Bravío	Won
