= El refugio (TV series) =

Mexican telenovela

- Genre: Telenovela
- Country of origin: Mexico
- Original language: Spanish

Original release
- Network: Telesistema Mexicano
- Release: 1965

El refugio is a Mexican telenovela produced by Ernesto Alonso for Telesistema Mexicano in 1965.

== Cast ==
- Ofelia Guilmáin
- Aarón Hernán
- Fanny Schiller
- José Carlos Ruiz
