= Llamado urgente =

Mexican telenovela

- Genre: Telenovela
- Country of origin: Mexico
- Original language: Spanish

Original release
- Network: Telesistema Mexicano
- Release: 1965

Llamado urgente is a Mexican telenovela produced by Televisa for Telesistema Mexicano in 1965.

== Cast ==
- Amparo Rivelles
- Ofelia Guilmáin
- Ada Carrasco
- Anita Blanch
