= Mi amor por ti =

Mexican telenovela

- Genre: Telenovela
- Country of origin: Mexico
- Original language: Spanish

Original release
- Network: Telesistema Mexicano

Mi amor por ti is a Mexican telenovela produced by Ernesto Alonso and originally transmitted by Teleprogramas Acapulco, SA.

== Cast ==
- María Rivas as Silvia
- Guillermo Murray
- Anita Blanch
- José Carlos Ruiz as Roque
