= Vida robada (1961 TV series) =

- Genre: Telenovela; Drama
- Directed by: Ernesto Alonso
- Starring: Claudio Brook; Eva Calvo; Carlos Petrel
- Country of origin: Mexico
- Original language: Spanish

Production
- Executive producer: Ernesto Alonso
- Running time: 30 minutes

Original release
- Network: Telesistema Mexicano
- Release: 1961 – 1961

Vida robada (English title:Stolen life) is a Mexican telenovela produced by Televisa and transmitted by Telesistema Mexicano.

== Cast ==
- Claudio Brook
- Eva Calvo (actress)
- Carlos Petrel
