= Marina Lavalle =

Mexican telenovela

- Genre: Telenovela
- Country of origin: Mexico
- Original language: Spanish
- No. of episodes: 73

Original release
- Network: Telesistema Mexicano
- Release: 1965

Marina Lavalle is a Mexican telenovela produced by Televisa for Telesistema Mexicano in 1965.

== Cast ==
- María Rivas
- Enrique Aguilar
- Narciso Busquets
- Guillermo Zetina
- Héctor Andremar
- Magda Guzmán
- Eva Calvo
- María Teresa Rivas
- Fernando Luján
- Lupita Lara
