= Nosotras las mujeres =

Mexican telenovela

- Genre: Telenovela
- Written by: Salvador Jaramillo; Margarita Villaseñor
- Directed by: Julio Castillo
- Starring: Silvia Derbez; Fernando Larrañaga; Beatriz Sheridan; Martha Roth; Sonia Furió; Anita Blanch; Eduardo Noriega
- Country of origin: Mexico
- Original language: Spanish

Production
- Executive producer: Irene Sabido

Original release
- Network: Canal de las Estrellas
- Release: 1981

Nosotras las mujeres (English title: We the women) is a Mexican telenovela produced by Irene Sabido for Televisa in 1981. It starred by Silvia Derbez, Beatriz Sheridan, Martha Roth, Sonia Furió, Anita Blanch and Fernando Larrañaga.

== Cast ==
- Silvia Derbez as Alma
- Beatriz Sheridan as Edna
- Martha Roth as Monica
- Sonia Furió as Ivonne
- Anita Blanch as Beatriz
- Fernando Larrañaga as Manuel
- Eduardo Noriega as Agustin
- María Rojo as Ana
- Claudio Obregon as Luis Mariano
- Sergio Jimenez as Max
- Queta Lavat as Aida
- Adriana Parra as Estela
- Lourdes Canale as Maria
- Alejandro Tamayo as Felipe
- Pablo Ferrel as Emilio
- Alberto Inzua as Antonio
- Maria Fernanda Ayensa as Alicia
- Esteban Siller as Salomon
- Magda Rodriguez as Malena
- Ismael Aguilar as Mario
- Myrrah Saavedra as Elizabeth
- Rebeca Rambal as Marcela
- Gilberto Gil as Miguel
- Gerardo Paz as Eduardo
- Patricia Renteria as Rosa
- Jose Luis Padilla as Ramon
- Eric del Castillo as Manuel
- Javier Marc as Maximiliano
- Enrique Barrera Merino es Ernesto
- Claudia Guzmán as Elisa
