= El despertar =

Mexican telenovela

- Genre: Telenovela
- Created by: Carlos Lozano Dana
- Directed by: José Morris
- Starring: María Rivas; Guillermo Murray
- Opening theme: "El despertar" by Marco Antonio Muñiz
- Country of origin: Mexico
- Original language: Spanish

Production
- Executive producer: Ernesto Alonso

Original release
- Network: Telesistema Mexicano
- Release: 1966

El despertar is a Mexican telenovela produced by Ernesto Alonso for Telesistema Mexicano in 1966.

== Cast ==
- María Rivas as Nora
- Guillermo Murray as Freddy
- Adriana Roel as Katia
- Hector Andremar as Horacio
- Fanny Schiller as Lola
- Prudencia Griffel as Doña Remedios
- Susana Freyre
- Chela Castro
- Enrique Rambal
- Carlos Fernández
