= Bárbara Gil =

Mexican actress (1930–2015)

- Occupation: Actress
- Years active: 1949–2004

Bárbara Gil was a Mexican film and television actress.

== Filmography ==
=== Films ===
- The Lady of the Veil (1949) - Lolita - Laura Camarena
- Quinto patio (1950) - Rosita
- De Tequila, su mezcal (1950)
- Tacos joven (1950)
- Tierra baja (1951) - Nuri
- La marquesa del barrio (1951) - María Cristina
- La tienda de la esquina (1951) - Rosaura
- Retorno al quinto patio (1951) - Rosa
- Salón de baile (1952) - Gloria
- The Right to Be Born (1952) - María Teresa
- El luchador fenómeno (1952) - Martha
- Marejada (1952) - Santuza
- Acuérdate de vivir (1953) - Esther
- Seven Women (1953)
- El vendedor de muñecas (1955)
- Ultraje al amor (1956) - Estela Soler
- Escuela de rateros (1958) - Alicia
- Ladrones de niños (1958) - Gloria
- To Each His Life (1960) - Raquel, la 'Penas'
- La sombra del Caudillo (1960) - Rosario
- Una pasión me domina (1961) - Elena
- Mi guitarra y mi caballo (1961)
- Bonitas las tapatías (1961)
- Jalisco Gals Are Beautiful (1961)
- El fusilamiento (1962)
- Our Hateful Husbands (1962)
- La tigresa (1973) - Mamá de Luis
- Las sobrinas del diablo (1983) - Doña Leonor
- El mexicano feo (1984)
- Los gatilleros del diablo (1985)
- La muerte llora de risa (1985)
- Golondrina presumida (1985)
- La Alacrana (1986) - Dora, hermana de Elliseo
- Sabor a mí (1988)
- Señoritas a disgusto (1989) - Luisa
- Esclavos de la pasión (1995)

=== Television ===
- Senda prohibida (1958)
- Un paso al abismo (1958)
- El precio del cielo (1959)
- No basta ser médico (1961)
- Un hijo cayó del cielo (1961)
- Marcela (1962)
- La doctora (1964)
- Central de emergencia (1964)
- María Isabel (1966) - Mireya Serrano
- Angustia del pasado (1967)
- El profesor particular (1971)
- Pobre Clara (1975) - Mary
- Mi hermana la nena (1976) - María
- Los años pasan (1985) - Ursula
- El medio pelo (1980) - Paz
- Pelusita (1980) - Rosa
- Infamia (1981)
- La pobre Señorita Limantour (1987)
- Rosa Salvaje (1987 - 1988, 9 episodes, as Amalia)
- Dos vidas (1988, as Doña Leonor)
- Simplemente María (1989) - Dulce Martinez
- Mujer, Casos de la Vida Real (1990-2004, 12 episodes) - Chayito / Juliana (final appearance)
- Yo no creo en los hombres (1991) - Laura Miranda
- La última esperanza (1993)
- Mujer bonita (2001, 10 episodes) - Mariana
- The Outsider (2001, 1 episode) - Sagrario Vargas

== Bibliography ==
- Pitts, Michael R. Western Movies: A Guide to 5,105 Feature Films. McFarland, 2012.
