= Vidas cruzadas (1963 TV series) =

- Genre: Telenovela
- Country of origin: Mexico
- Original language: Spanish

Original release
- Network: Telesistema Mexicano
- Release: 1963

Vidas cruzadas is a Mexican telenovela produced by Televisa for Telesistema Mexicano in 1963.

== Cast ==
- Carlos Ancira
- Carlos Andremar
- Anita Blanch
- Eva Calvo
- Josefina Escabedo
- Pepito Fernandez
- Raúl Meraz
- María Rivas
- Adriana Roel
- Guillermo Zetina
