= Rosario (1969 TV series) =

- Genre: Telenovela
- Directed by: Rafael Banquells
- Country of origin: Mexico
- Original language: Spanish

Original release
- Network: Telesistema Mexicano

Rosario, is a Mexican telenovela produced by Televisa and originally transmitted by Telesistema Mexicano.

== Cast ==
- Miguel Córcega
- María Rivas
- Lupita Lara
- Estela Chacón
