= Flor marchita =

- Directed by: Rogelio A. González
- Written by: Estela Calderón; Rogelio A. González; Ramón Obón
- Produced by: Ernesto Enríquez; César Santos Galindo
- Starring: Sara García; María Rivas; Ofelia Guilmáin; Guillermo Murray; Nora Larraga "Karla"; Jorge Lavat; Carlos Piñar; José Gálvez; Aldo Monti; David Estuardo
- Music by: Gustavo César Carrión
- Release date: 3 July 1969
- Running time: 105 minute
- Country: Mexico
- Language: Spanish

Flor marchita ("Wilted Flower") is a 1969 Mexican film. It stars Sara García.

== Cast ==
- María Rivas as Esther Almada
- Guillermo Murray as David Grajalez
- Sara García as Paula la nana
- Ofelia Guilmáin as Eugenia Almada
- José Gálvez as Javier Almada
- Carlos Piñar as Hugo Almada
- Nora Larraga Karla as Gena Almada
- Jorge Lavat as Bernardo Molina
- Aldo Monti as Renato Conti
- David Estuardo
- Manuel Garay
- Sergio Virel
- Armando Arriola
