= Casa de Vecindad (TV series) =

1964 Mexican telenovela

- Julissa in Casa de Vecindad
- Directed by: Ernesto Alonso
- Starring: Ofelia Guilmáin; Julissa; Jacqueline Andere
- Country of origin: Mexico
- Original language: Spanish

Production
- Producer: Ernesto Alonso

Casa de Vecindad (Spanish: [ˈkasa ðe βesindað]) ("Dwelling") is a 1964 comedic-drama Mexican telenovela. Each episode is of 30 minutes duration. The telenovela is often referred to as La Vecindad. There is a film called Casa de Vecindad.

The producer Julissa was the lead in the telenovela; other notable actors appeared in the series: Jacqueline Andere, Enrique Álvarez Félix and Ofelia Guilmáin. Andere and Félix later worked on the thriller La Casa del Pelícano.

== Cast ==
- Enrique Álvarez Félix
- Rafael del Río
- Emily Cranz
- Silvia Fournier
- Carlos Riquelme
- Jacqueline Andere
- Ofelia Guilmáin
- Julissa
- Miguel Manzano
- Carmen Salinas
