= El usurpador =

Mexican telenovela

- Genre: Telenovela
- Country of origin: Mexico
- Original language: Spanish

Original release
- Network: Telesistema Mexicano
- Release: 1967

El usurpador is a Mexican telenovela produced by Televisa for Telesistema Mexicano in 1967.

== Cast ==
- Jorge Lavat as Octavio "El usurpador"
- Magda Guzmán as María
- Raúl Dantés
- Magda Guzmán
- Noé Murayama
- Gloria Leticia Ortiz
- Raúl "Chato" Padilla
- Adriana Roel
