= Ofelia Guilmáin =

Spanish actress (1921–2005)

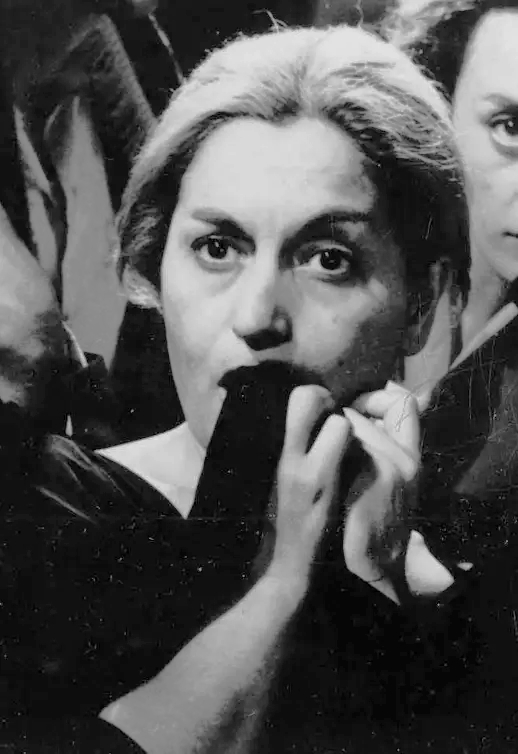
- Ofelia Guilmáin in El ángel exterminador (1962)
- Born: Ofelia Puerta Guilmáin; 17 November 1921; Madrid, Spain
- Died: 14 January 2005 (aged 83); Mexico City, Mexico
- Occupation: Actress
- Years active: 1940–2005

Ofelia Puerta Guilmáin (17 November 1921 – 14 January 2005) was a Spanish actress. She is also the mother of actors Juan Ferrara and Lucía Guilmáin. Two of her grandchildren, sons of Ferrara, Mauricio and Juan Carlos Bonet, are also actors.

== Life and career ==
Ofelia Guilmáin was born in Madrid, Spain.

She was part of the Guerrillas of Theater groups in Spain set up by the republican government. When Francisco Franco came to power, she left her country as did many other artists and intellectuals. She arrived with her family in Mexico in 1939 and debuted in theater the following year in the play Mujeres. In 1940, she made her first film El capitán estrella and married Lucilo Gutiérrez next year. She retired from show business for a decade and became a Mexican citizen in 1952.

She made approximately 41 telenovelas, 39 movies and 100 plays. Hugo Argüelles wrote La ronda de la hechizada specifically for her in 1968.

=== Death ===
Ofelia Guilmáin died in Mexico City at the age of 83 from respiratory failure caused by pneumonia.

== Plays ==
- Mientras me muero... pero de risa (2004)
- Los monólogos de la vagina ("The Vagina Monologues") (2002)
- The House of Bernarda Alba (2002)
- Los árboles mueren de pie (2000)
- Los reyes del mundo (1959)
- A ocho columnas
- Yocasta, o casi (1961)
- Compañeros
- Electra (by Sophocles) (1960)
- Medea (by Euripides) (1964)
- Las troyanas (1963)
- Los justos (1955)
- Miércoles de ceniza ("Ash Wednesday") (1956)
- El malentendido (1958)
- Juego de reinas (1962)
- Fuente Ovejuna (1963)
- María Tudor ("Mary Tudor") (1958)
- La maestra bebe un poco
- Bodas de sangre (1957)
- Un tal Judas (1955)
- La ronda de la hechizada (1968)
- La hidalga del valle (1954)
- La discreta enamorada (1954)
- Don Juan Tenorio (1953)
- Las mocedades del Cid (1953)
- La Celestina (1953)
- Isabel de Inglaterra ("Elizabeth of England") (1979)
- Debiera haber obispas
- Mujeres (1940)

== Films ==
- Mi verdad (2004) as Juan Osorio's mother
- El patrullero 777 (1977)
- Celestina (1976) as Celestina
- El esperado amor desesperado (1976)
- Aquellos años (1974)
- El profeta Mimí (1973)
- El primer amor (1972)
- El negocio del odio (1972)
- The Garden of Aunt Isabel (1971)
- Misión cumplida (1970)
- Para servir a usted (1970)
- Las vírgenes locas (1970)
- ¿Por qué nací mujer? (1970) as Carmela
- Confesiones de una adolescente (1970)
- La muñeca perversa (1969)
- Siempre hay una primera vez (1969) (segment "Gloria")
- Flor marchita (1969) as Eugenia Almada
- Sor Ye-Ye (1967)
- Pánico (1966)
- Sangre en Río Bravo (1966)
- El escapulario (1966) as Maria Perez viuda de Fernandez
- El jinete justiciero en retando a la muerte (1966)
- Aquella Rosita Alvírez (1965)
- Los espadachines de la reina (1963)
- El ángel exterminador (1962) as Juana Avila
- El barón del terror (1962) as Senora Luis Meneses
- Quinceañera (1960)
- El caso de una adolescente (1958)
- El hombre y el monstruo (1958) as Mother
- Nazarín (1958) as Chanfa
- Mi desconocida esposa (1958)
- Flor de fango (1942)
- El Capitán Centellas (1941)
- Caperucita y Pulgarcito contra los monstruos (1962)

== Telenovelas ==
- Amarte es mi pecado (2004) as Covadonga
- La otra (2002) as Sabina
- Siempre te amaré (2000) as Úrsula Castellanos
- Vivo por Elena (1998) as Luz
- El alma no tiene color (1997) as Alina
- Desencuentro (1997)
- La antorcha encendida (1996) as Doña Macaria de Soto
- Marisol (1996) as Zamira
- Agujetas de color de rosa (1994) as Bárbara
- Valentina (1993) as Dona Federica
- Milagro y magia (1991) as Rufina
- Días sin luna (1990) as Carlota Parlange
- Yesenia (1987) as Magneta
- Eclipse (1984) as Virginia
- Mañana es primavera (1982) as Doctora
- La divina Sarah (1980) as Sarah
- Marcha nupcial (1977) as Luisa
- Los bandidos del río frío (1976) as Calavera Catrina
- El manantial del milagro (1974) as Luz
- Mi primer amor (1973) as Doña Julia
- Sublime reducción (1971)
- La gata (1970) as Lorenza
- Yesenia (1970) as Trifenia
- Los caudillos (1968) as Felipa
- Lágrimas amargas (1967) as Carola Baida
- Obsesión (1967)
- El espejismo brillaba (1966)
- Las abuelas (1965)
- El refugio (1965)
- Casa de huéspedes (1965)
- Llamado urgente (1965)
- La vecindad (1964)
- Juicio de almas (1964)
- Doña Macabra (1963) as Demetria
- Encadenada (1962)
- Las momias de Guanajuato (1962)
- Divorciadas (1961)
- Espejo de sombras (1961)
- Caperucita y Pulgarcito contra los monstruos (1960)
- Cuidado con el ángel (1959, live)
- Cadenas de amor (1959, live)

== See also ==
- Foreign-born artists in Mexico
- List of Spaniards
- List of Mexicans
