= Penumbra (TV series) =

- Genre: Telenovela
- Country of origin: Mexico
- Original language: Spanish
- No. of seasons: 1
- No. of episodes: 30

Original release
- Network: Telesistema Mexicano
- Release: 1962

Penumbra is a Mexican telenovela produced by Televisa for Telesistema Mexicano in 1962.

== Cast ==
- Silvia Derbez
- Roberto Cañedo
- Azucena Rodríguez
- Antonio de Hud
- Carlos Navarro
- Maria Eugenia Ríos
- Rafael Bertrand
- Martha Patricia
