= La casa del odio =

Mexican telenovela

- Genre: Telenovela; Drama
- Starring: Rafael Banquells; Carmen Montejo; Tony Carbajal
- Country of origin: Mexico
- Original language: Spanish

Production
- Executive producer: Ernesto Alonso
- Production locations: Mexico City, Mexico
- Running time: 42-45 minutes
- Production company: Televisa

Original release
- Network: Canal 4, Telesistema Mexicano
- Release: July 4, 1960 – 1960

La casa del odio is a Mexican telenovela that aired on Canal 4, Telesistema Mexicano in 1960. It was produced by Ernesto Alonso and starred Carmen Montejo and Rafael Banquells.

== Cast ==
- Carmen Montejo
- Rafael Banquells
- Tony Carbajal
- Dalia Iñiguez
- Patricia Morán
- Rafael Llamas
- Eduardo Fajardo
