= Donde termina el camino =

Mexican telenovela

- Genre: Telenovela
- Directed by: Antulio Jiménez Pons
- Starring: Lupita Lara; Alfredo Leal
- Country of origin: Mexico
- Original language: Spanish

Original release
- Network: Canal de las Estrellas
- Release: 1978

Donde termina el camino is a Mexican telenovela directed by Antulio Jiménez Pons for Canal de las Estrellas in 1978.

== Cast ==
- Lupita Lara - Patricia Alconedo
- Alfredo Leal - Gerardo Alconedo
- Raphael - Manuel
- Maricruz Olivier - Margarita
- Eduardo Alcaraz - "El Bacanora"
- Lilia Aragón - María Teresa de Alconedo
- Miguel Maciá
- Gonzalo Vega - Gino Gutiérrez
- Fernando Sáenz - Rolando "El Gato"
- Nerina Ferrer - Dolores
- Carlos Ignacio - Armando
- Guillermo Zarur - Padre Juan Pablo
- Rafael Llamas
- Isabela Corona - Doña Lucía vda. de Alconedo
- Alicia Montoya
- Salvador Sánchez
- Sara Guash
- Carmen Cortés
- Margarita Hermann
- Armando Alcazar
- Ramón Menéndez - Roque
- Manuel Landeta
