= La razón de vivir =

Mexican telenovela

- Genre: Telenovela
- Created by: Marissa Garrido
- Directed by: Luis Aragón
- Starring: Carmen Montejo; Aldo Monti
- Country of origin: Mexico
- Original language: Spanish

Production
- Executive producer: Ernesto Alonso

Original release
- Network: Telesistema Mexicano
- Release: 1966

La razón de vivir (English: The reason for living) is a Mexican telenovela produced by Ernesto Alonso for Telesistema Mexicano in 1966.

== Cast ==
- Carmen Montejo
- Aldo Monti
- Daniel Riolobos
- Oscar Morelli
- Yolanda Ciani
- Carmen Salinas
