= Surviving My Quinceañera =

- Theatrical release poster
- Directed by: Chava Cartas
- Written by: Juan Carlos Garzón; Angélica Gudiño
- Produced by: Ruth Cherem Daniel; Paco Cossio; Francisco González Compeán
- Starring: Berenice Jonguitud
- Cinematography: Beto Casillas
- Edited by: Martha Poly Vil
- Production companies: Videocine; Draco Films
- Distributed by: Videocine
- Release date: September 21, 2023
- Running time: 101 minutes
- Country: Mexico
- Language: Spanish
- Box office: $3,4 million

Surviving My Quinceañera (Spanish: Sobreviviendo mis XV, lit. 'Surviving my XV') is a 2023 Mexican comedy film directed by Chava Cartas and written by Juan Carlos Garzón and Angélica Gudiño. It stars Berenice Jonguitud accompanied by Guillermo Villegas, Verónica Bravo, Lupita Lara, Paco Luna, Sofía Carrera, Juan Pablo Fuentes, Farah Justiniani and Hanssel Casillas. It premiered on September 21, 2023, in Mexican theaters.

== Synopsis ==
Danae is a young teenager who must deal with the problems of fitting in with her new schoolmates and, at the same time, cope with the family pressure to celebrate her fifteenth birthday in the most traditional way, with a fluffy dress, chamberlains and a waltz. at a big party, and somehow she has to balance the demands of her family with those of her new friends to have an 'aesthetic' party, but one that her grandmother also likes.

== Cast ==
The actors participating in this film are:

- Memo Villegas as Leopoldo
- Berenice Jonguitud as Danae
- Verónica Bravo as Mirna
- Lupita Lara as Evelia
- Gerardo Taracena as Melchor
- Gabriela Zamora as Renata
- Valeria Vera as Pat
- Luciana Vale as Rebeca
- Farah Justiniani as Marisol
- Mario Alberto Monroy as Héctor
- Paco Luna as Irving
- Juan Pablo Fuentes Acevedo as Enrique
- Nova Coronel as Dj Eclipse
- Nastassia Villasana as Ivonne
- Andrea Portal as Camila
- Hanssel Casillas as Román
- Patricio González Ortega as Álvaro
- Carolina Anzures as Isabela
- Déborah Ríos as Enrique's mom
- Guadalupe Damián as Coach
- Azucena Acevedo as Susy
- Efraín Berry as Padre
- Gabriela Aguirre as Aunt Beba
- Sofía Carrera as Alonza
- Catalina Ríos as Teacher
- Jafeth Chena as Ricardo
- Hugo Luna as Bartender
- José L. Fuchs as Farfán

== Reception ==
=== Box-office ===
In its first weekend, the film grossed $17.6 million Mexican pesos, ranking as the second highest-grossing film of the week, surpassed by The Nun II. Throughout its history, the film grossed $63.9 million Mexican pesos, becoming the fourth highest-grossing national film of 2023.

=== Accolades ===
Year	Award	Category	Recipient	Result	Ref.
2023	19th Canacine Awards	Best Director	Chava Cartas	Nominated	
2023	19th Canacine Awards	Best Actress	Verónica Bravo	Nominated	
2023	19th Canacine Awards	Best Actor	Guillermo Villegas	Nominated	
2023	19th Canacine Awards	Best Newcomer - Female	Berenice Jonguitud	Won	
2023	19th Canacine Awards	Best Promotional Campaign	Videocine	Nominated	
2024	49th Diosas de Plata	Best Newcomer - Female	Berenice Jonguitud	Nominated	
