= El vagabundo =

Mexican telenovela

- Genre: Telenovela; Romance; Drama
- Directed by: Sonia Furió
- Starring: Augusto Benedico; Silvia Derbez; Sonia Furió; Pilar Jordan; Gloria Jordán
- Country of origin: Mexico
- Original language: Spanish

Original release
- Network: Telesistema Mexicano
- Release: 1971 – 1971

Related
- Sublime redención; Velo de novia

El vagabundo (English title:The tramp) is a Mexican telenovela produced and directed by for Telesistema Mexicano.

== Cast ==
- Augusto Benedico
- Silvia Derbez
- Sonia Furió
- Pilar Jordan
- Gloria Jordán
- Enrique Lizalde
- Patricia de Morelos
- Claudio Obregón
