= Marianela (TV series) =

1961 Mexican telenovela

- Genre: Telenovela
- Based on: Marianela by Benito Pérez Galdós
- Directed by: Ernesto Alonso
- Starring: Magda Guzmán; Narciso Busquets
- Country of origin: Mexico
- Original language: Spanish

Original release
- Network: Telesistema Mexicano
- Release: 1961

Marianela is a Mexican telenovela directed by Ernesto Alonso for Telesistema Mexicano in 1961.

== Cast ==
- Magda Guzmán as Marianela
- Narciso Busquets as Pablo
- Sergio Jurado
- Aurora Molina
- Alicia Rodríguez
- Celia Manzano
- Eduardo Alcaraz
