= Amar fue su pecado =

- Genre: Telenovela; Drama
- Written by: Mimí Bechelani
- Starring: Beatriz Aguirre; Ramón Gay; Magda Guzmán
- Country of origin: Mexico
- Original language: Spanish

Production
- Executive producer: Rafael Banquells
- Running time: 42-45 minutes
- Production company: Televisa

Original release
- Network: Canal 4, Telesistema Mexicano
- Release: 1960 – 1960

Amar fue su pecado, is a Mexican telenovela that aired on Canal 4, Telesistema Mexicano in 1960. It was directed by Rafael Banquells, and starred Beatriz Aguirre.

== Cast ==
- Beatriz Aguirre
- Magda Guzmán
- Ramón Gay
- Javier Guerrero
- Consuelo Guerrero de Luna
- Graciela Doring
- Francisco Jambrina
- Enrique del Castillo
- Roberto Araya
- Milagros de Real
- Tere Mondragón

== Production ==
- Original Story: Mimi Bechelani
- Director: Rafael Banquells
- Manager cameras: Leopoldo Labra
