= Secretaria o mujer =

Mexican telenovela

- Genre: Telenovela; Drama
- Starring: Rafael Banquells
- Country of origin: Mexico
- Original language: Spanish
- No. of episodes: 48

Production
- Production locations: Mexico City, Mexico
- Running time: 42-45 minutes
- Production company: Televisa

Original release
- Network: Telesistema Mexicano
- Release: 1960 – 1960

Secretaria o mujer is a Mexican telenovela produced by Telesistema Mexicano (now Televisa) in 1960.

== Plot ==
The story of a man who falls in love with his secretary, but can not recognize.

== Cast ==
- Rafael Banquells
- Patricia Morán
- Tony Carbajal
- Dalia Íñiguez
