= Corazones sin rumbo (TV series) =

- Genre: Telenovela
- Created by: Fernanda Villeli
- Starring: Carlos Piñar; Blanca Guerra
- Country of origin: Mexico
- Original language: Spanish
- No. of episodes: 20

Production
- Executive producer: Irene Sabido
- Running time: 30 minutes

Original release
- Network: Canal de las Estrellas
- Release: 1980

Related
- La mesera (1963)

Corazones sin rumbo (English title: Hearts aimlessly) is a Mexican telenovela produced by Valentín Pimstein for Televisa in 1980.

Is an adaptation of the soap opera La mesera produced in 1963.

== Cast ==
- Carlos Piñar as Manuel
- Blanca Guerra as Magda
- Beatriz Aguirre as Lorenza
- Silvia Caos as Concha
- Carmelita González as Rocio
- Rebeca Manriquez as Leonor
- Rocio Chazaro as La Chata
- Manuel Saval as Jorge
- Víctor Alcocer as Esteban
- Lola Tinoco as Chole
- Humberto Cabañas as Taruffi
- José Flores as Pepe
- Raúl Ortiz as Paquito
- Eloisa Capilla as Chabela
- Florencio Castello as Don José
- Jesus Gómez as Angel
- Antonio Castro as Carlos
- Ernesto Casillas as Cura
- Roy de la Serna as Sr.Pittman
