= Fallaste corazón =

Mexican telenovela

- Genre: Telenovela
- Country of origin: Mexico
- Original language: Spanish

Original release
- Network: Telesistema Mexicano
- Release: 1968

Fallaste corazón is a Mexican telenovela produced by Televisa and originally transmitted by Telesistema Mexicano.

== Cast ==
- Sonia Furió
- Cuco Sánchez
- Andrea Palma
- Lupita Lara
