= Night of Miracles =

- Directed by: Renzo Russo
- Written by: Aquiles Nazoa
- Starring: Elena Fernan; Aldo Monti; Violeta Peñalver
- Music by: Eduardo Serrano
- Production companies: Bolívar Film; Elvi Films
- Distributed by: Bolívar Film
- Release date: 26 March 1954
- Country: Venezuela
- Language: Spanish

Night of Miracles (Spanish: Noche de milagros) is a 1954 Venezuelan drama film directed by Renzo Russo and starring Elena Fernan, Aldo Monti and Violeta Peñalver.

== Cast ==
- Elena Fernan
- Aldo Monti
- Violeta Peñalver
- Miro Anton
- Mario Chaves
- Xiomara Latos
- José Antonio Gutiérrez
- Francisco Bernalche
- Marcisa Mundett
- Hermelinda Alvarado
- Josefina Briseño
- Eloy Cisneros
- Juan Ramon Soler
- Dario Lauri

== Bibliography ==
- Darlene J. Sadlier. Latin American Melodrama: Passion, Pathos, and Entertainment. University of Illinois Press, 2009.
