= No basta ser médico =

Mexican telenovela

- Genre: Telenovela
- Directed by: Francisco Jambrina
- Country of origin: Mexico
- Original language: Spanish

Original release
- Network: Telesistema Mexicano
- Release: 1961

No basta ser médico (English: In simply being a doctor) is a Mexican telenovela produced by Televisa and broadcast by Telesistema Mexicano in 1961.

== Cast ==
- Francisco Jambrina
- Tony Carbajal
- Bárbara Gil
- Carlos Navarro
- Dolores Tinoco
- Alberto Galán
- Silvia Caos
- Elsa Gutierrez
- David Reynoso
