= Central de emergencia =

Mexican telenovela

- Genre: Telenovela
- Country of origin: Mexico
- Original language: Spanish

Original release
- Network: Telesistema Mexicano
- Release: 1964

Central de emergencia is a Mexican telenovela produced by Televisa for Telesistema Mexicano in 1964.

== Cast ==
- Ricardo Adalid
- Luis Aragón
- Antonio Bravo
- Tony Carbajal
- Jorge del Campo
- Silvia Derbez
- Gloria Estrada
- Bárbara Gil
- Héctor Gómez
- Francisco Jambrina
- Rafael LLamas
- Bertha Moreno
- María Eugenia Ríos
- Teresa Selma
- Dalia Íñiguez
