= Un hijo cayó del cielo =

Mexican telenovela

- Genre: Telenovela
- Starring: Miguel Córcega; Bárbara Gil
- Country of origin: Mexico
- Original language: Spanish

Original release
- Network: Telesistema Mexicano
- Release: 1962

Un hijo cayó del cielo (English: A child fell out of the sky) is a Mexican telenovela produced by Televisa and broadcast by Telesistema Mexicano in 1962.

== Cast ==
- Miguel Córcega
- Ángel Garasa
- Bárbara Gil
- Héctor Suárez
