= Valeria (1966 TV series) =

- Genre: Telenovela
- Directed by: Julio Alejandro
- Starring: Rosenda Monteros; Aldo Monti
- Country of origin: Mexico
- Original language: Spanish

Production
- Executive producer: Ernesto Alonso

Original release
- Network: Telesistema Mexicano
- Release: 1966

Related
- Valeria (1986); Valeria

Valeria (Valería) is a Mexican telenovela produced by Ernesto Alonso for Telesistema Mexicano in 1966. It was directed by Julio Alejandro.

An Argentinian remake of Valería was made in 1986. A Peruvian telenovela Milagros is quite similar to Valería.

== Plot ==
In this telenovela is shown the First Holy Communion of the main character Valería. On the day of her First Communion, Valería witnessed the murder of her father and rape of her mother.

== Cast ==
- Rosenda Monteros as Valeria
- Aldo Monti
- Enrique Álvarez Félix
