= María Isabel (1966 TV series) =

- Genre: Telenovela
- Created by: Yolanda Vargas Dulche
- Directed by: Jesús Valero
- Starring: Silvia Derbez; Raúl Ramírez
- Country of origin: Mexico
- Original language: Spanish

Production
- Executive producer: Valentín Pimstein
- Cinematography: Antulio Jimenez Pons

Original release
- Network: Telesistema Mexicano
- Release: 1966

Related
- María Isabel, si tú supieras (1997)

María Isabel is a Mexican telenovela produced by Valentín Pimstein for Telesistema Mexicano in 1966.

== Cast ==
- Silvia Pinal as María Isabel
- Raúl Ramírez as Ricardo
- Ada Carrasco
- José Carlos Ruiz as Pedro
- Irma Lozano as Rosa Isela
- Eduardo McGregor as Rogelio
- Andrea Cotto as Gloria
- Bárbara Gil as Mireya
- Oscar Morelli as Leobardo
- Fernando Mendoza as Felix
- Vicky Aguirre
- Aurora Cortes
- Elisabeth Dupeyrón
