= Codicia =

Mexican telenovela

- Genre: Telenovela; Romance; Drama
- Directed by: Julio Alejandro
- Starring: Lilia Prado; Héctor Gómez; Rafael Banquells; Bertha Moss
- Country of origin: Mexico
- Original language: Spanish
- No. of episodes: 60

Production
- Running time: 30 minutes

Original release
- Network: Telesistema Mexicano
- Release: 1962 – 1962

Related
- La cobarde; Encadenada

Codicia (English title: Greed) is a Mexican telenovela produced by Televisa and transmitted by Telesistema Mexicano.

== Cast ==
- Lilia Prado
- Héctor Gómez
- Rafael Banquells
- Bertha Moss
- Ramón Bugarini
- Xavier Loyá
- Gloria Garcia
- Guillermo Zetina
- Luis Aragón
- Julián García
- Aurora Cortés
- Lulú Parga
- Patricia de Morelos
- Alma Delia Fuentes
