= Lupita Lara =

Mexican actress (born 1950)

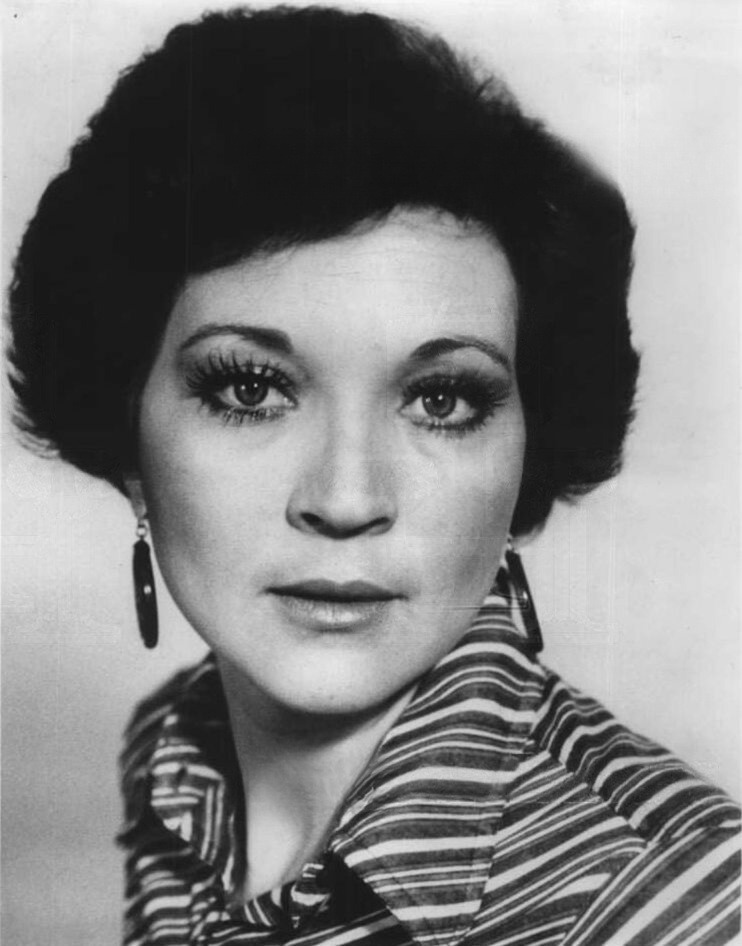
- Lara in 1979
- Born: Guadalupe Lara Ochoa; December 6, 1950 (age 75); Ciudad de Mexico, Mexico
- Occupation: Actress
- Years active: 1955-present

Lupita Lara (born December 6, 1950) is a Mexican actress.

== Early life ==
On 6 December 1950, Lara was born as Guadalupe Lara Ochoa in Mexico City, Mexico.

== Career ==
Lara began her career as a child actress at an early age. At age five, Lara made her debut in the children's play La Jota. At that time she also made her television debut, participating in the programs Bombonsico, Biberolandia and Yo fui testigo. In soap operas she made her debut in 1963 in El secreto, together with Magda Guzmán and José Gálvez. One of her most famous and remembered characters has been Lupita, the sympathetic and dreamy protagonist of Mi secretaria, the successful comedy starring also Pompín Iglesias, César Bono, Zoila Quiñones and Judy Ponte in 1978. The series was so successful that it extended to 1986.

She still works in soap operas, having given outstanding performances in Cruz de amor, Barata de primavera, La fiera, Amor de nadie, De frente al sol, Carita de ángel, El noveno mandamiento, and La otra y Amar sin límites, among many others.

== Filmography ==
=== Telenovelas ===
- Los ricos también lloran (2022) Nana Trini
- Muy padres (2017) .... Miriam Palacios Fernández
- Mujeres de negro (2016) .... Tania Zaldívar
- Mi corazón es tuyo (2015) .... Rubí
- La gata (2014) .... Eugenia Castañeda vda. de Elizalde
- Por siempre mi amor (2013/14) .... Gisela
- Un refugio para el amor (2012) .... Chuy
- Amorcito corazón (2011-2012)
- Amar sin límites (2006) .... Madre María
- Mundo de fieras (2006) .... Simona
- Alborada (2005) .... Rosario
- Mujer de madera (2004) .... Lucía Ruiz
- Bajo la misma piel (2003) .... Rebeca de Barraza
- ¡Vivan los niños! (2002-2003) .... Cayetana Rubio
- La otra (2002) .... Matilde Portugal
- El noveno mandamiento (2001) .... Elena Villanueva
- Carita de ángel (2000-2001) .... Magdalena
- Soñadoras (1998-1999) .... Viviana
- La paloma (1995) .... Toña
- Más allá del puente (1993-1994) .... Úrsula
- De frente al sol (1992) .... Úrsula
- Amor de nadie (1990) .... Amalia
- La fiera (1983) .... Elena Martínez Bustamante #1
- Al salir el sol (1980) .... Beatriz
- Donde termina el camino (1978)
- Rina (1977) .... Margarita
- Los bandidos de Río Frío (1976) .... Amparo
- Barata de primavera (1975) .... Gabriela Cortés
- Mi rival (1973)... Elenita
- Los que ayudan a Dios (1973) .... Millie
- Nosotros los pobres (1973)
- Cristo negro (1970) .... Carmen
- El mariachi (1970)
- Cadenas de angustia (1969)
- Rosario (1969)
- Una plegaria en el camino (1969)
- Cruz de amor (1968) .... Marisol Aguirre/Claudia
- Fallaste corazón (1968) .... Leticia
- Juventud divino tesoro (1968)
- Amor sublime (1967)
- Obsesión (1967)
- Rocámbole (1967)
- El cuarto mandamiento (1967)
- No quiero lágrimas (1967)
- Marina Lavalle (1965)
- El secreto (1963)

=== TV series ===
- Hermanos y detectives (2009) .... Esther
- La rosa de Guadalupe (2008) .... Adela (episode "Tacos de canasta")
- Mujer, casos de la vida real (1997 - 2006)
- Tu historia de amor (2003) .... Chole
- ¿Qué nos pasa? (1998)
- Al salir el sol (1980)
- Mi secretaria (1978 - 1986) .... Lupita
- Yo fui testigo
- Biberolandia
- Bombonsico

=== Movies ===
- Surviving My Quinceañera (2023) as Evelia
- Infamia (1991)
- Oficio de tinieblas (1981)
- La mafia amarilla (1975)
- Canción de Navidad (1974) as Estela
- Morirás con el sol (motociclistas suicidas) (1973) as Mili
- El quelite (1970) as Sister of Lucha
