= Cristo negro =

Mexican telenovela

- Genre: Telenovela
- Created by: Kenya Perea
- Directed by: Tony Carbajal
- Starring: Enrique Lizalde; Lupita Lara
- Country of origin: Mexico
- Original language: Spanish

Production
- Cinematography: Octavio Gómez

Original release
- Network: Televisión Independiente de México
- Release: 1971 – 1971

Cristo negro is a Mexican telenovela directed by Tony Carbajal for Televisión Independiente de México in 1971.

== Cast ==
- Enrique Lizalde
- Jorge Lavat
- Lupita Lara
- Carmen Salas
- Noé Murayama
- Eusebia Cosme
- Andrea Cotto
- Alejandra Meyer
- Rosángela Balbó
- Sergio Zuani
- Octavio Gómez
