= List of Televisa telenovelas (2000s) =

The following is a list of telenovelas produced by Televisa in the 2000s.

La fea más bella, starring Angélica Vale and Jaime Camil, the second Mexican version of the popular Colombian telenovela Betty la fea.

== 2000 ==
| Title | Author | Director | Ref. |
|---|---|---|---|
| Amigos x siempre | Palmira Olguín, Martha Olaíz, & Irma Ramos | Gilberto Macin | |
| Siempre te amaré | Caridad Bravo Adams | Patricia Reyes Spíndola | |
| Ramona | Helen Hunt Jackson | Alberto Cortés, Nicolás Echevarría, & Felipe Nájera | |
| La casa en la playa | Enrique Gómez Vadillo | Enrique Gómez Vadillo | |
| Locura de amor | Jorge Patiño | Alejandro Gamboa & Adriana Barraza | |
| Carita de ángel | Kary Fajer | Lili Garza, Marta Luna, & Juan Carlos Muñoz | |
| Mi Destino Eres Tú | Carmen Daniels & Jorge Lozano Soriano | Miguel Córcega and Mónica Miguel | |
| Abrázame muy fuerte | Liliana Abud | Miguel Córcega | |
| El precio de tu amor | Orlando Merino & Jaime García Estrada | Claudio Reyes Rubio | |
| Primer amor, a mil por hora | María Cervantes Balmori & Issa López | Luis Pardo, Eloy Ganuza & Martín Álvarez | |
| Por un beso | Gabriela Ortigoza, Juan Carlos Tejeda, Carmen Sepúlveda, & Juan Carlos Alcalá | Alfredo Gurrola, Benjamín Pineda, & Gustavo Rojo | |
| Rayito de luz | Socorro González | Alejandro Aragón, Gustavo Loza, & Martín Pérez Islas | |

== 2001 ==
| Title | Author | Director | Ref. |
|---|---|---|---|
| El noveno mandamiento | René Allouis | Lucero Suárez | |
| El derecho de nacer | Fernanda Villeli | Rafael Urióstegui | |
| Amigas y rivales | Alejandro Pohlenz | Emilio Larrosa | |
| Aventuras en el tiempo | Salvador Sánchez | Rosy Ocampo | |
| Mujer bonita | Inés Rodena | Karina Duprez | |
| La intrusa | Inés Rodena | Beatriz Sheridan | |
| Sin pecado concebido | Carlos Olmos | Miguel Córcega | |
| Atrévete a olvidarme | Martha Carrillo | Roberto Hernández Vázquez | |
| María Belén | Julio Porter | Arturo García Tenorio | |
| El Manantial | María del Carmen Peña | Carla Estrada | |
| Salomé | Sergio Jiménez | Juan Osorio | |
| El juego de la vida | Katia Estrada | Roberto Gómez Fernández | |
| Navidad sin fin | Alba García | Eugenio Cobo | |

== 2002 ==
| Title | Author | Director | Ref. |
|---|---|---|---|
| Cómplices al rescate | Rosy Ocampo | Rosy Ocampo | |
| Entre el amor y el odio | Liliana Abud | Miguel Córcega | |
| La Otra | Liliana Abud | Benjamín Cann | |
| Clase 406 | Pedro Damián | Juan Carlos Muñoz | |
| ¡Vivan los niños! | Abel Santacruz | Nicandro Díaz González | |
| Las vías del amor | Alejandro Pohlenz | Emilio Larrosa | |
| Así son ellas | Carlos Mercado Orduña | Raúl Araiza | |

== 2003 ==
| Title | Author | Director | Ref. |
|---|---|---|---|
| Niña amada mía | César Miguel Rondón | Angelli Nesma Medina | |
| De pocas, pocas pulgas | Mapat de Zatarain | Arturo García Tenorio | |
| Amor real | Caridad Bravo Adams | Carla Estrada | |
| Velo de novia | Janete Clair | Juan Osorio | |
| Alegrijes y Rebujos | Rosy Ocampo | Salvador Sánchez | |
| Bajo la misma piel | Julián Pastor | Carlos Moreno Laguillo | |
| Mariana de la noche | Salvador Mejía Alejandre | Miguel Córcega | |
| Clap, el lugar de tus sueños | Socorro González | Roberto Gómez Fernández | |

== 2004 ==
| Title | Author | Director | Ref. |
|---|---|---|---|
| Amarte es mi Pecado | Liliana Abud | Benjamín Cann | |
| Amy, la niña de la mochila azul | Rubén Galindo Aguilar | Roberto Sosa | |
| Corazones al límite | Nicandro Díaz González | Claudio Reyes Rubio | |
| Mujer de madera | Alejandro Pohlenz | Emilio Larrosa | |
| Rubí | Yolanda Vargas Dulché | Benjamín Cann | |
| Amar otra vez | Claudia Elisa Aguilar | Lucero Suárez | |
| Misión S.O.S | Salvador Sánchez | Rosy Ocampo | |
| Rebelde | Cris Morena | Pedro Damián | |
| Apuesta por un amor | Bernardo Romero Pereiro | Benjamín Cann | |
| Inocente de ti | Inés Rodena | Salvador Mejía Alejandre | |

== 2005 ==
| Title | Author | Director | Ref. |
|---|---|---|---|
| Sueños y caramelos | Abel Santacruz | Carlos Moreno Laguillo | |
| La madrastra | Liliana Abud | Miguel Córcega | |
| Contra viento y marea | Marta Luna | Nicandro Díaz González | |
| Piel de otoño | Liliana Abud | Mapat de Zatarain | |
| La esposa virgen | Caridad Bravo Adams | Salvador Mejía Alejandre | |
| Pablo y Andrea | Lorena Salazar | Lucero Suárez | |
| El Amor no Tiene Precio | Inés Rodena | Salvador Mejía Alejandre | |
| Barrera de amor | Liliana Abud | Raúl Araiza | |
| Alborada | María Zarattini | Carla Estrada | |
| Peregrina | Delia Fiallo | Miguel Córcega | |

== 2006 ==
| Title | Author | Director | Ref. |
|---|---|---|---|
| La fea más bella | Fernando Gaitán | Rosy Ocampo | |
| La verdad oculta | José Rendón | Emilio Larrosa | |
| Heridas de amor | Nora Alemán | Roberto Hernández | |
| Duelo de pasiones | José Rendón | Miguel Córcega | |
| Código Postal | José Alberto Castro | Benjamín Cann | |
| Mundo de fieras | Liliana Abud | Salvador Mejía Alejandre | |
| Amor Mío | Cris Morena | Roberto Gómez Fernández | |
| Las dos caras de Ana | Edwin Valencia | Lucero Suárez | |
| Amar sin límites | Arturo García Tenorio | Angelli Nesma Medina | |

== 2007 ==
| Title | Author | Director | Ref. |
|---|---|---|---|
| Destilando Amor | Victor Rodríguez | Nicandro Díaz González | |
| Yo amo a Juan Querendón | Gabriela Ortigoza | Mapat de Zatarain | |
| Lola, érase una vez | Cris Morena | Juan Carlos Muñoz | |
| Bajo las riendas del amor | Delia Fiallo | Ignacio Sada Madero | |
| Muchachitas como tú | Alejandro Pohlenz | Emilio Larrosa | |
| Pasión | María Zarattini | Carla Estrada | |
| Amor sin maquillaje | Salvador Garcini | Rosy Ocampo | |
| Al diablo con los guapos | Enrique Torres | Angelli Nesma Medina | |
| Palabra de mujer | Nené Cascallar | Benjamín Cann | |
| Tormenta en el paraíso | Cris Morena | Juan Osorio | |

== 2008 ==
| Title | Author | Director | Ref. |
|---|---|---|---|
| Fuego en la sangre | Liliana Abud | Miguel Córcega | |
| Las tontas no van al cielo | Rosy Ocampo | Felipe Nájera | |
| Querida enemiga | Claudia Aguilar | Lucero Suárez | |
| Cuidado con el ángel | Delia Fiallo | Nathalie Lartilleux | |
| Juro que te amo | Liliana Abud | Mapat de Zatarain | |
| Un gancho al corazón | Adrián Suar | Alejandro Gamboa | |
| En nombre del amor | María del Carmen Peña | Carlos Moreno Laguillo | |
| Mañana es para siempre | Mauricio Navas | Nicandro Díaz González | |

== 2009 ==
| Title | Author | Director | Ref. |
|---|---|---|---|
| Verano de amor | Patricia Maldonado | Luis Pardo | |
| Atrévete a soñar | Juan Rulfo | Luis de Llano Macedo | |
| Sortilegio | María Zarattini | Carla Estrada | |
| Mi pecado | Cuathémoc Blanco | Juan Osorio | |
| Hasta que el dinero nos separe | Fernando Gaitán | Emilio Larrosa | |
| Camaleones | Rosy Ocampo | Felipe Nájera | |
| Corazón salvaje | Caridad Bravo Adams | Salvador Mejía Alejandre | |
| Mar de amor | Delia Fiallo | Nathalie Lartilleux | |
