= Angustia del pasado =

Mexican telenovela

- Genre: Telenovela
- Country of origin: Mexico
- Original language: Spanish

Original release
- Network: Telesistema Mexicano
- Release: 1967

Angustia del pasado, is a Mexican telenovela produced by Televisa and originally transmitted by Telesistema Mexicano.

== Cast ==
- María Elena Marqués
- Augusto Benedico
- Raúl Ramírez
- Bárbara Gil
- Queta Lavat
