= Janina (TV series) =

- Genre: Telenovela
- Country of origin: Mexico
- Original language: Spanish

Original release
- Network: Telesistema Mexicano
- Release: 1962

Janina is a Mexican telenovela produced by Televisa for Telesistema Mexicano in 1962.

== Cast ==
- María Rivas ... Janina
- Aldo Monti ... Rodolfo
- Anita Blanch
- Augusto Benedico
- Guillermo Aguilar
- Andrea Palma
- José Gálvez
- Jacqueline Andere ... Gladys
- Chela Nájera
- Zoila Quiñones
- Guillermo Ríos
- Carlos Rotzinger
