= Guadalupe (film) =

- Release date: December 1, 2006
- Running time: 90 minutes
- Countries: Mexico; Spain
- Language: Spanish

Guadalupe is a 2006 film.

== Cast ==
- José Carlos Ruiz as Juan Diego
- Pedro Armendáriz Jr. as Simon

== Box office ==
In the US it made 848,139 dollars.
