= To Each His Life =

1960 film

- Directed by: Julio Bracho
- Written by: Luis G. Basurto (play); Julio Bracho
- Produced by: Ismael Rodríguez
- Starring: Ana Luisa Peluffo; Kitty de Hoyos; Bárbara Gil
- Cinematography: Jack Draper
- Edited by: Jorge Busto
- Music by: Raúl Lavista
- Production company: Películas Rodríguez
- Release date: 3 March 1960
- Running time: 95 minutes
- Country: Mexico
- Language: Spanish

To Each His Life (Spanish: Cada quién su vida) is a 1960 Mexican drama and romance film directed by Julio Bracho and starring Ana Luisa Peluffo, Kitty de Hoyos and Bárbara Gil. The film's sets were designed by the art director Salvador Lozano Mena.

== Synopsis ==
A collection of prostitutes and others disappointed in life gather in a Mexico City cabaret to celebrate New Year's Eve.

== Cast ==
- Ana Luisa Peluffo as Rosa, la 'Tacón Dorado'
- Emma Fink as María de la Soledad Ordóñez viuda de Moncada, La 'Siempreviva'
- Carlos Navarro as Bridge
- Bárbara Gil as Raquel, la 'Penas'
- Noé Murayama as El 'Ojitos'
- Luz María Núñez as La 'Jarocha'
- Fernando Mendoza as Diputado
- Héctor López Portillo as Profesor
- Alicia Gutiérrez as La 'Pepsi-Cola'
- Enrique Díaz 'Indiano' as Don Pepe
- Bruno Márquez as Juan, el Gordo
- Héctor Gómez as Bobby
- Elodia Hernández as Doña Concha
- José Raúl Mena as Borracho
- Joaquín Roche hijo as Chucho
- Linda Porto as Lilia Hernández
- Carmen Sagredo
- Edmundo Saracho
- Raúl Santamaría
- Salvador Aponte
- Eduardo Uthof
- Pedro Mardones
- Kitty de Hoyos as Dorita
- Armando Acosta as Cliente cabaret
- Magdalena Estrada as Mujer en cabaret
- Leonor Gómez as Lavapisos
- Kahlúa as Bailarina
- Rubén Márquez as Cliente cabaret

== Bibliography ==
- Goble, Alan. The Complete Index to Literary Sources in Film. Walter de Gruyter, 1999.
