= El corrido de Lupe Reyes =

Mexican telenovela

- Genre: Telenovela
- Country of origin: Mexico
- Original language: Spanish

Original release
- Network: Telesistema Mexicano
- Release: 1966

El corrido de Lupe Reyes is a Mexican telenovela produced by Televisa for Telesistema Mexicano in 1966.

== Cast ==
- David Reynoso
- Magda Guzmán
- Guillermo Zetina
- Alicia Gutiérrez
