= Bajo la sombra de los almendros =

Mexican telenovela

- Genre: Telenovela; Drama
- Created by: Kenia Perea
- Country of origin: Mexico
- Original language: Spanish

Original release
- Network: Telesistema Mexicano
- Release: 1961

Bajo la sombra de los almendros (English: Under the shade of almond trees) is a Mexican telenovela produced by Televisa and transmitted by Telesistema Mexicano.

== Cast ==
- Silvia Derbez
- Guillermo Orea
- José Baviera
- Nora Veryán
