= Marina (1974 TV series) =

- Genre: Telenovela
- Directed by: Jesús Valero
- Starring: Silvia Derbez; Carlos Bracho
- Country of origin: Mexico
- Original language: Spanish

Original release
- Network: Canal de las Estrellas
- Release: 1974

Mariana is a Mexican telenovela directed by Jesús Valero for Televisa in 1974. It starred Silvia Derbez and Carlos Bracho as the main characters.

== Cast ==
- Silvia Derbez as Marina
- Carlos Bracho
- Julieta Bracho
- Estela Chacón
- Aurora Alvarado
- Raúl Meraz
- Jorge del Campo
- Otto Sirgo
- Claudio Obregón
