= El secreto =

Mexican telenovela

- Genre: Telenovela
- Country of origin: Mexico
- Original language: Spanish

Original release
- Network: Telesistema Mexicano
- Release: 1963

El secreto is a Mexican telenovela produced by Televisa for Telesistema Mexicano in 1963.

== Cast ==
- Magda Guzmán
- José Gálvez
- Aurora Cortés
- Rosita Aragon
- Lilia Juárez
- Martha Verduzco
- Emilia Carranza
- Lupita Lara
- María Gentil Arcos
- José Cha´vez
- Roberto Araya
- Victoria Eugenia
