= La cobarde =

Mexican telenovela

- Genre: Telenovela; Drama
- Directed by: Ernesto Alonso; José Morris
- Starring: María Rivas; Julio Alemán; Prudencia Grifell; Anita Blanch
- Country of origin: Mexico
- Original language: Spanish
- No. of episodes: 59

Production
- Executive producer: Ernesto Alonso
- Running time: 30 minutes

Original release
- Network: Telesistema Mexicano
- Release: 1962 – 1962

Related
- El caminante; Codicia

La cobarde (English title:The craven) is a Mexican telenovela produced by Televisa and transmitted by Telesistema Mexicano.

== Cast ==
- María Rivas
- Julio Alemán
- Prudencia Grifell
- Anita Blanch
- Virginia Manzano
- Ramón Bugarini
- Jorge del Campo
- Ernesto Alonso
