= Angelitos negros (TV series) =

- Genre: Telenovela
- Directed by: Antulio Jiménez Pons
- Starring: Silvia Derbez; Alicia Rodríguez
- Country of origin: Mexico
- Original language: Spanish

Production
- Executive producer: Valentín Pimstein

Original release
- Network: Teleprogramas Acapulco, SA
- Release: 1970

Angelitos negros (English title:Black Angels) is a Mexican telenovela produced by Valentín Pimstein for Teleprogramas Acapulco, SA in 1970.

== Cast ==
- Silvia Derbez as Nana Mercé
- Alicia Rodríguez as Ana Luisa de la Fuente
- Manuel López Ochoa as Juan Carlos Flores
- Titina Romay as Isabel
- Antonio Raxel as Don Luis de la Fuente
- Josefina Escobedo as Carlota / Elisa
- Lilia Aragón as Jova
- Juanita Hernández Mejía as Belén Flores de la Fuente
- Malú Reyes as Malú
- Armando Velasco as Padre Padilla
- Miguel Macía as Sr. Sánchez
- Fernando Mendoza as Lic. Peláez
- Raúl "Chato" Padilla as Don Romualdo
- Rafael del Río as Toño
- Norma Jiménez Pons as María Flora
- Gerardo del Castillo as Don Laureano
