= El dolor de amar =

Mexican telenovela

- Genre: Telenovela
- Created by: Fernanda Villeli
- Directed by: Jesús Valero
- Country of origin: Mexico
- Original language: Spanish

Original release
- Network: Telesistema Mexicano
- Release: 1966

Related
- Senda prohibida (1958)

El dolor de amar is a Mexican telenovela directed by Jesús Valero for Telesistema Mexicano in 1966. Is a remake of telenovela Senda prohibida (1958).

== Cast ==
- Elvira Quintana as Olga
- Patricia Morán
- Augusto Benedico
- Aurora Alvarado as Clemen
- Mercedes Pascual
- Alejandro Ciangherotti
- Andrea Cotto
- Enrique García Álvarez
- Amparo Villegas
- Emilio Brillas
- Kika Meyer
