= Eva Calvo (actress) =

Mexican actress

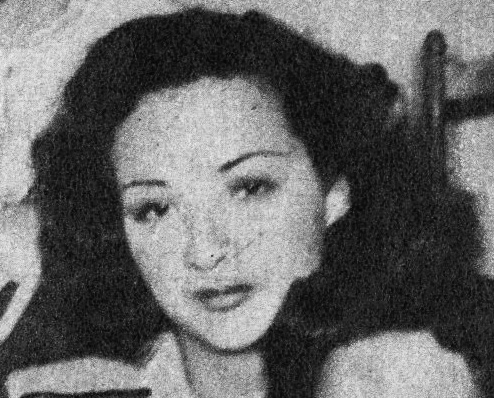
Eva Calvo in 1951

Eva Calvo (29 November 1921 – 7 December 2001) was a Mexican actress. She appeared in more than forty films from 1944 to 2001.

== Selected filmography ==
Film
Year	Title	Role	Notes
1944	El amor de los amores		
1945	Una gitana en México		
1948	The Flesh Commands		
1949	Autumn and Spring		
1951	Manos de seda		
1952	Las locuras de Tin-Tan		
1952	A Woman Without Love		
1955	A Life in the Balance		
1955	The Criminal Life of Archibaldo de la Cruz		
1955	To the Four Winds		
1963	Autumn Days		
1978	El patrullero 777		

TV
Year	Title	Role	Notes
1961	Vida robada		
1963	Vidas cruzadas		
1964	Apasionada		
1965	Marina Lavalle		
1967	Dicha robada		
1968	En busca del paraiso		
1969	El diario de una señorita decente		
1972	Hermanos Coraje		
1974	Mundo de juguete		
1988	El pecado de Oyuki		
1989	Simplemente María		
1990	Papá soltero		
1990	En carne propia		
1991	Muchachitas		
1992	María Mercedes		
1994	Volver a empezar		
1995	María la del barrio		
1996	Luz Clarita		
1999	Rosalinda		
2000	Mujeres engañadas		
2001	Carita de ángel		
2001	Mujer casos de la vida real		
