= El ídolo (TV series) =

Mexican telenovela

- Genre: Telenovela
- Created by: Mimí Bechelani
- Directed by: Francisco Jambrina
- Starring: Sonia Furió; Aldo Monti
- Country of origin: Mexico
- Original language: Spanish

Production
- Executive producer: Valentín Pimstein
- Cinematography: Antonio Fernández

Original release
- Network: Telesistema Mexicano
- Release: 1966

El ídolo is a Mexican telenovela produced by Valentín Pimstein for Telesistema Mexicano in 1966.

== Cast ==
- Sonia Furió
- Luz María Aguilar
- Aurora Molina
- Alicia Rodríguez
- Aldo Monti
- Antonio Medellín
- Socorro Avelar
- Carlos Ancira
- Mario Lara
- Magda Haller
