= El derecho de los hijos =

Mexican telenovela

- Genre: Telenovela
- Created by: Guillermo S.Casaseca; María Luz Perea
- Starring: Guillermo Murray; Silvia Derbez
- Country of origin: Mexico
- Original language: Spanish

Production
- Executive producer: Ernesto Alonso

Original release
- Network: Televisión Independiente de México
- Release: 1971

Related
- O Direito Dos Filhos (1968)

El derecho de los hijos is a Mexican telenovela produced by Ernesto Alonso for Televisión Independiente de México in 1971.

== Cast ==
- Guillermo Murray
- Silvia Derbez
- Nadia Milton
- Xavier Marc
- María Eugenia San Martín
- Alejandro Ciangherotti
- Martha Patricia
- J.A. Monsel
