= José Carlos Ruiz =

Mexican actor

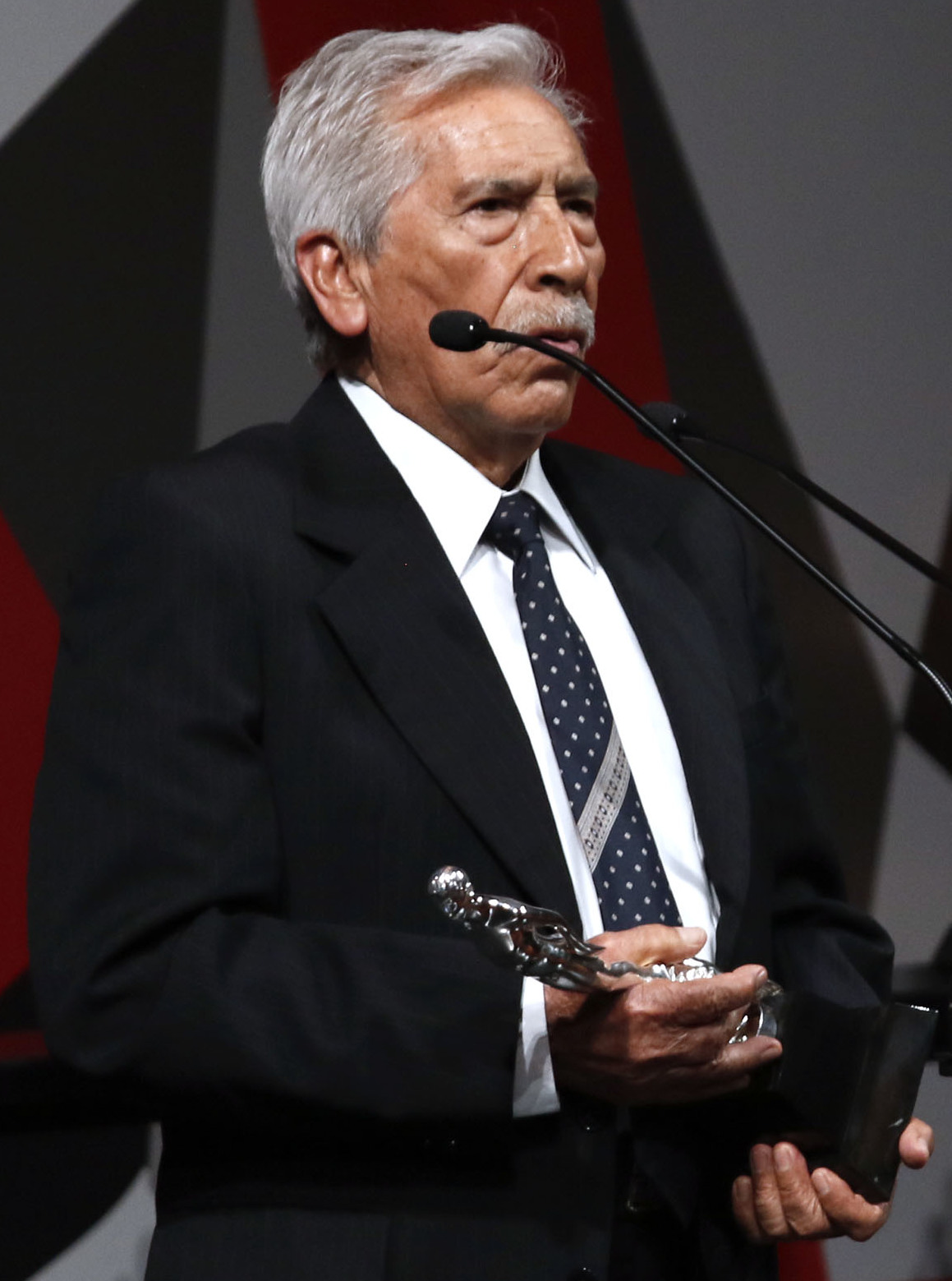
- Ruiz in 2017
- Born: José Carlos Ruiz; 17 November 1934 (age 92); Jerez, Zacatecas, Mexico
- Occupation: Actor
- Years active: 1965–present
- Spouse: Ada Marina

José Carlos Ruiz (born 17 November 1934) is a Mexican film and television actor. He starred in telenovelas such as María Isabel, Soñadoras, Mariana de la noche, Sortilegio, Soy tu dueña, Un refugio para el amor, Amor bravío and Corazón indomable.

== Biography ==
José Ruiz comes from humble origins and was once a hired hand for the company Luz y Fuerza. He worked as an assistant coffee mill worker, a butcher, and also an interior decorator, until he began his acting studies at Mexico's Institute of Fine Arts.

== Selected filmography ==
- Warehoused (2015)
- One for the Road (2014)
- Suave patria (2011): Jerónimo Natage
- Más allá del muro (2011):
- El estudiante (2009): Don Pedro.
- Cabeza de Buda (2009): Invitado 2
- Arráncame la vida (2008): Soriano
- Guadalupe (film) (2006): San Juan Diego
- Curandero (film) (2005): Don Carlos
- Los muertos que nos dieron la vida (2003)
- mariana de la noche (2003)
- Viaje aterrador (2002):
- Aunque tú no lo sepas (2000): Alumno 1
- Soñadoras (1998): Don Eugenio de la Peña
- Dos crímenes (1995): Ramón
- La tumba del Atlántico (1992):
- ¿Nos traicionará el presidente? (1991):
- Salvador (1986): Archbishop Óscar Romero
- Toña machetes (1985):
- Wandering Lives (1985): Francisco
- Bajo la metralla (1983)
- Guerilla from the North (1983)
- Who'll Stop the Rain (1978)
- El elegido (1977): Judas
- The Heist (1976)
- The Bricklayers (1976): Jacinto Martínez
- The House in the South (1975): Tomás
- El valle de los miserables (1975):
- Simón Blanco (1975): Lic. Caldoso
- Los perros de Dios (1974):
- La muerte de Pancho Villa (1974):
- Buck and the Preacher (1972): Brave
- Los marcados (1971): el Manco
- Zapata (1970):
- El escapulario (1968): Ruiz, soldier
- Black Wind (1965):
- Major Dundee (1965): Riago, a "Christian Indian" scout of the Americans pursuing the Apaches.

== Telenovelas ==
- Maximiliano y Carlota (1965) - Benito Juárez
- El refugio (1965)
- María Isabel (1966) - Pedro
- Las víctimas (1967)
- La tormenta (1967) - Benito Juárez
- Mi amor por ti (1969) - Roque
- La constitución (1970) - Jovito
- La Gata (1970/1971) - Don Lupe
- El carruaje (1972) - Benito Juárez
- Mundo de juguete (1974/1977) - Mateo
- Ven conmigo (1975/1976)
- Los bandidos de Río Frío (1976) - Bedolla
- Al salir el sol (1980) - Manuel
- Una limosna de amor (1981/1982) - Jeremías
- La traición (1984/1985) - Cholo
- Muchachita (1985/1986) - Pascual Sanchez
- Las grandes aguas (1989) - Graciano Alonso
- Más allá del puente (1993/1994) - Ángel
- Morir dos veces (1996) - Orduña
- Pueblo chico, infierno grande (1997) - Arcadio Zamora
- María Isabel (1997/1998) - Pedro
- Soñadoras (1998/1999) - Eugenio de La Peña
- La casa en la playa (2000) - Severo Rincón
- Atrévete a olvidarme (2001) - Cecilio Ramadán
- Las vías del amor (2002/2003) - Fidel Gutiérrez Arismendi
- Mariana de la noche (2003/2004) - Isidoro Valtierra
- Peregrina (2005/2006) - Castillo
- Amar sin límites (2006/2007) - Aurelio Huerta
- Tormenta en el paraíso (2007/2008) - Sacerdote Ahzac
- Cuidado con el ángel (2008/2009) - Andrés
- Sortilegio (2009) - Jesús "Chucho" Gavira
- Soy tu dueña (2010) - Sabino Mercado
- Un refugio para el amor (2012) - Galdino Jacinto
- Amor bravío (2012) - Padre Baldomero Lozano
- Corazón indomable (2013) - Padre Julián
- La candidata (2016/2017) - Miembro del Senado
- Mi adorable maldición (2017) - Ponciano Suárez
- Como dice el dicho (2017) - David
- Por amar sin ley (2018) - Armando
