= La gloria quedó atrás =

Mexican telenovela

- Genre: Telenovela
- Country of origin: Mexico
- Original language: Spanish
- No. of episodes: 30

Original release
- Network: Telesistema Mexicano
- Release: 1962

La gloria quedó atrás (English: The Glory Was Left Behind) is a Mexican telenovela produced by Televisa and broadcast by Telesistema Mexicano in 1962.

== Cast ==
- Sara García
- Tony Carbajal
- Patricia Morán
