= Mujer bonita =

- Created by: Inés Rodena
- Written by: Carlos Romero
- Directed by: Karina Duprez
- Starring: Adriana Fonseca; René Strickler; Abraham Ramos; María Sorté
- Opening theme: "Mujer bonita" by Pablo Montero
- Country of origin: Mexico
- Original language: Spanish
- No. of seasons: 1
- No. of episodes: 10

Production
- Executive producer: Ignacio Sada
- Editor: Víctor Hugo Flores
- Production company: Televisa

Original release
- Network: Canal de las Estrellas
- Release: April 2 – April 13, 2001

Related
- La mesera (1963); Abandonada (1985)

Mujer bonita (English: Pretty Woman) is a mini Mexican telenovela that lasted only two weeks of transmission, produced by Ignacio Sada for Televisa in 2001. It is an adaptation of the telenovela La mesera produced in 1963.

== Plot ==
Charito is a beautiful girl who falls in love with Orlando, a rich, young man whose parents oppose of their relationship. To be together, they decide to go to Mexico City, only to face many problems, especially economic, because Orlando does not get a job and his family refuses to support him in any way. Charito gets pregnant, and things gets complicated, because in addition she falls sick with anemia, resulting in her being admitted to the hospital. Meanwhile, Orlando starts to get tired of the situation, and even said himself it was a mistake to have abandoned all for Charito.

== Cast ==
- Adriana Fonseca as Charito
- René Strickler as José Enrique
- Abraham Ramos as Orlando
- María Sorté as Sol
- Alejandra Peniche as Rebeca
- Mónica Dossetti as Sandra
- Roberto Ballesteros as Servando
- Rosa María Bianchi as Carolina
- Beatriz Moreno as Jesusa
- Eduardo Liñán as Eleuterio
- Sharis Cid as Aurora
- Sherlyn as Milagros
- Silvia Caos as Doña Blanca
- Gloria Morell as Josefita
- Bárbara Gil as Mariana
- Ricardo Blume as Damián
- Claudio Báez as Dr. Somoza
- Laura Zapata/Silvia Manríquez as Celia
- Sergio Sendel as Miguel
- Lucero Lander as Dr. Garibay
- Sergio Reynoso as Enrique
- Guillermo García Cantú as Leopoldo
- César Castro as Sr. Martínez
- Maripaz García as Bernarda
- Isabel Martínez "La Tarabilla" as Rafaela
- Yessica Salazar as Nelly
- Sara Montes as Teresa
- Claudia Ortega as Micaela
- Héctor Parra as Daniel
- Eduardo Rodríguez as Virgilio
- Irma Torres as Filomena
- María Clara Zurita as Dominga
- Esperanza Rendón as La China
