= Cadenas de amor =

Mexican telenovela

- Genre: Telenovela
- Directed by: Rafael Banquells
- Starring: Ofelia Guilmáin; Aldo Monti; Angelines Fernández
- Country of origin: Mexico
- Original language: Spanish

Production
- Producer: Colgate-Palmolive

Original release
- Network: Telesistema Mexicano

Related
- Un paso al abismo; Cuidado con el ángel

Cadenas de amor is a Mexican telenovela produced by Televisa and originally aired by Telesistema Mexicano.

Ofelia Guilmáin and Aldo Monti starred as protagonists, and Angelines Fernández as the main antagonist.

== Cast ==
- Ofelia Guilmáin as Ana María
- Aldo Monti as Alfredo
- Angelines Fernández as Irma
- Maruja Grifell
- María Idalia as Tina
- Antonio Passy as Federico
- Antonio Raxel
- Violet Gabriel
- Antonio Racksed
