= Aldo Monti =

Mexican actor

- Born: Aldo Bartolomé Monteforte; 4 January 1929; Rome, Italy
- Died: 18 July 2016 (aged 87); McAllen, Texas, US
- Occupation(s): Actor, director
- Spouse: Teresa Grobois López
- Children: Laila Monteforte Grobois, Zaida Monteforte Grobois, Richard Monteforte Grobois

Aldo Bartolomé Monteforte (January 4, 1929 – July 18, 2016), better known as Aldo Monti, was a Mexican actor. He went to Venezuela in 1947. Although he was also a director, he was better known for his acting.

== Filmography ==
- Noche de milagros
- Al sur de Margarita
- La torre de marfil
- El diario de mi madre ‒ Carlos Montes
- Misterios de la magia negra ‒ Raúl
- Cadenas de amor
- Teresa ‒ Mario (1959)
- Las momias de Guanajuato (1962)
- Janina ‒ Rodolfo (1962)
- Valeria (1966 TV series)
- La razón de vivir (1966)
- El ídolo (1966)

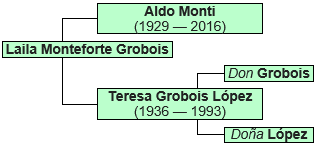
Family tree of Aldo Monti

- El misterio de los hongos alucinantes (1968)
- Pasión gitana (1968)
- Flor marchita ‒ Renato Conti (1969)
- El libro de piedra ‒ Carlos (1969)
- El amor de María Isabel ‒ Ariel (1970)
- Rubí ‒ Alejandro (1970)
- La venganza de las mujeres vampiro (1970)
- El amor tiene cara de mujer (1971)
- Santo y Blue Demon vs Drácula y el Hombre Lobo ‒ Count Dracula (1973)
- Barata de primavera ‒ Fernando Meraz (1975)
- Teresa Raquin ‒ Lorenzo
- Marcha nupcial ‒ Julio (1977)
- Una mujer (1978)
- Verónica ‒ Federico (1979)
- El hogar que yo robé ‒ Luis Felipe (1981)
- Confidente de secundaria (1996)
- Entre el amor y el odio ‒ Lorenzo Ponti (2002)
- Fray Justicia ‒ Federico (2009)

== Works directed by Monti ==
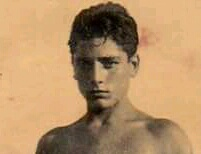
Monti aged 15

- Santo en Anónimo mortal
- Acapulco 12-22
- Querer volar
- Secuestro sangriento
- Vacaciones sangrientas
- Seducción sangrienta
- Horas violentas
- Obsesión asesina
- Uroboros
