= La mesera =

Mexican telenovela

- Genre: Telenovela
- Country of origin: Mexico
- Original language: Spanish

Original release
- Network: Telesistema Mexicano
- Release: 1963

La mesera is a Mexican telenovela produced by Televisa for Telesistema Mexicano in 1963.

== Cast ==
- María Elena Marqués
- Raúl Ramírez
- Raúl Meraz
- Jesús Valero
- Ada Carrasco
- Virginia Manzano
- Teresa Glabois
- Dalia Iñiguez
- Araceli Chavira
- Óscar Morelli
