= Mi esposa se divorcia =

Mexican telenovela

- Genre: Telenovela
- Directed by: Rafael Banquells
- Country of origin: Mexico
- Original language: Spanish

Production
- Producer: Colgate-Palmolive

Original release
- Network: Telesistema Mexicano

Related
- Honrarás a los tuyos; El precio del cielo

Mi esposa se divorcia is a Mexican telenovela produced by Televisa and originally transmitted by Telesistema Mexicano.

== Cast ==
- Lucy Gallardo
- Rafael Banquells
- Andrea Palma
- Bertha Moss
- Mercedes Pascual
- Pilar Souza
- Regina Llergo
- Luis Beristain
- Malena Doria
- Miguel Suárez
- Silvia Caos
- Roberto Meyer
- Silvia Suárez
- Amparo Villegas
- José Antonio Cossío
