= María Rivas (actress) =

Mexican actress (1931–2013)

- Born: María de los Dolores Rivas Diéguez; August 21, 1931; Las Ribas, Catalonia, Spain
- Died: January 14, 2013 (aged 81); Mexico City, Distrito Federal, Mexico
- Occupation: Actress
- Years active: 1952–1997
- Spouses: Carlos Baena (m. 1957–1958) Luis de Llano Palmer (m. 1964–1978)
- Children: Mario Baena Rivas (b. 1957); Miguel Palmer (1965-2007)

María Rivas (August 21, 1931 – January 14, 2013), was a Spanish television, film and stage actress. She worked with Televisa as an actress of telenovelas.

== Filmography ==
=== Film ===
Year	Title	Role	Notes
1952	Dos vidas		Debut film
1953	Hermano menor		
1953	Ha desaparecido un pasajero	Régina	
1954	Manicomio	Juana	
1954	Brindis al cielo		
1954	Elena		
1955	Señora Ama		
1955	Mañana cuando amanezca	Sonya	
1956	¡Aquí hay petróleo!	Rosalía	
1956	Pasión en el mar	Gloria	
1958	La máscara de carne	María	
1958	Secretaria peligrosa		
1958	Miércoles de ceniza	Silvia	
1958	Melancholic Autumn	Olga	
1960	El jinete solitario en el valle de los desaparecidos: La venganza del jinete solitario	Rosita	
1965	Misión Lisboa	María	
1969	Flor marchita	Esther Almada	
1969	La maestra inolvidable	Carmen Andrade Bravo	

=== Television ===
Year	Title	Role	Notes
1962	Janina	Janina	Lead role, 40 episodes
1962	La cobarde		Television debut, 59 episodes
1963	Vidas cruzadas		50 episodes
1963	La desconocida		50 episodes
1964	La máscara del ángel		3 episodes
1965	Maximiliano y Carlota		50 episodes
1965	Marina Lavalle		3 episodes
1966	El despertar	Nora	50 episodes
1966	El derecho de nacer	María Elena del Junco	Lead role, 99 episodes
1967	Lo prohibido		52 episodes
1969	Rosario	Rosario / Olvido	Lead role, 100 episodes
1969	Mi amor por ti	Silvia	86 episodes
1970	La gata		139 episodes
1977	Yo no pedí vivir	Soledad	3 episodes
1980	La divina Sarah	Croisette	3 episodes
1981	Los Pardaillan	Juana de Piennes	
1982	Leona Vicario	María del Soto	
1987	La indomable	Doña Adela	105 episodes
1996	La antorcha encendida	Virreina Inés de Jáuregui	1 episode
1997	Gente bien	Doña Sara Dumas	89 episodes, (final appearance)
