= Un paso al abismo =

- Genre: Telenovela; Drama
- Directed by: Rafael Banquells
- Starring: Silvia Derbez; Enrique Del Castillo
- No. of seasons: Rafael Banquells

Production
- Producer: Valentín Pimstein

Original release
- Network: Telesistema Mexicano
- Release: 1958 – 1959

Related
- Más allá de la angustia; Cadenas de amor

Un paso al abismo is one of the first Mexican soap operas in 1958. It was directed and produced by Rafael Banquells. This telenovela was aired in the 6:30 pm time slot on Canal 4, Telesistema Mexicano.

== Cast ==
- Silvia Derbez
- Luis Beristain
- Enrique Del Castillo
- Lorenzo de Rodas
- María Gentil Arcos
- Bárbara Gil
- Queta Lavat
- Mario Requena
