= Cuidado con el ángel (1959 TV series) =

- Genre: Telenovela
- Starring: Amparo Rivelles; Guillermo Aguilar; Ofelia Guilmáin
- Country of origin: Mexico
- Original language: Spanish.

Production
- Producer: Colgate-Palmolive

Original release
- Network: Telesistema Mexicano
- Release: 1959 – 1959

Related
- Cadenas de amor; Elisa

Cuidado con el ángel is a Mexican telenovela produced by Televisa and originally transmitted by Telesistema Mexicano.

Amparo Rivelles, Guillermo Aguilar, and Ofelia Guilmáin starred as protagonists.

== Cast ==
- Amparo Rivelles
- Guillermo Aguilar
- Ofelia Guilmáin
- Héctor Gómez
- Rosenda Monteros
- Arcelia Larrañaga
- Anita Blanch
