= Más allá de la angustia =

- Genre: Telenovela; Drama
- Created by: Mimí Bechelani
- Directed by: Rafael Banquells
- Starring: Alicia Montoya; Silvia Suárez; Silvia Caos; Dalia Iñiguez

Original release
- Network: Telesistema Mexicano
- Release: 1958 – 1958

Related
- Gutierritos; Un paso al abismo

Más allá de la angustia (Beyond Anguish) is the third telenovela produced in Mexico by Colgate-Palmolive and directed by Rafael Banquells in 1958 occupying the time slot previously held by Gutierritos at 6:30 PM with a duration of 30 minutes on Channel 4.

The telenovela had a high level of audience at first, but after going considerably low after a week, analysts determined it was because it occupied the time of a success and convince people not finished with this production.

It was mainly carried out by four actresses who play four women addressing their concerns and their lives as housewives, the protagonists were Dalia Iñiguez, Alicia Montoya, Silvia Suárez and, Silvia Caos.

== Cast ==
- Dalia Íñiguez
- Alicia Montoya
- Silvia Suárez
- Silvia Caos
- Nicolás Rodríguez
- Raúl Farell
- Francisco Jambrina
- Fanny Schiller
- Magda Guzmán
