= Ha llegado un extraño =

Mexican telenovela

- Genre: Telenovela
- Directed by: Rafael Banquells
- Country of origin: Mexico
- Original language: Spanish

Production
- Producer: Colgate-Palmolive

Original release
- Network: Telesistema Mexicano

Related
- Elisa; Honrarás a los tuyos

Ha llegado un extraño is a Mexican telenovela produced by Televisa and originally transmitted by Telesistema Mexicano.

== Cast ==
- Miguel Ángel Ferriz
- María Douglas
- Héctor Gómez
- Francisco Jambrina
- Alicia Montoya
- Silvia Caos
- Silvia Suárez
- Nicolás Rodríguez
- Pilar Souza
- Jorge Mateos
- Luis Gimeno
- José Antonio Cossío
