= Aarón Hernán =

Mexican actor (1930–2020)

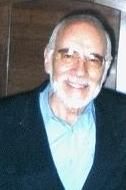
- Hernán in 2013
- Born: Aarón Hernández Rodríguez; 20 November 1930; Camargo, Chihuahua, Mexico
- Died: 26 April 2020 (aged 89); Mexico City, Mexico
- Occupation: Actor
- Years active: 1947–2020

Aarón Hernán (Spanish pronunciation: [aˈɾon eɾˈnan]; 20 November 1930 – 26 April 2020) was a Mexican telenovela and film actor.

== Early life ==
Aarón Hernán was born on 20 November 1930, in Camargo, Chihuahua, Mexico, as Aarón Hernández Rodríguez.

== Selected filmography ==
- The Garden of Aunt Isabel (1971)

== Death ==
Hernán died on 26 April 2020, aged 89, from acute myocardial infarction while recovering from hip surgery.

== See also ==
- List of Sortilegio characters
