= El precio del cielo =

Mexican telenovela

- Genre: Telenovela
- Written by: Fernanda Villeli
- Country of origin: Mexico
- Original language: Spanish

Production
- Producer: Colgate-Palmolive

Original release
- Network: Telesistema Mexicano

Related
- Mi esposa se divorcia; Teresa

El precio del cielo is a Mexican telenovela produced by Televisa and originally broadcast by Telesistema Mexicano.

== Cast ==
- Miguel Manzano
- María Tereza Montoya
- Luis Beristain
- Malú Gatica
- Bárbara Gil
- Ismael Larumbe
- Juan Salido
- Bertha Moss
- Ada Carrasco
