= Patricia Ancira =

Mexican actress

- Born: Patricia Ancira Berny; Feb 22 1960; Mexico City, D.F., Mexico
- Occupations: Actress, Stage Director, Producer, Creator of successful Communication Methodologies and Leadership Master Coach
- Years active: 1977-1988, 2009
- Children: Alesh Ancira
- Parent: Carlos Ancira Negrete y Thelma Berny Castilla
- Relatives: Selma Ancira - Jorge Negrete

Patricia Ancira, born Patricia Ancira Berny in Mexico City, D.F., Mexico is a Mexican actress.

== Early life ==
Ancira was born in Mexico City, D.F., Mexico.

In 1978 she played in the telenovela Un original y veinte copias. Later played in the telenovelas Rosalía, Colorina, Vanessa, Rosa Salvaje and Sortilegio.

== Filmography ==
Telenovelas, Films
Year	Title	Role	Notes					
1977	Ifigenia		Film					
1978	Un original y veinte copias	Katty	Protagonist					
1978	Rosalía	Olga	Supporting Role					
1979	La guerra santa	Carmen	Film					
1980	El diario de Ana Frank		Film					
1980	Colorina	Lupe	Supporting Role					
1981	Barrio de campeones		Film					
1982	Vanessa	Ana	Supporting Role	1983 - 87 - Don Juan Tenorio	1987-88	Rosa Salvaje	Estela Gómez	Supporting Role
2009	Sortilegio	Bertha	Supporting Role					

== Artistic career ==
The daughter of actor Carlos Ancira and writer Thelma Berny, Ancira pursued a career in theater, film, and television. Among her early film appearances was Ifigenia (1977), mentioned in a 2016 interview published by Milenio Novedades.

== Taller Escénico Ancira ==
After settling in Mérida, Yucatán, she founded Taller Escénico Ancira (TEA), a performing arts academy dedicated to training in disciplines such as acting, singing, screenwriting, makeup, and set design. According to a 2016 newspaper interview, the academy operated for nearly two decades.

== Consulting and professional training ==
Ancira subsequently expanded her professional activities through Ancira Consultores, a consulting organization dedicated to communication and comprehensive leadership development in the public and private sectors.

Her programs include Excelencia Integral, El poder de la palabra, Memorable Service, and Juicios Orales: Comunicación, Persuasión y Percepción.

On April 24, 2014, the Plenary Session of the Superior Court of Justice of the State of Yucatán authorized an advance payment to Patricia Ancira Berny for the delivery of the training program Juicios Orales: Comunicación, Persuasión y Percepción, developed by Ancira Consultores.
