= Elisa (1959 TV series) =

- Genre: Telenovela
- Country of origin: Mexico
- Original language: Spanish

Production
- Producer: Forhans

Original release
- Network: Telesistema Mexicano

Related
- Cuidado con el ángel; Ha llegado un extraño

Elisa is a Mexican telenovela produced by Televisa and originally transmitted by Telesistema Mexicano.

== Cast ==
- Silvia Derbez
- Enrique del Castillo
- José Gálvez
