= Honrarás a los tuyos (1959 TV series) =

Mexican telenovela

- Genre: Telenovela
- Written by: Kenya Perea
- Directed by: Rafael Banquells
- Country of origin: Mexico
- Original language: Spanish

Production
- Producer: Colgate-Palmolive

Original release
- Network: Telesistema Mexicano

Related
- Ha llegado un extraño; Mi esposa se divorcia

Honrarás a los tuyos is a Mexican telenovela produced by Televisa and originally broadcast by Telesistema Mexicano.

== Cast ==
- Dalia Íñiguez
- Carlos Agostí
- Pilar Pellicer
- Nelida Ponse
