= Rosenda Monteros =

Mexican actress (1935–2018)

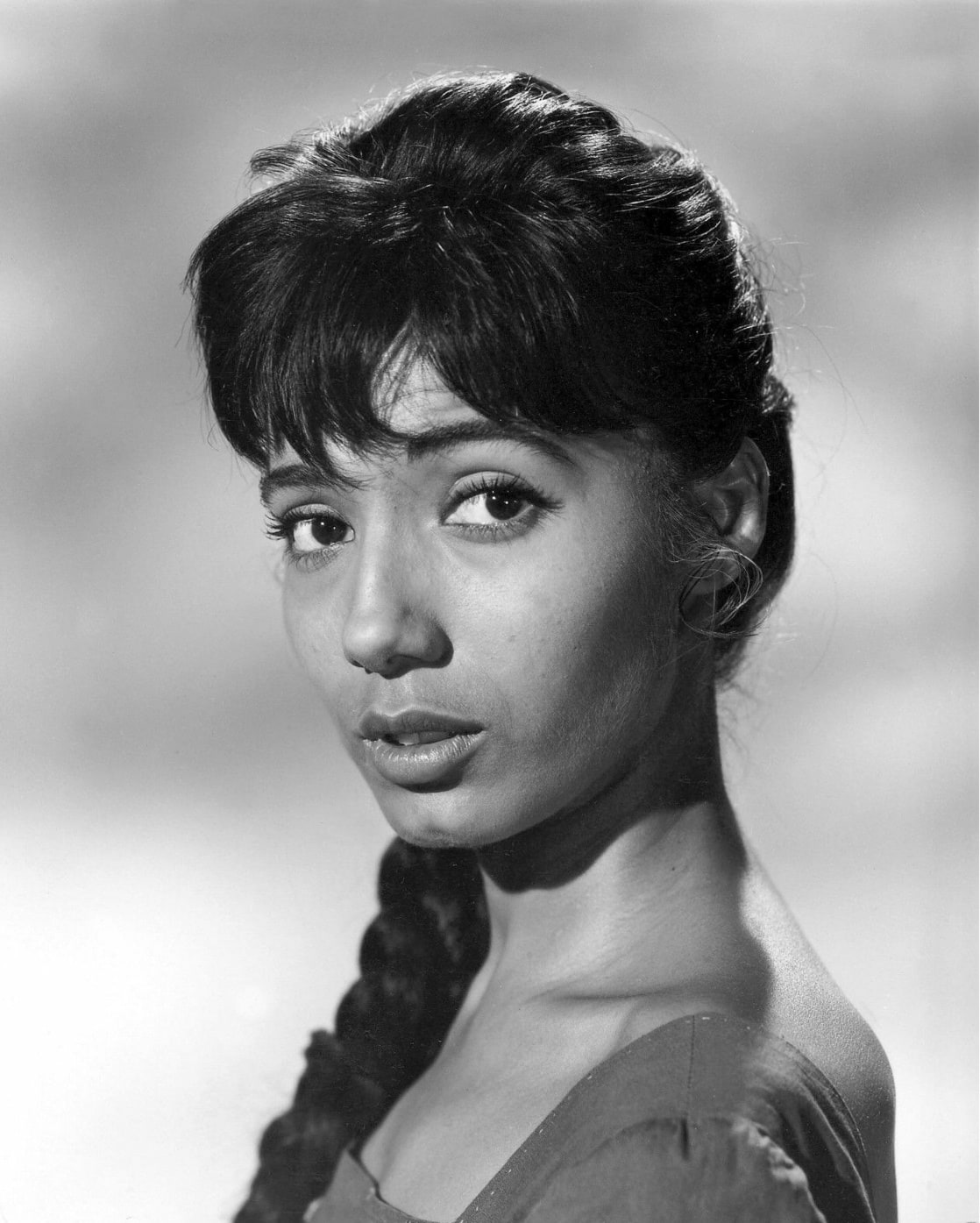
- Monteros in The Magnificent Seven (1960)
- Born: Rosa Méndez Leza; 31 August 1935; Veracruz, Veracruz, Mexico
- Died: 29 December 2018 (aged 83); Mexico City
- Occupation: Actress
- Spouse: Julio Bracho (m. 1955; div. 1957)

Rosa Méndez Leza (31 August 1935 – 29 December 2018), known professionally as Rosenda Monteros, was a Mexican actress. She studied drama under Seki Sano. To American audiences, she is best known for her role as Petra in The Magnificent Seven. She had a prolific film career north and south of the U.S.–Mexican border.

Monteros was born in Veracruz. She moved to Mexico City when she was 17.

From 1955 to 1957, she was married to director Julio Bracho.

== Partial filmography ==
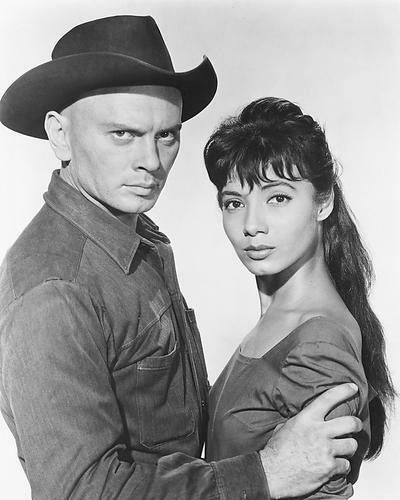
Monteros with Yul Brynner in The Magnificent Seven (1960)

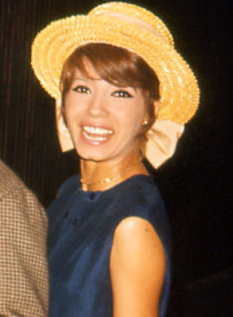
Monteros in 1965

- Reto a la vida (1954) — María (uncredited)
- Take Me in Your Arms (1954) — Martha
- The White Orchid (1954) — Lupita
- María la Voz (1955) — Isabel
- A Woman's Devotion (1956) — María
- Feliz año, amor mío (1957) — Luisa
- El diario de mi madre (1958) — Enedina
- Las tres pelonas (1958) — María
- Villa!! (1958) — Marianna Villa
- La gran caída (1958)
- Nazarín (1959) — La Prieta
- Sábado negro (1959)
- La ciudad sagrada (1959)
- El Esqueleto de la señora Morales (1960) — Meche, the servant
- The Magnificent Seven (1960) — Petra
- Los cuervos (1961) — Laura
- Tiara Tahiti (1962) — Belle Annie
- The Mighty Jungle (1964) — Orica
- Valería (1965, TV Series)
- She (1965) — Ustane
- Ninette y un señor de Murcia (1965) — Ninette
- Savage Pampas (1966) — Rucu
- Eve (1968) — Pili Conchita
- ¡Dame un poco de amooor...! (1968) — Chin Sao Ling
- Un Extraño en la Casa (1968) — Diana
- Coleccionista de cadáveres, El (1970) — Valerie
- Los perros de Dios (1974)
- Rapiña (1975)
- Las siete cucas (1981) — Benita's Servant
- La casa de Bernarda Alba (1982) — Martirio
- Sexo impostor (2005)
