= Senda prohibida =

- Genre: Telenovela; Drama
- Written by: Fernanda Villeli
- Starring: Silvia Derbez; Francisco Jambrina; Dalia Iñiguez; Héctor Gómez; Bárbara Gil
- Country of origin: Mexico
- Original language: Spanish
- No. of episodes: 60

Production
- Executive producer: Jesús Gómez Obregón
- Running time: 30 minutes
- Production company: Telesistema Mexicano

Original release
- Network: Canal 4
- Release: June 12 – July 20, 1958

Related
- Gutierritos; El dolor de amar

Senda Prohibida (English title: Forbidden Path) is the first telenovela produced in Mexico. It was produced by Telesistema Mexicano and was broadcast from 12 June to 20 July 1958, from Monday to Friday.

It stars Silvia Derbez as the protagonist / antagonist, with Francisco Jambrina, Dalia Íñiguez, Alicia Montoya and Héctor Gómez.

== Plot ==
This is the story of an ambitious secretary, Nora (Silvia Derbez), who falls in love with her wealthy boss (Francisco Jambrina), who is married to a respectable woman (Dalia Iniguez), with whom he has a child (Hector Gomez). The provincial cunning, in exchange for caresses, receive gifts and jewelry from her boss which leads to his ruin. In the end, Nora cries in her wedding dress in front of her mirror, regretting all the damage she's done.

== Cast ==
- Silvia Derbez - Nora
- Francisco Jambrina - Federico García
- Dalia Íñiguez - Irene
- Héctor Gómez - Roberto
- Bárbara Gil
- Julio Alemán
- Augusto Benedico
- María Idalia - Clemen
- Luis Beristain
- Alicia Montoya
- Jorge Lavat
- Miguel Suárez
- Beatriz Sheridan
- Rafael Banquells
- María Antonieta de las Nieves - Dalia
