= Gutierritos =

- Genre: Telenovela; Drama
- Directed by: Rafael Banquells
- Starring: Rafael Banquells; María Teresa Rivas; Mauricio Garcés; Patricia Morán; Evita Muñoz "Chachita"; Miguel Córcega; Luis de Alba
- No. of episodes: 50

Production
- Producer: Valentín Pimstein
- Production company: Telesistema Mexicano

Original release
- Network: Canal 4
- Release: 1958 – 1958

Related
- Senda prohibida; Más allá de la angustia

Gutierritos is the second telenovela produced in Mexico by Valentín Pimstein in 1958 for Telesistema Mexicano.

With an original script by Estella Calderón and directed and starred by Rafael Banquells besides Maria Teresa Rivas and Mauricio Garcés, Gutierritos is about a humble man abused by his family, friends, and co-workers.

== Plot ==
Ángel Gutiérrez is a kind, friendly, and very shy office employee who works hard for his family. His wife Rosa, who treats him very badly and humiliates him all the time, despises him for being "so pathetic", having only married him because she felt it was her last opportunity to do so, fearing growing old alone. Their children, Julio César and Lucrecia, do not respect their father either, after years of seeing their mother constantly mistreating him and calling him "a pathetic, good for nothing".

At the office, everyone teases Ángel, including his boss Mr. Martinez who, after hearing Ángel's wife always asking for "Gutierritos" whenever she calls at the office, also starts calling him that, causing the other employees to catch on. Angel's only moral support at work is his friend Jorge, for whom Rosa has always felt an unrequited love. Ángel confides his biggest secret to Jorge: his passion for writing. Along the way, Mr. Martínez hires Elena, a somewhat shy and insecure, but very beautiful young woman.

Ángel secretly writes a book, "The Memories of Mr. Gutiérrez", in which he expresses his true feelings and desires. He shows it to Jorge and, impressed by its quality, he convinces Ángel to publish it. Ángel agrees on the condition that it is published under the pseudonym of "Mr. Gutiérrez". The book becomes a bestseller and earns Ángel good profits, so he quits his job. Seeing his friend's confidence outburst, Jorge follows and does so as well, calling their former boss "Martinitos". Ángel intends to establish a library, with Jorge as his partner; however, Ángel claims that the business is Jorge's, and that he is being hired as his assistant. Jorge and Elena fall in love with one another and eventually they get married. One day, Elena finds some of the original writings and assumes that Jorge is the author, Mr. Gutiérrez. Awed by "Jorge's talent", a dinner is hosted in his honor. Friends that Ángel has secretly been helping praise and thank Jorge, accuse him of being jealous of his friend's success, while Rosa berates and humiliates Ángel more than ever.

While initially reluctantly, Jorge, growing tired of Ángel's cowardice, does not clear up the misunderstanding and continues to enjoy the fame, the success and Elena's love. After enduring so much humiliation and suffering the progressive loss of his friend, his book, his family and his dignity, Ángel finally explodes and tries to tell the truth, but no one believes him.

== Cast ==
- Rafael Banquells - Ángel Gutiérrez "Gutierritos"
- María Teresa Rivas - Rosa Hernández
- Carlos Navarro as Juan Ortega
- Dina de Marco as Anita
- Manuel Lozano as Médina
- Vicky Aguirre as Lupita
- Mauricio Garcés as Jorge Contreras
- Patricia Morán as Elena
- Gerardo del Castillo as Señor Martínez
- Josefina Escobedo as Tía de Rosa
- Andrea López as Ágatha
- Elvira Quintana as Señora Gutiérrez
- Miguél Suárez as Señor Fernández
- María Eugenia Llamas as Lucrecia
- Luis de Alba as Julio Cesar
