= Silvia Derbez =

Mexican actress (1932–2002)

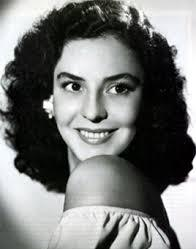
- Derbez in the 1950s
- Born: Lucille Silvia Derbez Amézquita; March 8, 1932; San Luis Potosí, Mexico
- Died: April 6, 2002 (aged 70); Mexico City, Mexico
- Occupation: Actress
- Years active: 1949–2001
- Children: Eugenio Derbez

Lucille Silvia Derbez Amézquita, better known as Silvia Derbez (March 8, 1932 – April 6, 2002) was a Mexican film and television actress. She was the lead actress in the first telenovela produced in Mexico, Senda Prohibida.

== Biography ==
Derbez was born in San Luis Potosí, Mexico on March 8, 1932. She is the daughter of French businessman Marcel Derbez Gilly and María de la Luz Amézquita, a Mexican housewife. As a young child, she studied dance, and then began performing in dance theater. At age 13, she began to learn acting with Seki Sano.

Her first participation in film was as an extra in the 1948 film Tarzan and the Mermaids. She debuted in Mexican film in the 1947 film La Novia del Mar (The Bride of the Sea). Her early film career included Allá en el Rancho Grande (Out on the Big Ranch) in 1948, and the role of Beatriz in the classic cabaretera film noir Salón México.

In the 1958 telenovela Senda prohibida (Forbidden Way), the first daily telenovela broadcast in Mexico, Derbez played the lead role of Nora. Derbez also played the title role in the telenovela Elisa.

In addition to her film and television career, Derbez performed in theatrical productions, and formed the Derbez-Banquells theater company with Rafael Banquells. She also had a career in radio, which included a radio program where she sang with the Juan García Esquivel orchestra, participation in a variety of XEQ and XEW programs, and work as a professionally licensed announcer for commercials and programs.

Her career in film and telenovelas in the 1960s and 1970s included the telenovela María Isabel in 1966, where she played the title role, and the lead role in the telenovela Cruz de amor in 1968. During the 1970s, her telenovela work included Angelitos negros (Black Angels), El derecho de los hijos (Your Children's Rights) and La recogida (The collection). In 1975 and 1976, she played Caridad in Ven conmigo (Come with Me). From 1977 to 1978, she had a lead role in Acompáñame.

During the 1980s, her work included participation in a remake of one of Latin America's most popular telenovelas, Simplemente Maria, in 1989. In the 1990s, her acting career included the 1993 film Zapatos Viejos (Old Shoes), the role of Milagros in the telenovela Lazos de Amor and the role of Leonor in the telenovela Los hijos de nadie (Nobody's Children), and a role in the 1998 telenovela La usurpadora (The supplanter).

Her final role in a telenovela was in La intrusa (The Intruder) in 2001.

She died on April 6, 2002, aged 70, from lung cancer.

== Awards ==
- 1957 nomination, Ariel Award for Best Supporting Actress, for El rey de México
- 1974 Virginia Fábregas Medal, Asociación Nacional de Actores (ANDA)

== Family ==
Derbez married Eugenio González Sánchez de Tagle in 1957, and they had two children: Eugenio, and Silvia Eugenia Derbez. Her husband Eugenio González died in 1986. Her granddaughter, Aislinn Derbez, is an actress. Two other grandchildren, Vadhir Derbez and José Eduardo Derbez, are actors as well.
