= List of Televisa telenovelas (1960s) =

The following is a list of telenovelas produced by Televisa from the years 1960 to 1969.

== 1960 ==
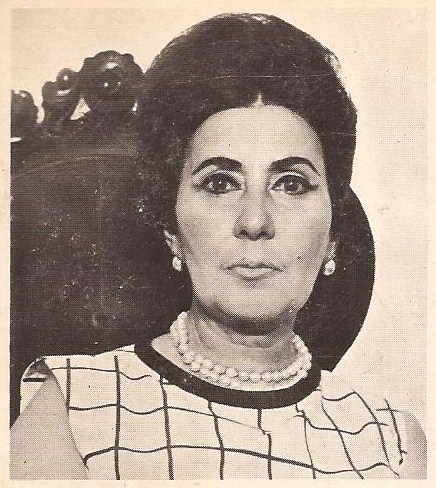
Some works of Guadalupe Dueñas were adapted in Maximiliano y Carlota, Leyendas de México and Las momias de Guanajuato.

#	Year	Title	Author	Director	Ref.
13	1960	Amar fue su pecado	Leopoldo Labra	Rafael Banquells	
14	1960	La ambiciosa	Raúl Astor	Raúl Astor	
15	1960	Cartas de amor	Julio Alejandro	Ernesto Alonso	
16	1960	La casa del odio	Carmen Montejo	Ernesto Alonso	
17	1960	Claudia	Mimí Bechelani	Leopoldo Labra	
18	1960	Donde comienza la tristeza	Raúl Astor	Rafael Banquells	
19	1960	Dos caras tiene el destino	Maricruz Olivier	Ernesto Alonso	
20	1960	Espejo de sombras	Ofelia Guilmáin	Ernesto Alonso	
21	1960	Gabriela	María Teresa Rivas	Angelines Fernández	
22	1960	El hombre de oro	Raúl Astor	Rafael Banquells	
23	1960	El juicio de los padres	José Gálvez	Ernesto Alonso	
24	1960	María Guadalupe	Raúl Astor	Luz María Aguilar	
25	1960	Mi amor frente al pasado	Kenya Perea	Ernesto Alonso	
26	1960	La mujer dorada	Hugo Argüelles	Ernesto Alonso	
27	1960	Murallas blancas	Gabriel Guerrero	Ernesto Alonso	
28	1960	El otro	Caridad Bravo Adams	Germán Robles	
29	1960	Pecado mortal	Caridad Bravo Adams	Raúl Astor	
30	1960	Pensión de mujeres	Raúl Astor	Amparo Rivelles	
31	1960	El rapto	Carmen Montejo	Jesús Valero	
32	1960	Un rostro en el pasado	Fernanda Villeli	Rafael Banquells	
33	1960	Secretaria o mujer	Tony Carbajal	Rafael Banquells	
34	1960	Vida por vida	Jacqueline Andere	Rafael Banquells	

== 1961 ==
#	Year	Title	Author	Director	Ref.
35	1961	Abismos de amor	Manuel Canseco Noriega	Francisco Jambrina	
36	1961	Bajo la sombra de los almendros	Silvia Derbez	Ernesto Alonso	
37	1961	La brújula rota	Jorge Mistral	Manolo Calvo	
38	1961	Cielo sin estrellas	Germán Robles	Ernesto Alonso	
39	1961	Conflicto	Marissa Garrido	Ernesto Alonso	
40	1961	Cuatro en la trampa	Ignacio López Tarso	Adriana Roel	
41	1961	Culpas ajenas	Silvia Caos	Francisco Jambrina	
42	1961	Divorciadas	Germán Robles	Rafael Banquells	
43	1961	Don Bosco	Benjamín Torre Haro	Jesús Valero	
44	1961	Elena	Estella Calderón	Rafael Banquells	
45	1961	El enemigo	Caridad Bravo Adams	Ernesto Alonso	
46	1961	Estafa de amor	Caridad Bravo Adams	Ernesto Alonso	
47	1961	La familia del 6	Miguel Ángel Ferriz	Angelines Fernández	
48	1961	Las gemelas	Marissa Garrido	Ernesto Alonso	
49	1961	La honra de vivir	Elsa Cárdenas	Freddy Fernández	
50	1961	La insaciable	Carmen Montejo	Lorenzo de Rodas	
51	1961	La leona	Marissa Garrido	Ernesto Alonso	
52	1961	Marianela	Benito Pérez Galdós	Ernesto Alonso	
53	1961	No basta ser médico	Tony Carbajal	Francisco Jambrina	
54	1961	Una noche sin mañana	María Teresa Rivas	Héctor Gómez	
55	1961	Niebla	Marissa Garrido	Ernesto Alonso	
56	1961	Risas amargas	Miguel Ángel Ferriz	Miguel Córcega	
57	1961	La sospecha	Tony Carbajal	Ernesto Alonso	
58	1961	La telaraña	Angelines Fernández	Francisco Jambrina	
59	1961	Vida robada	Claudio Brook	Ernesto Alonso	

== 1962 ==
#	Year	Title	Author	Director	Ref.
60	1962	La actriz	Magda Guzmán	Ernesto Alonso	
61	1962	Adiós, amor mío	Caridad Bravo Adams	Ernesto Alonso	
62	1962	Borrasca	Maricruz Olivier	Ernesto Alonso	
63	1962	El caminante	Ariadna Welter	Ernesto Alonso	
64	1962	La cobarde	María Teresa Rivas	Ernesto Alonso	
65	1962	Codicia	Carlos Lozana Dana	Rafael Banquells	
66	1962	Encadenada	José Gálvez	Ernesto Alonso	
67	1962	La gloria quedó atrás	Tony Carbajal	Ernesto Alonso	
68	1962	La herencia	María Teresa Rivas	Joaquín Cordero	
69	1962	La herida del tiempo	Miguel Ángel Ferriz	Angelines Fernández	
70	1962	Un hijo cayó del cielo	Bárbara Gil	Miguel Córcega	
71	1962	Janina	José Gálvez	Ernesto Alonso	
72	1962	La madrastra	Arturo Moya Grau	Jesús Valero	
73	1962	Marcela	Francisco Jambrina	Ernesto Alonso	
74	1962	Las momias de Guanajuato	Hugo Argüelles	Ernesto Alonso	
75	1962	Mujercitas	Elsa Cárdenas	Ernesto Alonso	
76	1962	Penumbra	Silvia Derbez	Francisco Jambrina	
77	1962	Prisionera	José Gálvez	Ernesto Alonso	
78	1962	El profesor Valdez	Mimí Bechelani	Francisco Jambrina	
79	1962	Sor Juana Inés de la Cruz	José Morris	Ernesto Alonso	

== 1963 ==
#	Year	Title	Author	Director	Ref.
80	1963	Agonía de amor	José Gálvez	Ernesto Alonso	
81	1963	Cita con la muerte	Jacqueline Andere	Rafael Banquells	
82	1963	La culpa de los padres	Fernanda Villeli	Valentín Pimstein	
83	1963	La desconocida	María Teresa Rivas	Aldo Monti	
84	1963	Destino	Rafael Banquells	Ernesto Alonso	
85	1963	Doña Macabra	Hugo Argüelles	Ernesto Alonso	
86	1963	Eugenia	Maricruz Olivier	Bertha Moss	
87	1963	La familia Miau	Alejandro Ciangherotti	Eduardo Fajardo	
88	1963	Grandes ilusiones	Aurora Molina	Ernesto Alonso	
89	1963	Lo imperdonable	Silvia Derbez	Eric del Castillo	
90	1963	Madres egoístas	Mimí Bechelani	Jesús Valero	
91	1963	La mesera	Fernanda Villeli	Jesús Valero	
92	1963	Mi mujer y yo	José Gálvez	Enrique Rambal	
93	1963	Las modelos	Ariadna Welter	Ernesto Alonso	
94	1963	Pablo y Elena	Carlos Lozana Dana	Francisco Jambrina	
95	1963	El secreto	José Gálvez	Jesús Valero	
96	1963	La sombra del otro	Luz María Aguilar	Aldo Monti	
97	1963	Traicionera	José Gálvez	Luis Aragón	
98	1963	Tres caras de mujer	Amparo Rivelles	Ernesto Alonso	
99	1963	Vidas cruzadas	Carlos Ancira	Adriana Roel	
100	1963	Vivimos en una estrella	Beatriz Aguirre	Francisco Jambrina	

== 1964 ==
#	Year	Title	Author	Director	Ref.
101	1964	Apasionada	Carmen Montejo	Ernesto Alonso	
102	1964	Central de emergencia	Gabriel Guerrero	Francisco Jambrina	
103	1964	El crisol	Gabriel Guerrero	Tony Carbajal	
104	1964	Cumbres Borrascosas	Germán Robles	Ernesto Alonso	
105	1964	Debiera haber obispas	Anita Blanch	Luis Aragón	
106	1964	Desencuentro	Germán Robles	Ernesto Alonso	
107	1964	El dolor de vivir	Maricruz Olivier	Rafael Banquells	
108	1964	Gabriela	María Teresa Rivas	Ernesto Alonso	
109	1964	Historia de un cobarde	Mimí Bechelani	Ernesto Alonso	
110	1964	La intrusa	Luz María Aguilar	José Elías Moreno	
111	1964	Juan José	Maricruz Olivier	Raúl Chato Padilla	
112	1964	Juicio de almas	Ofelia Guilmáin	Aldo Monti	
113	1964	La máscara del ángel	María Teresa Rivas	Guillermo Murray	
114	1964	México 1900	Fernanda Villeli	Ernesto Alonso	
115	1964	La piel de Zapa	Elsa Cárdenas	Carlos Agostí	
116	1964	San Martín de Porres	Fernanda Villeli	René Muñoz	
117	1964	Siempre tuya	Miguel Ángel Ferriz	Valentín Pimstein	
118	1964	La vecindad	Jacqueline Andere	Miguel Manzano	

== 1965 ==
#	Year	Title	Author	Director	Ref.
119	1965	El abismo	Carlos Lozana Dana	Ernesto Alonso	
120	1965	Las abuelas	Mimí Bechelani	Jesús Valero	
121	1965	Alma de mi alma	Jacqueline Andere	Enrique Álvarez Félix	
122	1965	La calle en que vivimos	Andrea Palma	Alejandro Ciangherotti	
123	1965	Casa de huéspedes	Ofelia Guilmáin	Antonio Medellín	
124	1965	Corona de lágrimas	Manuel Canseco Noriega	Valentín Pimstein	
125	1965	Un largo amor	Queta Lavat	Enrique García Álvarez	
126	1965	Llamado urgente	Amparo Rivelles	Ernesto Alonso	
127	1965	Marina Lavalle	María Teresa Rivas	Ernesto Alonso	
128	1965	Maximiliano y Carlota	Guadalupe Dueñas	Ernesto Alonso	
129	1965	La mentira	Caridad Bravo Adams	Ernesto Alonso	
130	1965	Una mujer	Andrea Cotto	Ernesto Alonso	
131	1965	Nuestro barrio	José Gálvez	Julio Alemán	
132	1965	Puente de cristal	Kenya Perea	José Morris	
133	1965	El refugio	Ofelia Guilmáin	Ernesto Alonso	
134	1965	Secreto de confesión	Carmen Montejo	Ernesto Alonso	
135	1965	La sembradora	Gabriel Guerrero	Valentín Pimstein	
136	1965	Tormenta de pasiones	Caridad Bravo Adams	Sebastián Ligarde	
137	1965	Tú eres un extraño	Francisco Jambrina	Ernesto Alonso	

== 1966 ==
#	Year	Title	Author	Director	Ref.
138	1966	Amor y orgullo	Fernanda Villeli	Enrique Rambal	
139	1966	La búsqueda	Carlos Lozana Dana	Ernesto Alonso	
140	1966	Cita en la gloria	Valentín Pimstein	Jesús Valero	
141	1966	Corazón salvaje	Caridad Bravo Adams	Ernesto Alonso	
142	1966	El corrido de Lupe Reyes	Gabriel Guerrero	Valentín Pimstein	
143	1966	Cristina Guzmán	Caridad Bravo Adams	Ernesto Alonso	
144	1966	El derecho de nacer	Adriana Roel	Ernesto Alonso	
145	1966	El despertar	Carlos Lozana Dana	Ernesto Alonso	
146	1966	El dolor de amar	Elvira Quintana	Jesús Valero	
147	1966	La dueña	Jacqueline Andere	Miguel Manzano	
148	1966	La duquesa	Francisco Jambrina	Rafael Banquells	
149	1966	El espejismo brillaba	Fernanda Villeli	Ernesto Alonso	
150	1966	Gutierritos	Estella Calderón	Rafael Banquells	
151	1966	El ídolo	Francisco Jambrina	Rafael Banquells	
152	1966	María Isabel	Yolanda Vargas Dulché	Valentín Pimstein	
153	1966	Más fuerte que tu amor	Enrique Lizalde	Ernesto Alonso	
154	1966	El homogéneo	Luz María Aguilar	Ernesto Alonso	
155	1966	Los medio hogares	Carmen Montejo	Alejandro Ciangherotti	
156	1966	El medio pelo	Magda Guzmán	Eric del Castillo	
157	1966	Nuestro pequeño mundo	José Gálvez	Andrea Cotto	
158	1966	El patio de Tlaquepaque	Carlos Lozana Dana	Ernesto Alonso	
159	1966	La razón de vivir	Carmen Montejo	Ernesto Alonso	
160	1966	La sombra del pecado	Silvia Derbez	Enrique Aguilar	
161	1966	Sonata de otoño	Carlos Navarro	Adriana Roel	
162	1966	Valeria	Jacqueline Andere	Ernesto Alonso	
163	1966	Vértigo	Valentín Pimstein	Francisco Jambrina	

== 1967 ==
#	Year	Title	Author	Director	Ref.
164	1967	Adriana	Magda Guzmán	Rafael Banquells	
165	1967	Amor en el desierto	Caridad Bravo Adams	Enrique Rambal	
166	1967	Amor sublime	Mimí Bechelani	Carlos Ancira	
167	1967	Un ángel en el fango	Arturo Moya Grau	Valentín Pimstein	
168	1967	Angustia del pasado	Fernanda Villeli	Jesús Valero	
169	1967	Anita de Montemar	Valentín Pimstein	Jesús Valero	
170	1967	Atormentada	Patricia Morán	Enrique Aguilar	
171	1967	La casa de las fieras	Rita Macedo	Alicia Bonet	
172	1967	Un color para tu piel	José Morris	Ernesto Alonso	
173	1967	El cuarto mandamiento	Mimí Bechelani	Valentín Pimstein	
174	1967	Cuna vacía	Luz María Aguilar	Miguel Córcega	
175	1967	Deborah	Caridad Bravo Adams	Ernesto Alonso	
176	1967	Detrás del muro	Patricia Morán	Alejandro Ciangherotti	
177	1967	Dicha robada	Carmen Montejo	José Morris	
178	1967	La duda	Luz María Aguilar	Joaquín Cordero	
179	1967	Ellas	Hilda Aguirre	Luis Aragón	
180	1967	Engáñame	Jacqueline Andere	Carlos Piñar	
181	1967	Entre sombras	Marissa Garrido	Ernesto Alonso	
182	1967	Felipa Sánchez, la soldadera	Elvira Quintana	Eric del Castillo	
183	1967	La frontera	Julissa	Ernesto Alonso	
184	1967	Gente sin historia	Chucho Salinas	Alma Delia Fuentes	
185	1967	Incertidumbre	Fernanda Villeli	Jesús Valero	
186	1967	El juicio de nuestros hijos	Enrique Rambal	Ernesto Alonso	
187	1967	Lágrimas amargas	Xavier Rojas	Ernesto Alonso	
188	1967	No quiero lágrimas	Silvia Derbez	Carlos Navarro	
189	1967	Obsesión	Fernanda Villeli	Valentín Pimstein	
190	1967	Un pobre hombre	Fernanda Villeli	José Morris	
191	1967	Lo prohibido	Carlos Bracho	Ernesto Alonso	
192	1967	Rocambole	Germán Robles	Julio Alemán	
193	1967	Sueña conmigo, Donaji	Caridad Bravo Adams	Ernesto Alonso	
194	1967	La tormenta	Miguel Sabido	Raúl Araiza	
195	1967	El usurpador	Gabriel Guerrero	Valentín Pimstein	
196	1967	Las víctimas	Mimí Bechelani	Jesús Valero	
197	1967	Una mentira	Silvia Derbez	Francisco Jambrina	

== 1968 ==
#	Year	Title	Author	Director	Ref.
198	1968	Águeda	Caridad Bravo Adams	Xavier Rojas	
199	1968	Aurelia	Patricia Morán	Valentín Pimstein	
200	1968	Cárcel de mujeres	Anabelle Gutiérrez	Carlos Navarro	
201	1968	Los Caudillos	Fausto Zerón Medina	Ernesto Alonso	
202	1968	Chucho el roto	Fernando Wagner	Valentín Pimstein	
203	1968	Cruz de amor	Manuel Canseco Noriega	Valentín Pimstein	
204	1968	Cynthia	Marga López	Enrique Rambal	
205	1968	Destino la gloria	Adalberto Martínez	Miguel Córcega	
206	1968	Duelo de pasiones	Marissa Garrido	Eric del Castillo	
207	1968	En busca del paraíso	Jacqueline Andere	Ernesto Alonso	
208	1968	Estafa de amor	Caridad Bravo Adams	Ernesto Alonso	
209	1968	Fallaste corazón	Cuco Sánchez	Valentín Pimstein	
210	1968	Un grito en la oscuridad	Guadalupe Dueñas	Francisco Jambrina	
211	1968	Los inconformes	Carlos Ancira	José Morris	
212	1968	Intriga	Anita Blanch	Raúl Ramírez	
213	1968	Juventud divino tesoro	Irma Lozano	Héctor Bonilla	
214	1968	Leyendas de México	Hugo Argüelles	Ernesto Alonso	
215	1968	Mariana	Valentín Pimstein	Jesús Valero	
216	1968	Mi maestro	Pilar Sen	Miguel Manzano	
217	1968	Mujeres sin amor	Magda Guzmán	Miguel Manzano	
218	1968	El padre Guernica	José Morris	Ernesto Alonso	
219	1968	Pasión gitana	Caridad Bravo Adams	Xavier Rojas	
220	1968	Pueblo sin esperanza	Mimí Bechelani	José Gálvez	
221	1968	Rubí	Yolanda Vargas Dulché	Valentín Pimstein	
222	1968	Simplemente vivir	Raúl Astor	Raúl Astor	
223	1968	Tiempo de perdón	José Morris	Xavier Rojas	
224	1968	Tres vidas distintas	Kenya Perea	Elizabeth Dupeyrón	

== 1969 ==
#	Year	Title	Author	Director	Ref.
225	1969	Aventuras de Huck	Luis Lara	Fernando Pacheco	
226	1969	Cadenas de angustia	Magda Guzmán	Valentín Pimstein	
227	1969	El ciego	Mimí Bechelani	Julio Alemán	
228	1969	Concierto de almas	Carlos Lozana Dana	Germán Robles	
229	1969	Corazón de dos ciudades	Herbert Wallace	Julián Bravo	
230	1969	Del altar a la tumba	José Gálvez	Anita Blanch	
231	1969	De la tierra a la luna	Carlos Ancira	Luis Gimeno	
232	1969	De turno con la angustia	Raúl Astor	Raúl Astor	
233	1969	El diario de una señorita decente	Luz María Servín	Ernesto Alonso	
234	1969	Encadenados	Ofelia Montesco	Raúl Farell	
235	1969	La familia	Gabriel Guerrero	Valentín Pimstein	
236	1969	La frontera de cristal	Beatriz Aguirre	Gonzalo Correa	
237	1969	Honor y orgullo	Pedro Armendáriz Jr.	Otto Sirgo	
238	1969	Lo que no fue	Mimí Bechelani	José Gálvez	
239	1969	Más allá de la muerte	Carlos Lozana Dana	Ernesto Alonso	
240	1969	Mi amor por ti	Guadalupe Dueñas	Ernesto Alonso	
241	1969	No creo en los hombres	Caridad Bravo Adams	Ernesto Alonso	
242	1969	El ojo de vidrio	Carmelita González	David Reynoso	
243	1969	Una plegaria en el camino	Arturo Moya Grau	Valentín Pimstein	
244	1969	Puente de amor	Marissa Garrido	Ernesto Alonso	
245	1969	El retrato de Dorian Gray	Oscar Wilde	Ernesto Alonso	
246	1969	Rosario	Arturo Moya Grau	Valentín Pimstein	
247	1969	El ruiseñor mexicano	Antonio Monsell	Rafael Banquells	
248	1969	Secreto para tres	Jacqueline Andere	Francisco Jambrina	
249	1969	Sin palabras	Carlos Lozano Dana	Ernesto Alonso	
250	1969	Tú eres mi destino	Lupita Ferrer	Ana Martín	
251	1969	El usurero	Benito Pérez Galdós	Alejandro Ciangherotti	
