= Alicia Montoya =

Mexican actress

- Born: Alicia Rodríguez Montoya; January 25, 1920; Mexico City, Mexico
- Died: August 17, 2002 (aged 82); Mexico City, Mexico
- Children: Amparo de Dios
- Parent(s): Julio César Rodríguez del Río; María Tereza Montoya
- Relatives: María Teresa Mondragón Montoya (half-sister)

Alicia Montoya (born Alicia Rodríguez Montoya; January 25, 1920 – August 17, 2002) was a Mexican actress of film, theatre, and television. The daughter of the stage actress María Tereza Montoya, she appeared in around sixty films and more than eighty telenovelas over a long career, among them Senda prohibida (1958), the first telenovela produced in Mexico. A veteran character actress, she received an Ariel Award nomination for Best Supporting Actress for her role in the film De muerte natural (1996).

== Early life and death ==
Montoya was born on January 25, 1920, in the Tepito neighbourhood of Mexico City. Her father was the Spanish actor and director Julio César Rodríguez del Río, and through her mother's second marriage, to the director Ricardo Mondragón Roldán, she had a younger maternal half-sister, the actress María Teresa Mondragón Montoya. She was a granddaughter of Felipe Montoya y Alarcón and a niece of the actor Joaquín Pardavé, and began performing at the age of six, making her stage debut in the play Lo que ella no pudo prever.

She was active in the actors' union, the Asociación Nacional de Actores (ANDA), throughout her career; in the union's March 1978 leadership elections she stood as a candidate on the Planilla Verde slate, headed by the actor Jorge Russek, for a seat on its honour and justice commission. She was among the actresses involved in the union's Estancia Infantil, a children's daycare centre established under Dolores del Río in 1973, contributing over five hundred hours of volunteer service in its first year. She died in Mexico City on August 17, 2002, at the age of 82. She was buried in the Panteón Jardín in Mexico City, in the section of the ANDA, where her mother also rests.

== Career ==
=== Film ===
Montoya made her film debut in La Zandunga (1937) and appeared in around sixty films. Among her most notable screen roles were those in Historia de un abrigo de mink (Emilio Gómez Muriel, 1955), El farol de la ventana (Juan Orol, 1958), and Chicas casaderas (Alfredo B. Crevenna, 1961). She also appeared in Fernando Méndez's El vampiro (1957), a foundational film of the Mexican horror genre, as María Teresa, the aunt who ultimately destroys the vampire by driving a stake through his heart. The film historian Abraham Castillo Flores has singled out her climactic scene, describing her character as a devout woman, disbelieved by others about the vampire, who kills the vampiress in a fit of rage. Later in her career she played the director of a girls' school in Sergio Véjar's Discoteca es amor (1978), in a performance a reviewer described as strict and unbending. She received an Ariel Award nomination for Best Supporting Actress for the film De muerte natural (produced 1984; released 1996).

=== Radio ===
In 1950 she was among the leads of the Mexican radio version of El derecho de nacer, broadcast on XEW with Dolores del Río, Manolo Fábregas, and Eduardo Arozamena. She was also among the actresses who worked as radio voices at the station Radio Femenina.

=== Television ===
She became best known through television, which she entered in the 1950s. Building on her work with Enrique Alonso's children's theatre company Teatro del Pequeño Mundo, she was among the cast of Teatro Fantástico, the pioneering children's television program Alonso ("Cachirulo") launched in 1955. In 1958 she took part in Senda prohibida, the first telenovela produced in Mexico, and went on to appear in historic melodramas such as Más allá de la angustia and Ha llegado un extraño; the last of her roughly eighty telenovelas was Abrázame muy fuerte (2000–2001).

=== Theatre ===
On stage, Montoya worked steadily from childhood across both classical and contemporary theatre. In the late 1940s she was a leading member of her mother's company, the Compañía María Tereza Montoya, described by one critic as its "second lady", touring Latin America on a continental tour sponsored by President Miguel Alemán Valdés. In 1952 she played Doña Blanca de Padilla in Carlos Solórzano's Doña Beatriz, la sin ventura, staged by UNAM's Teatro Universitario under the direction of Max Aub at the Sala Molière, in a performance the reviewer singled out for praise.

In the early 1950s she was, with Enrique Alonso, co-director of the children's theatre company Teatro del Pequeño Mundo, appearing in its productions such as El portal de Belén (1953), in which she played the Virgin Mary, and Un viaje maravilloso (1954). Also in 1954 she performed with her mother's troupe, the Compañía María Tereza Montoya, in Jacinto Benavente's Su amante esposa at the Teatro Ideal. In 1958 she played Edith Frank in the Mexican premiere of The Diary of Anne Frank at the Teatro Jorge Negrete, a Compañía María Tereza Montoya production directed by Ricardo Mondragón in which her mother and her half-sister María Teresa Mondragón also appeared, with Pina Pellicer in the title role.

Her dramatic roles included parts in two plays by Federico García Lorca: La casa de Bernarda Alba and, as the mother, Bodas de sangre. In 1960 she played Piedad in the premiere of Hugo Argüelles's Los cuervos están de luto at the Teatro Jorge Negrete, directed by Virgilio Mariel and produced by and co-starring Carmen Montejo; the critic Rafael Solana credited her performance with changing her career from supporting roles to that of a leading actress.

She appeared in a 1962 revival of Morena clara, by Antonio Quintero and Pascual Guillén, at the Teatro de los Insurgentes alongside Amparo Rivelles, In 1963 she appeared in a revival of Rafael Solana's comedy Debiera haber obispas at the Teatro Fábregas, part of the INBA's Temporada de Oro del Teatro Mexicano, staged by the German director Hanns Anselm Perten and headed by Gloria Marín; a critic praised her professionalism and the restraint she brought to a role that could have been overplayed. In 1964 she played Åse, the mother of the title character, in José Solé's staging of Henrik Ibsen's Peer Gynt at the Teatro Hidalgo, in a performance critics praised as exemplary. In 1968 she played the countess in a revival of Dario Niccodemi's melodrama La enemiga, starring Amparo Rivelles, in a performance a critic praised warmly. In 1972 she appeared as a German housekeeper in José Cibrián's staging of the thriller Gaslight, again opposite Amparo Rivelles.

Over a career that began in childhood, she is credited with appearing in several hundred stage plays. She was also among the established stage actors who taught at the drama school of the Asociación Nacional de Actores, the Instituto Cinematográfico, Teatral y de Radiotelevisión.

== Selected filmography ==
- La Zandunga (1937)
- Historia de un abrigo de mink (1955)
- Cadena de mentiras (1955)
- Talpa (1956)
- El vampiro (1957).... María Teresa
- El farol de la ventana (1958)
- Mujeres de Fuego (1959)
- El duende y yo (1960).... Marga
- Quinceañera (1960)
- Teresa (1961).... Doña Josefina
- Chicas casaderas (1961)
- La maestra inolvidable (1969)
- Chicano (1975).... Herlinda
- Discoteca es amor (1978).... School director
- Lolo (1993)
- De muerte natural (produced 1984; released 1996).... Anciana portera

=== Telenovelas ===
- Senda prohibida (1958)
- Teresa (1959).... Mamá de Teresa
- Ha llegado un extraño (1959)
- Más allá de la angustia (1959)
- Don Bosco (also listed as San Juan Bosco, 1961)
- La actriz (1962)
- La herencia (1962)
- Doña Macabra (1963)
- La sombra del otro (1963)
- Historia de un cobarde (1964)
- El dolor de vivir (1964)
- El crisol (1964)'
- Una mujer (1965)
- La sembradora (1965)
- La mentira (1965)
- Más fuerte que tu amor (1966)
- Vértigo (1966)
- Estafa de amor (1967)
- Lo prohibido (1967)
- Deborah (1967)
- Leyendas de México (1968)
- Águeda (1968)
- Chucho el Roto (1968).... Doña Luisa
- Rubí (1968).... Refugio
- Puente de amor (1969)
- No creo en los hombres (1969)
- Sin palabras (1969).... Elise
- La constitución (1970).... Lola Jiménez y Muro
- Velo de novia (1971)
- Muchacha italiana viene a casarse (1971).... Teresa #2
- Entre brumas (1973).... Sarah
- Los miserables (1974).... Madre Abadesa
- Barata de primavera (1975).... Nana Licha
- Pobre Clara (1975).... Tía Emilia
- Donde termina el camino (1978)
- Ángel Guerra (1979)
- Honrarás a los tuyos (1979)
- El Enemigo (1979)
- La llama de tu amor (1979)
- Herencia maldita (1986).... Catherine
- El engaño (1986).... Martha
- Victoria (1987).... Esperanza
- Quinceañera (1987).... Licha
- Amor de nadie (1990).... Anna
- Valentina (1993).... Bertha
- Clarisa (1993).... Casilda
- Retrato de familia (1995).... Nana Candelaria
- Imperio de cristal (1995).... Antonia Arizmendi
- Bendita mentira (1996).... Virtudes
- La culpa (1996).... Manuela
- Pueblo chico, infierno grande (1997).... Doña Hipólita
- Gotita de amor (1998).... Trini
- Serafín (1999).... Cruz
- Abrázame muy fuerte (2000-2001).... Gumersinda Montes
