= Antonio Medellín =

Mexican actor (1934–2017)

- Born: 15 April 1934; Mexico City, Mexico
- Died: 18 June 2017 (aged 83); Mexico City, Mexico
- Occupation: Actor
- Years active: 1962–2017

Antonio Medellín (15 April 1934 – 18 June 2017) was a Mexican film and television actor. He was known for his roles in the telenovelas Muchachitas and Rubí. In film, he was known for his role in the 1982 drama Mexican film Aquel famoso Remington. He was born in Mexico City, Mexico. His career lasted from 1962 until his death in 2017.

== Death ==
Medellín died on 18 June 2017 at a hospital in Mexico City at the age of 83.

== Filmography ==
Title	Year	Role	Notes
El profesor Valdez	1962	Unknown role	3 episodes
Las troyanas	1963	Menelao	
Gran teatro	1963–1964	Unknown role	7 episodes
Siempre tuya	1964	Unknown role	TV series
El dolor de vivir	1964	Unknown role	3 episodes
Juan José	1964	Unknown role	TV series
Los tres farsantes	1965	Gonzalo	(episode El heroe)
Casa de huéspedes	1965	Unknown role	TV series
Vértigo	1966	Unknown role	3 episodes
El ídolo	1966	Unknown role	3 episodes
Su Excelencia	1967	Embajador de Karamba	
Arrullo de Dios	1967	Detective de policía	Uncredited
Atormentada	1967	Unknown role	3 episodes
Blue Demon destructor de espias	1968		
Rubí	1968	Alejandro del Villar	53 episodes
Los Caudillos	1968	Guerrero	3 episodes
Águeda	1968	Unknown role	3 episodes
Secreto para tres	1969	Unknown role	1 episode
Del altar a la tumba	1969	Perro	3 episodes
La Gata	1970	Damián Reyes	3 episodes
La constitución	1970	Unknown role	3 episodes
Pubertinaje	1970		(segment "Una cena de navidad")
La recogida	1971	Luis	34 episodes
Aquí está Felipe Reyes	1972	Unknown role	72 episodes
El milagro de vivir	1975	Unknown role	TV series
Yo no pedí vivir	1977	César	3 episodes
María José	1978	Unknown role	3 episodes
La trampa	1978	Gastón	1 episode
Viviana	1978	Roberto	1 episode
Mamá solita	1980		
Caminemos	1980	Unknown role	3 episode
Quiéreme siempre	1981	Unknown role	3 episode
Missing	1982	Rojas' Assistant	
Aquel famoso Remington	1982	Coronel	
Vanessa	1982	Father Tomás	3 episode
Bodas de odio	1983	Francisco	3 episode
Esperándote	1985	Federico	160 episodes
El padre Gallo	1986	Víctor	97 episodes
Senda de gloria	1987	Luis	2 episodes
¿Nos traicionará el presidente?	1988		
Las grandes aguas	1989	Unknown role	85 episodes
El hijo de Lamberto Quintero	1990		
Ángeles blancos	1990	Dr. Cardoso	109 episodes
Muchachitas	1991	Alfredo Flores	3 episodes
El vuelo del águila	1994	Felipe Berriozábal	1 episode
María la del Barrio	1995	Dr. Carreras	1 episode
La antorcha encendida	1996	Amo Torres	1 episode
La jaula de oro	1997	Omar García	70 episodes
Ramona	2000	Don Pablo de Asís	1 episode
María Belén	2001	Refugio	1 episode
Niña amada mía	2003	Pascual Criollo	
Amarte es mi pecado	2004	Heriberto Reyes	1 episode
Rubí	2004	Ignacio Cárdenas	1 episode
Rubí, la descarada	2004	Ignacio Cárdenas	Television film
Barrera de amor	2005	Octavio Mendoza	3 episode
Contra viento y marea	2005	Faustino	1 episode
Sexo y otros secretos	2007	Don Tomás	Episode: "Deséame"
Fuego en la sangre	2008	Abuelo Fabio	4 episode
Mi pecado	2009	Modesto	105 episodes
Cuando me enamoro	2010–2011	Isidro del Valle	88 episodes
La fuerza del destino	2011	Unknown role	Episode: "Gran final: Part 2"
Como dice el dicho	2011	Heriberto	2 episodes
Porque el amor manda	2012–2013	Don Pánfilo	Recurring role, 182 episodes
Por siempre mi amor	2013	Rodolfo	Recurring role, 17 episodes
The Stray Cat	2014	Director de Cárcel	Guest role, 12 episodes
Que te perdone Dios	2015	Padre Francisco	Recurring role, 15 episodes
Lo imperdonable	2015	Juez	Guest role, 4 episodes
Tres veces Ana	2016	Isidro	Recurring role, 21 episodes, (final appearance)
