= Ernesto Alonso filmography =

This article presents the filmography of Mexican actor Ernesto Alonso.

== Films ==
Title	Year	Role	Notes	Ref(s)
Papacito lindo	1939		Uncredited	
La gallina clueca	1941	Roberto	Uncredited	
Historia de un gran amor	1942	Sacristán		
La virgen que forjó una patria	1942	Ignacio Allende		
El padre Morelos	1943			
El jorobado	1943	Felipe de Gonzaga		
El globo de Cantolla	1943			
La corte de faraón	1944	Micerino		
Marina	1945	Pascual		
El jagüey de las ruinas	1945			
El monje blanco	1945	Fray Can		
La pajarera	1945	Bernardo		
Bodas trágicas	1946	Octavio		
La mujer de todos	1946	Carlos		
Crimen en la alcoba	1946	Federico Alarcón		
El gallero	1948	Trinidad		
El precio de la gloria	1949	Alberto Reyes		
La dama del velo	1949	Cristobal Gómez Peña		
Felipe de Jesús	1949	Felipe de las Casas		
Otra primavera	1950	Arturo Montesinos		
Las joyas del pecado	1950			
Mala hembra	1950			
Los olvidados	1950	La voz al comienzo de la película	Uncredited	
Trotacalles	1951	Rodolfo		
La mujer sin lágrimas	1951	Carlos		
El puerto de los siete vicios	1951	El mirlo		
Un príncipe de la iglesia	1952			
Mujer de medianoche	1952			
La cobarde	1953	Arturo		
Abismos de pasión	1953	Eduardo		
Reportaje	1953	Doctor		
Orquídeas para mi esposa	1954	Ricardo del Río		
A Doll's House	1954	Eduardo Anguiano		
Una mujer en la calle	1955	José Luis		
Maternidad imposible	1955			
Ensayo de un crimen	1955	Archibaldo de la Cruz		
Con quién andan nuestras hijas	1956	Don Eduardo Ríos		
Coronación	1976	Andrés Avalos		
El maleficio	1986	Enrique de Martino		

== Television ==
Title	Year	Role	Notes	Ref(s)
Cartas de amor	1960			
Niebla	1961			
La leona	1961			
Las momias de Guanajuato	1962			
La cobarde	1962	Arturo		
Tres caras de mujer	1963	Claudio	Lead role	
Las modelos	1963	Emilio	Lead role	
Maximiliano y Carlota (telenovela)	1965			
Cristina Guzmán	1966	Gabriel		
Leyendas de México	1968			
Puente de amor	1969			
Más allá de la muerte	1969	Octavio Durán	Main Antagonist	
Cartas sin destino	1973	Marcelo		
La tierra	1974	Don Antonio	Main Antagonist	
Mundos opuestos	1976	Claudio de la Mora	Lead role	
Corazón salvaje	1977	Narrator		
Pecado de amor	1978	Miguel Ángel	Main Antagonist	
Aprendiendo a amar	1980	César	Lead role	
El maleficio	1983	Enrique de Martino	Lead role	
Lo blanco y lo negro	1989	Ángel de Castro / Silvio de Castro	Lead role	
Televiteatros	1993			
Bajo un mismo rostro	1995	Melchor		
Abrázame muy fuerte	2000	Padre Bosco		
Entre el amor y el odio	2002	Padre Abad		

== Other works ==
Title	Year	Director	Producer	Director
Murallas blancas	1960	✗	✓	✗
La mujer dorada	1960	✗	✓	✗
La casa del odio	1960	✓	✓	✗
Espejo de sombras	1960	✓	✓	✗
El otro	1960	✓	✗	✗
Dos caras tiene el destino	1960	✓	✓	✗
