= Leyendas de México =

- Genre: Telenovela
- Written by: Hugo Argüelles; Inés Arredondo
- Country of origin: Mexico
- Original language: Spanish

Original release
- Network: Telesistema Mexicano
- Release: 1968

Leyendas de México, is a Mexican telenovela produced by Televisa and originally transmitted by Telesistema Mexicano.

== Cast ==
- Jacqueline Andere
- Guillermo Aguilar
- Carlos Bracho
- Pilar Sen
- Malena Doria
- Angélica María
- Enrique Lizalde
- Augusto Benedico
- Miguel Manzano
- Luis Gimeno
- Alicia Montoya
- Elsa Aguirre
- Hortensia Santoveña
- Ricardo Mondragón
- Socorro Avelar
- Daniel Villagrán
- Armando Acosta
- Blanca de Lyz
- Héctor Carlos Flores
- Ernesto Alonso
- Blanca Sánchez
- Fernando Mendoza
- Celia Manzano
- José Alonso
- José Baviera
- Miguel Macía
- Miguel Suárez
- Emily Cranz
- Lorenzo de Rodas
- Carlos Ancira
- Emma Roldán
- Raúl Dantes
- Felipe Gil
- Ada Carrasco
- Eduardo Alcaraz
- René Molina
- Julia Marichal
