= Maria Rojo filmography =

María Rojo is a Mexican actress and politician. She was born in Mexico City. Rojo began her career in Mexico, with a role on Teatro Fantástico TV series, before starring in films, such as: Las poquianchis, in 1976; Rojo amanecer, in 1989; El callejón de los milagros, in 1995; El Infierno, in 2010.

She also participated in the successful telenovelas, such as: Cuando llega el amor in 1990, La antorcha encendida in 1996 (in which she played the role of Josefa Ortiz de Dominguez, Te Sigo Amando in 1996, Alborada in 2005-2006, Mañana es para siempre in 2008-2009, Corazón Salvaje in 2009-2010 and she returns to the telenovela in 2014, Hasta el fin del mundo. Rojo also participated in Mexican TV series such as: Mujeres Asesinas in 2008-2010, and Gritos de Muerte y Libertad in 2010, and in many theatre plays.

After establishing a successful career as an actress, Maria Rojo began her political career as member of Party of the Democratic Revolution, where she has held very important political positions. She is a member of the Senate of Mexico.

== Television ==
TV Series
Year	Series	Role	Notes	Ref
2008-Today	Mujeres Asesinas: "Jessica Toxica"; "Emilia, cocinera"; "Las Cotuchas, empresarias"	Emma Esteban; Emilia Domínguez; Milagros Quezada		
2010	Gritos de Muerte y Libertad: "El fin de la clandestinidad"	Madre indigena		

Telenovelas
Year	Telenovela	Role	Notes	Ref
1962	El Profesor Valdez			
1963	Vivimos en una estrella			
1965	Casa de huéspedes			
1971	Pequeñeces			
1973	Mi Rival	Rosenda		
1974	Los Miserables	Eponina		
1975	Ven Conmigo	Angélica Gutíerrez		
1975	Acompañame	Martha		
1978	No todo lo que brilla es oro			
1978	Amor Prohibido			
1979	Añoranza			
1981	Nosotras las mujeres	Ana		
1986	Hora Marcada			
1990	Cuando Llega el Amor	Rosa		
1991	Muchachitas	Esperanza Fernandez		
1992	Lo Blanco y lo Negro	Andrea		
1994	Buscando el paraíso	Luisa		
1996	La Antorcha Encendida	Josefa Ortíz de Domínguez		
1996	Te Sigo Amando	Felipa		
1998	El Amor de mi Vida	Sagrario Verti		
2000	Ellas, inocentes o culpables	Martha		
2001	Lo que callamos las mujeres			
2002	La duda	Amelia		
2003 - 2004	Mariana de la noche	Lucrecia Vargas		
2005 - 2006	Alborada	Victoria Mansera de Oviedo		
2008 - 2009	Mañana Es Para Siempre	Soledad Cruz		
2009 - 2010	Corazón Salvaje	Clemencia		
2014	Hasta el fin del mundo	Guadalupe Sanchez		
2025	Amanecer	Prudencia Morales		

== Filmography ==
Year	Film	Role	Notes
1956	Besos prohibidos		
1969	Los recuerdos del porvenir		
1973	El castillo de la pureza		
1973	Los Cachorros		
1974	Lo Mejor de Teresa	Carmen	
1974	Candy Stripe Nurses	Marisa Valdez	U.S. production
1975	El apando	Meche	
1976	Las Poquianchis	Lupe	
1977	Idilio		
1978	Nuevo Mundo		
1978	Naufragio	Leticia	
1979	María de mi Corazón	Maria Torres López	
1979	La Hermana Enemiga		
1981	Complot Petróleo: La Cabeza de la Hidra		
1982	La Víspera		
1982	Confidencias	Anastacia	
1983	Las apariencias engañan		
1983	Bajo La Metralla	Maria	
1984	Desde El Cristal Con Que Se Mire		
1984	El Corazón De La Noche	Interprete	
1985	Viaje Al Paraíso	Quela	
1986	Me Llaman La Chata Aguayo		
1986	Las Inocentes		
1986	Astucia		
1986	Robachicos		
1987	Los Confines		
1987	Zapata en Chinameca		
1987	Greene, Los Caminos Del Poder y La Gloria		
1987	Lo Que Importa Es Vvir	Chabela	
1988	El Otro Crimen		
1988	Break of Dawn	Maria	U.S. production
1988	Día De Muertos		
1989	Rojo Amanecer	Alicia	
1989	Coraçao Vagabundo		Brazilian production
1989	Intimidades De Un Cuarto De Baño	Esperanza	
1990	Morir En El Golfo	Conchita	
1990	La sombra del ciprés es alargada		co-production with Spain
1991	Vai Trabalhar, Vagabundo II		
1991	Infamia		
1991	La leyenda de una máscara		
1991	El extensionista	Guera	
1991	Triste recuerdo	Esperanza Gómez	
1991	Danzón	Julia Solórzano	
1991	La tarea	'Virginia', Maria	
1992	El chupes		
1992	La casa de los cuchillos		
1992	Al caer la noche		
1992	Tequila		
1992	La tarea prohibida		
1993	Las mil y una aventuras del metro		
1992	Móvil pasional		Venezuelan production
1993	Otoñal		
1993	Encuentro inesperado		
1994	La señorita		
1994	Amor que mata		
1995	El callejón de los milagros	Doña Cata	
1996	La mudanza		
1996	De muerte natural		
1996	Salón México	Mercedes	
1996	¿Por qué nosotros no?	Nun	
1996	Los vuelcos del corazón		
1996	Danske Piger Viser Alt		Denmark and Canada co-production
1996	Doble indemnización	Paulina	
1997	Alta tensión	Paulina	
1997	Reencuentros	Soledad	
1997	De noche vienes, Esmeralda	Esmeralda Loyden	
1997	Reclusorio	Gloria Castro	
1999	Crónica de un desayuno	Luz María	
1999	Perfume de violetas	Madre de Yessica	
2002	Demasiado amor	Tía Greta	
2004	El edén	Magda	
2004	El misterio de los almendros	Doña Josefina	
2005	Momento extraño	Abuela	
2005	Dos auroras		
2006	Un mundo maravilloso	Comadre Chismosa 1	
2007	La misma luna	Reina	
2008	El garabato		
2008	Todos hemos pecado	La Perfidia	
2010	El atentado	Madre de Arroyo	
2010	El Infierno	Doña Mari Reyes	
2014	The Hours with You	Julieta	
