= El engaño =

Mexican telenovela

- Genre: Telenovela; Romance; Drama
- Created by: Caridad Bravo Adams
- Written by: Fernanda Villeli
- Directed by: Sergio Jiménez
- Starring: Erika Buenfil; Frank Moro; Sergio Jiménez; Luz María Jerez; Guillermo García Cantú; Rafael Sánchez Navarro; Eduardo Alcaraz
- Opening theme: El engaño by Erika Buenfil
- Country of origin: Mexico
- Original language: Spanish
- No. of episodes: 130

Production
- Executive producer: Ernesto Alonso
- Production locations: Valle de Bravo, Mexico; Mexico City, Mexico
- Cinematography: Carlos Guerra Villareal
- Running time: 21-22 minutes
- Production company: Televisa

Original release
- Network: Canal de las Estrellas
- Release: March 21 – September 26, 1986

Related
- Estafa de amor (1961); Estafa de amor (1968); Laberintos de pasión (1999); Corazón que miente (2016)

El engaño (English title:The deception) is a Mexican telenovela produced by Ernesto Alonso for Televisa in 1986. It is an original story by Caridad Bravo Adams, adapted by Fernanda Villeli and directed by Sergio Jiménez.

Erika Buenfil, Frank Moro and Guillermo García Cantú starred as protagonists, while Sergio Jiménez and Luz María Jerez starred as main antagonists.

== Plot ==
In Valle de Bravo, Alfonso and his wife Aminta lead a hermit life. Alfonso has good reasons for this: and hiding his Nazi past and present criminal filled with links to neo-Nazi groups. Aminta who adores her husband, ignores these facts and suffers because his health was broken following the birth of his daughter Mindy. Jorge the painter, a resident of Alfonso, finds an abandoned baby and decides to take Amanta to look after her.

This infuriates Alfonso, who is awaiting the arrival of his orphaned nephews who come to live with him and forces his wife to get rid of the girl. Jorge decides to adopt her and puts Marcela. Aminta health deteriorates and eventually dies of cardiac arrest. They spend 18 years, and Alfonso remains linked to his Nazi activities. His daughter Mindy is a capricious and cruel girl who likes to flirt with her cousins. Rodrigo, the youngest of them falls for her and then making love believes to be married.

However both Alfonso and Mindy prefer her to marry Gerardo's brother Rodrigo, a strange guy, medium and neurotic suffering from constant blackouts after which he does not remember where he was or what he did. Meanwhile, Marcela over the years has become a beautiful young, but very self-conscious. Jorge travels to Miami where she is studying to attend their prom. Jorge has big plans for her. Gerardo also travels to Miami and coincides with Marcela, both fall in love at first sight. After a short courtship marry and return to Valle del Bravo.

His arrival coincides with that of David, a frail old Jew, who arrives with her child nurses seeking his son left 18 years ago. This child is being Marcela, and it turns out that the seemingly defenseless David is a survivor of Nazi concentration camps that aims to expose Alfonso.

== Cast ==
- Erika Buenfil as Marcela Estévez
- Frank Moro as Jorge Estévez
- Sergio Jiménez as Alfonso Gunther/Dieter Von Heune
- Luz María Jerez as Aminta Alvírez de Gunther/Mindy Gunther
- Guillermo García Cantú as Gerardo
- Rafael Sánchez Navarro as Rodrigo
- Eduardo Alcaraz as David Letterman
- Carmen Montejo as Doña Selene
- Susana Alexander as Elena
- Rafael Amador as Lt. Quintanilla
- Socorro Avelar as Chuy
- Yolanda Ciani as Clara
- Gabriela Goldsmith as Rocío Peña
- Gilberto Román as Javier Peña
- Jorge del Campo as Franz
- Mónica Miguel as Carmen
- Carlos Gajardo as Rubén
- Toño Infante as Lt. Rómulo Sánchez
- Marcela Páez as Adela Sánchez
- Jerardo as Samuel
- Rosita Salazar as Alice
- José D'Merlo as Thomas/Sammy
- René Escandón as Renato
- César Adrián Sánchez as Carlos
- José Carlos Teruel as Isaac
- Rafael Rojas as Reynaldo
- Xavier Masse as Rogers
- Marco Hernández as Tony Suárez
- Alicia Montoya as Martha
- Norma Reyes as Alma
- Edgardo Gazcón as Fernando
- Mariana Gaja as Marcela (child)
- Tenderly Prats as Mindy (child)
- Tanya Pelejero as Rocío (child)
- Graciela Galicia as Operator
- Pedro Zavala as Father
- Felipe González as Doctor
- Ricardo Rivero as Judge
- Rubén Díaz as Chauffeur
- Fernando Manzano as Announcer
- Enrique Borja Baena
- Rolando Barral
- Rebeca Silva
