= Eugenia (TV series) =

- Genre: Telenovela
- Country of origin: Mexico
- Original language: Spanish

Original release
- Network: Telesistema Mexicano
- Release: 1963

Eugenia is a Mexican telenovela produced by Televisa for Telesistema Mexicano in 1963.

== Cast ==
- Miguel Manzano
- Maricruz Olivier - Eugenia
- Hortensia Santoveña
- Bertha Moss
- Andrea Palma
- Celia Manzano
- María Eugenia Ríos
- Enrique Lizalde
- Augusto Benedico
- Jacqueline Andere
