= El ojo de vidrio =

El ojo de vidrio may refer to:

- El ojo de vidrio (film), a 1969 Mexican film
- El ojo de vidrio (telenovela), a Mexican telenovela
- Julio Alberto Castillo Rodríguez, a suspected Mexican drug lord
