= La duda (1967 TV series) =

- Genre: Telenovela
- Country of origin: Mexico
- Original language: Spanish

Original release
- Network: Telesistema Mexicano
- Release: 1967

Related
- La duda

La duda ('The Doubt') is a Mexican telenovela produced by Televisa for Telesistema Mexicano in 1967.

== Cast ==
- Joaquín Cordero
- Luz María Aguilar
- Carlos Ancira
- Pilar Sen
