= Más allá de la muerte =

Mexican telenovela

- Genre: Telenovela
- Written by: Carlos Lozana Dana
- Starring: Carlos Bracho; Julissa; Ernesto Alonso; Emily Cranz; Aaron Hernan; Hortensia Santoveña; Norma Herrera; Miguel Manzano
- Country of origin: Mexico
- Original language: Spanish

Original release
- Network: Televicentro

Más allá de la muerte, is a Mexican telenovela produced by Ernesto Alonso in 1969, this production is known as the first color telenovela produced in Mexico. His chain was Televicentro (now Televisa) and was led by Julissa and Carlos Bracho.

== Plot ==
In Puebla in the mid-19th century, pretty girl Estela Ballesteros lives ahead of her time. Because she suffers from a heart injury, the Estela Family allows her certain freedoms, such as studying art with painter Octavio Duran and sustain a romance with the reprehensible Angel Montalvan.

== Cast ==
- Julissa as Estela Ballesteros
- Carlos Bracho as Ángel Montalván
- Ernesto Alonso as Octavio Durán
- Emily Cranz as Malena
- Aarón Hernán
- Hortensia Santoveña
- Carlos Ancira as Gabriel Montalván
- Miguel Manzano as Ramón Ballesteros
- Norma Herrera as Hildegard
