= La sembradora =

Mexican telenovela

- Genre: Telenovela
- Directed by: Gabriel Guerrero
- Country of origin: Mexico
- Original language: Spanish

Production
- Executive producer: Valentín Pimstein

Original release
- Network: Telesistema Mexicano
- Release: 1965

La sembradora is a Mexican telenovela produced by Valentín Pimstein for Telesistema Mexicano in 1965.

== Cast ==
- Maricruz Olivier as Mercedes
- Rafael Llamas as Horacio
- Carlos Navarro as Eugenio
- Graciela Doring as Inés
- Patricia Morán as Amanda
- Fedora Capdevilla as Matilde
- Fernando Mendoza as Juan
- Alicia Montoya as Petra
- Gloria Estrada as Dueña de la pensión
- Alberto Galán as José
- Tara Parra as Amapola "Ama"
- Ismael Valle as Faustini
