= La sospecha =

Mexican telenovela

- Genre: Telenovela; Drama
- Starring: Carlos López Moctezuma; Patricia Morán; Tony Carbajal
- Country of origin: Mexico
- Original language: Spanish

Production
- Running time: 30 minutes

Original release
- Network: Telesistema Mexicano
- Release: 1961 – 1961

Related
- Risas amargas; La telaraña

La sospecha (English title: Suspicion) is a Mexican telenovela produced by Televisa and transmitted by Telesistema Mexicano.

Carlos López Moctezuma and Patricia Morán starred as protagonists.

== Cast ==
- Carlos López Moctezuma
- Patricia Morán
- Tony Carbajal
- Eduardo Fajardo
- Aurora Alvarado
- Nicolás Rodríguez
