= Sergio Bustamante =

Mexican actor (1934–2014)

- Born: Sergio Emilio Edgardo de Bustamante y Arteaga Roa; October 18, 1934; Mexico City, Mexico
- Died: May 22, 2014 (aged 79); Puebla, Mexico
- Occupation: Actor
- Years active: 1957-2014

Sergio Bustamante (October 18, 1934 – May 22, 2014) was a Mexican actor of telenovelas, cinema, dubbing and theater.

== Life and career ==
Born Sergio Emilio Edgardo de Bustamante y Arteaga Roa, he studied psychology in UNAM and later acted in Escuela de Arte Teatral. His debut as an actor was in El duelo by Federico S. Inclán. His debut in cinema was Una golfa in 1957 with Silvia Pinal.

With Los Spyders, he recorded "La fiesta magna", and he was a member of Sergio & Los Lunáticos. Bustamante also worked with Los Teen Tops.

In addition, Bustamante was the voice of Harvey Korman for the Spanish version of The Carol Burnett Show.

He died in Puebla, Mexico on May 22, 2014, from a heart attack at the age of 79.

== Filmography ==
=== Film ===
- Ama a tu prójimo (1958) .... Ángel Martinelli / Soto
- Una golfa (1958) .... Luis
- Lágrimas de amor (1959)
- Vuelta al paraíso (1960) .... Doroteo
- Siguiendo pistas (1960)
- La tórtola del Ajusco (1962)
- El tejedor de milagros (1962) .... Teófilo
- La sombra de los hijos (1964) .... Mario
- Un hombre en la trampa (1965) .... Esposo de Cristina
- La recta final (1966) .... Gato
- Valentín Armienta el vengador (1969)
- Todo por nada (1969) .... Johnny
- El principio (1973) .... Don Pancho
- En busca de un muro (1974) .... Narrador
- La odisea de los muñecos (1975) .... (voice)
- Un mulato llamado Martín (1975)
- Espejismo de la ciudad (1976) .... Lorenzo Rojas
- El caballito volador (1982) .... Don Abusivo
- Mercenarios de la muerte (1983) .... Kan Jen Mercenario
- Las glorias del gran Púas (1984)
- El rey de oros (1984) .... Don Marcos
- Mientras México duerme (1986) .... Gil
- Veneno para las hadas (1986) .... Flavia's Father (voice)
- Robachicos (1986)
- Su destino era matar (1988)
- Ratas de vecindad (1988)
- Durazo, la verdadera historia (1988)
- Santa sangre (1989) .... Monseñor
- Jóvenes delincuentes (1989)
- Fiesta de sangre (1989)
- Bonampak (1989)
- Orgía de terror (1990)
- Los demonios del desierto (1990)
- La tómbola de la muerte (1990)
- La mujer judicial (1990)
- Justiciero callejero (1990)
- Agua roja (1990)
- One Man's War (1991, TV Movie) .... Gomes
- Perseguida (1991) .... Hermenegildo Parra
- Secreto sangriento (1991) .... Don Rodolfo
- Descendiente de asesinos (1991) .... José Guzmán
- Playa azul (1992) .... Ingeniero
- Perros de presa (1992)
- Vampiro, guerrero de la noche (1993)
- Bosque de muerte (1993) .... Padre de Silvia
- Memoria del cine mexicano (1993) .... Él mismo
- Sin retorno (1995)
- Dioses del México antiguo (1996) .... Narrador
- Pamela por amor (2008)
- El mar muerto (2009) .... Cura
- Mi vida por ti (2009)
- Catarsis (2010, Short) .... El Padre
- Acapulco La vida va (2017) .... Justo (final film role)

=== Telenovelas ===
TV Azteca

- La calle de las novias (1999) .... Luis Cardozo
- Cuando seas mía (2001) .... Juan Francisco Sánchez Zambrano
- La duda (2002) .... Adolfo
- La heredera (2004)
- Alma legal (2008) .... Manuel
- Noche eterna (2008) .... Don Sebastián
- Quiéreme (2010) .... Victorio Dorelli
- Emperatriz (2011) .... Justo del Real (Main Villain, father of Emperatriz)
- A corazón abierto (2012) .... Silvestre Ramírez (Special appearance in episode 107)

Televisa

- Espejo de sombras (1960)
- Cartas de amor (1960)
- Las momias de Guanajuato (1962)
- Lo prohibido (1967)
- Detrás del muro (1967)
- Las víctimas (1967)
- Incertidumbre (1967)
- Aurelia (1968)
- Fallaste corazón (1968) .... Alfonso
- Rosario (1969)
- Cadenas de angustia (1969)
- La gata (1970) .... Mariano Martínez Negrete
- Cosa juzgada (1970)
- La constitución (1970)
- Aquí está Felipe Reyes (1972)
- Los miserables (1974) .... Jean Valjean
- Mundos opuestos (1976)
- Los bandidos del río frío (1976) .... Relumbrón
- Un original y veinte copias (1978) .... Legorreta
- El amor llegó más tarde (1979)
- Infamia (1981) .... David Montalvo
- Cenizas y diamantes (1990) .... Dámaso Gallardo
- Buscando el paraíso (1993) .... Marcelo
- Agujetas de color de rosa (1994) .... Gino
- La antorcha encendida (1996) .... Virrey José de Iturrigaray
- El Canal de las Estrellas (1991 - 1997) .... Main announcer for XEW TV in Mexico and Galavisión in Europe

=== TV series ===
- I Dream of Jeannie (Latin American dub) (1965- 1970) .... Roger Healey
- De par en par (1986)
- Hora marcada (1986)
- Visión real (1998) .... Presentador-Narrador
- Historias de ellos para ellas (2003)
- Ni una vez más (2006) .... Dante Villaseñor
- La niñera (2007) .... Billy Corcuera

=== Theater ===
- El cántaro roto
- Los gallos salvajes
- Tamara
- Anita la huerfanita
- Los chicos de la banda
- Israfel
- Un sombrero de paja de Italia
- La vida es sueño
- El alquimista
- Muchacha de campo
- Calígula
- Los intereses creados
