= La tormenta (1967 TV series) =

- Genre: Telenovela
- Created by: Miguel Sabido; Eduardo Lizalde
- Directed by: Raúl Araiza; Ernesto Alonso
- Theme music composer: Nino Rota
- Country of origin: Mexico
- Original language: Spanish
- No. of episodes: 91

Production
- Executive producer: Miguel Alemán Velasco

Original release
- Network: Telesistema Mexicano
- Release: 1967

La tormenta is a Mexican telenovela produced by Miguel Alemán Velasco for Telesistema Mexicano in 1967.

== Cast ==
- Ignacio López Tarso as General Gabriel Paredes
- Columba Domínguez as Lorenza
- Amparo Rivelles as Lydia de Paredes
- Anita Blanch as Ana Valenzuela
- Maricruz Olivier as Lorenza "Loren" Paredes
- Enrique Lizalde as Gabriel Felipe Paredes
- Daniela Rosen as Cecilia Paredes
- José Carlos Ruiz as Benito Juárez
- Gerardo del Castillo as Ignacio Comonfort
- Jorge Mondragón as Melchor Ocampo
- Carlos Bracho as Teniente Fernández
- Andrea López as Doña Lucha Morán
- Fernando Mendoza as General Parodi
- Jorge Arvizu as Francisco I. Madero
- Luis Manuel Pelayo as Gustavo A. Madero
- Marina Marín as Dalia García
- Rosario Gálvez as Carmen Cerdán
- Raúl Dantes as Guillermo Prieto
- Aarón Hernán as Armando
- Luis Bayardo as Antonio
- Miguel Manzano as Don Alfonso
- Blanca Sánchez as Ángela
- Emily Kranz
- Mario Cid as Ignacio Zaragoza
- Lupelena Goyeneche
- Eduardo McGregor
- Héctor Sáez
- Guillermo Aguilar
- Julia Marichal
