= Traicionera (TV series) =

- Genre: Telenovela
- Country of origin: Mexico
- Original language: Spanish

Original release
- Network: Telesistema Mexicano
- Release: 1963

Traicionera is a Mexican telenovela produced by Televisa for Telesistema Mexicano in 1963.

== Cast ==
- Anita Blanch
- Luis Aragón
- Maruja Grifell
- José Gálvez
- Rita Macedo
- Maricruz Olivier
