= Encadenados =

Encadenados may refer to:

- Encadenados (song), a 1998 song by Chavela Vargas featuring Miguel Bosé
- Encadenados (1969 TV series), a Mexican telenovela
- Encadenados (1988 TV series), a Mexican telenovela
