= El usurero =

- Genre: Telenovela
- Country of origin: Mexico
- Original language: Spanish

Original release
- Network: Telesistema Mexicano

El usurero, is a 1969 Mexican telenovela produced by Televisa and originally transmitted by Telesistema Mexicano.

== Cast ==
- Luis Bayardo
- Alejandro Ciangherotti
- Andrea Cotto
- Carlos Fernández
