= Las momias de Guanajuato =

- Genre: Telenovela; Drama
- Directed by: Ernesto Alonso
- Starring: Ernesto Alonso; Amparo Rivelles; Carmen Montejo; Columba Domínguez; Jacqueline Andere; Marga López
- Country of origin: Mexico
- Original language: Spanish

Production
- Executive producer: Ernesto Alonso
- Running time: 30 minutes

Original release
- Network: Telesistema Mexicano
- Release: 1962 – 1962

Related
- Vida robada; La actriz

Las momias de Guanajuato (English title: The Mummies of Guanajuato) is a Mexican horror telenovela produced by Televisa and transmitted by Telesistema Mexicano.

== Cast ==
- Roberto REYES
- Amparo Rivelles — Julia Mancera
- Carmen Montejo
- Columba Domínguez
- Jacqueline Andere
- Marga López
- Ofelia Guilmáin
- Elsa Aguirre
- Jorge Martínez de Hoyos
- María Elena Marqués
- Ana Luisa Peluffo
- Sergio Bustamante — Rodrigo de Barral
- Ariadna Welter
- Alma Delia Fuentes
- Lilia Prado
- Alicia Montoya
- Guillermo Herrera
- Alida Valli
- Marilú Elizaga
- Héctor Gómez
- Aldo Monti
