= Prisionera (1962 TV series) =

- Genre: Telenovela
- Directed by: Rafael Banquells
- Country of origin: Mexico
- Original language: Spanish

Original release
- Network: Telesistema Mexicano
- Release: 1962

Prisionera is a Mexican telenovela produced by Televisa for Telesistema Mexicano in 1962.

== Cast ==
- Anita Blanch
- José Gálvez
- Maricruz Olivier
