= Secreto para tres =

Mexican telenovela

- Genre: Telenovela
- Written by: Rodrigo de la Cueva
- Directed by: Guillermo Diazayas
- Country of origin: Mexico
- Original language: Spanish
- No. of episodes: 40

Original release
- Network: Telesistema Mexicano

Secreto para tres, (English: Secret three) is a Mexican telenovela produced by Televisa and originally transmitted in 1969 by Telesistema Mexicano.

== Cast ==
- Rita Macedo
- Antonio Medellín - Le Four
- Carlos Ancira
- Tere Vale
- Mauricio Herrera
- Eduardo MacGregor
- Jorge Mondragón
- Mario Cid
- Yolanda Ciani
- Jose Peña Pepet
- Enrique Pontón
- Gustavo Bernal
