= Los medio hogares =

Mexican telenovela

- Genre: Telenovela
- Directed by: Antulio Jiménez Pons
- Starring: Carmen Montejo; Alejandro Ciangherotti
- Country of origin: Mexico
- Original language: Spanish

Original release
- Network: Telesistema Mexicano
- Release: 1966

Los medio hogares is a Mexican telenovela directed by Antulio Jiménez Pons for Telesistema Mexicano in 1966.

== Cast ==
- Carmen Montejo
- Alejandro Ciangherotti
- Irma Lozano
- Raúl Meraz
- Pilar Sen
