= Dos caras tiene el destino =

Mexican telenovela

- Genre: Telenovela; Drama
- Starring: Maricruz Olivier; Magda Guzmán; Alicia Montoya
- Country of origin: Mexico
- Original language: Spanish

Production
- Production location: Mexico City
- Running time: 42-45 minutes
- Production company: Televisa

Original release
- Network: Canal 4, Telesistema Mexicano
- Release: 1960 – 1960

Dos caras tiene el destino is a Mexican telenovela that aired on Canal 4, Telesistema Mexicano in 1960.

== Plot ==
Maricruz Olivier plays a woman with two personalities: one is Marga, a shy child and family member, and the other is Rita, a girl who likes clubs and costumes. Olivier played these characters.

== Cast ==
- Maricruz Olivier as Marga / Rita
- Magda Guzmán
- Alicia Montoya
- Aurora Molina
- José Solé
- Marco de Carlo
- Rafael Bertrand
- Rafael Llamas
- Julio Monterde
- Magda Donato
- Pilar Souza
- Armando Arriola
- Carmen Salas
- Luis Beristáin

== Production ==
- Original Story: Ernesto Alonso
- Adaptation: Ernesto Alonso
- Managing Director: José Morris
