= Juan José (TV series) =

- Genre: Telenovela
- Country of origin: Mexico
- Original language: Spanish

Original release
- Network: Telesistema Mexicano
- Release: 1964

Juan José is a Mexican telenovela produced by Televisa for Telesistema Mexicano in 1964.

== Cast ==
- Maricruz Olivier
- Narciso Busquets
- Raúl Padilla
- Antonio Medellín
