= La familia Miau =

Mexican telenovela

- Genre: Telenovela
- Starring: Eduardo Fajardo; Alejandro Ciangherotti
- Country of origin: Mexico
- Original language: Spanish

Original release
- Network: Telesistema Mexicano
- Release: 1963

La familia Miau is a Mexican telenovela produced by Televisa for Telesistema Mexicano in 1963.

== Cast ==
- Eduardo Fajardo
- Alejandro Ciangherotti
- Polo Ortín
- Nora Veryán
- Elodia Hernández
- Andrea Palma
- Magda Guzmán
- Armando Arriola
- Alberto Galán
- María Eugenia Ríos
- Óscar Morelli
- Enrique Díaz 'Indiano'
- Carlos Méndez
- Ángel Méndez
