= Un pobre hombre =

Mexican telenovela

- Genre: Telenovela
- Country of origin: Mexico
- Original language: Spanish

Original release
- Network: Telesistema Mexicano
- Release: 1967

Un pobre hombre is a Mexican telenovela produced by Teleprogramas Acapulco, SA in 1967.

== Cast ==
- Lucha Altamirano
- Héctor Andremar
- Emily Cranz
- Juan Antonio Edwards
