= La honra de vivir =

Mexican telenovela

- Genre: Telenovela
- Starring: Guillermo Zetina; Elsa Cárdenas
- Country of origin: Mexico
- Original language: Spanish

Original release
- Network: Telesistema Mexicano
- Release: 1961

La honra de vivir (English: The Glory of Living) is a Mexican telenovela produced by Televisa and broadcast by Telesistema Mexicano in 1961.

== Cast ==
- Guillermo Zetina
- Elsa Cárdenas
- Pilar Sen
- Freddy Fernández
- Alejandro Ciangherotti
