= Desencuentro =

Desencuentro may refer to:

- Desencuentro (1964 TV series), a Mexican telenovela
- Desencuentro (1997 TV series), a Mexican telenovela
- "Desencuentro" (song), a 2017 song by Residente
