= Una plegaria en el camino =

- Genre: Telenovela
- Country of origin: Mexico
- Original language: Spanish

Original release
- Network: Telesistema Mexicano

Una plegaria en el camino, (English: A prayer on the road) is a 1969 Mexican telenovela produced by Televisa and originally transmitted by Telesistema Mexicano.

== Cast ==
- Enrique Aguilar
- Carlos Ancira
- Rosalba Brambila
- Jorge Castillo
