= Sueña conmigo, Donaji =

Mexican telenovela

- Genre: Telenovela
- Created by: Marissa Garrido; Caridad Bravo Adams
- Country of origin: Mexico
- Original language: Spanish

Original release
- Network: Telesistema Mexicano
- Release: 1967

Sueña conmigo, Donaji is a Mexican telenovela produced by Televisa for Telesistema Mexicano in 1967.

== Cast ==
- Socorro Avelar as Donaji
- Héctor Andremar
- Yolanda Ciani
- Carlos Fernández
