= No creo en los hombres =

Mexican telenovela

- Genre: Telenovela
- Directed by: Pepe Morris
- Opening theme: "Los 30 Peligrosa Edad"
- Country of origin: Mexico
- Original language: Spanish

Original release
- Network: Telesistema Mexicano
- Release: February 5, 1969 – 1969

Related
- Yo no creo en los hombres (1991); Yo no creo en los hombres (2014)

No creo en los hombres (English: I Don't Believe in Men) is a Mexican telenovela produced by Televisa and originally transmitted by Telesistema Mexicano.

== Cast ==
- Maricruz Olivier as Maria Victoria
- Aarón Hernán
- Carlos Fernández
- Alicia Rodríguez as Alicia
- Anita Blanch as Leonor
- Fanny Schiller as Asuncion
- Miguel Manzano
- Alicia Montoya
