= El dolor de vivir =

Mexican telenovela

- Genre: Telenovela
- Country of origin: Mexico
- Original language: Spanish

Original release
- Network: Telesistema Mexicano
- Release: 1964

El dolor de vivir is a Mexican telenovela produced by Televisa for Telesistema Mexicano in 1964.

== Cast ==
- Héctor Gómez
- Maricruz Olivier
- Antonio Medellín
- Rafael Banquells
