= La máscara del ángel =

Mexican telenovela

- Genre: Telenovela
- Country of origin: Mexico
- Original language: Spanish
- No. of episodes: 61

Original release
- Network: Telesistema Mexicano
- Release: 1964

La máscara del ángel is a Mexican telenovela production produced by Televisa for Telesistema Mexicano in 1964.

== Cast ==
- María Rivas
- Guillermo Murray
- Patricia Morán
- Fernando Mendoza
- Jorge Mondragón
- Maruja Grifell
