= Gente sin historia =

Mexican telenovela

- Genre: Telenovela
- Country of origin: Mexico
- Original language: Spanish

Original release
- Network: Telesistema Mexicano
- Release: 1967

Gente sin historia (English: People Without History) is a Mexican telenovela produced by Televisa for Telesistema Mexicano in 1967.

== Cast ==
- Chucho Salinas
- Alma Delia Fuentes
- Rafael del Río
- Óscar Ortiz de Pinedo
