= El ruiseñor mexicano =

Mexican telenovela

- Genre: Telenovela
- Directed by: Rafael Banquells
- Country of origin: Mexico
- Original language: Spanish

Original release
- Network: Telesistema Mexicano

El ruiseñor mexicano, (English: The Mexican mockingbird) is a Mexican telenovela produced by Televisa and originally transmitted by Telesistema Mexicano.

== Cast ==
- Ernestina Garfias as Ángela Peralta
- Enrique Rambal as Agustín Balderas "Ruiseñor mexicano"
- Antonio Passy as Don Manuel Peralta
- Carmen Molina as Josefa
- Oscar Pulido as Don Sebastián
- Enrique Aguilar as Eugenio Castera
- Enrique Becker as Manuel Peralta hijo
- María Douglas as Emperatriz Carlota Amalia
- Guillermo Zarur as Marqués de Colin
- Dina de Marco as Amalia
- Ana Margarita as Claudia Cardán
