= La frontera de cristal (TV series) =

- Genre: Telenovela
- Country of origin: Mexico
- Original language: Spanish

Original release
- Network: Telesistema Mexicano

La frontera de cristal, is a 1969 Mexican telenovela produced by Televisa and originally transmitted by Telesistema Mexicano.

== Cast ==
- Beatriz Aguirre
- Gonzalo Correa
- Silvia Suárez
- Arturo Monsel
