= Bertha Moss =

Argentine actress (1919–2008)

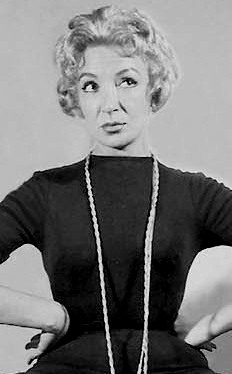
- Moss in the 1960s
- Born: Juana Bertha Moscovich Holm; August 7, 1919; Buenos Aires, Argentina
- Died: February 4, 2008 (aged 88); Buenos Aires, Argentina
- Occupation: Actress
- Writing career
- Years active: 1938–2002

Bertha Moss (August 7, 1919 – February 4, 2008), born Juana Bertha Moscovich Holm, was an Argentine actress of stage, television, appearing in many Mexican telenovelas, and film.

== Life ==
She was born in Buenos Aires, Argentina. She died February 4, 2008, in Buenos Aires.

She started her career in the cinema of her native Argentina and moved to Mexico in 1959 when she obtained a role in the telenovela El precio del cielo. Her first film in Mexico came three years later with El ángel exterminador by Luis Buñuel.

== Telenovelas ==
- Preciosa (1998) as Eduarda Santander
- María Isabel (1997) as Eugenia
- Alondra (1995)
- Los Parientes Pobres (1993) as Tía Brígida
- Amor de nadie (1990) as Victoria
- Muchachita (1986)
- Pobre juventud (1986)
- El hombre de la mandolina (1985)
- Juana Iris (1985) as Raquel
- Amor ajeno (1983) as Sara
- Extraños caminos del amor (1981)
- La divina Sarah (1980) as Simona
- Secreto de confesión (1980)
- Bella y bestia (1979)
- Cumbres borrascosas (1979)
- Muñeca rota (1978)
- Corazón salvaje (1977) as Sofía
- Mañana será otro día (1976) as Hortensia
- Paloma (1975) as Catalina
- La recogida (1971) as Matilde
- Encrucijada (1970)
- Los inconformes (1968)
- La Frontera (1967)
- Secreto de confesión (1965)
- Historia de un cobarde (1964)
- Agonia de amor (1963)
- Eugenia (1963)
- Codicia (1962)
- Niebla (1961)
- Mi esposa se divorcia (1959)
- El precio del cielo (1959)

== Films ==
=== Cinema of Argentina ===
- La Bestia humana (1957)
- El hombre virgen (1956)
- La tierra del fuego se apaga (1955)
- Mercado de abasto (1955)
- Mujeres casadas (1954)
- La Mejor del colegio (1953)
- Deshonra (1952)
- Mujeres en sombra (1951)
- La vida color de rosa (1951)
- Yo no elegí mi vida (1949)
- Story of a Bad Woman (1948)
- La serpiente de cascabel (1948) as jailer Graciela
- El hombre que amé (1947)
- Un ángel sin pantalones (1947)
- Musical Romance (1947)
- Albergue de mujeres (1946)
- Cristina (1946)
- Los Dos rivales (1944)
- El fin de la noche (1944)
- Captain Poison (1943)
- Amor último modelo (1942)
- Ceniza al viento (1942)
- Incertidumbre (1942)

=== Cinema of Mexico ===
- La Paloma de Marsella (1999)
- Barrio de campeones (1981)
- El hombre del puente (1976) as blond peasant
- La recogida (1974)
- Conserje en condominio (1974) as Candy
- Hay ángeles sin alas (1972)
- Padre nuestro que estas en la tierra (1972) as Carlota
- Apolinar (1972)
- Los corrompidos (1971) as Amanda
- La hermanita Dinamita (1970) as Angela Molina
- Persiguelas y alcanzalas (1969)
- Como perros y gatos (1969)
- No se mande, profe (1969)
- Romeo contra Julieta (1968)
- La endemoniada (1968)
- El bastardo (1968)
- Tres mil kilómetros de amor (1967)
- Arrullo de Dios (1967)
- Domingo salvaje (1967)
- La Venus maldita (1967)
- Rancho solo (1967)
- La alegría de vivir (1965)
- ¡Ay, Jalisco no te rajes! (1965)
- El Robo al tren correo (1964)
- Historia de un canalla (1964)
- Los derechos de los hijos (1963) as Bertha
- La invasión de los vampiros (1963) as Frau Hildegarde
- Mi vida es una canción (1963)
- The Bloody Vampire (1962) as Frau Hildegarde
- The Exterminating Angel (1962) as Leonora

== See also ==
- Foreign-born artists in Mexico
