= Ellas (TV series) =

Mexican telenovela

- Genre: Telenovela
- Country of origin: Mexico
- Original language: Spanish

Original release
- Network: Telesistema Mexicano
- Release: November 16, 1967

Ellas is a Mexican telenovela produced by Televisa for Telesistema Mexicano in 1967.

== Cast ==
- Hilda Aguirre
- Lourdes Baledón
- Carmen Salas
- Luis Aragón
