= Aventuras de Huck =

Mexican telenovela

- Genre: Telenovela
- Country of origin: Mexico
- Original language: Spanish

Original release
- Network: Telesistema Mexicano

Aventuras de Huck, is a Mexican telenovela produced by Televisa and originally transmitted by Telesistema Mexicano.

== Cast ==
- Luis Lara
- Fernando Pacheco
- Manolo Hernandez
- Guillermo Orea
