= Detrás del muro =

Mexican telenovela

- Genre: Telenovela
- Country of origin: Mexico
- Original language: Spanish

Original release
- Network: Telesistema Mexicano
- Release: 1967

Detrás del muro is a Mexican telenovela produced by Televisa for Telesistema Mexicano in 1967.

== Cast ==
- Alejandro Ciangherotti
- Martha Rios
- Antonio Bravo
- Patricia Morán
