= Atormentada =

Mexican telenovela

- Genre: Telenovela
- Country of origin: Mexico
- Original language: Spanish

Original release
- Network: Telesistema Mexicano
- Release: 1967

Atormentada, is a Mexican telenovela produced by Televisa and originally transmitted by Telesistema Mexicano.

== Cast ==
- Patricia Morán
- Maruja Grifell
- Enrique Aguilar
- Antonio Medellín
