= Desencuentro (1964 TV series) =

1964 Mexican telenovela

- Genre: Telenovela
- Country of origin: Mexico
- Original language: Spanish

Original release
- Network: Telesistema Mexicano
- Release: 1964

Desencuentro is a Mexican telenovela produced by Televisa for Telesistema Mexicano in 1964.

== Cast ==
- Lucha Altamirano
- Héctor Andremar
- Emily Cranz
- Juan Antonio Edwards
