= Tiempo de perdón =

- Genre: Telenovela
- Country of origin: Mexico
- Original language: Spanish

Original release
- Network: Telesistema Mexicano

Tiempo de perdón is a 1969 Mexican telenovela produced by Televisa and originally transmitted on Telesistema Mexicano.

== Cast ==
- Héctor Andremar
- Eduardo Castell
- Malena Doria
- Enriqueta Lara
