= La piel de Zapa =

Mexican telenovela

- Genre: Telenovela
- Country of origin: Mexico
- Original language: Spanish

Original release
- Network: Telesistema Mexicano
- Release: 1964

La piel de Zapa is a Mexican telenovela produced by Televisa for Telesistema Mexicano in 1964. It stars Carlos Agosti and Hector Andremar and is based on the novel La Peau de chagrin by Honoré de Balzac.

== Cast ==
- Elsa Cárdenas
- Carlos Agostí
- Elsa Cárdenas
- Antonio de Hud
