= Puente de cristal =

Mexican telenovela

- Genre: Telenovela
- Directed by: José Morris
- Country of origin: Mexico
- Original language: Spanish

Production
- Executive producer: Ernesto Alonso

Original release
- Network: Telesistema Mexicano
- Release: 1965

Puente de cristal is a Mexican telenovela produced by Ernesto Alonso for Telesistema Mexicano in 1965.

== Cast ==
- Guillermo Aguilar
- Anita Blanch
- Tony Carbajal
- Miguel Manzano
- Gloria Marín
- Andrea Palma
- Beatriz Sheridan
