= Vértigo (TV series) =

- Genre: Telenovela
- Created by: Estela Calderón
- Directed by: Antonio Fernández
- Country of origin: Mexico
- Original language: Spanish

Production
- Executive producer: Valentín Pimstein
- Cinematography: Francisco Jambrina

Original release
- Network: Telesistema Mexicano
- Release: 1966

Vértigo is a Mexican telenovela produced by Valentín Pimstein for Telesistema Mexicano in 1966.

== Cast ==
- Carlos Navarro
- Blanca Sánchez
- Alicia Montoya
- Oscar Morelli
- Virginia Gutiérrez
- Antonio Medellín
- Nancy MacKenzie
- Martha Elena Cervantes
- Francisco Jambrina
- Maggie Campos
- Queta Lavat
- Tomas I. Jaime
