= Lo prohibido =

Mexican telenovela

- Genre: Telenovela
- Country of origin: Mexico
- Original language: Spanish

Original release
- Network: Telesistema Mexicano
- Release: 1967

Lo prohibido is a Mexican telenovela produced by Televisa for Telesistema Mexicano in 1967.

== Cast ==
- Carlos Bracho
- Sergio Bustamante
- Alejandro Ciangherotti
- Manolo Garía
