= Historia de un cobarde =

Mexican telenovela

- Genre: Telenovela
- Created by: Mimí Bechelani
- Directed by: Raúl Araiza
- Starring: Héctor Gómez; Alicia Montoya; Miguel Ángel Ferriz
- Country of origin: Mexico
- Original language: Spanish
- No. of seasons: 1
- No. of episodes: 57

Production
- Executive producer: Ernesto Alonso

Original release
- Network: Telesistema Mexicano
- Release: 1964

Historia de un cobarde (English: History of a Coward) is a Mexican telenovela produced by Ernesto Alonso for Telesistema Mexicano in 1964.

Héctor Gómez and Alicia Montoya star as the protagonists, Miguel Ángel Ferriz star as the antagonist.

== Synopsis ==
The story revolves around the life of a man who must break all ties involving it to be suspect in a crime.

== Cast ==
- Héctor Gómez - Alfredo
- Alicia Montoya - Paula
- Miguel Ángel Ferriz - Pablo
- Irma Lozano - Esther
- Bertha Moss - Georgina
- Julio Monterde - Javier
- Joaquín Cordero
- Francisco Jambrina - Gilberto
- Emma Roldán
- Blanca de Castrejón
- Joaquín Roche Jr. - Santiago "Santiaguito" (niño)
- Amparo Villegas
