= La calle en que vivimos =

Mexican telenovela

- Genre: Telenovela
- Country of origin: Mexico
- Original language: Spanish

Original release
- Network: Telesistema Mexicano
- Release: 1965

La calle en que vivimos is a Mexican telenovela produced by Televisa for Telesistema Mexicano in 1965.

== Cast ==
- Andrea Palma
- Alejandro Ciangherotti
- Jaime Fernández
- Rafael Llamas
