= Más fuerte que tu amor =

Mexican telenovela series

- Genre: Telenovela
- Directed by: Ernesto Alonso
- Starring: Angélica María; Enrique Lizalde
- Opening theme: "Más fuerte que tu amor" by Angélica María
- Country of origin: Mexico
- Original language: Spanish

Production
- Executive producer: Ernesto Alonso
- Cinematography: José Morris

Original release
- Network: Telesistema Mexicano
- Release: 1966

Más fuerte que tu amor (English: Stronger Than Your love) is a Mexican telenovela produced by Ernesto Alonso for Telesistema Mexicano in 1966.

== Cast ==
- Angélica María - Alicia
- Enrique Lizalde - Guillermo Fedei
- Raúl Ramírez
- Enrique Rambal - Rey
- Beatriz Aguirre - María Fedei
- Alicia Montoya - Solagne
- Héctor Andremar - Pedro de Gravena
- Jorge Vargas - Silvio
- Antonio Bravo - Demetrio
