= Maximiliano y Carlota =

Mexican telenovela

- Genre: Telenovela
- Written by: Guadalupe Dueñas Margarita López Portillo
- Directed by: Ernesto Alonso
- Country of origin: Mexico
- Original language: Spanish
- No. of episodes: 50 (30 minutes)

Production
- Producer: Ernesto Alonso

Original release
- Network: Telesistema Mexicano
- Release: 1965

Maximiliano y Carlota is a Mexican telenovela produced by Televisa for Telesistema Mexicano in 1965.

== Cast ==
- Guillermo Murray as Maximiliano de Habsburgo
- María Rivas as Empress Carlota de Mexico
- Alberto Zayas as Napoleón III
- Anita Blanch
- Enrique Lizalde as Tomás Mejía
- Gina Romand
- Marta Zamora
- Antonio Passy
