= Corazón de dos ciudades =

Mexican telenovela

- Genre: Telenovela
- Country of origin: Mexico
- Original language: Spanish

Original release
- Network: Telesistema Mexicano

Corazón de dos ciudades (English: Heart of Two Cities) is a Mexican telenovela produced by Televisa and originally transmitted by Telesistema Mexicano.

== Cast ==
- Herbert Wallace
- Julián Bravo
- Enrique Ramsey
- Guillermo Orea
