= Sin palabras =

Television series

- Genre: Telenovela
- Written by: Carlos Lozano Dana
- Country of origin: Mexico
- Original language: Spanish

Original release
- Network: Telesistema Mexicano

Sin palabras, is a 1969 Mexican telenovela produced by Televisa and originally transmitted by Telesistema Mexicano.

== Cast ==
- Amparo Rivelles as Chantal Duhamel
- Jorge Barreiro as Adrián Duval
- Carlos Bracho as Pierre Duhamel
- Gregorio Casal as Capitán Christian Von Nacht
- Alicia Montoya -as Elise
- Chela Castro as Catherine
- Javier Ruán as Levin
- María Rubio as Sara
- Martha Zavaleta as Kapo
- Claudia Islas as Nathalie
- Marilú Elizaga as Marie
- Ricardo Mondragón as Mose
- Héctor Sáez as Carlos
