= La telaraña =

Mexican telenovela

- Genre: Telenovela; Drama
- Starring: Rafael Llamas; Angelines Fernández; Paz Villegas
- Country of origin: Mexico
- Original language: Spanish

Production
- Running time: 30 minutes

Original release
- Network: Telesistema Mexicano
- Release: 1961 – 1961

Related
- La sospecha; Vida robada

La telaraña (English title:The cobweb) is a Mexican telenovela produced by Televisa and transmitted by Telesistema Mexicano.

Rafael Llamas and Angelines Fernández starred as protagonists, Paz Villegas starred as main antagonist.

== Cast ==
- Rafael Llamas
- Angelines Fernández
- Paz Villegas
- Roberto Cañedo
- Francisco Jambrina
