= Manuel López Ochoa =

Mexican actor (1933–2011)

Manuel López Ochoa (7 July 1933 in Torno Largo, Tabasco, Mexico – 25 October 2011 in Los Angeles, United States) was a Mexican actor.

== Filmography ==
- El crisol (1964), a telenovela
- The Bandits (film) (1967) as Valdez
- Chucho el roto, a telenovela
- Chispita (1982) Telenovela
- En carne propia (1990), a telenovela
