= El padre Guernica =

Mexican telenovela

- Genre: Telenovela
- Country of origin: Mexico
- Original language: Spanish

Production
- Producer: Ernesto Alonso

Original release
- Network: Telesistema Mexicano
- Release: 1968

El padre Guernica, is a Mexican telenovela produced by Televisa and originally transmitted by Telesistema Mexicano.

== Cast ==
- Juan Carlos Ruiz
- Demetrio González
- Carmen Salas
- Manolita Saval
