= Mi maestro =

Mexican telenovela

- Genre: Telenovela
- Country of origin: Mexico
- Original language: Spanish

Original release
- Network: Telesistema Mexicano
- Release: 1968

Mi maestro, is a Mexican telenovela produced by Televisa and originally transmitted by Telesistema Mexicano.

== Cast ==
- Sara García - Sara
- Amador Bendayan - Armando
- Miguel Manzano - Ricardo
- Pilar Sen - Lola
- Yolanda Mendez - Ana María
- Sonia Furio - Sonia
- Belén Diaz
- Gloria Leticia Ortiz - Fanny
- Emma Roldán - Gertrudis
- Patricia Moran - Beatriz
- America Ramírez - Chabela
- Juan Manuel González - Carlos
- Barbara Gil - Teresa
- Olga Castillo
