= La herencia (1962 TV series) =

Mexican telenovela

- Genre: Telenovela; Romance; Drama
- Directed by: Julio Bracho
- Starring: Joaquín Cordero; María Teresa Rivas; Alicia Gutiérrez; Aurora Alvarado
- Country of origin: Mexico
- Original language: Spanish
- No. of episodes: 54

Production
- Running time: 30 minutes

Original release
- Network: Telesistema Mexicano
- Release: 1962 – 1962

Related
- La gloria quedó atrás; La herida del tiempo

La herencia (English title:The inheritance) is a Mexican telenovela produced by Televisa and transmitted by Telesistema Mexicano.

== Cast ==
- Joaquín Cordero
- María Teresa Rivas
- Alicia Gutiérrez
- Aurora Alvarado
- Eric del Castillo
- Alicia Montoya
- David Reynoso
- José Elías Moreno
