= Simplemente vivir =

Mexican telenovela

- Genre: Telenovela
- Country of origin: Mexico
- Original language: Spanish

Original release
- Network: Telesistema Mexicano
- Release: 1968

Simplemente vivir, is a Mexican telenovela produced by Televisa and originally transmitted by Telesistema Mexicano.

== Cast ==
- Chela Castro
- David Reynoso
- Guillermo Rivas
- Chela Nájera
