= Chucho el roto (TV series) =

Mexican telenovela

- Genre: Telenovela
- Country of origin: Mexico
- Original language: Spanish

Original release
- Network: Telesistema Mexicano
- Release: 1968

Chucho el roto is a Mexican telenovela produced by Televisa and originally transmitted by Telesistema Mexicano.

== Cast ==
- Manuel López Ochoa
- Blanca Sánchez
- Luciano Hernández de la Vega
- Susana Alexander
- Arturo Benavides
- Freddy Fernández
- María Eugenia Ríos
- Alicia Montoya
