= La frontera (TV series) =

- Genre: Telenovela
- Country of origin: Mexico
- Original language: Spanish

Original release
- Network: Telesistema Mexicano
- Release: 1967

La frontera is a Mexican telenovela produced by Televisa for Telesistema Mexicano in 1967.

== Cast ==
- Julissa
- Álvaro Zermeño
- Emily Cranz
- Evangelia Elizondo
- Evelyn lapuente
