= Carlos Bracho =

Mexican actor

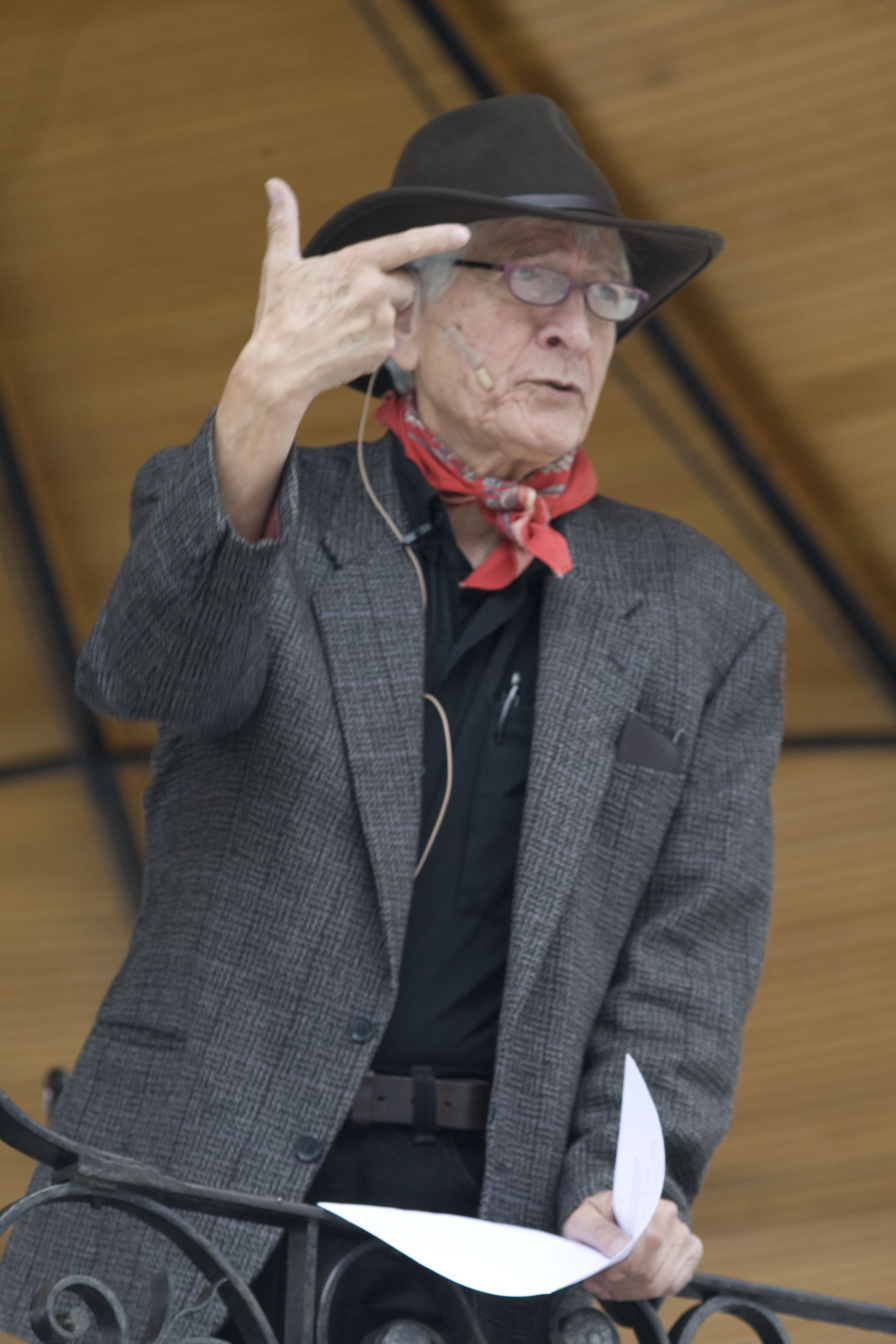
- Bracho in 2014
- Born: Carlos Enrique Bracho González; October 6, 1937 (age 88); Aguascalientes, Mexico
- Occupations: Actor, writer, producer
- Years active: 1954–present

Carlos Enrique Bracho González (born October 6, 1937) is a Mexican actor and writer.

He is one of the most experienced telenovela actors in Mexico, with more than 75 productions to his credit.

Between 1990 and 1994 he was Secretary of the Interior and Exterior of the National Association of Actors . He was also a member of the General Society of Writers of Mexico

== Filmography ==
=== Films ===
Year	Title	Role	Notes
1968	Los ángeles de Puebla	Tirso	Film debut
1970	Claudia y el deseo	Dr. Pimentel	
1970	Flor de durazno	Enrique	
1970	Rubí	César	
1970	Alguien nos quiere matar	Juan Pablo Ortigosa	
1971	La Generala	Manuel Sampedro / ingeniero Alejandro Robles Escandón	
1971	Vuelo 701	Eduardo Váldes	
1971	Mamá Dolores	Luis Borges	
1972	Me he de comer esa tuna		
1972	Lo que más queremos		
1972	El vals sin fin		
1972	Vendedor de diamantes		Short film
1973	Aquellos años		
1973	Mamá Dolores		
1973	San Simón de los Magueyes	Esteban	Writer/producer
1976	Espejismo de la ciudad	José Inés	
1977	La coquito		
1978	Ángel Negro		
1978	Cananea	Esteban Baca Calderón	
1981	El sexo de los ricos	Luis Alcántara	
1982	Antonieta	José Vasconcelos	
1990	Con el miedo en las venas	Luis Beltrán	
1995	Como sacar 10 en civismo		Short film
1995	Juego limpio	The Boss	
2011	La última muerte	Mateo Wilkins	

=== Television ===
Year	Title	Role	Notes
1966	El patio de Tlaquepaque		Television debut
1967	La tormenta	Teniente Fernández	
1967	Lo prohibido		
1967	Lágrimas amargas		
1967	Incertidumbre		
1968	Leyendas de México		
1968	Mariana	Miguel	
1968	Los Caudillos	Allende	
1969	Sin palabras	Pierre Duhamel	
1969	Más allá de la muerte	Ángel Ramírez	
1969	El retrato de Dorian Gray		
1970	La constitución		
1970	La cruz de Marisa Cruces		
1970	El precio de un hombre		
1972	El carruaje	Octavio Rivera	
1973	Mi rival	Gonzalo	
1973	La hiena	Emilio Martínez	
1974	Marina		
1975	Pobre Clara	Francisco Escobedo	
1976	Mañana será otro día	Armando	
1978	Pasiones encendidas	Fernando	
1979	Aprendiendo a amar	Alfredo	
1980	La madre		
1982	En busca del paraíso	José Luis	
1983	El maleficio	Juanito	
1988	Pasión y poder	Arturo Montenegro	Lead role
1989	Tres Generaciones		
1989	Morir para vivir	Andrés Guzmán	
1989	Luz y sombra	Ricardo Saucedo	
1990	Mi pequeña Soledad	Hernán	
1991	Valeria y Maximiliano	Miguel Landero	
1991	Milagro y magia	George O'Higgins	
1995–96	Agujetas de color de rosa	Jorge	
1996	Mi querida Isabel	Bernardo	
1996	La sombra del otro	Don Clemente	
1997	Amada enemiga		
1997	Sin ti	Félix Guzmán	
1998	Ángela	Salvador Bautista	
1999	Tres mujeres	Dr. de la Garza	
1999	Por tu amor		
1999	Alma Rebelde		
2000	Mujeres engañadas	Lic. Ernesto Sierra	
2001	El derecho de nacer	Rafael del Junco	Co-lead role
2004–2005	Mujer de Madera	Ramiro Linares	
2006	Vecinos	Tranquilino Bravo	Episode: "Aguas turbias"
2006–2007	La fea más bella	Don Humberto Mendiola	
2007	Muchachitas como tú	Bernardo Barbosa	
2007	Amor sin maquillaje	Himself	
2008	Fuego en la sangre	Don Bernardo Elizondo	6 episodes
2008	Mujeres asesinas	Leonardo	Episode: "Emma, costurera"
2010	Soy tu dueña	Father Justino Samaniego	22 episodes
2011	El Equipo	Edmundo	5 episodes
2012	Por ella soy Eva	Modesto Caballero	149 episodes
2015–2016	La vecina	Licenciado Uribe	
2017	Enamorándome de Ramón	Pedro Lamadrid	
2018	Mi marido tiene familia	Canuto "Tito" Córcega	
