= Rubí (1968 TV series) =

- Genre: Telenovela
- Written by: Yolanda Vargas Dulché
- Country of origin: Mexico
- Original language: Spanish

Original release
- Network: Telesistema Mexicano
- Release: 1968

Related
- Rubí

Rubí is a Mexican telenovela television series produced by Televisa that was originally broadcast by Telesistema Mexicano in 1968. It is based on a short story by Yolanda Vargas Dulché, published as a serial on the 1960s Mexican romance comic book Lágrimas, Risas y Amor.

== Cast ==
- Fanny Cano - Rubí Pérez Carvajal
- Antonio Medellín - Alejandro del Villar
- Carlos Fernández - César Valdés López
- Irma Lozano - Maribel Dubois
- Alicia Montoya - Doña Refugio Carvajal Vda. de Pérez
- Antonio Raxel - Julio Dubois
- María Eugenia Ríos - Cristina Pérez Carvajal
- Nancy MacKenzie - Eloísa
