= El crisol =

Mexican telenovela

- Genre: Telenovela
- Country of origin: Mexico
- Original language: Spanish

Original release
- Network: Telesistema Mexicano
- Release: 1964

El crisol is a Mexican telenovela produced by Televisa for Telesistema Mexicano in 1964.

== Cast ==
- Tony Carbajal
- Teresa Grobois
- Alicia Gutiérrez
- Manuel López Ochoa
- Emma Roldán
- Luis Aragón
- Noé Murayama
- Elodia Hernández
- Alicia Montoya
- Mary Esquivel
