= Doña Macabra =

Mexican telenovela

- Genre: Telenovela
- Created by: Hugo Argüelles
- Starring: Amparo Rivelles; Ofelia Guilmáin
- Country of origin: Mexico
- Original language: Spanish

Production
- Executive producer: Ernesto Alonso

Original release
- Network: Telesistema Mexicano
- Release: 1963

Doña Macabra is a Mexican telenovela produced by Ernesto Alonso for Telesistema Mexicano in 1963.

== Cast ==
- Amparo Rivelles as Macabra
- Ofelia Guilmáin as Demetria
- Carmen Montejo
- Narciso Busquets
- Enrique Rambal
