= Casa de huéspedes =

Mexican telenovela

- Genre: Telenovela; Romance; Drama
- Starring: Ofelia Guilmáin; Antonio Medellín; Héctor Suárez
- Country of origin: Mexico
- Original language: Spanish

Original release
- Network: Telesistema Mexicano
- Release: 1965 – 1965

Related
- La calle en que vivimos; Corona de lágrimas

Casa de huéspedes (English title:Guesthouses) is a Mexican telenovela produced by Televisa and transmitted by Telesistema Mexicano.

== Cast ==
- Ofelia Guilmáin
- Antonio Medellín
- Héctor Suárez
- María Rojo
- Dalia Íñiguez
