= Reencuentros =

Compilation album by Yuri
- Released: 1994
- Recorded: 1988-1994
- Genre: Pop
- Label: Sony International

Yuri chronology
Nueva Era (1993)	Reencuentros (1994)	Espejos del Alma (1995)

Reencuentros is a collection of hits by Mexican pop singer Yuri. It was released in 1994. It sold more than 100,000 copies earning Gold disc..

== Track listing ==
No.	Title	Writer(s)	Producer(s)	Length
1.	"Quiero volver a empezar (1994)"	Rudy Pérez	Rudy Pérez	3:55
2.	"No puedo más (1988)"	Di Felisatti, J.R. Flores	Gian Pietro Felisatti, Santanoe	3:50
3.	"Juntos (Ft. Uniko-Ko)(1994)"	Luis Enrique Mejía	Luis Enrique Mejía	4:46
4.	"Todo mi corazón (1991)"	Ilan Chester	Ary Sperling	5:12
5.	"Así es la vida (Disco Remix)(1993)"	Carlos Lara	Javier Losada	5:25
6.	"Volver a empezar (1994)"	Rudy Pérez	Rudy Pérez	5:20
7.	"La mujer que soy (1992)"	Fernando Riva, Kiko Campos	Carlos Gómez	4:09
8.	"Mi amor es para ti (1993)"	E. Morgeson, R. Hilliard, R. Resto, Miguel Tomas Lucio, S. Frenández	Alejandro Zepeda	4:10
9.	"Me tienes que querer (1989)"	J.R. Florez	Gian Pierto Felisatti	3:40
10.	"Volver a empezar (Instrumental)(1994)"	Rudy Pérez	Rudy Pérez	5:20

- Producer: Yuri
- Conducted and directed by: Rudy Pérez, Mariano Pérez, Alejandro Zepeda and Gian Pietro Felisatti
- For: Sony Music Entertainment México, SA de CV

== Singles ==
- Quiero Volver A Empezar
- Juntos (Ft. Uniko Ko)
- Volver A Empezar

=== Single Charts ===
#	Title	Mexico	L.Pop Airplay	Lat. Songs	C.R	Venezuela	Colombia	Guatemala	Nic.	Peru
1.	"Quiero Volver A Empezar"	#1	#15	n/a	#1	#1	#1	#1	#1	#1
2.	"Juntos"	#1	n/a	#22	#10	#11	#15	#5	#1	#10
