= Estafa de amor (1968 TV series) =

- Genre: Telenovela
- Written by: Caridad Bravo Adams
- Country of origin: Mexico
- Original language: Spanish

Original release
- Network: Telesistema Mexicano
- Release: 1968

Related
- Laberintos de pasión

Estafa de amor, is a Mexican telenovela produced by Televisa and originally transmitted by Telesistema Mexicano.

== Cast ==
- Maricruz Olivier - Mariana
- Enrique Lizalde - Gustavo
- Lorena Velázquez - Mayte
- Enrique Alvarez Félix - Daniel
- Miguel Manzano
- Carlos Riquelme
- Alicia Montoya
- Jorge Mondragón
- Julián Bravo
- Prudencia Grifell
- Mari Carmen González
- Reyes Bravo Mora
