= Del altar a la tumba =

- Genre: Telenovela
- Country of origin: Mexico
- Original language: Spanish

Original release
- Network: Telesistema Mexicano

Del altar a la tumba, is a 1969 Mexican telenovela produced by Televisa and originally transmitted by Telesistema Mexicano.

== Cast ==
- Alicia Rodríguez
- José Gálvez
- Liliana Durán
- Anita Blanch
