= Encadenados (1969 TV series) =

- Genre: Telenovela
- Directed by: Rafael Banquells
- Country of origin: Mexico
- Original language: Spanish

Original release
- Network: Telesistema Mexicano

Encadenados, (English: Notorious) is a 1969 Mexican telenovela produced by Televisa and originally transmitted by Telesistema Mexicano.

== Cast ==
- Ofelia Montesco
- Raúl Farell
- Dacia González
- Tito Junco
