= Un grito en la oscuridad =

Mexican telenovela

- Genre: Telenovela
- Country of origin: Mexico
- Original language: Spanish

Original release
- Network: Teleprogramas Acapulco, SA
- Release: 1968

Un grito en la oscuridad, is a Mexican telenovela produced and originally transmitted by Teleprogramas Acapulco, SA.
