= El profesor Valdez =

Mexican telenovela

- Genre: Telenovela
- Starring: Enrique Aguilar
- Country of origin: Mexico
- Original language: Spanish

Original release
- Network: Telesistema Mexicano
- Release: 1962

El profesor Valdez (English: Professor Valdez) is a Mexican telenovela produced by Televisa and broadcast by Telesistema Mexicano in 1962.

== Cast ==
- Enrique Aguilar
- Beatriz Aguirre
- Miguel Arenas
- Micaela Castejón
- Raul Farell
- Enrique Lizalde
- Francisco Jambrina
- Antonio Medellin
- Ángel Merino
- María Rojo
