= La constitución =

Mexican telenovela

- Genre: Telenovela
- Starring: María Félix; Carlos Bracho
- Country of origin: Mexico
- Original language: Spanish

Original release
- Network: Telesistema Mexicano
- Release: 1970

La constitución (English title:The Constitution) is a Mexican telenovela produced by Televisa and transmitted by Telesistema Mexicano in 1970.

== Cast ==
- María Félix as Guadalupe Arredondo
- Sonia Amelio
- Carlos Bracho
- Narciso Busquets
- Sergio Bustamante
- Miguel Córcega
- Carmen Montejo as Delfina Camacho
- Beatriz Sheridan as Carmen Serdán
- María Rubio
- Pilar Pellicer
- José Carlos Ruiz as Jovito
