= Una mujer (1965 TV series) =

- Genre: Telenovela
- Country of origin: Mexico
- Original language: Spanish
- No. of episodes: 50

Original release
- Network: Telesistema Mexicano
- Release: 1965

Una mujer is a Mexican telenovela produced by Televisa for Telesistema Mexicano in 1965.

== Cast ==
- Ramón Bugarini
- Sandra Chávez
- Andrea Cotto
- Malena Doria
