= El ojo de vidrio (TV series) =

- Genre: Telenovela
- Directed by: Rafael Banquells
- Country of origin: Mexico
- Original language: Spanish

Original release
- Network: Telesistema Mexicano

El ojo de vidrio, (English: The glass eye) is a Mexican telenovela produced by Televisa and originally transmitted by Telesistema Mexicano.

== Cast ==
- David Reynoso
- Carmelita González
- Jaime Fernández
- Carlos Martínez Baena
