= Los Caudillos =

Mexican telenovela

- Genre: Telenovela
- Country of origin: Mexico
- Original language: Spanish

Original release
- Network: Telesistema Mexicano
- Release: 1968

Los Caudillos, is a Mexican telenovela produced by Televisa and originally transmitted by Telesistema Mexicano.

== Cast ==
- Silvia Pinal as Jimena
- Enrique Rambal as Miguel Hidalgo
- Magda Guzmán as Josefa Ortiz de Domínguez
- Narciso Busquets as José María Morelos
- Ofelia Guilmáin as Felipa
- Carlos Bracho as Ignacio Allende
- Enrique Lizalde as Lisandro Jiménez
- Guillermo Aguilar as Juan Aldama
- Sergio Jiménez as Nicolás Bravo
- Enrique del Castillo as Padre Huesca
- Emma Roldán as Belisaria
- José Baviera as Carlos IV
- Raúl Meraz as Fernando VII
- José Alonso as Francisco Javier Mina
- Wally Barrón as Virrey Félix María Calleja
- Malena Doria as María Antonieta
- Gregorio Casal as Lic. González
