= Vivimos en una estrella =

Mexican telenovela

- Genre: Telenovela
- Directed by: Francisco Jambrina
- Country of origin: Mexico
- Original language: Spanish
- No. of seasons: 1
- No. of episodes: 61

Original release
- Network: Telesistema Mexicano
- Release: 1963

Vivimos en una estrella is a Mexican telenovela produced by Televisa for Telesistema Mexicano in 1963.

== Cast ==
- Beatriz Aguirre
- Magda Donato
- María Rojo
- Rafael Bertrand
- Antonio Gama
- Fernando Mendoza
- Alberto Galán
- Carlos Becerril
