= Risas amargas =

Mexican telenovela

- Genre: Telenovela
- Starring: Isabela Corona; Miguel Córcega
- Country of origin: Mexico
- Original language: Spanish

Original release
- Network: Telesistema Mexicano
- Release: 1961

Risas amargas (English: Bitter Laughter) is a Mexican telenovela produced by Televisa and broadcast by Telesistema Mexicano in 1961.

== Cast ==
- Isabela Corona
- Blanca de Castejón
- Miguel Córcega
- Manola Saavedra
- Miguel Ángel Ferriz
- Raúl Farell
