= Guadalupe Dueñas =

Mexican short story writer and essayist (1910–2002)

Guadalupe Dueñas de la Madrid
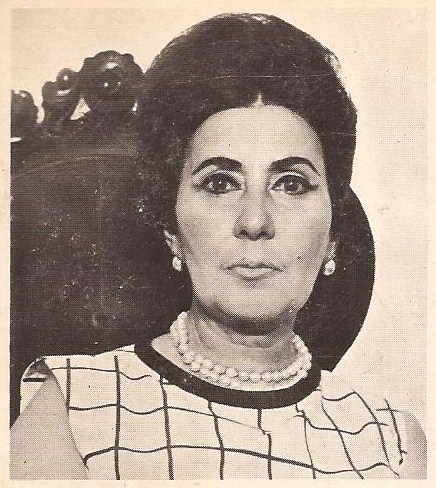
- Born: 19 October 1910 (Guadalajara, Mexico)
- Died: 13 January 2002 (Mexico City, Mexico)
- Occupations: Writer: short story writer; essayist

Guadalupe Dueñas (Guadalajara, Jalisco, 19 October 1910 – México, DF, 13 January 2002) was a 20th-century Mexican short story writer and essayist.

== Biography ==
Dueñas was the first-born daughter from the marriage between Miguel Dueñas Padilla (Spanish descent) and Guadalupe de la Madrid García, first cousin to former president of Mexico Miguel de la Madrid Hurtado and Enrique O. De la Madrid's granddaughter.

Her father was a student at the Catholic Seminary. On a trip to Colima, he met the fourteen-year-old teenager of Lebanese origin, Guadalupe de la Madrid, and left the seminary. He had her placed in a school, since she was still too young to marry. When she was of age, they married and moved to Guadalajara.

The couple formed a large family—fourteen children—eight of which reached adulthood: Guadalupe, Miguel (who died in an accident at age twenty-three), Carmelita, Gloria, Lourdes, Luz María, Manuel and María de los Ángeles.

Apart from these small family signs, little is known about the first years of Dueñas' life except for the information repeated by different sources: she completed her primary education at the Teresian Schools in Mexico City and Morelia; she took private literature classes with Emma Godoy and studied Hispanic Literature at the National Autonomous University of Mexico (UNAM).

=== Childhood ===
While there is scant a bibliography for the second years of Dueñas' life, the archive of the National Coordination of Literature houses a photocopy of an interview published just after the author's death, but which took place in 1993 at Dueñas' house on avenida Universidad, in front of the Viveros de Coyoacán.

Leonardo Martínez Carrizales, the interview's author, had had the goal of obtaining enough material to elaborate a biography similar to the manner in which Víctor Díaz Arciniega had written about Alejandro Gómez Arias, the director of the strike for university autonomy.

Carrizales' wishes were frustrated: after Easter, Dueñas did not see him again because she had to prepare, she said, silently for her death.However, before the silence, the words collected in that interview managed to give an intimate profile of the writer. For example, a father who:

"had an idea of religion from the age of cave men – no, not so much – what can I tell you, about ... well yes, terrible! […] like a replica of Isabel La Católica [and my mother was] absolutely different from him, a person of the sea, with a free, liberal family, as they were called, who had nothing to do with religious matters [However, we led] an absolutely conventional life. I didn't know anybody. We prayed the rosary with the servants. Friendships were all very Christian. We went from one convent to another. My dad would get us up at six in the morning to go to mass at seven. And since he was left with the religious question because he should have been a priest ... he woke us up with "Long live Jesus!" and I was quietly saying "let him die!", because he woke me up, I was cold, and we had to go to church for mass ... All this upset me. And my sisters, nobody else was affected. So they saw me as born evil […] I really spent all my youth in boarding school. I left already a grand lady, around eighteen years old. When I went out into the world […] I was dazzled because from neither on one side nor the other."

From one confinement to the next, between identities with which she did not feel identified ("neither on one side nor the other"), is where Guadalupe Dueñas began to write:

"I kept a diary that all the girls at school kept: it was no accident. They carried it with them and our mothers told us yes […] to say: this happened today, Monday, today, Tuesday, we pray such and such thing. Anyway, things like that. And then in that book I was really myself. I put all the hatred, the disgust that life caused me, my disappointment in what was, my total hopelessness. I was very renegade, and also very happy. I wrote verses there; I did everything I thought I could do. I brought the book, and that book that was so obscurely written, about things that didn't happen, nothing happened! I used to say: 'Today is Monday, nothing happens here, and it will never happen again. Nothing, there is not a nun who dies, there is not...' Well, horrible things [.] And there I made many verses and many half-stories that I thought were stories, and it was poetry."

The first person who read this notebook, and the poems it contained, was her uncle, the priest and humanist Alfonso Méndez Plancarte, her father's cousin on the maternal line of the surname Padilla. The importance of this first criticism is crucial, since his advice defined Dueñas' preference for prose. When he read her poems he said: "this will be very useful to you! As a basis for your writing. But never publish a verse. You are not for poetry, you belong to prose, which you write quite poetically already."

== Career ==
Dueñas never published a poem or verse, but she continued to write, wherever; "notebooks and notebooks of nonsense". It was not until she returned to Mexico City from the United States, "with a different heart, with a totally different mind," that she wrote her first short stories.

The story of Dueñas' literary beginning is anything but glamorous and, yes, full of humor, like her own stories. At a book fair, the manager of the Fondo de Cultura Económica's shelf allowed her to put her self-published work on sale, that is, a few "little stories" lined "with very beautiful paintings, all crooked, the cows standing in line, a success—not what I wrote, but what I painted, was the funniest thing."

She remembers that milestone event in her literary life with these words:Probably this fact would not have had greater significance, if it were not for the fact that among those attending the fair were impressive buyers: don Alfonso Reyes, Octavio Paz, Julio Torri. This book-story was so funny, so expensive (10 pesos), that they bought it. It gave them a sense of tenderness, she says, they thought it was probably the work of an old lady with enough self-esteem to place her stories on sale. However, Emmanuel Carballo, who at that time was collaborating with the supplement 'México en la cultura,' saw in the story of 'Mariquita', something more than just a curious event, and he telephoned the writer to discuss the possibility of publishing her stories:

"Well, I imagine that you are an old lady, and that you do not want to come [Carballo said]". 'Yes [answered the young Dueñas] I am very old. I just go out when someone takes me, or with the cane.' '[Y]es miss, I understand, but don't be too careful, we will send [?] to pick it up; but do you have someone else?' 'Yes [...] I have "La tía Carlota."

Carballo was the first to print Dueñas' work, followed by Alfonso and Gabriel Méndez Plancarte brothers in their magazine, Ábside, revista de cultura mexicana. Janua The stories "Las ratas", "El Correo", "Los lojos" and "Mi chimpancé" were included in the July–September 1954 issue and later distributed as a separate plaquette. Dueñas was a regular contributor after these first published texts, including "El moribundo", "Digo yo como vaca" and "Diplodocus Sapiens" in 1955, "La hora desteñida" in 1956, "Autopresentación" in 1966 and "Carta a un aprendiz de cuentos" in 1960. In addition, she also published essays such as "La locura de Emma" in 1970 and a text giving homage to Emma Godoy in January 1974. Between 1958 and 1991, Guadalupe Dueñas published 69 short stories that were included in three books.

== Works ==
=== Individual ===
- Las ratas y otros cuentos, Mexico, 1954.
- Tiene la noche un árbol, Mexico, Fondo de Cultura Económica, Letras Mexicanas, 1958.
- No moriré del todo, Mexico, Joaquín Mortiz, 1976.
- Imaginaciones, Mexico, Jus, 1977 (brief literary-biographical portraits of writers and intellectuals).
- Antes del silencio, Mexico, Fondo de Cultura Económica, Letras Mexicanas, 1991
- Guadalupe Dueñas Obras Completas. Fondo de Cultura Económica, 2017.
- Memoria de una espera. Novel. (2017)

=== Anthologies ===
- "Pasos en la escalera", "La extraña visita" y "Girándula", en Girándula, Mexico, Porrúa, 1973.
- "Guadalupe Dueñas" en Los narradores ante el público 2.ª serie, Mexico, Joaquín Mortiz, 1967, pp. 57–65 (Paper read in Palacio de Bellas Artes in Mexico City).
- Guadalupe Dueñas ¡está de moda...!: ficciones, invenciones, colaboraciones y versiones; testimonio de Vicente Leñero [prologue by Gerardo de la Cruz], Mexico, Conaculta-INBA, 2012 (available online)
- Países del limbo, Una antología de la narrativa mexicana del siglo XX (2001)
- Obras completas / Guadalupe Dueñas; selección y prólogos Patricia Rosas Lopátegui; introducción Beatriz Espejo, Ciudad de México: Fondo de Cultura Económica FCE, 2017, ISBN 978-607-16-4609-5

=== Works Translated into English ===
- "The Rats," English translation by Yolanda Fauvet in Asymptote Journal (2020).
- "The Guide Through Death" and "The Fat Lady," English translation by Josie Hough in Translator's Corner (2020).
- "In Heaven" and "Shoes for the Rest of My Life" in Short Stories By Latin American Women: The Magic and the Real. Modern Library pbk. ed. New York: Modern Library (2003). ISBN 978-0-8129-6707-4
- "Mariquita and Me" in Pyramids of Glass: Short Fiction from Modern Mexico. Corona Pub Co. (1994).
- "The Tree" and "The Moribund" in Short Stories of Latin America. New York: Las Americas Pub. Co. (1963).
- "A Clinical Case" in The Muse in Mexico: A Mid-Century Miscellany. Texas: Univ of Texas Press (1959).

== Distinctions ==
- Premio José María Vigil, Best Book of 1959 for Tiene la noche un árbol.
- Fellowship at the Centro Mexicano de Escritores (CME) from 1961 to 1962.

== Bibliography ==
- Castro Ricalde, Maricruz. "Entre la elocuencia y el silencio". Guadalupe Dueñas, después del silencio." Mexico: TEC-FONCA-UNAM-UAM, 2010a. 45–61
- ____. "Yo soy el otro: Imaginaciones de Guadalupe Dueñas." Guadalupe Dueñas, después del silencio. Mexico: TEC-FONCA-UNAM-UAM, 2010b. 103–107
- ----. "Guadalupe Dueñas y las Tertulias del Mate" en Sara Poot-Herrera (ed). Bebida y Literatura. Aguas Santas de la Creación. Vol. II. Mexico: Ayuntamiento de Mérida, UC-Mexicanistas, 2011. pp. 145–163. ISBN 968-5055-14-9
- ---. "Antes del silencio (1991): el catecismo personal de Guadalupe Dueñas" en Maricruz Castro y Marie-Agnès Palaisi-Robert. Narradoras mexicanas y argentinas siglos XX–XXI. Antología crítica. París: Éditions Mare et Martin, 2011, p. 29–46. ISBN 978-2-84934-077-6
- ---. "Visos fantásticos en la narrativa de Guadalupe Dueñas", en Revista de Literatura Mexicana Contemporánea. Vol. 17, no. 50, University of Texas at El Paso, Ed. Neón, 2011. pp. vii–xiii, ISSN 1405-2687
- ---. "Animalización de los sujetos y estructuras sociales en la narrativa de Guadalupe Dueñas" en Cecilia Eudave y Encarnación López (coords.). Zoomex. Los animales en la literatura mexicana. Guadalajara: Universidad de Guadalajara, 2012.
- Espejo, Beatriz. "Guadalupe Dueñas, una fantasiosa que escribía cuentos basados en la realidad". Seis niñas ahogadas en una gota de agua. Beatriz Espejo (comp). Mexico: DEMAC/UANL, 2009. 35–53
- Flores, Mauricio. "Hablaron Dueñas y Leñero de su paso por el Centro de Escritores Mexicanos". El nacional. Second section. 26 June (1986): 7
- Leñero, Vicente. "Lo que sea de cada quien. El huésped de Guadalupe Dueñas". Revista de la Universidad de México. Número 46. December (2007): 106.
- López Morales, Laura. "El arte de escribir cuentos". Guadalupe Dueñas, después del silencio. México: TEC-FONCA-UNAM-UAM, 2010. 65–78
- Gümes, César and Ericka Montaño. "Relatos clásicos, legado de Lupe Dueñas a la literatura mexicana". La jornada virtual. Sunday 13 January 2002.
- González Suárez, Mario. Paisajes del limbo: una antología de la narrativa mexicana del siglo XX. Mexico: Tusquets Editores, 2001.
- Miller, Beth y Alonso González. "Guadalupe Dueñas". Veintiséis autoras del México actual. Mexico: Costa-Amic Editor, 1978. 153–173.
- Ocampo, Aurora y Ernesto Prado Velásquez. Diccionario de escritores mexicanos. Mexico: Universidad Nacional Autónoma de México, 1997.
- Sabido, Miguel. "Pita, la hechicera cotidiana". Guadalupe Dueñas, después del silencio. Mexico: TEC-FONCA-UNAM-UAM, 2010. 41–44
- Tenorio, Marta. "Guadalupe Dueñas y su viejo naranjo". Punto. Un periódico de periodistas. Weekly. Literature section, num 137, 17–23 June (1985): 19.
- Trejo Valencia, Gabriela. Dueñas. La Pequeña Galería del Escritor Hispanoamericano: Universidad de Guanajuato, 2019. ISBN 978-607-441-649-7

== Theses About Dueñas ==
- Piñeiro Carballeda, Aurora. Tiene la noche una Venus oscura: la cuentística de Angela Carter y Guadalupe Dueñas desde la perspectiva de la literatura gótica. UNAM. 2001
- Castellanos Hernández, Gloria. El fantasma narrativo de Guadalupe Dueñas en el cuento Historia de Mariquita. UNAM. 2001.
- Gutiérrez De la Torre, Silvia Eunice. Guadalupe Dueñas: poética. Parodia y símbolo. Universidad Veracruzana. 2012
