= La actriz =

Mexican telenovela

- Genre: Telenovela
- Starring: Magda Guzmán
- Country of origin: Mexico
- Original language: Spanish

Original release
- Network: Telesistema Mexicano
- Release: 1962 – 1962

La actriz (English: The Actress) is a Mexican telenovela produced by Televisa and broadcast by Telesistema Mexicano in 1961.

== Cast ==
- Magda Guzmán
- Carlos López Moctezuma
- Dolores Tinoco
- María Douglas
