= José Solé (actor) =

Mexican theater director, stage actor and set designer

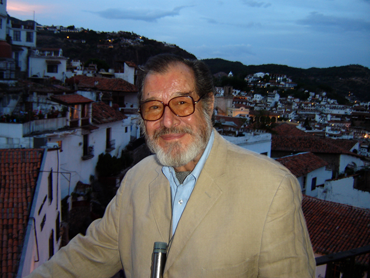
- Solé in 2009
- Born: José Solé Nájera; July 28, 1929
- Died: February 15, 2017 (aged 87); Mexico City, Mexico
- Occupations: Stage actor and director
- Years active: 1946–2010

José Solé (July 28, 1929 – February 15, 2017) was a Mexican theater director, stage actor, and set designer whose career extended over six decades. His interest in theater began during childhood in a small community then outside of Mexico City proper. Although he acted some small parts in movies, his theater career began while doing formal theater training, first in Mexico then in France. He worked to promote theater in Mexico, which did not experience the kind of governmental support that the other arts did after the Mexican Revolution, performing in and directing a wide variety of plays, as well as directing theaters and even the theatrical division of the Instituto Nacional de Bellas Artes (National Institute of Fine Arts). He received recognition for both acting and directing early in his career, but major awards such as Premio Nacional de Ciencias y Artes (National Prize for Arts and Sciences) in the 2000s.

== Background ==
José Solé (full name José Solé Nájera) was born to María Magdalena Nájera and José Solé, a Spanish refugee of an upper-class family, in a community called Mixcoac. At that time, Mixcoac was separate from Mexico City, a small town with farms, stone paved streets and an economy based on providing produce to the nearby capital.

His introduction to theater came through a street performance in the small town, Solé was restless and the activity impressed him, deciding early to go into show business despite his family's lack of connections with this world. When he was seven his father gave him a set for a puppet theater, which he loved enough that his parents decided to take it from him as punishment during vacations after he failed classes at school.

His early experience in acting came from forming a theater group in middle school and when he was older, taking on small character parts in movies. He then went on to study formally, first at the School of Theater Arts (Escuela de Arte Teatral) of the Instituto Nacional de Bellas Artes (INBA) . In 1956 he traveled to Paris to study scene direction with Rene Dupoy on scholarship from the French government. He also studied set design at the Escuela Nacional de Pintura, Escultura y Grabado "La Esmeralda".

His career in theater began in 1946 and continued uninterrupted until he announced his retirement in 2010.

In the 1990s he had a laryngectomy, requiring the use of an electrolarynx.

== Career ==
Solé had a theatrical career that spanned over six decades, starting as an actor then expanding into stage direction, set and costume design, as well as directing theaters and cultural institutions.

His theatrical acting career began in 1946, as part of the Teatro Estudiantil Autónomo (Autonomous Student Theater), becoming a member of the INBA Theater Company in 1948. Studying at National Autonomous University of Mexico, he joined the Compañía de Teatro Universitario in 1950, with did several tours around Mexico.

He made his debut as a director in the early 1960s, with the play Amadeo by Eugene Ionesco, During the same decade, he became the director of the Xola Theater (today the Julio Prieto Theater) from 1965 to 1968. In the 1970s, Solé became the director of the INBA Theatrical Department (1977-1987/1991-1994), including the school he studied acting at.

Solé founded cultural institutions such as Mexico's National Theater Company (Compañía Nacional de Teatro) and the Rodolfo Usigli National Center of Theater Research, Documentation and Information, along with the Muestra Nacional de Teatro (National Theater Show) in the 1970s. He also served as a cultural attaché of the Mexican embassy in the Soviet Union from 1975 to 1977.

Solé's career got its start at a time when Mexico's theater was in crisis. Despite government funding for a number of arts after the Mexican Revolution, theater was not included, and split into those which performed foreign works commercially and those who tried to perform more nationalistic works without government support. Solé does not believe in dividing theater into types such as experimental or commercial, forming and directing theater groups that performed all styles of works. He, himself, has directed most genres of theatre including children's, musical comedy, commercial productions, experimental, opera and even some television, and include "Moctezuma II", by Sergio Magaña; "La casa de Bernarda Alba", by Federico García Lorca; "La Orestiada", by Esquilo; "Las Troyanas", by Eurípides; "El avaro", by Molière, "El alcalde de Zalamea", by Calderón de la Barca; "Otelo" and "A Midsummer Night's Dream", by William Shakespeare.

== Recognition ==
Six years after his debut in theater, Solé received the 1952 Mexican Theater Critics Association Prize for best young actor. The same organization recognized him as best actor in 1954. His acting debut earned him a Best Direction award from the Mexican Theater Critics Association. The prize for Best Produccion of the Mexican Theater Critics Association now bear his name.

Solé's first major recognition for his life's work was in 1997, at the National Theater Show, which he founded. In 2008, he received Premio Nacional de Ciencias y Artes (National Arts and Sciences Prize), presented at the Palacio de Bellas Arts. This was followed by the Pillar of Theater in Mexico Medal at the Centro Cultural del Bosque in 2009, and the Clavis Palafoxianum from the state of Puebla in 2013.

In 2014, Solé was honored at the Festival Internacional Cervantino, and accepted as a member of the International Theatre Institute of UNESCO.
