= Puente de amor =

1969 Mexican telenovela

- Genre: Telenovela
- Created by: Marissa Garrido
- Country of origin: Mexico
- Original language: Spanish

Original release
- Network: Telesistema Mexicano

Related
- A Ponte do Amor

Puente de amor, is a 1969 Mexican telenovela produced by Telesistema Mexicano.

== Cast ==
- Angélica María
- Ernesto Alonso
- Beatriz Baz
- Chela Castro
- Yolanda Ciani
