= Hortensia Santoveña =

Mexican actress

- Born: October 17, 1912; Tlalpujahua, Michoacán, Mexico
- Died: July 11, 1986 (aged 73); Mexico
- Spouse: Pascual Garcia Peña

Hortensia Santoveña (17 October 1912 – 11 July 1986) was a Mexican actress best known for her work in the films Eugenia Grandet (1953), Two Mules for Sister Sara (1970) and Talpa (1956). She was nominated for an Ariel Award for Best Supporting Actress for Talpa in 1957. She was also nominated for an Ariel Award for Best Actress in a Minor Role for Eugenia Grandet in 1954.
