= Socorro Avelar =

Mexican actress

- Born: 1925; Cuernavaca, Morelos, Mexico
- Died: 11 February 2003 (aged 77–78)
- Occupation: Actor

Socorro Avelar (1925 in Cuernavaca, Mexico – 11 February 2003) was a Mexican actress.

== Life ==
Avelar studied at the Faculty of Philosophy and Literature of the National Autonomous University of Mexico. In 1946, she debuted as a director for the play Doña Clarines. The following year, she went to the National Institute of Fine Arts and Literature. In 1950, she debuted as a stage actress in the play Rosalba y los llaveros, and as a film actress in 1962 film El tejedor de milagros. She also wrote the play Los irredentos (The Unredeemed) which was never released.

On February 11, 2003, she died of stomach cancer.
