= Emily Cranz =

Mexican actress, singer and dancer (1940–2025)

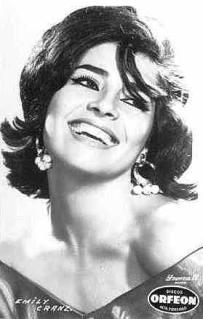
- Cranz in 1962

Background information
- Born: Emma Cranz Amillano; September 21, 1940; Tucson, Arizona, U.S.
- Died: July 22, 2025 (aged 84) Houston, Texas, U.S.
- Occupations: Actress, singer, dancer
- Years active: 1962–1970

Emily Cranz (September 21, 1940 – July 22, 2025) was an American-born Mexican actress, singer and dancer.

== Early life ==
Emma Cranz Cantillano was born in Tucson, Arizona, on September 21, 1940, as one of six children (three boys and three girls). Her father, Frank, was German-American, and her mother, Evangelina (née Amillano) (1909-1964), was Mexican.

In 1953, as a ten year-old girl, Cranz participated as a dancer and singer in community events in Tucson, Arizona. In February of that year, at the Mission View PTA meeting, which took place in the school auditorium, Cranz and a schoolmate were featured in a group of Mexican dances. Then, she participated in the September 16 Mexican Independence Day Celebration as a dancer and singer, who serenaded the Lady of Guadalupe. Her mother, Evangelina, was an organizer, and her sister, whose name was also Evangelina, was a dancer, as well. The program was broadcast over station KVOA. As a teenager, she sang at benefits and on a local radio station. At the age of 13, she appeared on television, which did not make a big impression, so her parents moved to Los Angeles, California to try to have her break in as a professional singer. Later, she joined the Chuck Rio Quintet in Las Vegas and performed with them for several seasons. She left the group to record with Orfeón in Mexico.

== Career ==
In 1961, Cranz began her career as a Mexican recording artist on the Peerless label, backed up by Los Boppers, singing "Ahora o Nunca" and on the flip-side "Papa Loves Mambo" on a 45 rpm single. Later, she recorded on the Maya, Orfeón, Dimsa, and RCA Victor labels various singles and albums in Spanish, and, most notably, an English album (backed by the Mariachi Guadalajara) called "Speak to Me."

In 1962, she appeared on the Paco Malgesto program every Saturday night on KWEX-TV Ch.41 in San Antonio, Texas.

From 1963 to 1970, Cranz appeared in Mexican movies, television variety shows, and telenovelas (soap operas), where, in addition to acting, she would frequently sing or dance. She considered herself to be a "vedette" (a showgirl), rather than a serious actress.

One of her more popular appearances was in 1966, when she co-starred with Gaspar Henaine as Capulina in La cigüeña distraída (1966), a comedy film directed by Emilio Gómez Muriel.

She also accompanied show troupes and performed in different cities. In 1962, she was a member of a Mexico City troupe—complete with recording artists, dancers, and mariachis—that headlined the annual Fiesta de Mayo celebration in her home town of Tucson.

In 1970, she appeared on U.S. television in the Bob Hope Comedy Special, which was set in Acapulco during the Mexico International Film Festival.

== Retirement and death ==
Cranz died on July 22, 2025, in Houston, Texas at the age of 84.

== Charitable causes ==
The Emily Cranz foundation in Houston, Texas honored legendary Mexican comedian Mario Moreno "Cantinflas" with its 1992 Gracias Award for his work on behalf of children. The charity benefit raised money to aid children living in crisis environments.

== Selected filmography ==
- La cigüeña distraída (1966)
