= Carlos Ancira =

Mexican actor

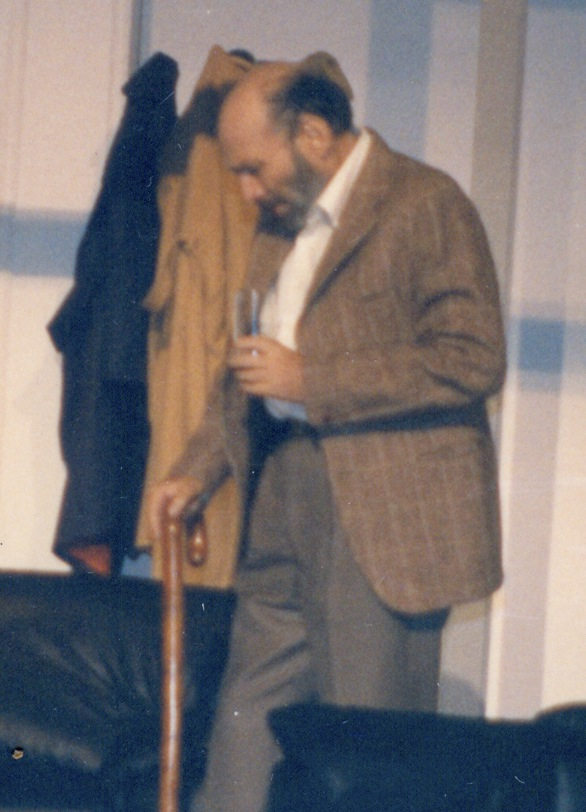
- Born: 20 August 1929; Mexico City, Mexico
- Died: 10 October 1987 (aged 58); Mexico City, Mexico
- Occupation: Actor
- Years active: 1950–1986

Carlos Ancira (20 August 1929 – 10 October 1987) was a Mexican film actor. He appeared in more than sixty films from 1950 to 1986.

== Selected filmography ==
Film
Year	Title	Role	Notes
1952	Hambre nuestra de cada día		
1963	The Paper Man		
1969	La señora Muerte		

TV
Year	Title	Role	Notes
1986	El Camino Secreto		
1985	Vivir un poco		

== Awards ==
- TVyNovelas Award for Best First Actor (1986, 1987)
