= Alejandro Ciangherotti =

Mexican actor (1920–2017)

- Born: 1920; Mexico
- Died: 30 May 2017 (aged 96–97); Mexico City, Mexico
- Occupation: Actor
- Years active: 1953–1999

Alejandro Ciangherotti (1920 – 30 May 2017) was a Mexican film actor. He appeared in 45 films between 1953 and 1999.

== Selected filmography ==
=== Film ===
- Strange Obsession (1947)
- Marked Cards (1948)
- Beau Ideal (1948)
- You Shall Not Covet Thy Son's Wife (1950)
- She and I (1951) – Andres
- The Woman You Want (1952)
- The Coward (1953) - Roberto, niño (uncredited)
- The Second Woman (1953) - Ramón, niño
- Los que no deben nacer (1953)
- El niño y la niebla (1953) - Daniel
- Amor y pecado (1956) - Miguel adolescente
- Bodas de oro (1956)
- Esposas infieles (1956)
- Pepito as del volante (1957) - Freddy Larios
- La edad de la tentación (1959) - Andrés Zamacona
- La sombra en defensa de la juventud (1960)
- Cuando regrese mamá (1961) - Ricardo
- Mañana serán hombres (1961) - Vicente
- Muchachas que trabajan (1961) - Amigo de Ricardo
- Jóvenes y rebeldes (1961)
- Jóvenes y bellas (1962)
- La edad de la violencia (1964) - El Zurdo
- ¡Ay, Jalisco no te rajes! (1965) - Charrasqueado
- La recta final (1966) - Raúl Landa
- Nuestros buenos vecinos de Yucatán (1967) - Tony
- Báñame mi amor (1968)
- La isla de los hombres solos (1974) - Jacinto
- El valle de los miserables (1975) - Prisionero
- Tintorera (1977) - Fisherman #1
- Cuchillo (1978)
- El patrullero 777 (1978) - Hombre de serenata
- Cyclone (1978)
- Cananea (1978) - Empleado oficina
- Mil millas al sur (1978) - Mário
- Guyana: Crime of the Century (1979) - Commune Member
- La guerra de los pasteles (1979) - Narciso
- Nora la rebelde (1979)
- Vivir para amar (1980)
- La Pachanga (1981) - Vicente
- Las perfumadas (1983)
- Perico el de los palotes (1984)
- Barrio salvaje (1985)
- Mas buenas que el pan (1987)
- The Last Tunnel (1987) - Septien
- Las movidas del mofles (1987)
- Cacería implacable (1988)
- Solicito marido para engañar (1988)
- Diana, René, y El Tíbiri (1988)
- Cargamento mortal (1989)
- A gozar, a gozar, que el mundo se va acabar (1990)
- Perfume, efecto inmediato (1994)
- El último suspiro (1996)
- Reclusorio III (1999)

=== Telenovelas ===
- Cuando seas mía (2001) - Ricardo Sandoval
