= Maricruz Olivier =

Mexican actress (1934–1984)

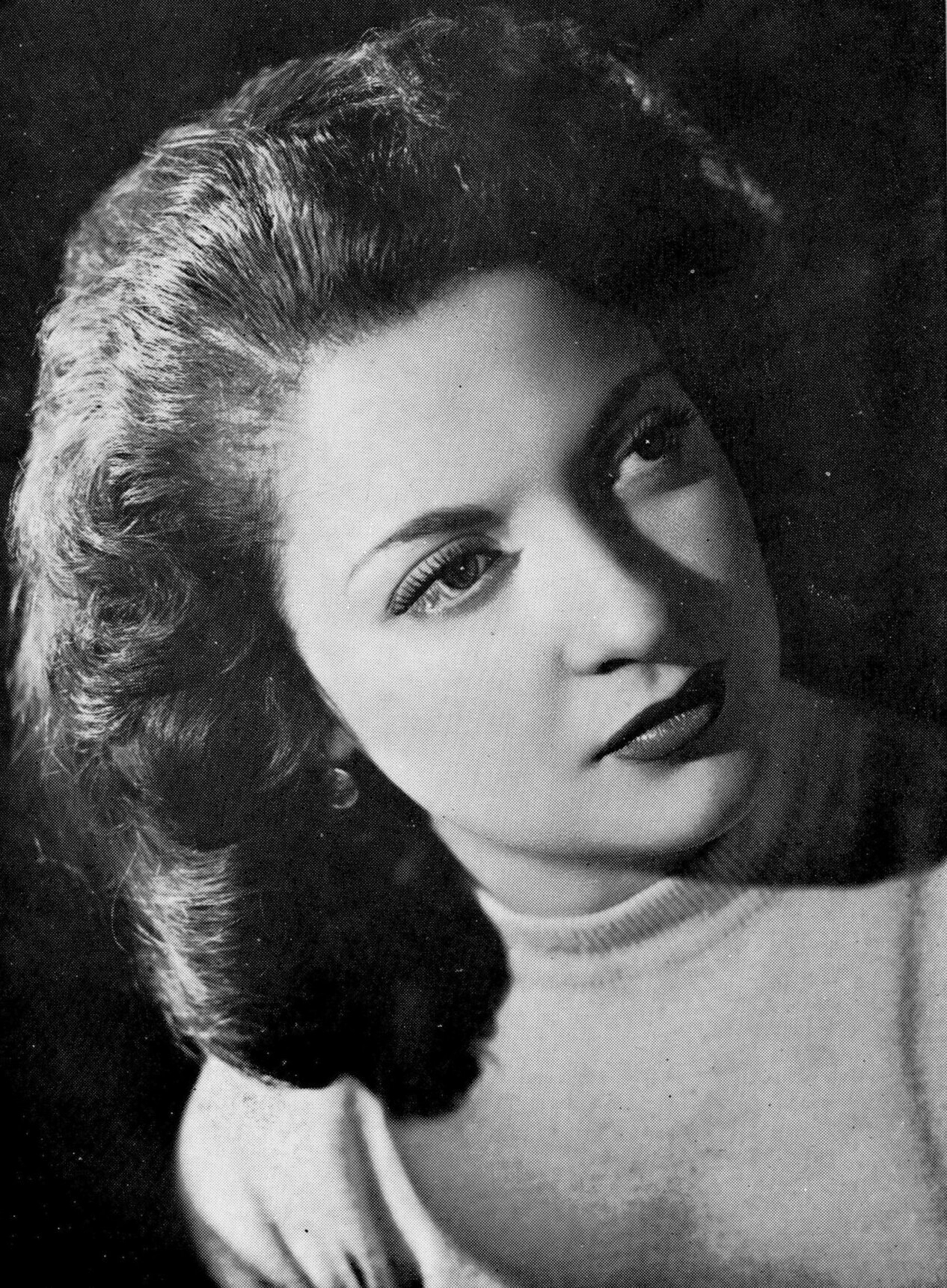
- Olivier in 1954
- Born: María de la Cruz Olivier Obergh; 19 September 1934; Tehuacán, Puebla
- Died: 10 October 1984 (aged 50); Mexico City, Mexico
- Occupations: Film and television actress
- Years active: 1953–1984
- Parent(s): Mercedes Shirley Obergh; Jesús Erick Olivier Miranda

María de la Cruz "Maricruz" Olivier Obergh (19 September 1934 – 10 October 1984) was a Mexican actress of film, television, and theater. She is best remembered for starring in the 1959 version of the telenovela Teresa, which was a success as it established her on-screen persona of playing villains.

== Early life ==
Olivier was born María de la Cruz Olivier Obergh to Mercedes Shirley Obergh in the city of Tehuacán, Puebla. Olivier studied philosophy, literature, and acting for two years in the Academia Andrés Soler. Her film debut was in Esos de Penjamo in 1951, and her theatrical debut was in the play, Que no es cordero. Because of her participation in the 1955 play Santa Juana, Olivier became one of the most important young actresses of the decade.

== Film career ==
Although Olivier was popularly known for playing villainous-type roles, she had also appeared in many other different film genres. In 1959, she co-starred with Anabel Gutiérrez as one of the love interests of Viruta y Capulina (popular comic actors at the time) in the comedy film, Angelitos del trapecio.

In 1962, she starred with Antonio Aguilar in the revolutionary-drama Sol en llamas, where she portrayed an hacendado's daughter in the midst of an hacienda during pre-revolutionary Mexico in 1910.

Aside from all these genres, her astounding sinister-beauty and acting captivated the audience to believe in her work. As she once quoted in 1983:

"The villains gave me fame. The people have hated my roles of cursed women, only four in my career. I know that they don't hate me. In the minds of people I did not stay a villain, but an actress. When I did Teresa, there were those who stopped me on the street to give me advice: do not be a bad daughter missy! Behave better with your parents! Other people told me: what a horrible behavior! Behind all this I was still interpreting her."

== Filmography (selected) ==
- The Strange Passenger (1953)
- The Murderer X (1955)
- Every Child a Cross to Bear (1957)
- Quinceañera (1960)
- Teresa (1959)
- El derecho de nacer (1966)
- El caballo bayo (1966)
- Un dorado de Pancho Villa (1967)
- Hasta El Viento Tiene Miedo (1968)
- Como pescar marído (1968)
- El oficio más antiguo del mundo (1970)
- Tres Mujeres en la Hoguera (1979)
- La Niña de los Hoyitos (1984)

=== TV ===
- Teresa (1959)
- Estafa de amor (1968)
- Barata de primavera (1975)
- Viviana (1978)

== Bibliography ==
- Agrasánchez Jr., Rogelio (2001). Bellezas del cine mexicano/Beauties of Mexican Cinema. Archivo Fílmico Agrasánchez. ISBN 968-5077-11-8.
