= Telesistema Mexicano =

Mexican broadcasting company

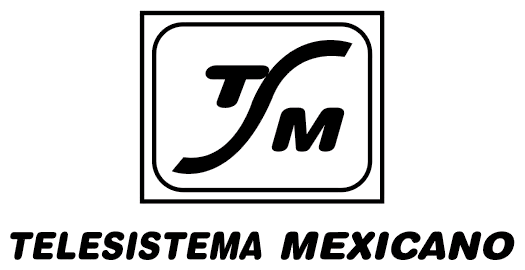
- Type: Broadcast television distributor
- Industry: Mass media
- Founded: 1955; 71 years ago
- Founder: Emilio Azcárraga Vidaurreta; Rómulo O'Farrill; Guillermo González Camarena; Ernesto Barrientos Reyes
- Defunct: January 8, 1973; 53 years ago
- Fate: Merged with Televisión Independiente de México to become Televisa
- Successor: Televisa
- Headquarters: Mexico City, Mexico
- Area served: Mexico
- Products: Nefertiti y Aquenatos
- Total assets: XEW Canal 2 XHTV Canal 4 XHGC Canal 5

Telesistema Mexicano was the predecessor of Televisa. Telesistema Mexicano was a television alliance made up of the independently owned television flagship stations XEW Canal 2, XHTV Canal 4, and XHGC Canal 5 in Mexico, Distrito Federal.

== History ==
Telesistema Mexicano was founded in 1955 when Mexico, Distrito Federal television stations XEW Canal 2 owned by Emilio Azcárraga Vidaurreta, XHTV Canal 4 owned by Rómulo O'Farrill, XHGC Canal 5 owned by Guillermo González Camarena, and capital and expertise from Ernesto Barrientos Ventosa merged to form an alliance. Its programming originated from the Televicentro building. By the early 1970s, TSM was the most powerful television network in Latin America; its productions were exported to Central American countries without production capabilities. TSM also produced the television coverage of the 1970 FIFA World Cup and sold the rights to individual international networks, among them an exclusive deal with ITV in the United Kingdom, which infuriated the BBC.

In 1968 Monterrey businessmen established Televisión Independiente de México XHTM Canal 8 in Mexico, Distrito Federal to compete with Telesistema Mexico but later ended up being merged with their competitor in 1973. This last merger between Telesistema de Mexico and Televisión Independiente de México led to the creation of Television Via Satellite (Televisa).

== Stations at merging time ==
Information correct as of the 1972/73 Television Factbook:

- Acapulco: XHAP-TV 2
- Aguascalientes: XHAG-TV 13 (affiliate)
- Campeche: XHAN-TV 12 (affiliate)
- Cerro del Zamorano: XEZ-TV 3 (affiliate)
- Cerro del Zamorano: XHZ-TV 6
- Chihuahua: XHCH-TV 2
- Chihuahua: XHFI-TV 5 (affiliate)
- Chilpancingo: XHAK-TV 12
- Ciudad Jiménez: XHBU-TV 8
- Ciudad Victoria: XHTK-TV 11
- Coatzacoalcos: XHCV-TV 3 (affiliate)
- Colima: XHBZ-TV 10
- Córdoba y Orizaba: XHAH-TV 8
- Culiacán: XHBT-TV 7
- Durango: XHA-TV 10
- El Zamorano: XEZ-TV 3
- Guadalajara: XEWO-TV 2 (XEW affiliate)
- Guadalajara: XHG-TV 6 (XHTV affiliate)
- Hermosillo: XEWH-TV 6 (XEW affiliate)
- Juarez: XEPM-TV 2 (affiliate)
- Las Lajas: XHAH-TV 8 (affiliate)
- Las Lajas: XHAI-TV 10 (affiliate)
- Las Lajas: XHAJ-TV 5 (XHGC affiliate)
- Los Mochis: XHBS-TV 4
- Matamoros: XHAB-TV 7
- Mazatlan: XHOW-TV 12
- Mérida: XHY-TV 3 (affiliate)
- Mérida: XHTP-TV 9 (affiliate)
- Mexicali: XHBC-TV 3
- Mexico City: XEW-TV 2
- Mexico City: XHTV-TV 4
- Mexico City: XHGC-TV 5
- Mexico City: XEX-TV 7 (XHTV later XHGC affiliate, later moved to channel 8 to accommodate XHIMT-TV
- Monclova: XHBW-TV 9
- Monterrey: XHFM-TV 3 (XEW affiliate, later moved to channel 2)
- Monterrey: XHX-TV 10 (affiliate)
- Morelia: XHKW-TV 10 (affiliate)
- Navojoa: XHBF-TV 8
- Nuevo Laredo: XEFE-TV 2 (affiliate)
- Oaxaca: XHBN-TV 7
- Obregón: XHI-TV 5
- Saltillo: XHAE-TV 5
- Tampico: XHGO-TV 7 (affiliate)
- Tampico: XHD-TV 4 (affiliate)
- Tapachula: XHAA-TV 7 (affiliate)
- Tepic: XHBC-TV 10
- Tijuana: XEWT-TV 10 (XEW affiliate)
- Torreón: XHO-TV 11
- Zacatecas: XHBQ-TV 8

After the TIM-TSM merger, four TSM stations joined the existing TSM station portfolio (XHTM-TV, XET-TV, XHP-TV and XHFM-TV) and were realigned into the existing Televisa networks.
