= List of Televisa telenovelas (1970s) =

The following is a list of telenovelas produced by Televisa in the 1970s.

== 1970 ==
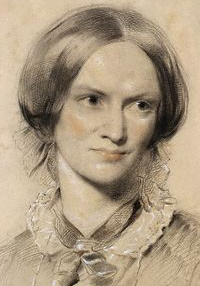
Ardiente secreto and Cumbres Borrascosas They were inspired by works of British Charlotte Brontë.

#	Year	Title	Author	Director	Ref.
252	1970	Angelitos negros	Joselito Rodríguez	Valentín Pimstein	
253	1970	Aventura	Mimí Bechelani	Manolo García	
254	1970	La constitución	Narciso Busquets	Ernesto Alonso	
255	1970	Cosa juzgada	Luz María Aguilar	Miguel Córcega	
256	1970	La cruz de Marisa Cruces	Carlos Bracho	Raúl Araiza	
257	1970	El Dios de barro	Fernanda Villeli	Luis Aragón	
258	1970	Encrucijada	Jacqueline Andere	Antulio Jiménez Pons	
259	1970	La Gata	Inés Rodena	Valentín Pimstein	
260	1970	Magdalena	Magda Guzmán	Hugo Cervantes	
261	1970	El mariachi	Cuco Sánchez	Fernando Wagner	
262	1970	Mariana	Irma Lozano	Enrique Aguilar	
263	1970	El precio de un hombre	Caridad Bravo Adams	Miguel Córcega	
264	1970	Rafael	Angelines Fernández	Enrique Aguilar	
265	1970	La sonrisa del diablo	Maricruz Olivier	Ernesto Alonso	
266	1970	Yesenia	Yolanda Vargas Dulché	Valentín Pimstein	
267	1970	Y volveré	Irma Lozano	Ernesto Alonso	

== 1971 ==
#	Year	Title	Author	Director	Ref.
268	1971	El amor tiene cara de mujer	Nené Cascallar	Valentín Pimstein	
269	1971	Cristo negro	Enrique Lizalde	Tony Carbajal	
270	1971	El derecho de los hijos	Silvia Derbez	Ernesto Alonso	
271	1971	Historia de un amor	Jorge Mistral	Manolo García	
272	1971	Lucía Sombra	David Antón	Fernanda Villeli	
273	1971	La maestra Méndez	Lucía Mendez	Ernesto Alonso	
274	1971	La maldición de la blonda	Gloria Marín	Fernando Wagner	
275	1971	Las máscaras	Marga López	Ernesto Alonso	
276	1971	Mis tres amores	David Antón	Antulio Jiménez Pons	
277	1971	Muchacha italiana viene a casarse	Marissa Garrido	Ernesto Alonso	
278	1971	Pequeñeces	David Bravo	Joaquín Cordero	
279	1971	El profesor particular	Luz María Aguilar	Manolo García	
280	1971	La recogida	Julio Porter	Fernando Wagner	
281	1971	Rosas para Verónica	Ignacio López Tarso	Carlos Barrios Porras	
282	1971	Sublime redención	Alicia Bonet	Rafael Banquells	
283	1971	El vagabundo	Silvia Derbez	Sonia Furió	
284	1971	Velo de novia	Janete Clair	Ernesto Alonso	

== 1972 ==
#	Year	Title	Author	Director	Ref.
285	1972	Aquí está Felipe Reyes	Antonio Medellín	Miko Vylla	
286	1972	El carruaje	Glória Magadan	Rafael Banquells	
287	1972	El edificio de enfrente	Julio Porter	Guillermo Diazayas	
288	1972	Las fieras	Luisa Xamar	Alfredo Saldaña	
289	1972	Las gemelas	Martha Zavaleta	Ernesto Alonso	
290	1972	Me llaman Martina Sola	Claudia Islas	Arturo Salgado	
291	1972	La señora joven	María Luz Perea	Julio Castillo	

== 1973 ==
#	Year	Title	Author	Director	Ref.
292	1973	Amaras a tu prójimo	Luz María Aguilar	Luis Vega	
293	1973	Cartas sin destino	Julio Alejandro	Julio Castillo	
294	1973	Entre brumas	Fernanda Villeli	Julio Castillo	
295	1973	La hiena	Caridad Bravo Adams	Ernesto Alonso	
296	1973	El honorable Señor Valdez	Mimí Bechelani	Manolo García	
297	1973	Los que ayudan a Dios	Mimí Bechelani	Luis Vega	
298	1973	Mi primer amor	Mimí Bechelani	Antulio Jimenéz Pons	
299	1973	Mi rival	Inés Rodena	Valentín Pimstein	
300	1973	Los miserables	David Antón	Antulio Jimenéz Pons	
301	1973	Nosotros los pobres	Narciso Busquets	Enrique Segoviano	
302	1973	Penthouse	Julio Porter	Raúl Araiza	
303	1973	¿Quién?	Silvia Derbez	Joaquín Cordero	
304	1973	La tierra	Marissa Garrido	Ernesto Alonso	

== 1974 ==
#	Year	Title	Author	Director	Ref.
305	1974	Ana del aire	Fernanda Villeli	Ernesto Alonso	
306	1974	El chofer	Mimí Bechelani	Alfredo Saldaña	
307	1974	Extraño en su pueblo	Celia Alcántara	Julio Castillo	
308	1974	Ha llegado una intrusa	Marissa Garrido	Manolo García	
309	1974	El juramento	Marga López	Guillermo Diazayas	
310	1974	El manantial del milagro	Vicente Leñero	Julio Castillo	
311	1974	Marina	Silvia Derbez	Jesús Valero	
312	1974	Mundo de juguete	Abel Santacruz	Rafael Banquells	
313	1974	Muñeca	Abel Santacruz	Manolo García	
314	1974	Siempre habrá un mañana	Inés Rodena	Arturo Salgado	

== 1975 ==
#	Year	Title	Author	Director	Ref.
315	1975	Barata de primavera	Marissa Garrido	Rafael Banquells	
316	1975	Lo imperdonable	Caridad Bravo Adams	Ernesto Alonso	
317	1975	El milagro de vivir	Angélica María	Raúl Araiza	
318	1975	Paloma	Marissa Garrido	Ernesto Alonso	
319	1975	Pobre Clara	Carmen Daniels	Valentín Pimstein	
320	1975	Ven conmigo	Celia Alcántara	Luis Vega	

== 1976 ==
#	Year	Title	Author	Director	Ref.
321	1976	Los bandidos del río frío	Julissa	Antulio Jimenéz Pons	
322	1976	Mañana será otro día	Marissa Garrido	Ernesto Alonso	
323	1976	Mi hermana la nena	Blanca Sánchez	Rafael Banquells	
324	1976	Mundos opuestos	Marissa Garrido	Ernesto Alonso	

== 1977 ==
#	Year	Title	Author	Director	Ref.
325	1977	Acompáñame	Carlos Olmos	Luis Vega	
326	1977	Corazón salvaje	Caridad Bravo Adams	Alfredo Saldaña	
327	1977	Dos a quererse	Thelma Biral	Roberto Denis	
328	1977	Humillados y ofendidos	Carmen Daniels	Rafael Banquells	
329	1977	Marcha nupcial	Inés Rodena	Noé Alcántara	
330	1977	Pacto de amor	Marissa Garrido	Ernesto Alonso	
331	1977	Rina	Inés Rodena	Rafael Banquells	
332	1977	La venganza	Inés Rodena	Rafael Banquells	
333	1977	Yo no pedí vivir	Celia Alcántara	Miguel Córcega	

== 1978 ==
#	Year	Title	Author	Director	Ref.
334	1978	Ardiente secreto	Charlotte Brontë	Julián Pastor	
335	1978	Cartas para una víctima	Alfredo Saldaña	Ernesto Alonso	
336	1978	Doménica Montero	Inés Rodena	Lorenzo de Rodas	
337	1978	Donde termina el camino	Maricruz Olivier	Antulio Jimenéz Pons	
338	1978	Gotita de gente	Raymundo López	Manolo García	
339	1978	La hora del silencio	Gloria Marín	Tony Carbajal	
340	1978	Ladronzuela	Gloria Marín	Fernando Chacón	
341	1978	Mamá campanita	Estella Calderón	Noé Alcántara	
342	1978	María José	Arturo Moya Grau	Miko Vylla	
343	1978	Una mujer	Julio Porter	Tony Carbajal	
344	1978	Muñeca rota	Norma Herrera	Raúl Araiza	
345	1978	No todo lo que brilla es oro	María Rojo	Luis Torner	
346	1978	Pasiones encendidas	Fernanda Villeli	Alfredo Saldaña	
347	1978	Pecado de amor	Marissa Garrido	Ernesto Alonso	
348	1978	Rosalía	Lilia Michel	Noé Alcántara	
349	1978	Rosario de amor	Pedro Armendáriz Jr.	Enrique Gómez Vadillo	
350	1978	Santa	Federico Gamboa	Miguel Sabido	
351	1978	Un original y veinte copias	Julio Porter	Paty Juarez	
352	1978	Viviana	Inés Rodena	Rafael Banquells	

== 1979 ==
#	Year	Title	Author	Director	Ref.
353	1979	El amor llegó más tarde	Carlos Olmos	Miguel Sabido	
354	1979	Amor prohibido	Fernanda Villeli	Alfredo Saldaña	
355	1979	Añoranza	Mimí Bechelani	Martha Zavaleta	
356	1979	Bella y Bestia	Carlos Ancira	Alfredo Saldaña	
357	1979	El cielo es para todos	Fernanda Villeli	Ricardo Blume	
358	1979	Cumbres Borrascosas	Charlotte Brontë	Ernesto Alonso	
359	1979	Elisa	Raquel Olmedo	José Morris	
360	1979	El enemigo	Raquel Olmedo	Ernesto Alonso	
361	1979	Honrarás a los tuyos	Irma Lozano	Lorenzo de Rodas	
362	1979	J.J. Juez	Arturo Moya Grau	Lorenzo de Rodas	
363	1979	Julia	Carlos Olmos	Julio Castillo	
364	1979	Lágrimas negras	Inés Rodena	Lorenzo de Rodas	
365	1979	La llama de tu amor	Ana Martín	Rafael Banquells	
366	1979	Mi amor frente al pasado	Blanca Sánchez	Carlos Zuñiga	
367	1979	Muchacha de barrio	Fernanda Villeli	Ernesto Alonso	
368	1979	Una mujer marcada	Sasha Montenegro	Alfredo Saldaña	
369	1979	No tienes derecho a juzgarme	Enrique Rocha	José Morris	
370	1979	Parecido al amor	Carmen Daniels	Julio Porter	
371	1979	Los ricos también lloran	Inés Rodena	Rafael Banquells	
372	1979	La señorita Robles y sus hijos	Mauricio Herrera	Noé Alcántara	
373	1979	Vamos juntos	Estella Calderón	Karlos Velázquez	
374	1979	Yara	Marissa Garrido	Ernesto Alonso	
