= Fernanda Villeli =

Mexican writer and activist (1921–2009)

María Ofelia Villenave Garza, known as Fernanda Villeli, (14 May 1921 – 1 February 2009) was a Mexican writer and activist, who was one of the major writers of telenovelas in Mexico. She wrote for series such as Aprendiendo a amar (1980), Extraños caminos del amor (1981), El maleficio (1983), La traición (1984) (with Carmen Daniels), Lo blanco y lo negro (1989), Al filo de la muerte (1991) (with Marcia Yance) and El diario de Daniela (1998/99) (with Marcela Fuentes Beráin) .

== Selected television works ==
=== Original stories ===
- (1958) Senda prohibida
- (1959) El precio del cielo
- (1959) Mi esposa se divorcia
- (1959) Cuidado con el ángel
- (1960) Un rostro en el pasado
- (1963) La mesera
- (1963) La culpa de los padres
- (1964) San Martín de Porres
- (1964) México 1900
- (1966) Espejismo brillaba
- (1966) Amor y orgullo
- (1967) Angustia del pasado
- (1967) Un pobre hombre
- (1967) Obsesión
- (1967) Incertidumbre
- (1968) Tiempo de perdón
- (1970) El Dios de barro
- (1971) Lucía Sombra
- (1973) Ana del aire
- (1973) Entre brumas
- (1975) Lo imperdonable
- (1975) Mundos opuestos
- (1975) El milagro de vivir
- (1976) Mañana será otro día
- (1977) Pacto de amor
- (1978) Pasiones encendidas
- (1978) Pecado de amor
- (1979) Lágrimas de amor
- (1979) Muchacha de barrio
- (1980) Aprendiendo a amar
- (1981) Extraños caminos del amor
- (1983) El maleficio
- (1984) La traición
- (1989) Lo blanco y lo negro
- (1991) Al filo de la muerte
- (1998) El diario de Daniela

=== Adaptations ===
- Las modelos (1963) (original by Abelardo Arias)
- El derecho de nacer (1966) (original by Félix B. Caignet)
- Muchacha italiana viene a casarse (1971) (original by Delia González Márquez)
- Mi rival (1973) (original by Inés Rodena)
- El manantial del milagro (1974) (original by Vicente Leñero)
- El derecho de nacer (1981) (original by Félix B. Caignet)
- El engaño (1986) (original by Caridad Bravo Adams)
- Morir para vivir (1989) (original by Félix B. Caignet)
- La sonrisa del Diablo (1992) (original by Luisa Xammar)
- Azul (1996) (original by Pinkye Morris)
- La casa en la playa (2000) (original by Enrique Gómez Vadillo)
- El derecho de nacer (2001) (original by Félix B. Caignet)

=== Remakes written herself ===
- El dolor de amar (1966) (remake of Senda prohibida)
- El cielo es para todos (1979) (remake of San Martín de Porres)
- Amor prohibido (1979) (remake of Senda prohibida)
- Corazones sin rumbo (1980) (remake of La mesera)
