= José Elías Moreno Jr. =

Mexican actor

José Elías Moreno
- Born: José Elías Moreno González de Cossío; June 13, 1956 (age 70); Mexico City, Mexico
- Occupation: Actor
- Years active: 1976–present
- Spouse: Maru de Moreno (?-?)
- Children: 3
- Parent(s): José Elías Moreno; Beatriz González de Cossío
- Relatives: Beatriz & Angelina Moreno (siblings)

José Elías Moreno (born José Elías Moreno González de Cossío on June 13, 1956, in Mexico City, Mexico) is a Mexican actor.

Moreno was born June 13, 1956, in Mexico City, Mexico. He is son of José Elías Moreno, actor of the Golden Age of Mexican cinema and Beatriz González de Cossío. He has two sisters, Beatriz, she also actress and Angelina Moreno. He was orphaned by parents at thirteen after the death of both and his maternal grandmother in a car accident.

He married with Maru de Moreno and had three children Elías, María and Andrea.

== Filmography ==
Year	Title	Role	Notes
1976	Supervivientes de los Andes	Rodrigo Fernández	Film
1977	Marcha nupcial	Lacho	Recurring role
1978	Mamá campanita	Polo	Supporting role
1979	Los ricos también lloran	Pascual "Pato" Hernández Acevedo	Supporting role
1979	J.J. Juez	Rodrigo Garmendia	Supporting role
1980	El medio pelo	Cristóbal	
1980	Colorina	Danilo Redes	Recurring role
1981	Soledad	Juan	Recurring role
1982	Déjame vivir	Rafael	Recurring role
1982/83	Bianca Vidal	Enrique Montes	Recurring role
1983	Amalia Batista	Jorge Cardoso	
1983	Coqueta		Film
1983	Niño pobre, niño rico		Film
1984	Principessa	Julio César	Supporting role
1984	Delincuente	Gonzalo	Film
1985	Esperándote	Pablo Moreno	Protagonist
1986	Cicatrices del alma	Alfredo Rivas-Castilla Contreras	Supporting role
1988	Amor en silencio	José María Durán	Supporting role
1988	Un sábado más	El grande/Isauro	Film
1989	Había una vez una estrella		Film
1989	Flor y canela		Recurring role
1990	Amor de nadie	Jorge	Recurring role
1990	Colmillos, el hombre lobo		Film
1990	Un corazón para dos		Film
1991	Latino Bar		Film
1991	Esa mujer me vuelve loco	Carlos	Film
1992	El ganador		Film
1992	Relaciones violentas		Film
1992	Ayúdame compadre		Film
1992	De frente al sol	Armando Morán Mariño	Main cast
1994	Santera	Juan de la Cruz	Film
1995	Si Dios me quita la vida	Raúl Guevara	Supporting role
1995	Santo Enredo	Rigoberto Lukas	Film
1996	Morir dos veces	Aarón Zermeño	Supporting role
1996	Sentimientos Ajenos	José María de la Huerta	Supporting role
1996/97	Mi querida Isabel	Manuel Rivas	Supporting role
1997	Hotel Paraíso		TV series
1998	Ángela	Padre Martín Villanueva	Supporting role
1999	Inesperado amor		Film
1999	Cuento de Navidad	Eleuterio López "Lopitos"	Mini-TV series
2000	Mujer, casos de la vida real		TV series
2000/01	Primer amor... a mil por hora	Esteban Luna	Supporting role
2001	Diseñador ambos sexos	Entrepreneur	TV series Episode: La supervivencia del más apto
2001	Güereja de mi vida		Director
2002	La familia P. Luche	Tío Diodoro	TV series
2002/03	Clase 406	Manuel del Moral	Supporting role
2003	La hija del caníbal	Ramón	Film
2004	Rubí	Genaro Duarte	Supporting role
2005	Sueños y caramelos	Mauro	Supporting role
2005	Bajo el mismo techo	José "Pepe" Acosta	TV series
2006	Heridas de amor	Francisco Jiménez	Supporting role
2007	Pasión	Alberto Lafont y Espinoza	
2008	Juro Que Te Amo	Rogelio Urbina	Supporting role
2009	Camaleones	Armando Jaramillo	Supporting role
2010	Niña de mi corazón	Benigno Paz	Supporting role
2011	Ni contigo ni sin ti	Dr. Esteban Lieja	Director; Special appearance
2012	Amor bravío	Leoncio Martínez	Supporting role
2012/13	La mujer del Vendaval		Director
2013/14	Quiero Amarte	Mauro Montesinos	Co-protagonist
2014/15	La sombra del pasado	Antonio Santos	Director; Special appearance
2016	El hotel de los secretos	Juez	Special appearance
2016	Sin rastro de ti	Raúl Santillana	Supporting role
2016	Corazón que miente		Director
2018	Tenías que ser tú		Director
2018	Por amar sin ley	Joel Muñiz	Special appearance
2019	El dragón	Lamberto Garza	Supporting role
2019/20	Médicos	Gonzalo Olmedo	Supporting role
2020/21	Vencer el desamor	Joaquín Falcón	Special appearance
2021	Fuego ardiente	Padre Mateo	Recurring Role
2021	Diseñando tu amor	Horacio Fuentes	Supporting role
2022	Amor dividido	Domingo Moreno	Supporting role
2022	La madrastra	Santino	

== Awards and nominations ==
Year	Award	Category	Telenovela	Result
1985	TVyNovelas Awards	Best Antagonist Actor	Amalia Batista	Nominated
1993	TVyNovelas Awards	Best Antagonist Actor	De frente al sol	Won
2008	TVyNovelas Awards	Best Antagonist Actor	Pasión	Nominated
2011	TVyNovelas Awards	Best Leading Actor	Niña de mi corazón	Nominated
2013	TVyNovelas Awards	Best Leading Actor	Amor bravío	Nominated
2015	TVyNovelas Awards	Best Leading Actor	Quiero Amarte	Nominated
2016	TVyNovelas Awards	Best Direction	La sombra del pasado	Nominated
2017	TVyNovelas Awards	Best Antagonist Actor	Sin rastro de ti	Nominated
2007	Califa de Oro Awards	Best Performance of the Year	Pasión	Won
2008	Bravo Awards	Generic Supporting Male Performance	Pasión	Won
2008	ACPT Awards	Best Acting Ensemble	Doce en Pugna	Won
2009	ACE Awards	Best Male Co-performance	Pasión	Won
