= Lorenzo de Rodas =

- Born: Lorenzo López de Rodas y Martín; August 2, 1930; Madrid, Spain
- Died: December 18, 2011 (aged 81); Cuernavaca, Morelos, Mexico
- Occupations: Actor, director
- Years active: 1954–2009
- Spouse: María Idalia (m. 1953)
- Children: Leonardo Daniel

Lorenzo de Rodas (August 2, 1930 – December 18, 2011) was a Spanish actor and film director who participated in several telenovelas and Mexican movies.

== Biography ==
He was married to the actress María Idalia, who has a son named Leonardo Daniel who is also an actor.

He died on December 18, 2011, in Cuernavaca, Morelos, of natural causes.

== Filmography ==
=== As actor ===
Television and films
Year	Title	Role	Notes
1954	Festin para la muerte		Film
1957	Pablo and Carolina	Carlos	Film
1958	Un paso al abismo		TV Debut
1961	Sobre el muerto las coronas	Doctor Luis	Film
1961	La insaciable		TV series
1961	Las víctimas		TV series
1961	Leyendas de México		TV series
1970	La constitución		TV series
1970	Aventura		TV series
1975	Barata de primavera	Javier	TV series
1976	Supervivientes de los Andes		Film
1976	Mi hermana la nena	Dr. Castro	TV series
1979	J.J. Juez	Gonzalo	TV series
1985	El ángel caído	Felipe Argumosa de Lizárraga, "El Gallo"	TV series
1993	Fray Bartolomé de las Casas		Film
1994	Días de combate	El Mago	Film
1995	Alondra		TV series
1995	Algunas nubes		Film
1996	La antorcha encendida	Virrey Pablo de Irigoyen	TV series
1998	Fuera de la ley		Film
1999	Tres mujeres	Vicente Sánchez	TV series
2001	La intrusa	Dr. Adrián Colmenares	TV series
2002	El crimen del padre Amaro	Don Paco de la Rosa	Film
2002	Así son ellas	Don Ramiro Sepúlveda	TV series
2003	Sus demonios		Short
2003	Bajo la misma piel	Agustín Ruiz Canedo	TV series
2005	Club eutanasia	Adalberto	Film
2005	La madrastra	Servando Maldonado	TV series
2008-2009	Central de abasto	Víctor	TV series, (final appearance)

=== As director ===
Director and cinematographer
Year	Title	Notes
1964	El dolor de vivir	Director
1977	Humillados y ofendidos	Cinematographer
1978	Mamá campanita	Director and cinematographer
1978	Doménica Montero	Director
1979	Verónica	Director
1979	Lágrimas negras	Director
1979	J.J. Juez	Director
1979	Honrarás a los tuyos	Director
1980	Sandra y Paulina	Director
1981	Infamia	Director
1987	La indomable	Director
1988	El rincón de los prodigios	Director
1996	Bendita mentira	Director
1997	El secreto de Alejandra	Director
1999	Tres mujeres	Director
