= Verónica (TV series) =

Mexican telenovela

- Genre: Telenovela
- Created by: Inés Rodena
- Written by: Vivian Pestalozzi
- Directed by: Fernando Chacón
- Starring: Julissa; Ricardo Blume; Aldo Monti; Christian Bach
- Theme music composer: Meco
- Opening theme: Moondancer
- Country of origin: Mexico
- Original language: Spanish
- No. of episodes: 100

Production
- Executive producer: Valentín Pimstein
- Cinematography: Lorenzo de Rodas; Rafael Banquells
- Running time: 30 minutes

Original release
- Network: Canal de las Estrellas
- Release: 1980

Related
- Sin ti (1997)

Verónica is a Mexican telenovela produced by Valentín Pimstein for Televisa in 1980.

== Cast ==
- Julissa as Verónica
- Ricardo Blume as César
- Aldo Monti as Federico
- Christian Bach as María Teresa
- Ariadne Welter as Herminia
- María Rivas as Marcelina
- Elsa Cárdenas as Leonor
- Nelly Meden as Esther
- Martha Verduzco as Katy
- Alejandra Peniche as Malina
- Yuri as Norma
- Lola Tinoco as Petrita
- Roberto Ballesteros as Lisandro
- Lupelena Goyeneche as Domitila
