= Ha llegado una intrusa =

Mexican telenovela

- Genre: Telenovela
- Created by: Marissa Garrido
- Directed by: Manolo García
- Starring: Jacqueline Andere; Joaquín Cordero; Silvia Pasquel; Virginia Gutiérrez
- Opening theme: "Papillón" by Jerry Goldsmith
- Country of origin: Mexico
- Original language: Spanish

Production
- Executive producer: Valentín Pimstein

Original release
- Network: Canal de las Estrellas
- Release: 1974

Related
- El honorable Señor Valdez; Pobre Clara; Vida robada (1991)

Ha llegado una intrusa (English: An Intruder Has Come) is a Mexican telenovela produced by Valentín Pimstein for Canal de las Estrellas in 1974. Jacqueline Andere and Joaquín Cordero star as the protagonists, while Silvia Pasquel and Virginia Gutiérrez star as the antagonists.

== Plot ==
Alicia Bernal is an honest and good young woman who has lived her entire life in a boarding school in Mexico City. She has studied thanks to a mysterious person who pays the bills, but Alicia has never known who it is because she is an orphan and the only person who has is her friend Hilda Moreno Sainz. However, this friendship is strange.

== Cast ==
- Jacqueline Andere as Alicia Bernal / Hilda Moreno Sáinz
- Joaquín Cordero as Ingeniero Carlos Morán
- Silvia Pasquel as Hilda Moreno Sáinz / Verónica
- Rafael Banquells as Don Rafael Moreno
- Virginia Gutiérrez as Virginia Moreno
- Rogelio Guerra as Gabino
- Rosario Granados as Daniela
- Héctor Gómez as Cuco
- Augusto Benedico as Ingeniero Ernesto Lascuráin
- Angelines Fernández as Carmelita
- Alma Muriel as Nelly Carvajal
- Patricia Aspíllaga as Margarita
- Raúl "Chato" Padilla as Yando
- Carmen Salas as Esperanza
- Ricardo Cortés as Luis
- Claudio Obregón as Dr. Rubén Carvajal
- Wally Barrón as Pancho
- Miguel Suárez as Herminio
- Emma Grise as Juana
- Carlos East as Tony
- Rocío Banquells
