= Otto Sirgo =

Cuban-Mexican actor (1946–2026)

- Born: 19 December 1946; Havana, Cuba
- Died: 29 September 2026 (aged 79)
- Occupation: Actor

Otto Sirgo Haller (Spanish pronunciation: [ˈoto ˈsiɾɣo], 19 December 1946 – 29 September 2026) was a Cuban actor and director based in Mexico. He was known for his roles in Mexican telenovelas for almost five decades. Born in Havana, Cuba, he was the son of Cuban actor Otto Sirgo Prieto and Mexican actress Magda Haller. Sirgo was married to actress Maleni Morales until her death in 2020.

Sirgo died on 29 September 2026, at the age of 79.

== Telenovelas ==
- El precio de la fama (2026) Telenovela ... Eugenio Urrutia
- Doménica Montero (2025/26) Telenovela ... Juez
- Juegos interrumpidos (2024) Telenovela ... Pedro
- Eternamente amándonos (2023) Telenovela ... Gabriel Garibay
- Vencer el pasado (2021) Telenovela ... Eusébio Valencia
- Falsa identidad (2020) Telenovela ... Plácido Arismendi "El Apá"
- Preso No. 1 (2019) Telenovela ... Benito Rivas
- Ringo (2019) Telenovela ... Iván Garay Beltrán
- Enemigo íntimo (2018) Telenovela ... Nemesio Rendón
- Tres veces Ana (2016) Telenovela ... Rodrigo Casasola
- Lo que la vida me robó (2014) Telenovela ... Regino
- Quiero amarte (2013) Telenovela ... Manuel Olazabal
- Cachito de cielo (2012) Telenovela ... Gustavo Mendiola
- Por ella soy Eva (2012) Telenovela ... Jesus Legarreta
- Ni contigo ni sin ti (2011) Telenovela ... Octavio Torreslanda
- Sortilegio (2009) Telenovela .... Jorge Krueger
- Un gancho al corazón (2008/09) Telenovela ... Salvador Ulloa
- Palabra de mujer (2007/08) Telenovela .... Mariano Álvarez y Junco
- Amor sin maquillaje (2007) Telenovela
- Amar sin límites (2006/07) Telenovela .... Alfredo Toscano
- La esposa virgen (2005) Telenovela .... Dr. Misael Mendoza
- Mujer de madera (2004/05) Telenovela .... Leopoldo Rebollar
- Niña amada mía (2003) Telenovela .... Arquitecto Octavio Uriarte
- El juego de la vida (2001/02) Telenovela .... Javier Álvarez
- Por un beso (2000/01) Telenovela .... Julio Otero Robles / Gonzalo Ruiz de Cota
- DKDA: Sueños de juventud (1999/2000) Telenovela .... Eduardo Arias
- Alma rebelde (1999) Telenovela .... Don Marcelo Rivera Hill
- Una luz en el camino (1998) Telenovela .... Padre Federico
- El secreto de Alejandra (1997) Telenovela .... Carlos
- Lazos de amor (1995/96) Telenovela .... Eduardo Rivas
- Buscando el paraíso (1993) Telenovela .... Don Ángel
- Tenías que ser tú (1993) Telenovela .... Tasio Sarachaga
- Alcanzar una estrella II (1991) Telenovela .... Alejandro Loredo
- Morir para vivir (1989) Telenovela .... Sebastián Quijano
- Rosa salvaje (1987/88) Telenovela .... Ángel de la Huerta
- Cautiva (1986) Telenovela .... Daniel
- Vivir enamorada (1982) Telenovela .... Andres
- Un solo corazón (1983) Telenovela .... Óscar Padilla
- Juegos del destino (1981) Telenovela .... José Luis Morantes, Jr.
- Juventud (1980) Telenovela .... Rafael
- Mamá campanita (1978) Telenovela .... Enrique
- La venganza (1977) Telenovela .... Alfonso del Olmo
- Rina (1977) Telenovela .... Omar
- Barata de primavera (1975) Telenovela .... Antonio Prado
- Marina (1974) Telenovela
- El honorable Señor Valdez (1973) Telenovela
- Entre brumas (1973) Telenovela .... Enrico Petrini
- Los miserables (1973) Telenovela .... Felix Tholomyes
- Las gemelas (1972) Telenovela
- Me llaman Martina Sola (1972) Telenovela
- El amor tiene cara de mujer (1971) Telenovela .... Julio
- La cruz de Marisa Cruces (1970) Telenovela .... Héctor
- Honor y orgullo (1969) Telenovela

== Theater ==
- Confesiones de una güera oxigenada (2005)
- El otro rostro de Dios (2003)
- Desencuentros (2002)
- Yo odio a Hamlet as John Barrymore
- La Dama de Negro
- P.D. Tu Gato ha Muerto ("P.S. Your Cat Is Dead", 1997–2000) as Jimmy
- Violinista en el Tejado ("Fiddler on the Roof")
- Alta Seducción
- Intruso de Media Noche
- Mi Quinto Amor
- El prisionero de la Segunda Avenida
- ¡Atrápame si Puedes!
- Los Japoneses no Esperan

== Television shows ==
- No empujen
- Dos mujeres en mi casa as a director

== Awards ==
=== Premios TVyNovelas ===
- Best Supporting Actor for Lazos de amor (1996)

=== Association of Theater Journalists ===
- Best Monologue for El otro Rostro de Dios
