= Sylvia Pasquel =

Mexican actress (born 1950)

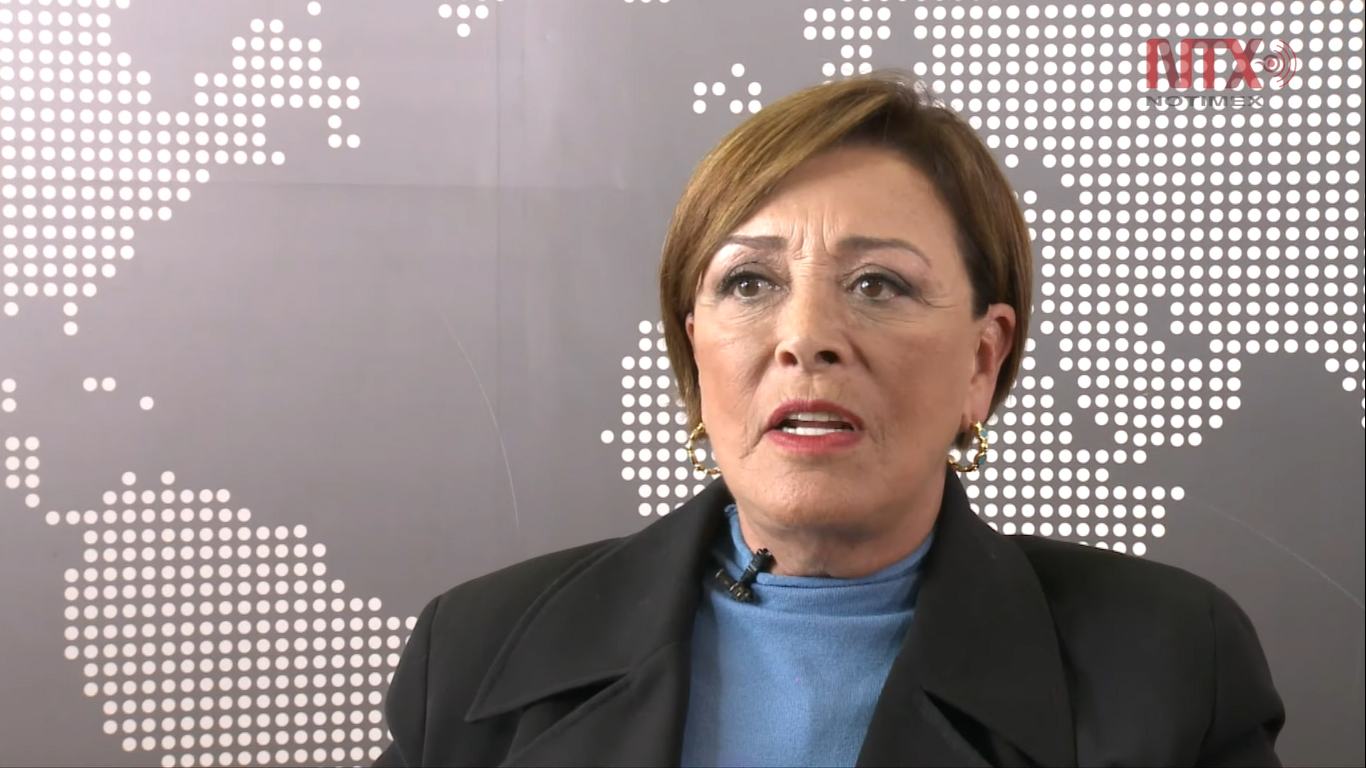
- Born: Sylvia Banquells Pinal; 13 October 1950 (age 76); Mexico City, Mexico
- Occupation: Actress
- Years active: 1968-present
- Spouse(s): Mike Salas (m. 1966; div. 1970) Fernando Frade (m. 1983; div. 1985) Rodolfo Soberanis (m. 2000; div. 2001)
- Children: 2, incluinding Stephanie Salas
- Parent(s): Rafael Banquells; Silvia Pinal
- Family: Rocío Banquells (half sister); Alejandra Guzmán (half sister); Frida Sofía (half niece)

Sylvia Banquells Pinal (born 13 October 1950), known professionally as Sylvia Pasquel, is a Mexican actress.

== Career ==
=== 1960s ===
At the age of nineteen, Pasquel did her first movie, El Despertar del Lobo (The Wolf's Awakening). That movie was made in 1968, the year in which Pasquel became very famous in Mexico. She followed her first film with her telenovela debut, in Los Inconformes (The Nonconformists).

In 1969, she took part in a movie about wrestling, starring alongside Santo and his wrestling enemy, Blue Demon, in Santo Contra Blue Demon en la Atlantida (Santo versus Blue Demon in Atlantis). She also appeared in two other films in 1969, Una Mujer Honesta (An Honest Woman) and La Casa del Farol Rojo (The Redlight House).

=== 1970s ===
The decade of the 1970s was a very busy one for Pasquel, as she starred in multiple films, soap operas, and even in magazine soaps, which were popular in Latin America then. In 1970, she starred in Me he de comer esa tuna (I Shall Eat That Prickly Pear), La Cruz de Mariza Cruzes (Mariza Cruzes' Cross) and in El Mariachi, the only telenovela she did that year.

In 1971, she played "Gianna Donatti" in the telenovela Muchacha Italiana Viene a Casarse (Italian Girl Comes to Get Married) with Angélica María. That soap opera was a major hit, and Pasquel followed her work there with another telenovela, La Recogida (The Step-Daughter). Her one movie in 1971 was Secreto de Confesion (Confession Secret). 1972 proved to be a relatively easy year for Pasquel, whose fame had already spread to the rest of Latin America and among Hispanics in the United States. She participated in only one movie and no soap operas. Her movie that year was named Cinco Mil Dolares de Recompensa (Five Thousand Dollars Reward).

She participated alongside Chabelo, a very popular children's actor of the era, in 1973's Chabelo y Pepito contra los Monstruos (Chabelo and Pepito Against the Monsters). This was followed by another telenovela, El Amor Tiene Cara de Mujer (Love has a Woman's Face). She finished 1973 playing "Maritza" in "Mi Rival" (My Rival).

Pasquel did two soap operas in 1974, each of which proved to be important in her career: in Ha LLegado una Intrusa (An Intruder has Arrived, remade during the 1990s as La Usurpadora), she played two roles in the same drama for the first time in her career, acting as twins "Veronina and Hilda Moreno". Mundo de Juguete (Toy World), meanwhile, became one of the most successful Mexican telenovelas of the era.

After El Milagro de Vivir (The Miracle of Living), a 1975 soap opera, Pasquel began slowing her on screen work rate, and she took 1976 off to return in 1977, with another soap opera, named Humillados y Ofendidos (Humiliated and Offended). Once again, she took a full year off the screens in 1978 and returned in 1979 with a movie named Johnny Chicano and a soap named J.J. Juez.

=== 1980s ===
By the 1980s, Pasquel was already a family woman, a fact which contributed to a further slowdown of her screen career. She participated in 1980's Al Rojo Vivo (loosely translated to Very Red), in 1982's El Amor Nunca Muere (Love Never Dies), 1983's Cuando los Hijos se Van (When Children Leave), and 1987's Los Años Perdidos (The Lost Years).

She took off three more years after that, returning in 1990 to participate in one episode of the popular television show, Mujer, Casos de la Vida Real, which is hosted by her mother, Silvia Pinal. The chapter she appeared in was based on a real-life story of a rape victim. Soon after, she made another telenovela, Dias sin Luna (Days Without a Moon). Her return to soap operas was followed by her return to film, with two movies made in 1991: Politico por Error (Politician by Mistake) and Asalto (Robbery).

=== 1990s ===
In 1990, a teen-oriented soap opera, Alcanzar una estrella (Reaching a Star), with Eduardo Capetillo, had become a major hit on Mexican television. Pasquel acted in that production's 1991 sequel, Alcanzar una estrella II, where she acted alongside Capetillo, Sasha Sokol and a budding Puerto Rican star named Ricky Martin.

She followed that with 1993's Las Secretas Intenciones (Secret Intentions). and 1995's comedy film El Superman....Dilon Dos (The Super....lacy one, Part Two). In 1996, she participated in Para Toda la Vida (Forever), which was another telenovela. She returned once again in 1998's Huracan, where she played "Caridad".

It was also in 1993 that Pasquel's handprints were embedded into the Paseo de las Luminarias alongside those of her mother and second stepfather as she was honored for her contributions to television. Their handprints would be joined in 2013 by those of Pasquel's sister, Alejandra Guzmán

=== 2000s ===
She starred as "Zulema" in 2000's Mi Destino Eres Tu (You Are My Destiny).

In 2001, she participated in another major Mexican telenovela hit, El Manantial (The Cascade). That same year, she played as "Silvia" in Aventuras en el Tiempo (Time Adventures). During 2002, she participated in a very large number of episodes of Mujer, Casos de la Vida Real.

She also participated, as of 2005, in the Mexican soap opera Amarte es mi Pecado (My Sin is Loving You).

Her latest appearance was, as of 2008, in the soap opera Yo amo a Juan Querendón.

On stage, Pasquel had great success in 1979 in the play Claudia me quieren volver loco.

=== 2010s ===
In 2013, Pasquel signed to star in Qué pobres tan ricos from the hit producer of Por Ella Soy Eva, Rosy Ocampo.

=== 2020s ===
In 2022, Pasquel appeared on Netflix's Siempre reinas ("Forever Queens") to star in Qué pobres tan ricos from the hit producer of Por Ella Soy Eva, Rosy Ocampo.

== Filmography ==
=== Films ===
Year	Title	Role	Notes
1970	El despertar del lobo	Sivia	Debut film
1970	Santo contra Blue Demon en la Atlantida	Juno	
1971	Secreto de confesión	Mayte	
1973	Chabelo y Pepito contra los monstruos	Alicia	
1973	El amor tiene cara de mujer	Cristina	
1974	Cinco mil dolares de recompensa	Claire	
1979	Discotec fin de semana	Susana	
1981	Johnny Chicano	Raquel	
1990	Violaciónes, casos de la vida real	Susana	
1991	Asalto	Alde	
2001	Padres culpables	Susana	
2015	La calle de la amargura	Doa Epi	
2019	Devil Between the Legs	Beatriz	Nominated - Ariel Award for Best Actress

=== Television ===
Year	Title	Role	Notes
1968	Los inconformes	Unknown role	
1970	La cruz de Marisa Cruces	Young Marisa Cruces	
1970	El mariachi	Unknown role	
1971	Muchacha italiana viene a casarse	Gianna Donatti	
1971	La recogida	Alicia	
1971	El rabo verde	Unknown role	
1973	Mi rival	Unknown role	
1974	Mundo de juguete	Elvira	
1974	Ha llegado una intrusa	Hilda Moreno	
1975	El milagro de vivir	Hortencia Alvarado	
1977	Humiliated and Insulted	Unknown role	
1979	J.J. Juez	Unknown role	
1980	Al rojo vivo	Tina	Villana
1982	El amor nunca muere	Carolina	
1983	Cuando los hijos se van	Teresa	
1987	Los años perdidos	Unknown role	
1990–2004	Mujer, casos de la vida real	Various role	13 episodes
1990	La telaraña	Unknown role	Episode: "Una dama para dos"
1990	Días sin luna	Laura	Villana
1991	Alcanzar una estrella II	Paulina Muriel Loredo	Villana
1993	Las secretas intenciones	Olivia Cardenal	Villana
1995	Lazos de amor	Herself	
1996	Para toda la vida	Lidia	
1998	Huracán	Caridad	
1998	¿Qué nos pasa?	Unknown role	Season 1, episode 28
2000	Mi destino eres tú	Zulema Fernández	
2001	El manantial	Pilar Luna	
2001	Diseñador ambos sexos	Unknown role	Episode: "Madres"
2001	Aventuras en el tiempo	La Barbura	
2003	La hora pico: El reventón	Unknown role	Television film
2004	Amarte es mi pecado	Isaura Ávila de Guzmán	Villana
2007	Yo amo a Juan Querendón	Nidia Estela de la Cueva Pérez de Cachón	
2012	Como dice el dicho	Lucrecia	"Quien se fía de un lobo..." (Season 2, Episode 64)
2013	Durmiendo con mi jefe	Doña Lidia de Briones	
2014	Misterio's	Isaura	"El vestido de novia" (Season 1, Episode 1)
2013–2014	Qué pobres tan ricos	Ana Sofía Romagnoli Tolentino de Ruizpalacios	
2015–2016	Antes muerta que Lichita	Elsa	
2025	Juegos de amor y poder	Sofía Durán	

== See also ==
- Stephanie Salas
- Silvia Pinal
- Alejandra Guzmán
- Rocío Banquells
