= Gotita de gente =

Mexican telenovela

- Official logo
- Genre: Telenovela
- Created by: Raimundo López
- Written by: Luis Reyes de la Maza
- Directed by: Lorenzo de Rodas; Rafael Banquells; Manolo García
- Starring: Graciela Mauri; Liliana Abud; Jorge Ortiz de Pinedo; Alicia Rodríguez; Raúl "Chato" Padilla; Mercedes Pascual
- Opening theme: "Concert from the Stars"
- Ending theme: "Concert from the Stars"
- Composer: Bebu Silvetti
- Country of origin: Mexico
- Original language: Spanish

Production
- Executive producer: Valentín Pimstein

Original release
- Network: Canal de las Estrellas
- Release: April 28 – September 8, 1978

Related
- Mundo de juguete; Chispita; Pingo de gente (1971) Gotita de amor (1998)

Gotita de gente (English: Droplet People), is a Mexican children's telenovela, which was produced by Valentín Pimstein for Televisa in 1978. Stars in it included main actors Graciela Mauri, Liliana Abud and Jorge Ortiz de Pinedo.

Is an adaptation of the Brazilian telenovela "Pingo (small, the word "pingo" has different connotations across Latin America) de gente", which was produced in 1971 by Raimundo López.

== Plot ==
Little Ana María is snatched a few days after her birth from the arms of her mother Martha, a young woman, and is then taken to an orphanage located in the town of San Juan del Río. Nine years later the girl, tired of the abuse that has been in place at the orphanage, escapes and hides in a truck that takes her to Mexico City, arriving in a neighborhood where young Juan Bautista Martínez, who finds the girl sleeping in a hard position inside the truck, lives at.

== Cast ==
- Graciela Mauri as Ana María
- Liliana Abud as Martha Rivera Valdés
- Jorge Ortiz de Pinedo as Juan Bautista Martínez
- Alicia Rodríguez as Doña Margarita
- Raúl "Chato" Padilla as Tacho
- Mercedes Pascual as Doña Carlota
- Leticia Perdigón as Sofía
- Martha Ofelia Galindo as Teresa
- Juan Verduzco as Eugenio
- Sergio Ramos "El Comanche" as Clodomiro
- Estela Chacón as Hermana Marcela
- Jorge Mateos as José
- Rafael del Río as Flavio
- María Idalia
- Pancho Müller
- Angelines Fernández
- Rafael Banquells

== See also ==
- Chiquititas
- Chispita
- Luz Clarita
- Gotita de amor
