= Soledad (TV series) =

- Genre: Telenovela
- Created by: Original Story: Inés Rodena; Adaptation: Tere Medina; Vivian Pestalozzi
- Written by: Carlos Romero
- Directed by: Rafael Banquells
- Starring: Libertad Lamarque; Edith González; Héctor Bonilla
- Theme music composer: Javier Ortega
- Opening theme: "Alma mía" by Libertad Lamarque
- Country of origin: Mexico
- Original language: Spanish
- No. of episodes: 284

Production
- Executive producer: Valentín Pimstein
- Cinematography: Noé Alcantará
- Running time: 30 minutes

Original release
- Network: Canal de las Estrellas
- Release: 1980

Related
- Aprendiendo a amar; El derecho de nacer (1981); Corazón de madre (1970); Bendita mentira (1996)

Soledad is a Mexican telenovela produced by Valentín Pimstein for Televisa in 1980.

== Cast ==
- Libertad Lamarque as Soledad
- Salvador Pineda as Andrés Sánchez Fuentes
- Christian Bach as Chelo Sánchez Fuentes
- Héctor Bonilla as Jesús Sánchez Fuentes
- Edith González as Luisita Sánchez Fuentes
- Rosalía Valdés as Daisy
- Roberto Cañedo as Bernardo
- Nuria Bages as Cinthia
- Humberto Zurita as Fernando
- Rafael Baledón as Don Felix
- Rita Macedo as Rebeca
- Connie de la Mora as Marilú
- Manuel Capetillo Jr. as.¡ Ramiro Sánchez Fuentes
- Roberto Spriu as Lic. Garrido
- Pituka de Foronda as Doña Martha
- Rebeca Martínez as Tere
- Ana Silvia Garza as Meche
- Lorena Rivero as Peggy
- Abraham Stavans as Sebastián
- Flor Procuña as Sandra
- Lucianne Silva as Margarita
- Virginia Gutiérrez as Carolina
- Manuel López Ochoa as Guillermo
- Elvira Monsell as Perlita
- Ada Carrasco as Justa
- Orlando Rodríguez as Anselmo Sánchez Fuentes
- Aurora Molina as Laureana
- Aurora Cortes as Eulalia
- José Flores as Nacho
- Rolando Barral as Rolando
- Alicia Encinas as Marian Monterani (Nana)
- Roberto Ballesteros as Martín
- Ana Bertha Espín as Pilar
- Alejandro Camacho
- José Elías Moreno as Juan
