= Los que ayudan a Dios =

Mexican telenovela

- Genre: Telenovela
- Created by: Original Story: Nene Cascallar; Adaptation: Mimí Bechelani
- Directed by: Luis Vega
- Starring: Maricruz Olivier; Kitty de Hoyos; Alicia Rodríguez; Norma Herrera; Fernando Luján; Carlos Alberto Badías; Rafael del Río; Fernando Mendoza; Claudio Obregón; Lupita Lara; Raúl Meraz.
- Opening theme: "Los que ayudan a Dios" by Norma Herrera
- Country of origin: Mexico
- Original language: Spanish

Production
- Executive producer: Valentín Pimstein
- Cinematography: Carlos Lozano Dana

Original release
- Network: Televisa
- Release: 1973

Los que ayudan a Dios (English: Those who help God) is a Mexican telenovela produced by Valentín Pimstein for Televisa in 1973.

== Plot ==
Julia, Martha, Elena and Alicia are four young women who become friends working at the hospital where they are voluntary. Each drags his own fears and personal conflicts between the tragic and depressing environment surrounding the hospital.

== Cast ==
- Maricruz Olivier as Julia
- Kitty de Hoyos as Martha
- Alicia Rodríguez as Elena
- Norma Herrera as Alicia
- Carlos Alberto Badiaz as Diego
- Claudio Obregón as Gustavo
- Enrique Becker as Mauricio
- Fernando Luján as Fernando
- Julieta Bracho as Mayra
- René Muñoz as Dr. César Grajales
- Javier Ruan as Daniel
- Rafael del Río as Luis
- Lupe Lara as Millie
- Raúl Meraz as Horacio
- Ana Lilia Tovar as Mabel
- Elsa Cárdenas as Adriana
- Alicia Bonet as María Isabel
- Fernando Mendoza as Sr. Velazco
- Dolores Camarillo as Magda
- Leopoldo Falcón as Sr. Castro
- Zully Keith as Lola
