= Lágrimas negras =

Lágrimas negras may refer to:

- "Lágrimas negras" (song), a 1929 song composed by the Cuban composer and singer Miguel Matamoros
- Lágrimas Negras (album), a 2003 album by the Cuban pianist Bebo Valdés
- Lágrimas negras (TV series), a Mexican telenovela
