= Rina (TV series) =

- Genre: Telenovela; Drama
- Created by: Original Story; Inés Rodena; Adaptation; Luis Reyes de la Maza
- Directed by: Dimitrio Sarrás
- Starring: Ofelia Medina; Enrique Álvarez Félix; María Rubio; Carlos Ancira; Alicia Rodríguez
- Country of origin: Mexico
- Original language: Spanish
- No. of episodes: 189

Production
- Executive producer: Valentín Pimstein
- Production locations: Mexico City, Mexico
- Cinematography: Fernando Chacón
- Running time: 30 minutes
- Production company: Televisa

Original release
- Network: Canal de las Estrellas
- Release: January 24 – September 23, 1977

Related
- La italianita (1973); Rubí rebelde (1989); María Mercedes (1992); Inocente de Ti (2004); María Esperança (2007); Maria Mercedes (Philippine version) (2013)

Rina is a Mexican telenovela produced by Valentín Pimstein for Televisa. It was written by Inés Rodena and starring Ofelia Medina as a eponymous hunchback, Enrique Álvarez Félix as her love interest and María Rubio as the main villain of the story. It is based on the radionovela "Enamorada".

Rina was broadcast in the United States in 1983 on XETV-TDT in San Diego, a tv station that was licensed by Televisa at the time. along with the other telenovelas "Los Ricos Tambien Lloran" and "Extraños caminos del amor". The telenovela was dubbed under the title "The Broken Doll" under the umbrella "Love and Tears".

== Plot ==
Rina is a poor hunchback woman selling flowers on the streets of Mexico City. She approaches cars at stop-lights to offer her products and she meets an old rich man. He gets acquainted with Rina and eventually manipulates her into marrying him. The old man dies soon afterwards, and Rina is faced with dealing with his greedy sister-in-law Rafaela and her feelings for the son of that woman, Carlos Augusto.

== Cast ==
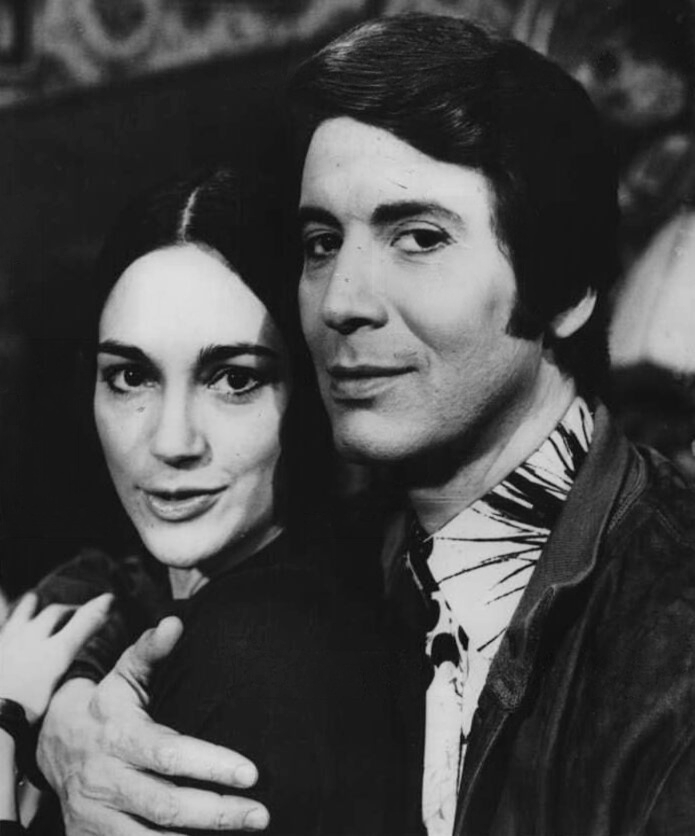
Ofelia Medina and Enrique Álvarez Félix in a publicity photograph for the telenovela

- Ofelia Medina as Rina Galeana de Miranda
- Enrique Álvarez Félix as Carlos Augusto Miranda Carballo
- María Rubio as Doña Rafaela Carballo de Miranda
- Carlos Ancira as Don Leopoldo Miranda
- Alicia Rodríguez as María Julia/Victoria
- Ana Laura Maldonado as Betina
- Rafael Llamas as Carmelo
- Alicia Encinas as Gisela
- Rosa María Moreno as Dionisia Carballo
- Sasha Montenegro as Marcela
- Virginia Gutiérrez as Rosario
- Raúl Meraz as Guillermo
- Guillermo Zarur as Javier
- Otto Sirgo as Omar
- Lupita Lara as Margarita
- Magda Guzmán as Doña Chana
- María Fernanda as Nora
- Javier Ruán as Daniel Galeana
- Olga Breeskin as Silvia
- Demián Bichir as Juanito
- Aurora Molina as Eleuteria
- Rubén Rojo as Rodolfo
- Renata Flores as Renata
- Gerardo del Castillo as Manolo
- Mauricio Ferrari as Lambertie
- Rubén Calderón as Doctor
- Miguel Palmer as Lic. Carrillo
- Salvador Pineda as El Nene
- Daniel Santalucía as Ramiro
- Maricruz Nájera as Nurse
- Queta Lavat as Martha
- Ramiro Orci as El Chato
- Tere Grobois as Doña Adelaida
- Ángela Villanueva as Angelina
- Julián Bravo as Roberto
- Rafael Banquells as Accuser
- Carlos Agostí
- Tony Carbajal as Public Ministry Agent
