= Aquí está Felipe Reyes =

Mexican telenovela

- Genre: Telenovela
- Created by: Francisco Marquez García
- Directed by: Miko Viya
- Starring: Antonio Medellín; Blanca Sánchez
- Country of origin: Mexico
- Original language: Spanish

Production
- Executive producer: Valentín Pimstein
- Cinematography: Miko Viya

Original release
- Network: Televisión Independiente de México
- Release: 1972 – 1972

Aquí está Felipe Reyes is a Mexican telenovela produced by Valentín Pimstein for Televisión Independiente de México in 1972.

== Cast ==
- Antonio Medellín
- Blanca Sánchez
- Alicia Rodríguez
- Virginia Gutiérrez
- Raúl Meraz
- Arturo Benavides
- Sergio Bustamante
- Claudio Obregón
- Roberto Araya
- Guillermo Zarur
- Jorge Mateos
- Justo Martínez
- Héctor Martínez Serrano
