= La insaciable =

Mexican telenovela

- Genre: Telenovela
- Starring: Carmen Montejo; Lorenzo de Rodas; Virginia Gutiérrez
- Country of origin: Mexico
- Original language: Spanish

Original release
- Network: Telesistema Mexicano
- Release: 1961

La insaciable (English: The Insatiable) is a Mexican telenovela produced by Televisa and broadcast by Telesistema Mexicano in 1961.

== Cast ==
- Carmen Montejo
- Lorenzo de Rodas
- Virginia Gutiérrez
- Alfonso Torres
- Alejandro Ciangherotti
- Alejandro Torres
