= El patio de Tlaquepaque =

Mexican telenovela

- Genre: Telenovela
- Created by: Carlos Lozano Dana
- Directed by: José Solé
- Country of origin: Mexico
- Original language: Spanish

Production
- Executive producer: Ernesto Alonso
- Cinematography: Carlos Salinas

Original release
- Network: Telesistema Mexicano
- Release: 1966

El patio de Tlaquepaque is a Mexican telenovela produced by Ernesto Alonso for Telesistema Mexicano in 1966.

== Cast ==
- Susana Freyre
- Miguel Manzano
- Aarón Hernán
- Blanca Torres
- Felipe Santander
- Betty Catania
- Carlos Bracho
- Marina Marín
