= Destino (1963 TV series) =

1963 Mexican telenovela

- Genre: Telenovela
- Created by: Marissa Garrido
- Country of origin: Mexico
- Original language: Spanish

Production
- Executive producer: Rafael Banquells

Original release
- Network: Telesistema Mexicano
- Release: 1963

Destino is a Mexican telenovela produced by Televisa for Telesistema Mexicano in 1963.

== Cast ==
- Carmen Montejo
- Rafael Banquells
- Luis Lara
- Virginia Gutiérrez
- Pilar Sen
- Lucha Altamirano
- Alma Rodriguez
- Maria Wagner
