= Yesenia (1970 TV series) =

- Genre: Telenovela
- Created by: Yolanda Vargas Dulché; Guillermo de la Parra
- Directed by: Fernando Wagner
- Starring: Fanny Cano
- Country of origin: Mexico
- Original language: Spanish

Production
- Executive producer: Valentín Pimstein

Original release
- Network: Telesistema Mexicano
- Release: 1970

Related
- Yesenia (1987)

Yesenia is a Mexican telenovela, produced by Valentín Pimstein for Telesistema Mexicano in 1970.

== Cast ==
- Fanny Cano as Yesenia
- Jorge Lavat as Capitán Oswaldo Leroux
- María Teresa Rivas as Magenta
- Alicia Rodríguez as Marisela
- Irma Lozano as Luisita
- Juan Ferrara as Bardo
- María Douglas as Amparo de Bertier
- Augusto Benedico as Julio Bertier
- Magda Guzmán as Trifenia
- Raúl "Chato" Padilla as El Patriarca Rashay
- Tony Carbajal as Román Flaubert
- Oscar Morelli as Jack Howard
- Lupita Lara as Orlenda

== See also ==
- Yesenia (1971)
- Yesenia (1987 TV series)
