= Virginia Gutiérrez =

Mexican actress (born 1928)

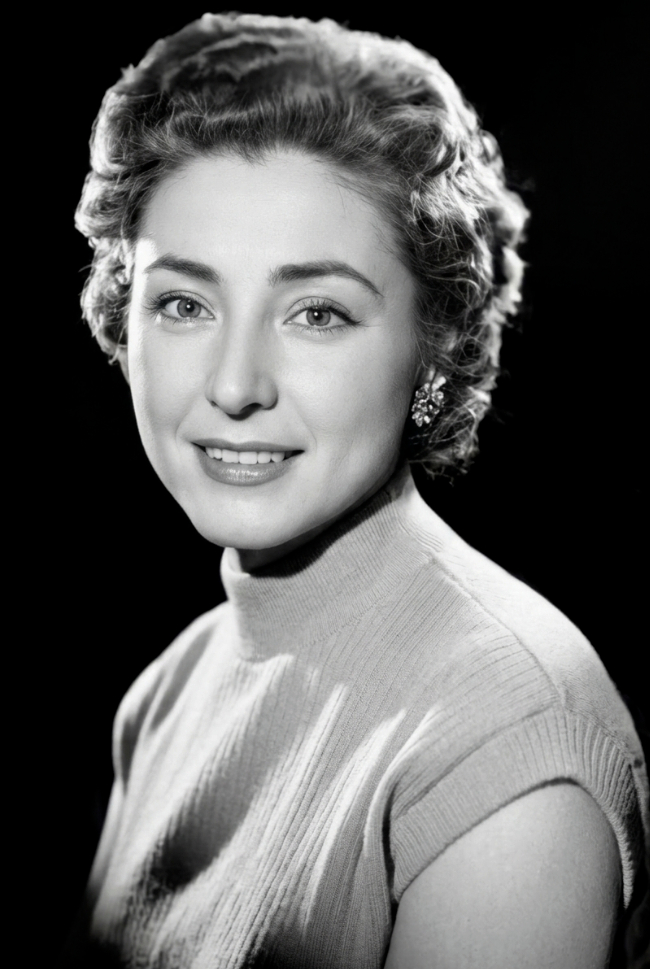
- Gutiérrez in the 1954
- Born: Virginia Gutiérrez Rodríguez; 27 November 1928 (age 97); Gómez Palacio, Durango, Mexico
- Occupation: Actress
- Years active: 1950–2014
- Spouse: Luis Gimeno (m. 1952; died 2017)

Virginia Gutiérrez (born 27 November 1928) is a Mexican actress. She was married to actor Luis Gimeno until his death in 2017.

== Selected filmography ==
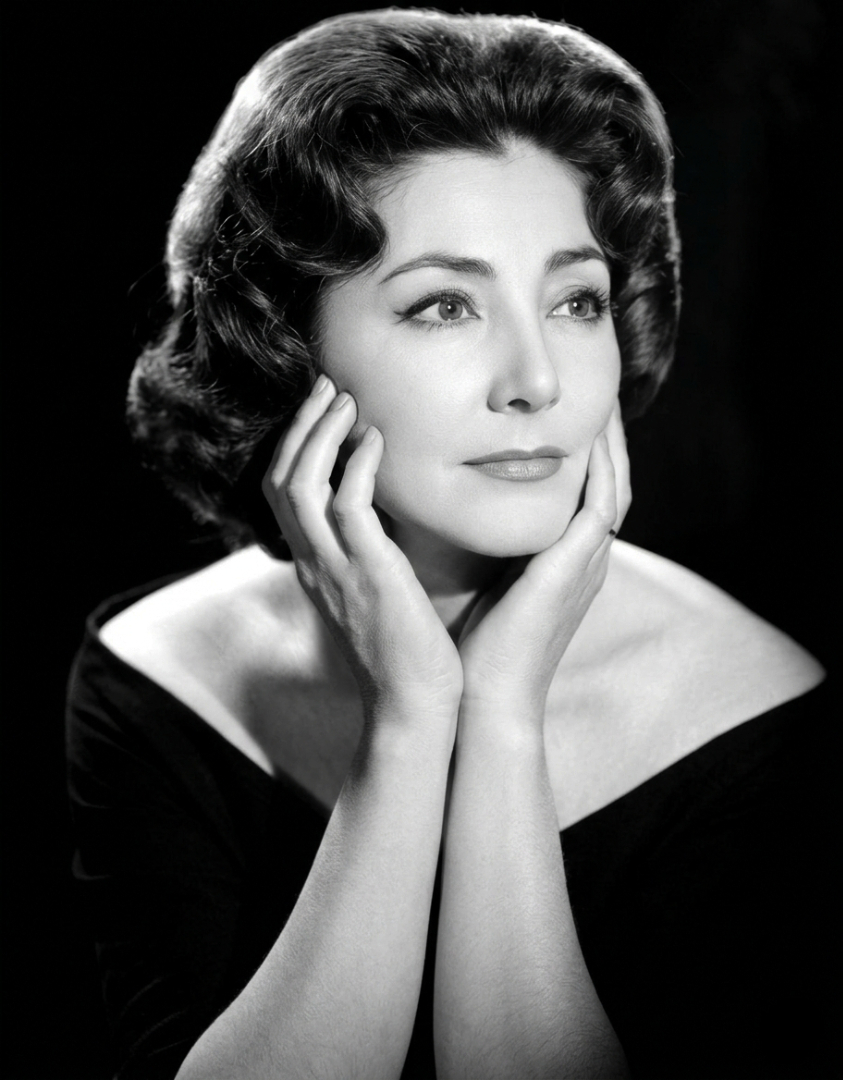
Virginia Gutiérrez in the 1950s

- Abismos de amor (1961)
- La insaciable (1961)
- Destino (1963)
- La sombra del pecado (1966)
- Vértigo (1966)
- Incertidumbre (1967)
- Obsesión (1967)
- Cynthia (1968)
- La familia (1969)
- Aventura (1970)
- Aquí está Felipe Reyes (1972)
- La señora joven (1972)
- Ha llegado una intrusa (1974)
- Rina (1977)
- El cielo es para todos (1979)
- Soledad (1980)
- Vanessa (1982)
- Principessa (1984)
- María Mercedes (1992)
- Bajo un mismo rostro (1995)
- Huracán (1997)
- El Privilegio de Amar (1998)
- La Otra (2002)
- Destilando Amor (2007)
