= El profesor particular =

Mexican telenovela

- Genre: Telenovela; Romance; Drama
- Created by: Julio Alejandro
- Directed by: Manolo García
- Starring: Luz María Aguilar; Isabelita Blanch; Aurora Castillón; Josefina Escobedo
- Country of origin: Mexico
- Original language: Spanish

Production
- Executive producer: Arcadio Gamboa
- Cinematography: Alfredo Saldaña
- Running time: 30 minutes

Original release
- Network: Telesistema Mexicano
- Release: 1971 – 1971

Related
- Pequeñeces; La recogida

El profesor particular (English title:The private professor) is a Mexican telenovela by Televisa produced by Arcadio Gamboa and directed by Manolo García for Telesistema Mexicano. Is original story and adaptation by Julio Alejandro.

== Cast ==
- Luz María Aguilar
- Isabelita Blanch
- Aurora Castillón
- Josefina Escobedo
- Bárbara Gil
- Juan Manuel González
- Miguel Manzano
- Fernando Mendoza
- Ramón Menéndez
- Ricardo Mondragón
- Juan Felipe Preciado
- Alicia Rodríguez
- Dolores Tinoco
- Enrique Álvarez Félix
