= Abismos de amor =

Mexican telenovela

- Genre: Telenovela; Drama
- Created by: Manuel Canseco Noriega
- Directed by: Francisco Jambrina
- Country of origin: Mexico
- Original language: Spanish

Original release
- Network: Telesistema Mexicano
- Release: 1961

Abismos de amor (English: Depths of Love) is a Mexican telenovela created by Manuel Canseco Noriega for Telesistema Mexicano in 1961.

== Cast ==
- Luis Beristáin
- Virginia Gutiérrez
- Maruja Grifell
- Luis Manuel Pelayo
- Nicolás Rodríguez
