= Enrique Novi =

Mexican actor

- Born: Enrique Rabinovich Pollack; April 21, 1947 (age 77); Mexico City, Mexico
- Occupation: Actor
- Years active: 1970-2011

Enrique Rabinovich Pollack better known as Enrique Novi (born April 21, 1947, in Mexico City, Mexico), is a Mexican actor.

== Filmography ==
=== Film ===
Films
Year	Title	Role	Notes
1970	Cristo 70	Cholòlo	Debut film
1972	Trio y cuarteto		Segment "Trio"
1972	El vals sin fin		
1973	Novios y amantes		
1974	Los perros de Dios		
1975	La lucha con la pantera	Guillermo	
1975	Bellas de noche	Raúl	
1975	La montaña del diablo	Román Castillo	
1979	Puerto Maldito		
1981	Las mujeres de Jeremías		
1981	Green Ice	Naval Officer	
1988	El penitente	José	
1989	Licence to Kill	Rasmussen	

=== Television ===
Television
Year	Title	Role	Notes
1971	Mis tres amores	Lalo	Supporting role
1971	Lucía Sombra	Román, Galver	Supporting role
1972	La señora joven	Andrés Montiel	Protagonist
1974	Los miserables	Luis	Supporting role
1974	El juramento		Supporting role
1975	Paloma	Gabriel	Supporting role
1975	A Home of Our Own	Adult Julio	TV movie
1976	Mañana será otro día	Felipe	Supporting role
1978	The Next Step Beyond		Episode: "A Matter of Pride"
1978	Hawaii Five-O	Kimo Hameo	Episode: "Angel in Blue"
1978	The American Girls	Juan	Episode: "The Beautiful People Jungle"
1978	Lou Grant	Flores	Episode: "Prisoner"
1979	Honrarás a los tuyos		Protagonist
1980	A Rumor of War	Jose Ramirez	miniseries
1980	Tania	Yaqui	Supporting role
1980	Rumores de guerra	José Ramírez	TV movie
1980	No temas al amor	Raúl Contreras	Protagonist
1981	Juegos del destino	José Antonio	Protagonist
1989	Mi segunda madre	Juan Antonio	Protagonist
1991	Madres egoístas	Pablo Ledesma	Protagonist
1991	Calor tropical		Episode: "The Mariah Connection"
1993	Valentina	Enrique	Supporting role
1994-1998	Acapulco H.E.A.T.	Dr. Javier Luna, Lieutenant Brill	Episode: "Code Name: The Stalking Horse"; Episode: "Code Name: The Killing Club"
1994	Estación ardiente	Nilu Sergio	TV movie
1996	Con toda el alma	Rafael Linares	Supporting role
1997	La chacala	Alfredo	23 episodes
1999	Romántica obsesión	Rogelio	Supporting role
2000	Ellas, inocentes o culpables	Damián	Supporting role
2002	Súbete a mi moto	Federico Guerra	Supporting role
2010-2011	Drenaje profundo	Igor Álvarez	14 episodes
