= Siempre habrá un mañana =

- Genre: Telenovela
- Created by: Original Story: Inés Rodena; Estella Calderón
- Directed by: Arturo Salgado
- Starring: Meche Carreño; Eduardo Alcaraz; Aurora Molina
- Country of origin: Mexico
- Original language: Spanish

Production
- Executive producer: Valentín Pimstein

Original release
- Network: Canal de las Estrellas
- Release: 1974

Related
- María Mercé, La Chinita (1970); El engaño (1986); Laberintos de pasión (1999); Corazón que miente (2016)

Siempre habrá un mañana (English: There's Always Tomorrow), is a Mexican telenovela produced by Valentín Pimstein for Televisa in 1974. Meche Carreño and Eduardo Alcaraz star as the protagonists, while Aurora Molina star as the antagonists.

Is an adaptation of the Venezuelan telenovela "María Mercé, La Chinita" produced in 1970 by Venevisión.

== Plot ==
Plot tells the life of Mercedes a young and humble washerwoman, who one day meets Arturo a young graduate from the capital who has arrived in the village. Arturo and Mercedes fall in love, but he has to return to the capital and she agrees to wait for him. Returning to the capital, Arturo meets a woman of high society who falls in love with him; and out of ambition, he agrees to marry her. Arturo can't tell Mercedes the truth since it would destroy her; however the poor washerwoman learns of her beloved's deception in the worst possible way. Eventually Mercedes finds true love with another man who values her, but there is another obstacle to her happiness, his girlfriend Pilar.

== Cast ==
- Meche Carreño as Mercedes
- Eduardo Alcaraz as Carlos
- Aurora Molina as Pilar
- Malena Doria as Asunción
- Maria Eugenia Avendaño
- Rosa Furman
- Gastón Melo as Arturo
- Mario Casillas
- Eugenia Avendaño
- Alejandro Rey
- Carlos Rotzinger
- Gloria Maestre
