= La sombra del pecado =

Mexican telenovela

- Genre: Telenovela
- Country of origin: Mexico
- Original language: Spanish

Original release
- Network: Telesistema Mexicano
- Release: 1966

La sombra del pecado is a Mexican telenovela produced by Televisa for Telesistema Mexicano in 1966.

== Cast ==
- Silvia Derbez
- Enrique Aguilar
- Virginia Gutiérrez
- Pituka de Foronda
