= El cielo es para todos =

Mexican telenovela

- Genre: Telenovela
- Created by: José María Sánchez Silva; Fernanda Villeli
- Directed by: Ricardo Blume
- Starring: René Muñoz; Diana Torres
- Country of origin: Mexico
- Original language: Spanish
- No. of episodes: 20

Production
- Executive producer: Valentín Pimstein
- Cinematography: Fernando Chacón

Original release
- Network: Canal de las Estrellas
- Release: 1979

Related
- El cielo es para todos (1962); San Martín de Porres (1964); O ceu é de todos (1965)

El cielo es para todos (English: Heaven is for all) is a Mexican telenovela produced by Valentín Pimstein for Televisa in 1979.

Is an adaptation of the Argentine telenovela El cielo es para todos produced in 1962. That in turn is based on the telenovela San Martín de Porres produced in 1964.

== Cast ==
- René Múñoz as San Martín de Porres
- Diana Torres
- Pancho Córdova
- Julieta Egurrola
- Mónica Sánchez Navarro
- Alma Delfina
- Carlos Cámara
- Arturo Rios
- Ivonne Govea
- Virginia Gutiérrez
