= Cita en la gloria =

Mexican telenovela

- Genre: Telenovela
- Created by: Leandro Bravo
- Directed by: Jesús Valero
- Country of origin: Mexico
- Original language: Spanish

Production
- Executive producer: Valentín Pimstein
- Cinematography: Antulio Jiménez Pons

Original release
- Network: Telesistema Mexicano
- Release: 1966

Cita en la gloria is a Mexican telenovela produced by Valentín Pimstein for Telesistema Mexicano in 1966.

== Cast ==
- Ángel Garasa
- Guillermo Orea
- Leonorilda Ochoa
- Andrea Palma
- Raúl Dantés
- Jorge del Campo
- Josefina Escobedo
- Pepito Fernández
