= Honrarás a los tuyos (1979 TV series) =

Mexican telenovela

- Genre: Telenovela
- Created by: Kenia Perea
- Directed by: Lorenzo de Rodas
- Starring: Irma Lozano; Enrique Novi
- Country of origin: Mexico
- Original language: Spanish
- No. of episodes: 20

Production
- Executive producer: Guillermo Diazayas
- Cinematography: Carlos S. Zúñiga

Original release
- Network: Canal de las Estrellas
- Release: 1979

Related
- Honrarás a los tuyos (1959)

Honrarás a los tuyos is a Mexican telenovela produced by Guillermo Diazayas for Televisa in 1979.

== Cast ==
- Irma Lozano as Toña
- Enrique Novi as Alejandro
- Gloria Marín as Beatriz
- Alicia Montoya as Vicenta
- Viridiana Alatriste as Silvia
- José Ángel Espinosa as Miguel
- Mónica Prado as Martha
- Alicia del Lago as Clara
- Martha Ofelia Galindo as Concha
- Ana Patricia Rojo as Sofía (child)
