= La señora joven =

Mexican telenovela

- Genre: Telenovela
- Created by: María Luz Perea
- Directed by: Julio Castillo
- Starring: Ofelia Medina; José Gálvez
- Country of origin: Mexico
- Original language: Spanish

Production
- Executive producer: Pino Castellanos

Original release
- Network: Televisión Independiente de México
- Release: 1972

La señora joven is a Mexican telenovela produced by Pino Castellanos for Televisión Independiente de México in 1972.

== Cast ==
- Ofelia Medina as Susana Ricarte
- José Gálvez as Leonardo Montiel
- Beatriz Aguirre as Señora Ricarte
- Eduardo Alcaraz as Federico Ricarte
- Julieta Bracho as Rita
- Gregorio Casal as Octavio Servin
- Rosario Granados as Margarita
- Virginia Gutiérrez as Aurorita
- Magda Guzmán as Maura Montiel
- Alma Muriel as Luisa
- María Rivas
- Miguel Suarez
- Maria Clara Zurita as Soledad Ricarte
- Enrique Novi as Andres Montiel
- Luis Torner as Simon Montiel
- Manuel Rivera
- Benny Ybarra
- Francisco Muller
- Julio Lucerna
- Paco Muller
- Cristina Moreno as Flora
