= Las gemelas (1972 TV series) =

- Genre: Telenovela
- Created by: Original Story: Marissa Garrido; Adaptation: Arturo Schoening
- Directed by: Raúl Araiza Sr
- Starring: Maricruz Olivier; Guillermo Murray
- Country of origin: Mexico
- Original language: Spanish

Production
- Executive producer: Ernesto Alonso
- Cinematography: Alfredo Saldaña

Original release
- Network: Televisa
- Release: 1972

Related
- Las gemelas (1961); A ponte do amor (1983)

Las gemelas is a Mexican telenovela produced by Ernesto Alonso for Televisa in 1972.

== Cast ==
- Maricruz Olivier as Paula / Amelia
- Guillermo Murray as Carlos
- Norma Herrera
- Nelly Meden
- Sergio Jiménez
- Miguel Manzano
- Jorge Vargas
- Rafael Banquells
- Raquel Olmedo
- Susana Dosamantes
- Martha Zavaleta
- Otto Sirgo
- Héctor Suárez
- Héctor Flores
- Enrique Álvarez Félix
