= Las víctimas =

Mexican telenovela

- Genre: Telenovela
- Country of origin: Mexico
- Original language: Spanish

Original release
- Network: Telesistema Mexicano
- Release: 1967

Las víctimas is a Mexican telenovela produced by Televisa for Telesistema Mexicano in 1967.

== Cast ==
- Sergio Bustamante
- Alejandro Ciangherotti
- Lorenzo de Rodas
- José Carlos Ruiz
- Olga Morris
