= Pequeñeces =

Mexican telenovela

- Genre: Telenovela; Romance; Drama
- Created by: Luis Coloma
- Starring: Sonia Furió; Joaquín Cordero; Adriana Roel; Norma Lazareno
- Country of origin: Mexico
- Original language: Spanish

Production
- Cinematography: Manolo García

Original release
- Network: Telesistema Mexicano
- Release: 1971 – 1971

Related
- Muchacha italiana viene a casarse; El profesor particular

Pequeñeces (English title:Littleness) is a Mexican telenovela by Televisa for Telesistema Mexicano.

Sonia Furió starred as antagonistic protagonist with Joaquín Cordero and Adriana Roel starred as protagonists.

== Cast ==
- Sonia Furió as Currita Albornoz de Luján
- Joaquín Cordero as Jacopo Tellez
- Adriana Roel as Elvira Covarrubias de Tellez
- Norma Lazareno as Carmen Tagle
- Antonio Raxel as Federico Lujan
- Carlos Monden as Fernando
