= Barata de primavera =

Mexican telenovela

- Genre: Telenovela
- Created by: Marissa Garrido
- Directed by: Rafael Banquells
- Starring: Jacqueline Andere; Enrique Lizalde
- Opening theme: "L'incontro" by Gianni Marchetti
- Country of origin: Mexico
- Original language: Spanish

Production
- Executive producer: Valentín Pimstein
- Production company: Televisa

Original release
- Network: Canal de las Estrellas
- Release: July 3, 1975 – September 3, 1976

Barata de primavera is a Mexican telenovela produced by Valentín Pimstein for Televisa in 1975.

== Cast ==
- Jacqueline Andere as Leticia Reyes
- Enrique Lizalde as Eduardo Lozano
- Verónica Castro as Karina Labrada
- Saby Kamalich as Adriana
- María Teresa Rivas as Laura Palmer
- Lupita Lara as Gabriela Cortes
- Carmen Salas as Angelica
- Mario Sauret as José
- Hector Gómez as Nacho
- Guillermo Murray as Gustavo Silva
- Carlos Piñar as Hector Lomeli
- Maricruz Olivier as Marcela Grey
- Joaquín Cordero as Alberto Neri
- Connie de la Mora as Diana
- Juan Antonio Edwards as Carlos
- Cristina Moreno as Vanessa
- Miguel Córcega as Luis Guzman
- Alicia Montoya as Nana Licha
- Tony Carbajal as Arturo de Lama
- Rocío Banquells as Pilar Estrada ý
- Aurora Cortes as Ramona la camerera de Laura
- Silvia Caos as Martha
- Jorge Ortiz de Pinedo as Rogelio Sulvarsn
- Julio Monterde as Gonzalo Alcocer
- Lorenzo De Rodas as Javier Lozano
- Aurora Molina as Graciela de Cortes
- Aldo Monti as Fernando Meraz
- Miguel Macia as German de la Lama
- Otto Sirgo as Antonio Prado
- Javier Marc as Enrique
- Alma Delfina as Marisa Muñoz
