= Velo de novia (1971 TV series) =

Television series

- Genre: Telenovela; Romance; Drama
- Created by: Original story Janete Clair; Adaptation; Caridad Bravo Adams
- Directed by: Ernesto Alonso; Raúl Araiza
- Starring: Julissa; María Teresa Rivas; Julieta Bracho; Anita Blanch; July Furlong
- Country of origin: Mexico
- Original language: Spanish

Production
- Executive producer: Ernesto Alonso

Original release
- Network: Telesistema Mexicano
- Release: 1971 – 1971

Related
- Velo de novia (2003)

Velo de novia (English title:Veil of bride) is a Mexican telenovela by Televisa produced by Ernesto Alonso and directed by Ernesto Alonso and Raúl Araiza for Telesistema Mexicano. Is original story of Janete Clair and adaptation by Caridad Bravo Adams.

== Cast ==
- Julissa
- María Teresa Rivas
- Julieta Bracho
- Anita Blanch
- July Furlong
- Blanca Sánchez
- Dagoberto Rodríguez
- Miguel Manzano
- Héctor Bonilla
- Sergio Jiménez
- Rafael Banquells
- Alicia Montoya
- Luis Aragón
- Beatriz Sheridan
- Carlos Monden
- Fanny Schiller
