= El precio de un hombre (TV series) =

Television series

- Genre: Telenovela
- Country of origin: Mexico
- Original language: Spanish

Original release
- Network: Telesistema Mexicano
- Release: 1970

El precio de un hombre (English title:The Bounty Killer) is a Mexican telenovela produced by Televisa and transmitted by Telesistema Mexicano in 1970.

== Cast ==
- Guillermo Aguilar
- Augusto Benedico
- Carlos Bracho
- Mario Cid
- Carmen Cortés
