= La recogida =

Mexican telenovela

- Genre: Telenovela; Romance; Drama
- Created by: Julio Porter
- Directed by: Fernando Wagner
- Starring: María Fernanda Ayensa; Sylvia Pasquel; Antonio Medellín; Bertha Moss; Jorge Castillo; Silvia Derbez
- Country of origin: Mexico
- Original language: Spanish
- No. of episodes: 33

Production
- Executive producers: Valentín Pimstein; Luis de Llano Palmer
- Cinematography: Hugo Cervantes
- Running time: 30 minutes

Original release
- Network: Telesistema Mexicano
- Release: 1971 – 1971

Related
- El profesor particular; Rosas para Verónica; La recogida (1974 film) María Belén (2001)

La recogida (English title:The collection) is a Mexican telenovela by Televisa produced by Valentín Pimstein and Luis de Llano Palmer and directed by Fernando Wagner for Telesistema Mexicano. Its original story and adaptation were written by Julio Porter.

María Fernanda Ayensa starred as young protagonist, Silvia Pasquel and Antonio Medellín starred as adult protagonists. Bertha Moss and Jorge Castillo starred as main antagonists. With the special appearance of Silvia Derbez.

The series aired in 1971.

== Cast ==
- María Fernanda Ayensa as Alejandra
- Sylvia Pasquel as Alicia
- Antonio Medellín as Luis Tejeda
- Bertha Moss as Matilde
- Jorge Castillo
- Ada Carrasco
- Enrique Becker
- Pituka de Foronda
- Pili Gonzalez
- Aurora Alcarano
- Mario Gozalez
- Socorro Avelar
- Norma Rodriguez
- Silvia Derbez as Nora Medrano

== Other version ==
- In 1974 a film version with the same name La recogida.
- In 2001 Televisa takes a remake titled María Belén.
