= La duquesa =

Mexican telenovela

- Genre: Telenovela
- Created by: Estella Calderón
- Directed by: Francisco Jambrina
- Starring: Sara García; Miguel Córcega
- Country of origin: Mexico
- Original language: Spanish

Production
- Executive producer: Valentín Pimstein

Original release
- Network: Telesistema Mexicano
- Release: 1966

Related
- Mamá campanita (1978)

La duquesa is a Mexican telenovela produced by Valentín Pimstein for Telesistema Mexicano in 1966.

== Cast ==
- Sara García as La Duquesa
- Miguel Córcega
- Blanca Sánchez
- Enrique Aguilar
- Estela Chacón
- Angelines Fernández
- Polo Ortín
- Belem Díaz
- Pura Vargas
- Mauricio Davison
- Pedro Vargas
