= La cruz de Marisa Cruces =

Mexican telenovela

- Genre: Telenovela
- Country of origin: Mexico
- Original language: Spanish

Original release
- Network: Teleprogramas Acapulco, SA
- Release: 1970

La cruz de Marisa Cruces (English title:The Cross of Marisa Cruces) is a Mexican telenovela produced by Ernesto Alonso and transmitted by Teleprogramas Acapulco, SA in 1970.

== Cast ==
- Amparo Rivelles as Marisa Cruces
- Carlos Bracho as Alfredo Roldán
- Noé Murayama as Guillermo Chávez
- Jorge Vargas as Cristián
- Otto Sirgo as Héctor
- Claudia Islas as Violeta
- Raquel Olmedo as Carola
- Silvia Pasquel as Marisa Cruces (young)
