= Mamá campanita =

Mexican telenovela

- Genre: Telenovela
- Created by: Estela Calderón
- Directed by: Noé Alcántara
- Starring: Silvia Derbez; Enrique Lizalde
- Country of origin: Mexico
- Original language: Spanish

Production
- Executive producer: Valentín Pimstein
- Cinematography: Lorenzo de Rodas; Rafael Banquells

Original release
- Network: Canal de las Estrellas
- Release: 1978

Related
- La duquesa (1966)

Mamá campanita is a Mexican telenovela produced by Valentín Pimstein for Televisa in 1978.

Is an adaptation of the telenovela La duquesa produced in 1966.

The series stars Silvia Derbez, Laura Zapata, Enrique Lizalde and Raymundo Capetillo as protagonists, while Anita Blanch and Marilú Elizaga starred as main antagonists.

== Cast ==
- Silvia Derbez as Carmen Solís de Rodena "Mamá campanita"
- Laura Zapata as Irene Rodena
- Enrique Lizalde as Gerardo
- Anita Blanch as Doña Ana
- Marilú Elizaga as Doña Irene
- Claudio Obregón as Pablo
- Graciela Bernardos as Elisa
- María Idalia as Beatriz
- Silvia Caos as Josefina
- Otto Sirgo as Enrique
- Raymundo Capetillo as Gabriel
- Estela Chacón as Cecilia
- Dina de Marco as Lucero
- José Elías Moreno as Polo
- Maricruz Nájera
- Carmen Cortés
- Raul Boxer
- Julieta Egurrola
- Luis Couturier
