= Valentín Pimstein =

Chilean producer of telenovelas

- Born: Valentín Pimstein Weiner; 9 August 1925; Santiago, Chile
- Died: 27 June 2017 (aged 91); Santiago, Chile
- Other names: Valeria Phillips; Vivian Pestalozzi
- Occupation: Producer
- Years active: 1958–1992
- Spouse: Victoria Ratinoff (m. 1964)
- Children: 3

Valentín Pimstein Weiner (9 August 1925 – 27 June 2017) was a Chilean producer of telenovelas.

== Biography ==
Pimstein was the seventh child of nine in a Belarusian Jewish family (from Minsk), which owns a glass shop in Barrio Brasil in Santiago. His fondness for the romantic and melodramatic stories born under the eaves of his mother, a frequent consumer of Mexican films and soap operas, and developed in parallel with his interest in theater.

After fulfilling adulthood, Pimstein decided to leave his native country in search of adventure. He came to Mexico, where he became assistant director of a film studio assistant by day and a nightclub. There, he met Emilio Azcárraga Milmo, at that time owner of Telesistema Mexicano.

Pimstein died in Chile on June 27, 2017.

== Selected filmography ==
Telenovelas
Year	Title	Notes
1958	La cama de piedra	Executive producer
1958	Las tres pelonas	Executive producer
1958	Gutierritos	Executive producer
1959	Cuando se quiere se quiere	Executive producer
1961	Elena	Executive producer
1962	El profesor Valdez	Executive producer
1962	Pablo y Elena	Executive producer
1963	Madres egoístas	Executive producer
1963	Lo imperdonable	Executive producer
1963	La mesera	Executive producer
1963	La culpa de los padres	Executive producer
1963	El secreto	Executive producer
1964	Napoleoncito	Executive producer
1964	Siempre tuya	Executive producer
1964	Central de emergencia	Executive producer
1965	Corona de lágrimas	Executive producer
1965	La sembradora	Executive producer
1966	Vértigo	Executive producer
1966	María Isabel	Executive producer
1966	Gutierritos	Executive producer
1966	La duquesa	Executive producer
1966	El corrido de Lupe Reyes	Executive producer
1966	Cita en la gloria	Executive producer
1967	Un ángel en el fango	Executive producer
1967	Las víctimas	Executive producer
1966	El ídolo	Executive producer
1967	El usurpador	Executive producer
1967	Obsesión	Executive producer
1967	Incertidumbre	Executive producer
1967	El cuarto mandamiento	Executive producer
1967	Anita de Montemar	Executive producer
1967	Angustia del pasado	Executive producer
1968	Rubí	Executive producer
1968	Mariana	Executive producer
1968	Fallaste corazón	Executive producer
1968	Cruz de amor	Executive producer
1968	Chucho el roto	Executive producer
1968	Aurelia	Executive producer
1968	Una plegaria en el camino	Executive producer
1969	Rosario	Executive producer
1969	La familia	Executive producer
1970	Yesenia	Executive producer
1970	La Gata	Executive producer
1970	Encrucijada	Executive producer
1970	El mariachi	Executive producer
1970	Angelitos negros	Executive producer
1971	La recogida	Executive producer
1971	El amor tiene cara de mujer	Executive producer
1972	Aquí está Felipe Reyes	Executive producer
1973	Mi rival	Executive producer
1973	Los que ayudan a Dios	Executive producer
1973	El honorable Señor Valdez	Executive producer
1973	Amaras a tu prójimo	Executive producer
1974	Siempre habrá un mañana	Executive producer
1974	Mundo de juguete	Executive producer
1974	Ha llegado una intrusa	Executive producer
1975	Pobre Clara	Executive producer
1975	Barata de primavera	Executive producer
1976	Mi hermana la nena	Executive producer
1977	Rina	Executive producer
1977	La venganza	Executive producer
1977	Humillados y ofendidos	Executive producer
1977	Viviana	Executive producer
1978	Muñeca rota	Executive producer
1978	Mamá campanita	Executive producer
1978	Ladronzuela	Executive producer
1978	Gotita de gente	Executive producer
1978	Doménica Montero	Executive producer
1979	Los ricos también lloran	Executive producer
1979	Verónica	Executive producer
1979	Lágrimas negras	Executive producer
1979	J.J. Juez	Executive producer
1979	J.J. Juez	Executive producer
1979	El cielo es para todos	Executive producer
1980	Colorina	Executive producer
1980	Sandra y Paulina	Executive producer
1980	Pelusita	Executive producer
1980	Ambición	Executive producer
1981	Soledad	Executive producer
1981	El hogar que yo robé	Executive producer
1982	Vanessa	Executive producer
1982	Déjame vivir	Executive producer
1983	Nataly	Executive producer
1983	Chispita	Executive producer
1983	Amalia Batista	Executive producer
1984	Principessa	Executive producer
1984	Los años felices	Executive producer
1984	Guadalupe	Executive producer
1985	Vivir un poco	Executive producer
1985	Los años pasan	Executive producer
1985	Bianca Vidal	Executive producer
1986	Monte Calvario	Executive producer
1987	Rosa salvaje	Executive producer
1989	Simplemente María	Executive producer
1989	Carrusel	Executive producer
1991	La pícara soñadora	Executive producer
1992	Carrusel de las Américas	Executive producer
1992	María Mercedes	Executive producer
1994	Marimar	Executive producer
1995	María la del Barrio	Executive producer

=== Film ===
- Napoleoncito (1964)
- Bala perdida (1960)
- Vivir del cuento (1960)
- Las tres pelonas (1958)
- The Living Idol (1957)
