= La llama de tu amor =

Mexican telenovela

- Genre: Telenovela
- Created by: Tessie Picasso
- Directed by: Rafael Baledón
- Starring: Carlos Piñar; Ana Martín
- Country of origin: Mexico
- Original language: Spanish
- No. of seasons: 1
- No. of episodes: 20

Production
- Executive producer: Guillermo Diazayas
- Cinematography: Noé Alcántara
- Running time: 30 minutes

Original release
- Network: Canal de las Estrellas
- Release: 1979

La llama de tu amor is a Mexican telenovela produced by Guillermo Diazayas for Televisa in 1979.

== Cast ==
- Carlos Piñar - Santiago
- Ana Martín - Ana Cecilia
- Norma Lazareno
- July Furlong
- Socorro Avelar
- Rolando de Castro
- Alicia Montoya
- Rosa Furman
- Rafael Banquells
- Luis Rizo
