= La señorita Robles y sus hijos =

Mexican telenovela

- Genre: Telenovela
- Directed by: Noé Alcántara
- Starring: Lucy Tovar; Mauricio Herrera
- Country of origin: Mexico
- Original language: Spanish
- No. of episodes: 30

Production
- Executive producer: Televisa S.A. de C.V

Original release
- Network: Canal de las Estrellas
- Release: 1979

La señorita Robles y sus hijos is a Mexican telenovela directed by Noé Alcántara for Canal de las Estrellas in 1979.

Lucy Tovar and Mauricio Herrera star as the protagonists, while Carlos Monden star as the antagonist.

== Cast ==
- Mauricio Herrera
- Carlos Monden
- Jorge Ortiz de Pinedo
- Begoña Palacios
- Lucy Tovar
