= Mi hermana la nena =

Mexican telenovela

- Genre: Telenovela
- Created by: Estela Calderón
- Starring: Saby Kamalich; Yolanda Merida; Jorge Lavat
- Country of origin: Mexico
- Original language: Spanish

Production
- Executive producer: Valentín Pimstein

Original release
- Network: Televisa
- Release: 1976

Mi hermana la nena is a Mexican telenovela produced by Valentín Pimstein for Televisa in 1976.

== Cast ==
- Saby Kamalich as Silvia Guzmán / Geny Grimaldi
- Jorge Lavat as Jorge
- Raúl Ramírez as Guillermo
- Blanca Sánchez as Regina
- Yolanda Merida as Paulina "La Nena"
- Lorenzo de Rodas as Dr.Castro
- Rocío Banquells as Mónica
- Juan Antonio Edwards as Julio
- Barbara Gil as María
- Roxana Saucedo as Luisita
- Estella Chacón as Estela
- Graciela Orozco as Catalina
- Ricardo Corte as Dick
- Salvador Julian as José Antonio
