= Amaras a tu prójimo =

Mexican telenovela

- Genre: Telenovela
- Directed by: Valentín Pimstein
- Starring: David Reynoso; Luz María Aguilar; Miguel Córcega.
- Country of origin: Mexico
- Original language: Spanish

Original release
- Network: Televisión Independiente de México
- Release: 1973

Amaras a tu prójimo is a Mexican telenovela produced by Luis Vegas and Valentín Pimstein for Televisión Independiente de México in 1973.

== Cast ==
- David Reynoso
- Luz María Aguilar
- Miguel Corcega
- Xavier Marc
- Julio Monterde
- Miguel Suarez
- Nerina Ferrer
- Guillermo Orea
- Silvia Derbez
