= La familia =

- Genre: Telenovela
- Country of origin: Mexico
- Original language: Spanish

Original release
- Network: Telesistema Mexicano

La familia, (English: The Family) is a 1969 Mexican telenovela produced by Televisa and originally transmitted by Telesistema Mexicano.

== Cast ==
- Virginia Gutiérrez
- Jorge Lavat
- Irma Lozano
- Enrique Aguilar
