= Lágrimas negras (TV series) =

Mexican telenovela

- Genre: Telenovela
- Created by: Original Story: Inés Rodena; Adaptation: María Zarattini
- Directed by: José Morris
- Starring: Irma Lozano; Gaston Tuset
- Country of origin: Mexico
- Original language: Spanish

Production
- Executive producer: Valentín Pimstein

Original release
- Network: Canal de las Estrellas
- Release: 1979

Lágrimas negras is a Mexican telenovela produced by Valentín Pimstein for Televisa in 1979.

== Cast ==
- Irma Lozano
- Gaston Tuset as Marques de Alvear
- Nubia Marti as Eugenia
- Salvador Pineda
- Maritza Olivares
- Gloria Marin
- Lucy Gallardo
