= Mi rival =

1973 Mexican telenovela

- Genre: Telenovela
- Created by: Original Story: Inés Rodena; Adaptation: Fernanda Villeli, Marissa Garrido, Carmen Daniels, Mimí Bechelani
- Directed by: Valentín Pimstein
- Starring: Saby Kamalich; Enrique Álvarez Félix
- Opening theme: "Mi rival" by Cuco Sánchez
- Country of origin: Mexico
- Original language: Spanish

Production
- Executive producer: Valentín Pimstein
- Cinematography: Hugo Cervantes

Original release
- Network: Televisa
- Release: 1973

Related
- Amada enemiga; Mi rival (2026 TV series)

Mi rival is a Mexican telenovela produced by Valentín Pimstein for Televisa in 1973. Based on the soap opera of Ines Rodena, Cuando la rival es una hija.

== Cast ==
- Saby Kamalich as María Elena
- Enrique Álvarez Félix as Jorge
- Carlos Bracho as Gonzalo
- Lupe Lara as Elenita
- Sara García as Chayo
- Cuco Sánchez as Cuco
- Aarón Hernán as Anselmo
- Olga Breeskin as Olga
- Lola Beltran as Lola
- Ana Lilia Tovar as Diana
- Eric del Castillo
- Silvia Pasquel as Maritza
- Karina Duprez
- Juan Diego Viña
- Alejandro Ciangherotti
- María Rivas
- Margarita Cortés
- Pedro Damián as Daniel
- Leticia Perdigón
- Arturo Benavides as Genaro
- María Rojo as Rosenda
