= Aventura (TV series) =

- Genre: Telenovela
- Country of origin: Mexico
- Original language: Spanish

Original release
- Network: Telesistema Mexicano
- Release: 1970

Aventura is a Mexican telenovela produced by Televisa and transmitted by Telesistema Mexicano in 1970.

== Cast ==
- Sonia Furió
- Lorenzo de Rodas
- Virginia Gutiérrez
- Enrique Anguilles
