= Mundo de juguete =

Mexican telenovela

- Genre: Telenovela
- Created by: Abel Santa Cruz
- Directed by: Rafael Banquells; Manolo García
- Starring: Graciela Mauri; Ricardo Blume; Irma Lozano; Sara García; Evita Muñoz "Chachita"; Irán Eory; Enrique Rocha; Gloria Marín
- Opening theme: Mundo de juguete by Lupita D'Alessio
- Country of origin: Mexico
- Original language: Spanish
- No. of episodes: 605

Production
- Executive producer: Valentín Pimstein
- Production location: Mexico
- Running time: 41-44 minutes
- Production company: Televisa

Original release
- Network: Canal de las Estrellas
- Release: November 4, 1974 – February 25, 1977

Related
- Gotita de gente; Carita de ángel

Mundo de juguete (English: Toy World) is a Mexican telenovela produced by Televisa. It is a remake of the 1973 Argentine telenovela Papá corazón. It premiered on November 4, 1974, on Canal de las Estrellas and ended on February 25, 1977.

This telenovela holds the record for having the second longest run ever for a Latin American telenovela, with a total of 605 half hour episodes (1974–1977). Most telenovelas run for an average of six to eight months; the shortest ones run about four months, and the longest up to a year. Televisa remade the telenovela in 2000, and called it "Carita de ángel".

== Plot ==
Cristina is Mariano's daughter, a widower. She attends a Catholic school and creates a world of her own ("mundo de juguete") in the school garden. At school she meets "Nana Tomasina", an old woman who lives behind the boarding school where Cristina attends. She takes the lonely girl in and advises her. Cristina succeeds in making her father marry Rosario who was a novice at the convent/boarding school so that she can have a new mother.

== Cast ==
- Graciela Mauri as Cristina
- Ricardo Blume as Mariano Salinas
- Irma Lozano as Rosario
- Irán Eory as Mercedes Balboa
- Enrique Rocha as Leopoldo Balboa
- Sara García as Nana Tomasita
- Evita Muñoz "Chachita" as Hermana Carmela
- Gloria Marín as Madre Superiora
- Xavier Marc as Padre Benito
- Maricarmen Martínez as Toña
- Manuel Calvo as Fermín
- Cristina Rubiales as Lina
- Marilyn Pupo
