= San Martín de Porres (TV series) =

- Genre: Telenovela
- Country of origin: Mexico
- Original language: Spanish

Original release
- Network: Telesistema Mexicano
- Release: 1964

San Martín de Porres is a Mexican telenovela produced by Televisa for Telesistema Mexicano in 1964. Based on the life of San Martín de Porres.

== Cast ==
- Magda Guzmán
- René Muñoz
- Josefina Escobedo
- Jorge del Campo
