= J.J. Juez =

Mexican telenovela

- Genre: Telenovela
- Created by: Original Story: Arturo Moya Grau; Adaptation: Caridad Bravo Adams
- Directed by: Lorenzo de Rodas
- Starring: Blanca Sánchez; Sonia Furió; Salvador Pineda
- Country of origin: Mexico
- Original language: Spanish
- No. of episodes: 20

Production
- Executive producer: Valentín Pimstein

Original release
- Network: Canal de las Estrellas
- Release: 1979

J.J. Juez is a Mexican telenovela produced by Irene Sabido for Televisa in 1979. J.J. Juez is a remake of the original Chilean novela (1977).

== Cast ==
- Blanca Sánchez as Julia Jimenez
- Sonia Furió as Natalia
- Salvador Pineda as Martin
- Silvia Pasquel as Paula Garmendia
- Joaquín Cordero as Don Nicolas Garmendia
- Lorenzo de Rodas as Gonzalo
- Nadia Haro Oliva as Paulette
- Guillermo Orea as Maestro Bondad
- Miguel Córcega as Hilario
- Lilia Aragón as Gilda
- Héctor Cruz as Bruno
- Luis Torner as Anselmo
- Luis Bayardo as Pajarito
- José Elías Moreno as Rodrigo
- Renata Flores as Irene
- Héctor Gómez as Marcial
- Virginia Jimeno as Marga
- Tita Grieg as Malvina
- Enrique Gilabert as Juez
- Arturo Lorca as Hamlet
- Alma Delfina
