= Obsesión (TV series) =

- Genre: Telenovela
- Country of origin: Mexico
- Original language: Spanish
- No. of episodes: 55

Original release
- Network: Telesistema Mexicano
- Release: 1967

Obsesión is a Mexican telenovela produced by Televisa for Telesistema Mexicano in 1967.

== Cast ==
- Ofelia Guilmáin
- Virginia Gutiérrez
- Andrea Palma
- María Idalia
