= Pobre Clara =

Mexican telenovela

- Genre: Telenovela
- Created by: Original Story: Estela Calderón; Adaptation: Carmen Daniels
- Directed by: Miguel Angel Herros
- Starring: Celia Castro; Julio Alemán
- Country of origin: Mexico
- Original language: Spanish

Production
- Executive producer: Valentín Pimstein
- Production company: Televisa

Original release
- Network: Canal de las Estrellas
- Release: 1975

Pobre Clara is a Mexican telenovela produced by Valentín Pimstein for Televisa in 1975.

== Cast ==
- Celia Castro as Clara Escobedo
- Julio Alemán as Dr. Cristian de la Huerta
- María Rivas as Doña Mercedes Escobedo
- Carlos Bracho as Francisco Escobedo
- Ana Luisa Peluffo as Lucia
- Andrea Palma as Doña Beatriz
- Alicia Montoya as Tía Emilia
- Gregorio Casal as René
- Alfredo Leal as Arturo
- Carmen Salas as Clarita Lozano
- Isabela Corona as Nieves
- Bárbara Gil as Mary
- Alma Muriel as Susana
- Julio Monterde as Óscar
- Alan Conrad as Gerente
- Miguel Suárez Arias as Alfaro
- Mauricio Ferrari as Roberto
- Hernán Guido as Edy
- Marcela López Rey as Liliana
- Estela Chacón as Ana María Lozano
- Luz Adriana as Juanita
- Rosángela Balbó as Lourdes
