= El honorable Señor Valdez =

Mexican telenovela

- Genre: Telenovela
- Created by: Mimí Bechelani
- Directed by: Manolo García
- Starring: Ignacio López Tarso; María Elena Marqués
- Country of origin: Mexico
- Original language: Spanish

Production
- Executive producer: Valentín Pimstein

Original release
- Network: Televisa
- Release: 1973

El honorable Señor Valdez is a Mexican telenovela produced by Valentín Pimstein for Televisa in 1973. It starred Ignacio López Tarso and María Elena Marqués.

== Plot ==
Humberto Valdez is portrayed as a successful and outwardly respectable family man whose public image contrasts sharply with his private behavior. Married to Sara and father to two children, Rosalba and Jesús, he maintains a reputation as an "honorable" figure while engaging in unethical practices within his professional life. Despite condemning others for moral failings, Humberto conducts an extramarital relationship with a younger woman, Andrea, and becomes involved in illicit business dealings. As his double life begins to unravel, his authority and carefully constructed persona deteriorate, leading to legal consequences and estrangement from both the community and his own family.

== Cast ==
- Ignacio López Tarso as Humberto Valdez
- María Elena Marqués as Sara Valdez
- Nadia Milton as Rosalba Valdez
- Fernando Larrañaga as Jesús Valdez
- Jorge Lavat as Esteban
- Irma Lozano as Martha
- Fernando Borges as Miguel
- Sonia Amelio as Lola
- Raúl "Chato" Padilla as Don Carlos
- Josefina Escobedo as Sra. Solís
- Justo Martínez as Tiburcio
- Anel as Andrea
