= Los ricos también lloran =

Mexican telenovela

- Genre: Telenovela
- Created by: Inés Rodena
- Written by: María Zarattini; Valeria Phillips; Carlos Romero
- Directed by: Rafael Banquells; Fernando Chacón
- Starring: Verónica Castro; Rogelio Guerra
- Opening theme: "Aprendí a llorar" by Verónica Castro
- Country of origin: Mexico
- Original language: Spanish
- No. of episodes: 248

Production
- Executive producer: Valentín Pimstein
- Producer: José Alberto Castro
- Cinematography: Fernando Chacón
- Production company: Televisa

Original release
- Network: Canal 2
- Release: April 11, 1979 – March 21, 1980

Related
- María la del Barrio; Marina

Los ricos también lloran ("The Rich Also Cry") is a popular telenovela produced in Mexico in 1979, starring Verónica Castro, Rogelio Guerra and Rocío Banquells. Castro also sang the theme "Aprendí a Llorar" ("I learned to cry"), a song written by Lolita de la Colina. The telenovela was produced by Valentín Pimstein and Carlos Romero, it was directed by Rafael Banquells. The story was written by Inés Rodena and adapted by Valeria Philips.

Los Ricos También Lloran aired in 1991–1992 in the Soviet Union and post-Soviet states. It was shown on one of the central TV channels and became the second ever non-Soviet TV series aired in the Soviet Union, after a re-edited condensed version of Escrava Isaura. It was watched virtually by the whole population and became for a long time a reference point, with multiple traces in Soviet and post-Soviet popular culture. It was also broadcast in Indonesia (around 1994 on television channel SCTV, dubbed into Indonesian and retitled Setulus Hati), and in Vietnam (around 1991 as Người giàu cũng khóc).

== Plot ==
In the first part, Mariana Villarreal lives on a ranch in the state of Guanajuato with her father Leonardo, a dying landowner who is presumed to be ruined. Don Leonardo has taken refuge in alcohol, since the death of Mariana's mother, and since he suffered an accident that left him paralyzed. Because of this vice, Mariana grew up totally deprived of good manners and education. The young woman has come to behave savage, dirty and untidy, but no matter what anyone thinks of her she is very happy. Her father, regretting not having watched over her all these years, and knowing that he will die very soon, he is sure that his daughter will not lack anything when she receives her inheritance; where he leaves stipulated that all his fortune will remain in Mariana's hands, when he dies.

Unfortunately, the old man dies, leaving Mariana at the mercy of his cruel wife Irma, and her lover, Diego. Irma makes everyone believe that Diego is her cousin when in reality Diego is her husband. Irma married Don Leonardo for mere economic interest, never loved him, and she was the one who fomented his vice for alcohol, so that he would leave the administration of his properties, and thus be unable to manage his fortune. She always made him and Mariana believe that they were bankrupt, when in truth they were enormously rich. With the death of Don Leonardo, and believing herself the owner of everything, Irma expels Mariana from the hacienda, without caring about her fate.

Mariana manages to reach the capital, and forms a friendship with a poor young man named Pascual, better known as "Pato", who kindly offers his humble home to live. Shortly after her arrival, Mariana is helped by a priest, the well-known Father Adrián. He speaks with a great friend of his, the millionaire Don Alberto Salvatierra to take her to live at his home, and to give Mariana a job as a servant.

Don Alberto, knowing of the early arrival of his son, the arrogant, and handsome Luis Alberto, comes up with a brilliant idea. His plan is to let Mariana live with the family to annoy Luis Alberto. Mariana is to not work as an employee in his home, but rather as "part of the Salvatierra family". Don Alberto wants Mariana to feel comfortable in their home by including her to eat with his family during meal times at the table, without any restrictions. Don Alberto believes that he can annoy him with Mariana and that he can make his son, Luis Alberto change his attitude of laziness and irresponsibility, and become the productive, hardworking and successful man he has always wanted to have as a son. This crazy occurrence is taken with great annoyance by his wife, Doña Elena and her niece Esther. Doña Elena lives worried about the welfare of her son, refuses to believe about the deplorable state in which Luis Alberto has fallen, affirming that in fact he is "sick", and that he needs the care of everyone. She has always spoiled him and Luis Alberto is spoiled by his mother and for this reason, this has ended up gratifying Don Alberto, so he is willing to continue with his plan at any cost. Don Alberto and his son, Luis Alberto do not have a close relationship with each other, they argue a lot.

Don Alberto is fond of Mariana, feels great satisfaction in helping her and educating her, since he sees in her a promising future. Don Alberto and Mariana build a good father, daughter relationship and they learn to trust each other. With the arrival of Luis Alberto, there is a deep resentment on the part of the young man towards Mariana; since he thinks that his father's plan is to treat Mariana better than he treats him, and thinks that his father's plan is to annoy him. As a result, Luis Alberto decides to play along; just for fun, and to annoy his father back, while Doña Elena believes that her son will change his attitude if he marries his niece Esther. Esther also wants Luis Alberto to marry her because of his family's money, since it is her dream of achieving the Salvatierra' richness, and she will not allow anyone to prevent her from marrying Luis Alberto to be rich. As time pass, Luis Alberto cannot believe that he has really fallen in love with Mariana. The young woman managed to conquer him with her sweetness and simplicity, and he is willing to unite his life with her for life.

Esther goes to live at the house of the Salvatierra along with her nana Ramona, who loves her unconditionally and hides a great secret. Esther also finds out about the relationship between Luis Alberto and Mariana, and makes a plan to separate them. She lies, saying that she is pregnant and that the baby she is waiting for is Luis Alberto's. Don Alberto and his wife believe in what Esther says, and force Luis Alberto to comply with his "man's word" by marrying her. Esther achieves her goal, and soon becomes the brand new lady of Salvatierra. Mariana, very hurt, decides to leave the house of Don Alberto, and gets a position as secretary in their company.

Mariana goes to live in a decent apartment and meets a beautiful girl named Patricia, who becomes her best friend. All the effort that Don Alberto has done for Mariana in making her to become a well mannered young lady, has paid off for Mariana; Now Mariana is another person. She is cultured, refined, educated, well dressed and well spoken. Mariana is no longer that "savage girl" that once arrived at the luxurious home that belongs to the Salvatierra family. Mariana attempts to forget her love towards Luis Alberto, and she starts to courtship with a young and brilliant architect of the company that is owned by Don Alberto; Leonardo Mendizábal.

Esther manages to get Luis Alberto to marry her and pretends to have an abortion. Esther is Diego's lover. Later it is discovered that Ramona is the real mother of Esther, who loses the reason. Esther, who is now pregnant with Diego's baby, dies of complications while giving birth. Ramona repents, and asks Mariana for forgiveness and becomes unconditional with her needs.

Earlier and during the 1st part is a subplot of deception and murder. Luis de la Parra, old friend of Don Leonardo, visited him then learns of his death and goes in search of Mariana, since he has in his possession the testament of his father. Irma fears losing the inheritance and demands Diego, her lover, to find Mariana in Mexico City. Luis de la Parra hires an investigator to locate Mariana, but soon dies of a heart attack unknowing that Don Alberto knew him and gave him the testament shortly before his death, which is forgotten. Diego manages to infiltrate the house of the Salvatierra family in order to find Mariana. Diego meets Fernando Branduardi a Gangster and night club owner of Club 2000. Fernando finds interest in the inheritance of Diego and Irma. He starts an affair with Irma while Diego tries to convince Mariana to marry him, but Mariana is engaged to Leonardo and Diego fails at this point.

Fernando sends a hit man (Ramiro) to kill Mariana at her apartment, but kills Patricia who mistakes her for Mariana for wearing a wig similar to her hair. As the subplot thickens Ramiro sells Mariana's engagement ring after stealing various things and after Patricia's murder. When Fernando finds out Ramiro sold the ring and the police uncovers it, Fernando orders Ramiro to be murdered. This makes Irma and Diego worried, because of Diego's affair with Esther and his infiltration and connection with Fernando. This makes Irma and Diego guilty. The fake Dr. Francisco Gómez Ocampo who is an associate of Fernando, who was extorting money from Esther, has failed the attempt at the inheritance, and the Police questioning their motives has made them avoid Fernando. Luis Alberto becomes suspicious of their activities in the interim. Fernando instructs Irma to summon Diego to his club after hours, with everything lost, Fernando plots to kill him. Diego kills Fernando with a metal statue over his head. The police finally track down Dr. Ocampo, who knew of the murders Fernando ordered and Irma's and Diego's involvement. After much questioning Irma breaks down and reveals everything. With that being said the Salvatierra's find out of Mariana's inheritance at the end of the 1st part with the testament that Don Alberto had in his possession. So, Mariana marries Luis Alberto and appears like things are both in love and things are working out for both. Mariana will still know in her apparent poverty the happiness that only love can give, but when her true destiny is discovered, she will learn that the rich also cry.

In the Second part, Mariana waits for a son of Luis Alberto; but by a misunderstanding, Luis Alberto believes that Mariana deceived him with Leonardo Mendizábal and that the child she expects is not his. Mariana sick by her pregnancy, travels to Brazil where Jose Luis is on a contract job to convince him but he rejects her. Luis Alberto's parents are on vacation in Europe. After a telegram is sent for Luis Alberto to return to Mexico City and await the birth of his son. Luis Alberto angry, sends her a telegram wanting a divorce and to give the baby's name Leonardo Mendizábal . Mariana loses her mind and she is shocked about the telegram, and wanders out of the house forlorn disappearing from the residence. Ramona after reading the telegram heads out to find Mariana. She passes out in the street and taken to a hospital in her final terms of her pregnancy, refusing to eat, falling in a deep depression and wanting to die. Mariana gives birth to her son and continues to walk the streets and lost in the world. Mariana gives her son unwittingly in her mental state to Cho'le, a lottery ticket seller. Mariana never returns and Cho'le along with her friend Felipa accept to takes care of the baby boy as their own; she only knows that the baby boy's name is Alberto (Beto). Mariana realizes what she has done and is desperate to find her baby boy. She is admitted to a phystratric hospital after saying she has given birth to a baby boy and missing for three days. Mariana reconciles with Luis Alberto and together they begin the search for the lost child, but to no avail, all hope is lost, however, Mariana's mother intuition wants to continue her search. Mariana recovers from her insanity, and Luis Alberto brings a baby home to adopt. Mariana then realizes that the baby is a girl, Luis Alberto convinces Mariana to keep the baby, but Marina vows to find her son. Luis Alberto and Mariana agree to adopt the baby girl whom they name María Isabel.

Seven years pass and Marina is still bothered by Beto missing, she continues to go back to the same place where she gave him away in hopes to find Beto. Luis Alberto tries to convince Mariana to forget but she is headstrong in her search even to risk her marriage and it drives Luis Alberto away. She unexpectedly bumps into Beto and buys him gifts. Sara the maid starts an illicit affair with Luis Alberto. Ramona warns Sara to stay away from Luis Alberto. It is not until Mariana discovers the affair and fires Sara from her job.

Forward to ten years; Maria Isabel has grown up to be a spoiled and rebellious girl. On the other hand, Beto has grown up in Cho'le's care in a poor neighborhood, but a humble lifestyle. Later, they meet and they start a friendship/love relationship, but then they find out they are related and they both end the relationship, which makes it difficult for both of them. Cho'le has been ill with her leg and in turn she has been wanting to tell Beto about his adoption, but she keeps hesitating to tell him the truth. We find Sara married to Juan Manuel who is a degenerate gambler and broke and starts extorting money from Luis Alberto to blackmail him about Maria Isabel's adoption. While vividly Mariana is losing hope of ever finding her son. Fate will take care of reuniting Mariana and her son. She bumps into Beto twice while he is selling lottery tickets. Cho'le gets hit by a bus and requires surgery and plasma. Beto desperate with no money bumps into his friend Sebastian who is a house thief. Sebastian convinces Beto to enter the Salvatierra 's home to robb them so that he can pay for Cho'le's operation. Mariana, when she learns the reasons that forced him to commit the crime, she becomes his protector without Luis Alberto's approval. Mariana goes to see Cho'le at the hospital and learns that Beto is her lost son. When Cho'le confesses how Beto got to her, Mariana suffers a faint. From that point forward, Mariana takes care of Beto, without confessing that Beto is her son to Beto or to Luis Alberto. Mariana then buys him clothes, gives him private teachers and gets him a luxurious apartment, which he and Cho'le live with Felipa. Luis Alberto vowed to Mariana that he would never accept a thief in his family, this pushes Mariana to help Beto become a respectable young man to present him before her husband and to reveal that he is not a disgrace.

Mariana's visits to the apartment bring her problems with Luis Alberto, and María Isabel. Sara, who sees Mariana with Beto, thinks that she has a lover, Sara begins to blackmail Mariana with revealing everything to Luis Alberto. After a final payout, Sara accidentally kills Juan Manuel by pushing him on to a brick chimney and tries to escape from the police; Sara is charged with murder. Then there is Joanna Smith, who later is revealed to be María Isabel's biological mother and cause's issues between Mariana's and María Isabel's relationship.

In the end, the truth will be discovered when Luis Alberto, believes that Beto is Mariana's lover, tries to shoot him, but remembers the words that the private investigator told him and leaves the apartment. Luis Alberto goes on a trip because he has learned that his mother has died abroad. Afterwards, Luis Alberto and his father come back to Mexico and they decide to leave the house. Meanwhile, Cho'le and Felipa make plans in running away with Beto, so that Mariana does not take away her son. The next day Mariana goes to the apartment and cannot find anyone, and she learns that they are going to take a train and she follows them to Monterrey; with much effort, Mariana does convinces them to come back. On the other hand, Mariana also needs to faced this situation with Luis Alberto. Mariana then reveals to Luis Alberto that Beto is their lost son. Beto is accepted by Luis Alberto and then Beto comes to live in the house with the whole family. The Salvatierra have a party, where María Isabel and Beto reveal their love to one another. They tell about their relationship and about their relationship; Mariana and Luis Alberto reconcile; after all the trials and tribulations, the Salvatierra family live happily ever after.

== Full cast ==
- Verónica Castro as Mariana Villareal
- Rogelio Guerra as Luis Alberto Salvatierra Izaguirre
- Rocío Banquells as Esther Izaguirre
- Christian Bach as Joanna Smith
- Rafael Banquells as Adrián
- Augusto Benedico as Don Alberto Salvatierra
- Guillermo Capetillo as Alberto Salvatierra Villareal "Beto"
- Ada Carrasco as Felipa
- Estela Chacón as Virginia enfermera
- Aurora Clavel as Mama Cho'le López
- Edith González as Mara Isabel Castañeda Smith
- Alicia Rodríguez as Doña Elena Izaguirre de Salvatierra
- Yolanda Mérida as Ramona
- Ricardo Cortés as Juan Manuel
- Marina Dorell as Sara González
- Arturo Lorca as Jaime
- Magda Haller as Doña Rosario
- Robertha as Roberta
- Columba Domínguez as María (No. 1)
- Marilú Elízaga as Doña Elena Izaguirre de Salvatierra
- Connie de la Mora as Patricia Medina
- Manuel Guízar as Dr. Francisco Campos
- Flor Procuna as Irma Ramos, viuda de Villareal
- Miguel Palmer as Diego Ávila (No. 1)
- Fernando Luján as Diego Ávila (No. 2)
- Carlos Fernández as Carlos Castañeda
- Edgar Wald
- Carlos Cámara as Fernando Branduardi
- Fernando Mendoza as Don Leonardo Villarreal
- Jose Elias Moreno as Pascual "Pato"
- Maricruz Nájera as María (No. 2)
- Maleni Morales
- Leonardo Daniel as Leonardo Mendizábal
- María Teresa Rivas as Sor Ursula
- Leticia Perdigón as Lilí
- Socorro Bonilla as Virginia
- Victoria Vera as Victoria "La Tormentosa"
- Antonio Bravo as Luis de la Parra
- Raúl Meraz as Comandante Rivas
- Miguel Angel Negrete as Máximo
- Federico Falcón as Doctor López
- Humberto Cabañas as Humberto
- María Rebeca as Marisabel (as a child)
- Armando Alcázar as Beto (as a child)
- Socorro Avelar as Morena
- Gaston Tuset as Doctor Suárez
- Oscar Bonfiglio as Sebastián
- Teo Tapia as Doctor Joaquín Herrera
- Luis Bayardo
- Aurora Medina as Teresa
- Fernando Borges as Eduardo Sagredo
- Lina Michel as Collette
- Carlos Pouillot as Federico Mendizábal
- Javier Marc as Licenciado González
- Patricia Myers
- Roberto Ballesteros as a waiter

== Theme song ==
The theme songs is "Aprendí a Llorar" sung by Verónica Castro.

The majority of the background music that was used was the music of International Velvet soundtrack by Francis Lai. Main Title, Escapade, Velvet's Theme, Sarah's Theme, and End Title were used for the novellas backdrop music.

== Remakes ==
- María la del Barrio (1995–1996)
- Marina (2006)
- Los ricos también lloran (2022)
