= Claudio Obregón =

Mexican actor

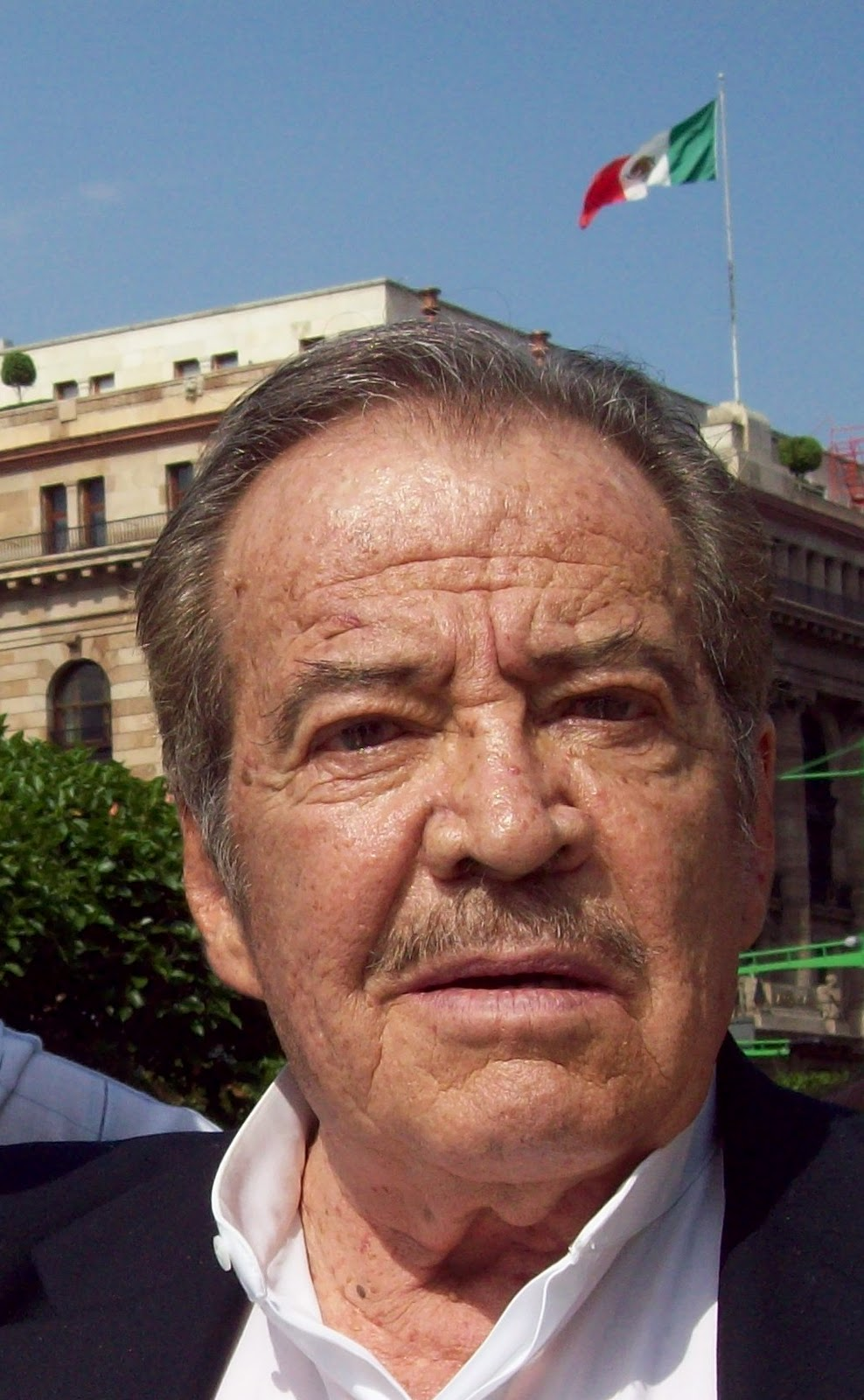
- Born: 11 July 1935; San Luis Potosí, Mexico
- Died: 13 November 2010 (aged 75); Mexico City, Mexico
- Occupation: Actor
- Years active: 1965–2010

Claudio Obregón (11 July 1935 – 13 November 2010) was a Mexican actor. He appeared in over 60 films and television shows between 1965 and 2010.

== Selected filmography ==
- The Garden of Aunt Isabel (1971)
- Reed: Insurgent Mexico (1973)
- El callejón de los milagros (1994)
- Loop (1999)
