= Rafael Banquells =

Cuban actor (1917–1990)

- Born: Rafael Banquells Garafulla; 25 June 1917; Havana, Cuba
- Died: 27 October 1990 (aged 73); Mexico City, Mexico
- Occupations: Actor, director, businessman
- Years active: 1936–1990
- Spouses: Blanca de Castejon (m. 1934; div. 1942) Silvia Pinal (m. 1947; div. 1952) Dina de Marco (m. 1955)
- Children: 5, including Silvia Pasquel and Rocío Banquells
- Family: Stephanie Salas (granddaughter)

Rafael Banquells Garafulla (born Rafael Banquells Garafulla; 25 June 1917 – 27 October 1990) was a Cuban-born Mexican actor, director and TV producer known in Mexico as Rafael Banquells (I).

== Biography ==
Banquells was born on 25 June 1917 in La Habana, Cuba, to Spanish parents. The family moved back to Spain and he went to primary school in Barcelona. Following the Spanish Civil War, they moved to France and then Mexico. Banquells began his career as a movies actor in 1940. He was married three times. His wives were actresses. First he married Blanca de Castejón (deceased). He was then married to the actress and TV producer Silvia Pinal and they had a daughter, Sylvia Pasquel; and he was last married to the actress Dina de Marco. Their children are José Manuel, Rocío Banquells, Mary Paz, Ariadne and Rafael Jr.

Rafael died on 27 October 1990 in Mexico City, at the age of 73.

== Filmography ==
=== As an actor ===
Films
Year	Title	Role	Notes
1919	La Dama duende		Film debut
1936	Nuestra Natacha	Juan	
1942	Secreto eterno	Pablo, adulto	Uncredited
1943	Maravilla del toreo	Chiclanero	
1943	Qué hombre tan simpático	Paco	
1943	Resurrección		
1943	No matarás	Ricardo Saavedra	
1943	Internado para señoritas		
1944	Las dos huérfanas		
1944	El médico de las locas	Renato	
1944	Cuando escuches este vals		
1944	Los hijos de Don Venancio	Eduardo	
1945	La mujer legítima	Luis	
1946	Los nietos de Don Venancio	Eduardo	
1946	María Magdalena, pecadora de Magdala	San Juan	
1946	Su última aventura	Adolfo	
1947	Bel Ami	Jacobo Rival	
1947	The Private Life of Mark Antony and Cleopatra	Marco Antonio	
1947	Ecija's Seven Children		
1947	El amor abrió los ojos		
1947	Arsène Lupin	Montpigny	
1947	The Secret of Juan Palomo		
1948	Reina de reinas: La Virgen María	San Juan Apóstol	
1948	Enrédate y verás	Luis	
1948	The Last Night		
1949	Una mujer con pasado	Jorge	
1949	El pecado de Laura	Pedro	
1950	The Mark of the Skunk	Oficial	
1951	Vivillo desde chiquillo	Leonardo del Paso	
1951	Recién casados, no molestar	Amigo de Andrés	Uncredited
1952	Passionflower	Juan	
1952	When Children Sin		
1953	Amor de locura	Representante	
1953	Había una vez un marido	Anunciador	Uncredited
1953	Él	Ricardo Luján	
1953	Sí, mi vida	Valentín Chagoya	
1953	Reportaje	Banquells, reporter	
1954	La visita que no tocó el timbre	Menéndez	
1955	The Murderer X	Sargento Ralph Curtis	Uncredited
1956	La sombra vengadora	Camarero	
1956	El Rey de México	Actor en película	
1956	The Medallion Crime	Valle	
1956	La sombra vengadora vs. La mano negra		
1956	Amor y pecado		
1956	Esposas infieles		
1957	Teatro del crimen	Inspector de policía	
1957	El tesoro de Pancho Villa		
1957	Legítima defensa	Abogado defensor	
1957	Los tres mosqueteros y medio	Duque de Buckingham	
1957	El secreto de Pancho Villa		
1959	Gutierritos	Ángel Gutiérrez	
1964	La alegría de vivir		
1970	Santo contra Blue Demon en la Atlantida	Professor Gerard / X22	
1971	El sinvergüenza		
1971	Pubertinaje		Segment: "Una cena de navidad"
1973	Vidita negra		
1974	El santo oficio	Principal de la Real Audiencia	
1974	En busca de un muro	Médico	
1979	Los indolentes	Borracho	
1979	Estas ruinas que ves	Rector Sebastián Montaña	
1980	La sucesión		
1988	Ni de aquí, ni de allá	Jefe de policía	
1989	Cabalgando con la muerte	Sebastián Durán	
1991	El jinete de la divina providencia		

Television
Year	Title	Role	Notes
1958	Gutierritos	Angel Gutiérrez	Television debut
1959	Mi esposa se divorcia		
1960	Secretaria o mujer		
1960	La casa del odio		
1960	El hombre de oro		
1961	El enemigo		
1962	Codicia		
1963	Destino		
1963	Cita con la muerte		
1964	El dolor de vivir		
1966	Gutierritos	Ángel Gutiérrez "Gutierritos"	Lead role
1967	Adriana		
1971	Velo de novia		
1971	Muchacha italiana viene a casarse	Joseph	
1972	Las gemelas	Don Raúl Beltrán	Episode: "Comienzo"
1974	Ha llegado una intrusa	Rafael Moreno	
1977	Rina		
1977	Humillados y ofendidos	Don Nicolás	
1978	Viviana	Dr. Navas	
1979	Los ricos también lloran	Adrián	Episode: "La tormenta"
1979	La llama de tu amor		
1980	Soledad	Juez	
1981	Una limosna de amor	Elías	
1981	Infamia	Dr. Navarro	
1989	El cristal empañado		
