= Humiliated and Insulted =

1861 novel by Fyodor Dostoevsky

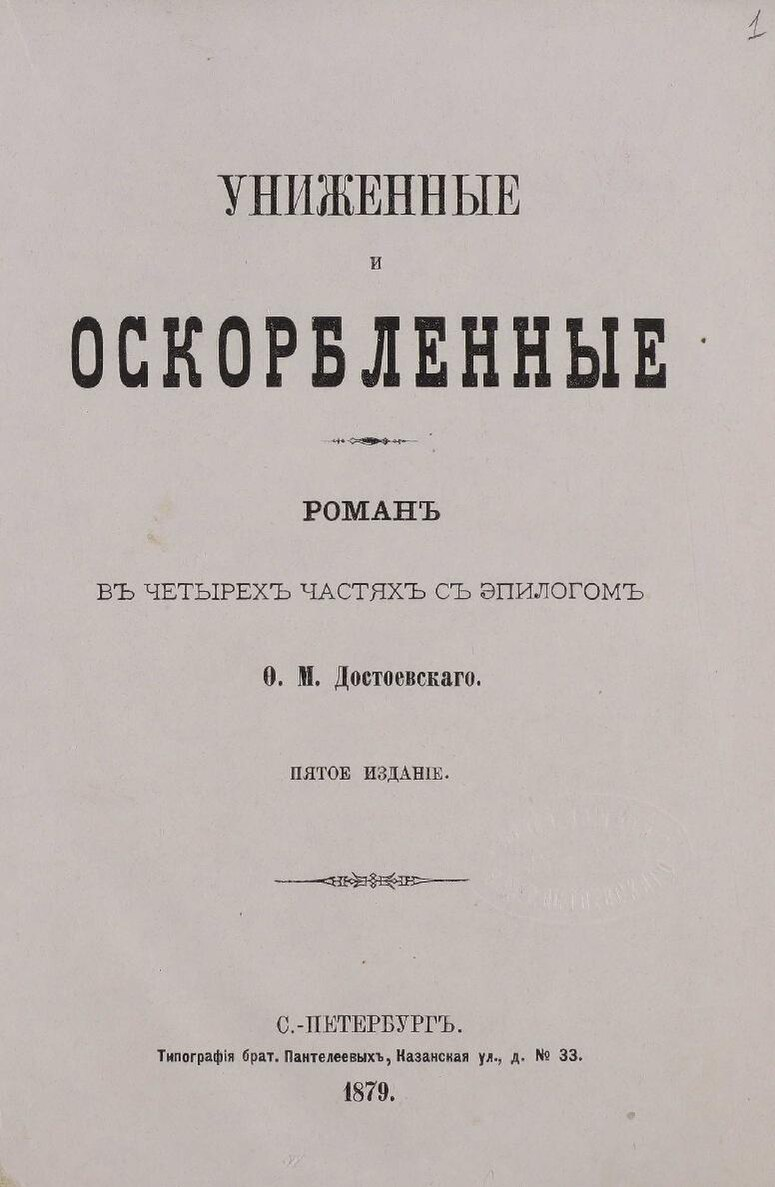
- 1879 title page
- Author: Fyodor Dostoevsky
- Original title: Униженные и оскорблённые (Unizhennye i oskorblyonnye)
- Translator: Constance Garnett
- Language: Russian
- Genre: Novel
- Publication date: 1861
- Publication place: Russia
- Media type: Print (hardback and paperback)
- Pages: 450 pp (paperback edition)
- ISBN: 978-1-84749-045-2 (Oneworld Classics paperback)ISBN 0-89875-104-7 (paperback edition)
- OCLC: 181069446
- LC Class: PG3326 .U5 2008

Humiliated and Insulted (Russian: Униженные и оскорблённые, Unizhennye i oskorblyonnye) — also known in English as The Insulted and Humiliated, The Insulted and the Injured or Injury and Insult — is a novel by Fyodor Dostoevsky, first published in 1861 in the monthly magazine Vremya.

== Plot introduction ==
Narrated by a young novelist, Vanya (Ivan Petrovich), who has just released his first novel (which bears an obvious resemblance to Dostoevsky's own first novel, Poor Folk), it consists of two gradually converging plot lines. One deals with Vanya's close friend and former love object, Natasha, who has left her family to live with her new lover, Alyosha. Alyosha is the saintly but dim-witted son of Prince Valkovsky, who hopes to gain financially by marrying Alyosha off to an heiress, Katya. Valkovsky's cruel machinations to break up Alyosha and Natasha identify him as one of the most memorable "predatory types" that Dostoevsky created. The other plotline focuses on a thirteen-year-old orphan, Nellie, whom Vanya saves from an abusive household by taking her into his apartment, and whose deceased mother's story in some ways parallels that of Natasha. It's unusual to see a well-developed character as young as Nellie in a Dostoevsky novel, but Nellie may be one of his most moving creations, and she in particular shows the influence of Dickens (Dostoevsky is known to have read Dickens during the Siberian exile; this novel was conceived near the end of this exile).

== Synopsis ==
Natasha leaves her parents' home and runs away with Alyosha (Prince Alexey), the son of Prince Valkovsky. As a result of his pain, her father, Nikolai, curses her. The only friend that remains by Natasha's side is Ivan – her childhood friend who is deeply in love with her, and whom Natasha has rejected despite their being engaged. Prince Valkovsky tries to destroy Alyosha's plans to marry Natasha, and wants to make him marry the rich princess Katerina. Alyosha is a naïve but lovable young man who is easily manipulated by his father. Following his father's plan, Alyosha falls in love with Katerina, but still loves Natasha. He is constantly torn between these two women, too indecisive and infatuated with both to make a decision. Eventually, Natasha sacrifices her own feelings and withdraws in order for Alyosha to choose Katerina. Meanwhile, Ivan rescues an orphan girl, Elena (known as Nellie), from the clutches of a procuress and learns that her mother ran away from her father's (Jeremy Smith's) home with her sweetheart, a man who abandoned her when Nellie's mother gave birth. It is later revealed that Prince Valkovsky is Nellie's father. Her parents were legally married, but Prince Valkovsky persuaded his young and innocent wife to rob her father, Jeremy. After moving to Petersburg, Nellie's mother asks her father for forgiveness, but he rejects them. Before dying, Nellie's mother makes Nellie promise to never go to her real father, whose name is on a document she leaves her daughter. In an attempt to make Nikolai (Natasha's father) reconcile with Natasha, Ivan persuades Nikolai and his wife to adopt Nellie. By telling them her life story, Nellie makes Nikolai's heart soften and he forgives Natasha and removes his curse, and they are reunited. Natasha's family plans to move from Petersburg, but just before they leave Nellie dies from a chronic heart condition; the little girl makes it clear to Ivan she does not forgive her father for his cruel treatment of her mother. She also tells him he should marry Natasha. The story ends on an ambiguous note with Natasha and Ivan reflecting on the events that have unfolded.

== Characters ==
- Ivan Petrovich – protagonist
- Nikolai Sergueych Ikhmenev – landlord of Ikhmenevka
- Anna Andreyevna – Nikolai's wife
- Natasha (Natalya Nikolayevna) – Nikolai's daughter
- Mavra – Natasha's maid
- Prince Valkovsky
- Prince Alexey – Prince Valkovsky's son
- Jeremy Smith
- Elena (Nellie) – Mr Smith's grand daughter
- Filipp Filippych Masloboyev – Ivan Petrovich's old acquaintance
- Alexandra Semionovna – Filipp's wife
- Katerina Fiodorovna – Prince Alexeï's future wife

== List of English translations ==
- Frederick Whishaw (1886, as Injury and Insult)
- Constance Garnett (1914, as The Insulted and Injured)
- Olga Shartse (1946, as The Insulted and Humiliated)
- Ignat Avsey (2008, as Humiliated and Insulted)
- Boris Jakim (2011, as The Insulted and Injured)
- David Petault (2024, as Humiliated and Insulted)

== Film adaptations ==
In 1922, a German silent film directed by Frederic Zelnik was based on the novel.

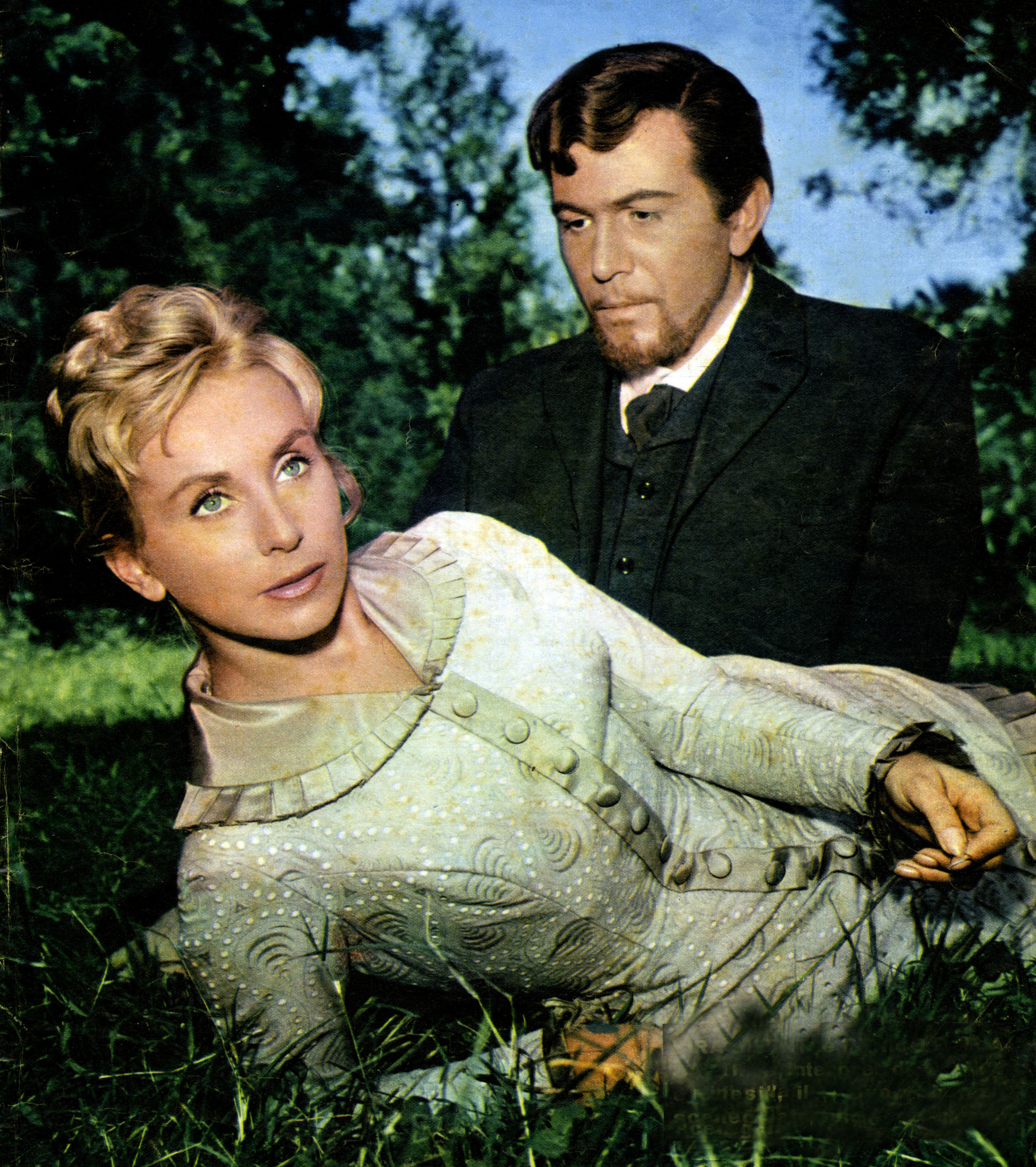
Vira Silenti and Enrico Maria Salerno in a 1958 version for Italian TV

Humiliated and Insulted was adapted in 1991 for cinema by Soviet director Andrei Andreyevich Eshpai with Nastassja Kinski as Natasha.

The Hong Kong film The Insulted and the Injured (豪門孽債), released in 1950, was based on the story, but set in post-World War II Shanghai. It was directed by Lau King, who also plays the character of the young writer Cen Mu in the film.

The Japanese film Red Beard (1965) is primarily based on Shūgorō Yamamoto's 1959 short story collection, Akahige Shinryōtan, but it also borrows a subplot from Humiliated and Insulted.
