= Alicia Rodríguez (Spanish actress) =

Spanish-Mexican actress

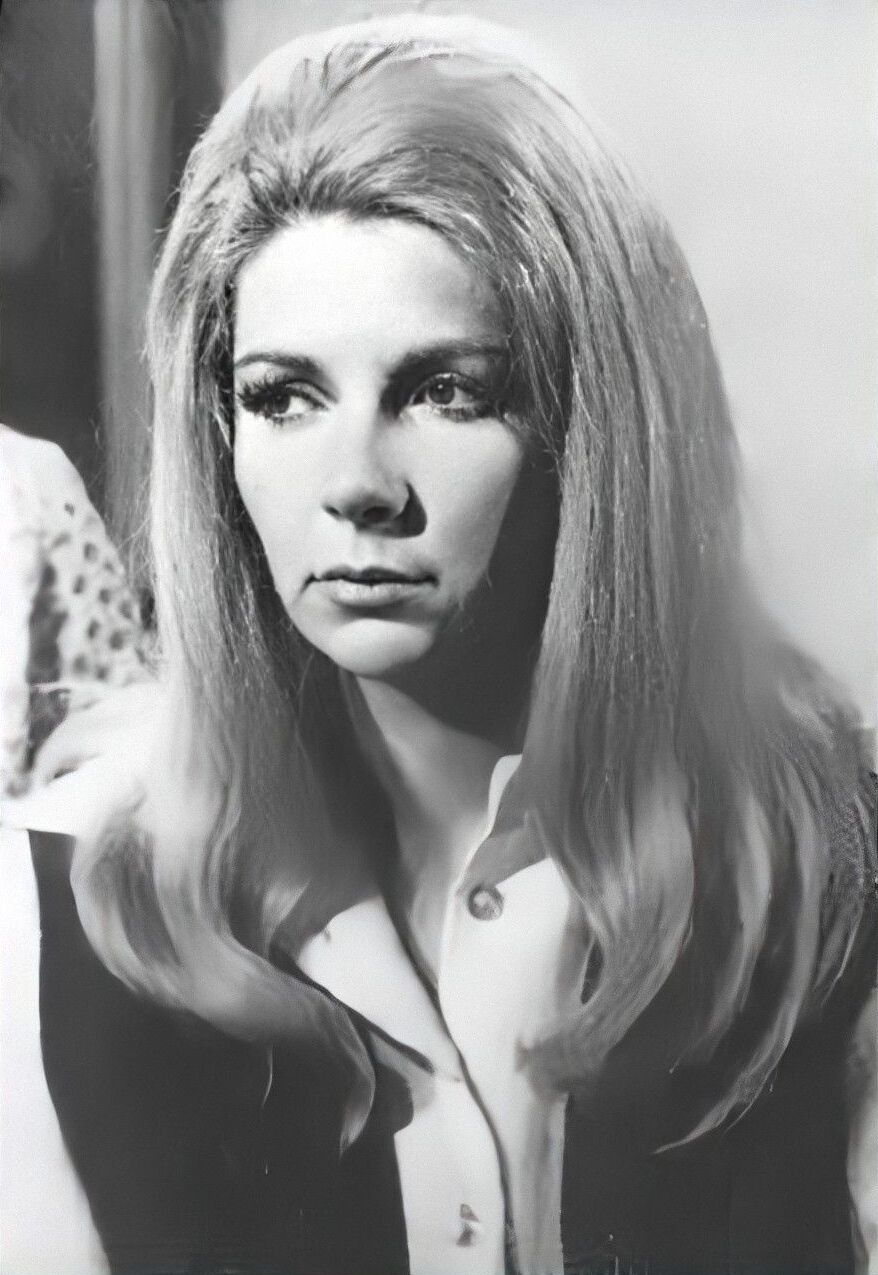
- Rodríguez in 1967
- Born: Alicia Rodríguez Fernández; 2 May 1935 (age 91); Málaga, Spain
- Occupation: Actress
- Years active: 1940–2012

Alicia Rodríguez Fernández (born 2 May 1935) is a Spanish-Mexican actress. She appeared in a number of theaters, films, and television series.

== Life and career ==
Rodríguez was born in Málaga on 2 May 1935 as Alicia Rodríguez Fernández. While she was still a baby, her family immigrated to Mexico due to the Spanish Civil War.

Rodríguez began her acting career in theatre as a child actress. In 1946, she received an Ariel Award for her performance in the film El secreto de la solterona. Then, she was very well-known and loved among her fans.

== Selected filmography ==
Telenovelas
Year	Title	Role	Notes
2011-2012	Una familia con suerte	Fernanda Peña	
2007-2008	Al diablo con los guapos	Regina Lascuráin Vda. de Belmonte	
2000	Abrázame muy fuerte	Consuelo Rivas de Álvarez	
1979	Los ricos también lloran	Doña Elena Izaguirre de Salvatierra	
