= Inés Rodena =

Cuban radio and television writer

Inés Rodena (April 20, 1905 in Havana, Cuba – April 15, 1985 in Miami, USA) was a Cuban radio and television writer.

== Life and career ==
Before becoming a writer Rodena worked as a nurse. Through her experiences with her patients and stories recounted by people with whom she came in contact, her passion for writing was born.

In the 50s she wrote her first novel, La Gata (The Cat) for radio, which was a great success. In 1968 she brought La Gata to television with great success under the production of the Venezuelan state television channel.

In 1969 she went to work at Radio Caracas Television. In 1971, she recorded La usurpadora (The Usurper). Agnes' novels all met with great success, being recorded in Mexico, Venezuela and other Latin American countries. Rachel, Rina, Viviana, Los ricos también lloran (The Rich Also Cry), and Rosa salvaje (Wild Rose) are some of her greatest hits.

She died on April 15, 1985, aged 79.

== Filmography ==
- Abandonada
- Ambición
- Charito Carvajal
- Corina Bazán
- Cuando la rival es una hija
- Cuando se regala un hijo
- Domenica Montero
- Enamorada
- Entre sombras
- Ileana
- La bastarda
- La doctorcita
- La galleguita
- La gata
- La gaviota
- La madrastra
- La mesera
- La señorita Amalia
- La usurpadora
- La virgen de Barlovento
- La virgen de Cerro
- Lágrimas negras
- Los ricos también lloran
- Mademoseville Fabian
- María Mercé la mulata
- María Salomé
- Milagro de amor
- Muchachas de hoy
- Nosotros los pobres
- Pobre Millonaria
- Regina Carbonell
- Sacrificio de mujer
- Valentina
