= El Enemigo =

El Enemigo, Spanish for "The Enemy", may refer to:

- El Enemigo (1961 TV series), a Mexican telenovela
- El Enemigo (1979 TV series), a remake of the 1961 telenovela
- El enemigo, a 2008 Venezuelan film directed by Luis Alberto Lamata

== See also ==
- Enemy (disambiguation)
- Los Enemigos (disambiguation)
