= Dubai Ports World controversy =

National security controversy in the United States

The Dubai Ports World controversy began in February 2006 and rose to prominence as a national security debate in the United States. At issue was the sale of port management businesses in six major U.S. seaports to a company based in the United Arab Emirates (UAE), and whether such a sale would compromise port security.

The controversy pertained to management contracts of six major United States ports. The purchaser was DP World (DPW), a state-owned company in the UAE. The contracts had already been foreign-owned, by P&O, a British firm taken over by DPW (completed in March 2006). Although the sale was approved by the executive branch of the United States Government, various United States political figures argued that the takeover would compromise U.S. port security.

U.S. President George W. Bush argued vigorously for the approval of the deal, claiming that the delay sends the wrong message to U.S. allies. Legislation was introduced to the United States Congress to delay the sale. On March 8, 2006, the United States House Committee on Appropriations voted 62–2 to block the deal. Despite President Bush's previous intention to veto the legislation, DP World announced on March 9, 2006 that they will drop the deal and transfer operations to a U.S. entity to defuse the situation. Dubai Ports World eventually sold P&O's American operations to American International Group's asset management division, Global Investment Group, for an undisclosed sum. The company is now known as Ports America.

== Background ==
DP World is a company owned by the government of Dubai in the United Arab Emirates, via a holding company. This holding company is under the direct control of the Ruler of Dubai, Sheikh Mohammed bin Rashid Al Maktoum, who is also Vice President and Prime Minister of the UAE.

== Chronology ==
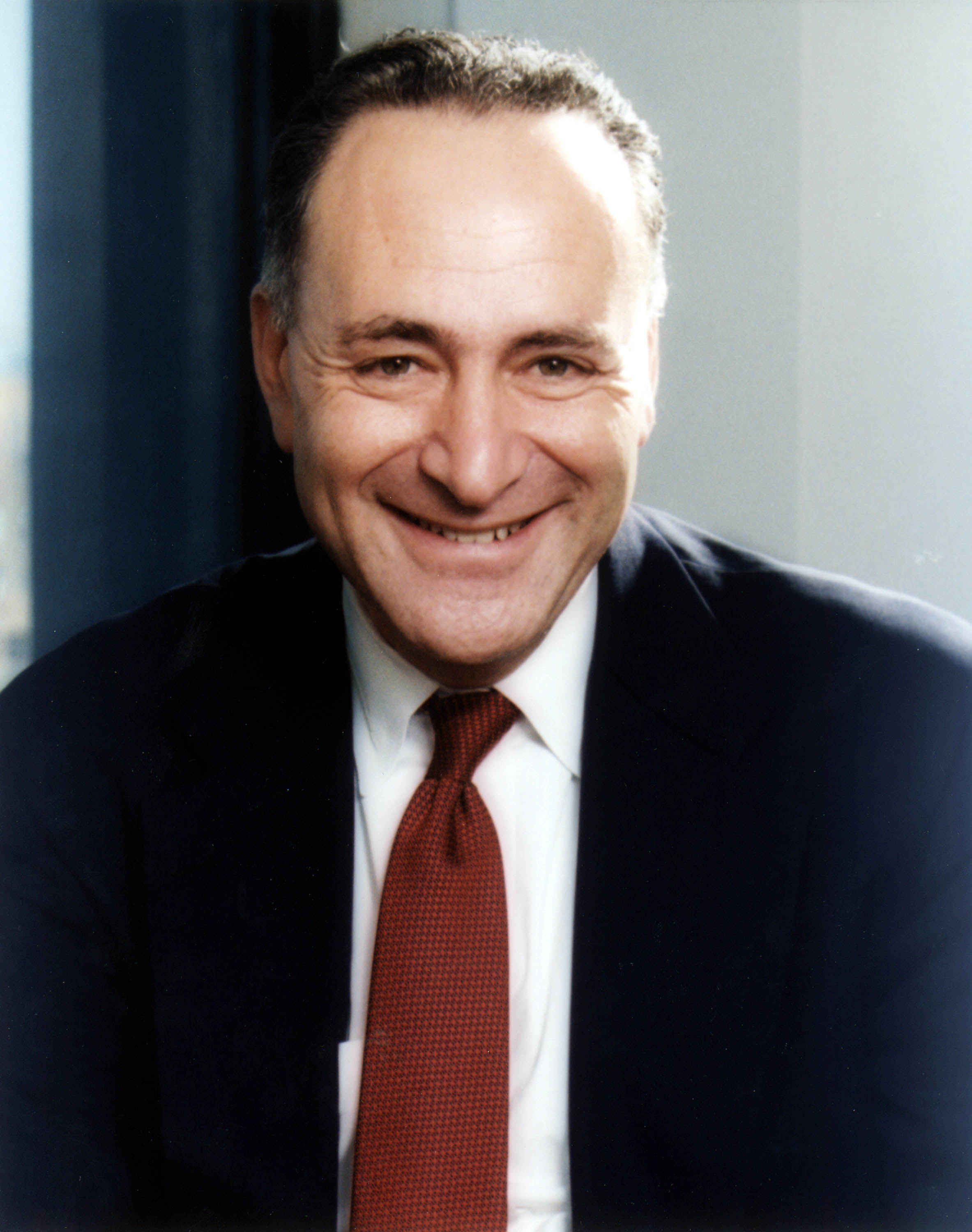
U.S. Senator from New York, Chuck Schumer, brought the case to national attention.

In mid-October 2005, DP World approached the Committee on Foreign Investment in the United States (CFIUS) to clear regulatory hurdles for a possible acquisition of the British firm P&O. The CFIUS is the multi-agency federal panel that passes judgment on deals with foreign corporations that raise antitrust or national security questions. Soon after, DPW began negotiating the terms of the takeover with P&O. They were advised by former President Bill Clinton to submit to a 45-day review of the acquisition.

In December 2005, Coast Guard intelligence officials raised the possibility of significant security risks associated with the management of some U.S. port operations by a Dubai company, stating in a report that broad intelligence gaps prevented them from assessing the risks.

In February 2006, the stockholders of the Peninsular and Oriental Steam Navigation Company (P&O), a British firm, agreed to a sale of that company to DPW over a bid by PSA International of Singapore. As part of the sale, DPW would assume the leases of P&O to manage major U.S. facilities at the Port of New York and New Jersey, Port of Philadelphia, Port of Baltimore, Port of New Orleans, and the Port of Miami, as well as operations in 16 other ports.

After P&O stockholders approved the deal, the arrangement was reviewed by the CFIUS headed by the U.S. Treasury Department. The transfer of leases was approved.

When the deal appeared in the business press, it was noticed by Eller & Company, a Florida firm. Eller has two joint ventures with P&O and it feared becoming an "involuntary partner of DP World," said Michael Kreitzer, Eller's lawyer. According to Kreitzer, Eller hired semi-retired lobbyist Joe Muldoon as a last-ditch effort to persuade Congress to block the deal. Soon, Muldoon and Kreitzer got the attention of Democratic New York Senator Charles E. Schumer and an Associated Press reporter. Within days, Schumer held a press conference calling for a review and the AP ran the story nationally.

Congressional politicians were quick to respond after Schumer's press conference and the AP story put the Dubai Ports deal in the national spotlight. Both Democratic and Republican members of Congress started to question the approval. Republican leaders Dennis Hastert and Bill Frist, who usually work closely with the office of the President, publicly questioned the deal. Frist said "If the administration cannot delay the process, I plan on introducing legislation to ensure that the deal is placed on hold until this decision gets a more thorough review."

On February 22, 2006, President Bush threatened to veto any legislation passed by Congress to block the deal, a veto that would be his first. In a statement to reporters, Bush claimed, "It would send a terrible signal to friends and allies not to let this transaction go through." DP Worlds Chief Operating Officer, Ted Bilkey engaged a number of high-profile lobbying firms to garner congressional support for the deal.

The controversy created a public and unusually high-profile dispute within the Republican Party, and between the Republican-controlled Congress and the Republican-controlled White House.

On February 23, 2006, DPW volunteered to postpone its takeover of significant operations at the ports to give the White House more time to convince lawmakers that the deal poses no increased risks from terrorism.

According to the website of P&O Ports, the port-operations subsidiary of P&O, DPW would take over stevedore services at 12 East Coast ports including the Port of Portland (Maine); Port of Boston; Port of Davisville; Port of New York and New Jersey; Port Newark; Port of Philadelphia; Port of Camden; Port of Wilmington; Port of Baltimore; and Virginia locations at Newport News, Norfolk, and Portsmouth.

Additionally, DPW would have taken over P&O stevedoring operations at nine ports along the Gulf of Mexico including the Texas ports of Beaumont, Port Arthur, Galveston, Houston, Freeport, and Corpus Christi, as well as the Louisiana ports of Lake Charles and New Orleans.

Former Senate Majority Leader and 1996 Republican presidential candidate Bob Dole was hired by Dubai Ports World to lobby Congress on its behalf against bipartisan criticism of the deal. Mr. Dole was a special counsel in the Washington office of the law firm of Alston & Bird. DP World hired the firm in 2005 to help shepherd its purchase of the British-based firm P&OP&O.

On March 8, 2006, the House Appropriations Committee voted 62–2 to block the deal, and Senator Charles Schumer added amendments to a Senate bill to block the deal, causing an uproar in the Senate.

On March 9, 2006, Dubai Ports World released a statement saying they would turn over operation of U.S. ports to a U.S. "Entity". Later that same day, American Enterprise Institute scholar Norm Ornstein reported on PBS's "News Hour" that DP World was considering selling its U.S. operations to Halliburton.

Dubai Ports World eventually sold P&O's American operations to American International Group's asset management division, Global Investment Group for an undisclosed sum. The company is now known as Ports America. In New Jersey, it operates as Port Newark Container Terminal (PNCT). Highstar Capital is shopping the company. In 2017, a Turkish company sought to buy Ports America, which would bring it full circle to 2006.

== Opinions and comments ==
DP World's Portfolio - as of 1 March 2017

Container Terminals
Non-Container Terminals

New Developments and Major Expansions

According to Bill Gertz, author of Breakdown: How America's Intelligence Failures Led to September 11:

Intelligence and security officials opposed to the deal with Dubai Ports World said ports are vulnerable to the entry of terrorists or illicit weapons because of the large number of containers that enter U.S. territory, regardless of who manages them.

Frank Gaffney, president of the Center for Security Policy wrote:

At the very least, the company will have to be read-in on these ports' security plans as it will have some role in their implementation.

Susan Collins, Republican Senator from Maine (and Homeland Security Committee chairwoman at the time) wrote:

[A] careful review of the 'assurances letter' reveals that DP World is not, in fact, bound to provide the U.S. government with the information it would need to close the intelligence gaps the Coast Guard identified...The language is weak... Indeed, the assurances appear to amount to little more than a restatement of what the FBI or other law enforcement agenc[ies] could gather anyway in the course of an investigation.

After the DP World announced its decision to transfer the U.S. port operations to a U.S. entity, the BBC quoted Daniel T. Griswold, director of the Cato Institute's Center for Trade Policy Studies, as saying that the affair would "send a chilling signal":

It is just assuming that if a company is from the Middle East it is de facto disqualified from investing in the United States, and I think that is a terrible message to send.

=== Opposition ===
The objections to approving the sale centered on arguments about who controls U.S. ports, especially after the September 11, 2001 attacks. Some opposed to the sale have argued that no foreign government should be permitted to own such strategic assets while others argue that port security should remain in the hands of American firms under American control at the very least. Few had offered similar objections to the P&O's ownership, until the proposed DPW takeover brought attention to the situation. Over 80 percent of the terminals in the USA are already controlled by foreign owners.

Those who expressed opposition to the deal included: The New York Times, Michael Savage, Lindsey Graham, The New Republic, The John Birch Society, Sean Hannity, Lou Dobbs, Laura Ingraham, Bill Frist, and Hillary Clinton, as well as prominent politicians from two different parties, Bob Menendez and John Gibson. Then-Senator Barack Obama stated his opposition to the deal. So did Senators Carl Levin and John Kerry.

The objections commonly raised in public discourse differ from those lodged by Eller & Company, the Florida firm responsible for bringing national attention to the deal. Eller has two joint ventures with P&O and it feared becoming an "involuntary partner of DP World". For them, business rather than security or concerns over the approval process were the overriding factors driving their lobbying efforts to sink the deal.

Several additional arguments have circulated among critics of the deal, including:

- Review and approval of the acquisition by CFIUS was not sufficiently transparent and thorough, and never reached the proper level within the administration.
- Personal ties between the Bush administration and DP World, such as the appointment of David C. Sanborn to the Transportation Department's Maritime Administration portray a conflict of interest.

=== Support ===
Editorial support for the deal came from publications including the Financial Times, The Wall Street Journal, the Los Angeles Times, The Washington Post, The Economist and commentators including Tony Snow, Thomas Friedman, and John Warner.

Former President Bill Clinton advised top United Arab Emirates officials on how to address growing U.S. concerns over the acquisition but later stated "He told them that he didn't know the details about the deal." In a press conference, his spokesman Jay Carson stated Clinton "felt that any ports deal should be subject to the full scrutiny process and should also take steps to make ports safer, not maintain the status quo." However, his wife Senator Clinton was publicly opposed to the deal. Clarified in the same interview: "Like Senator Clinton and many others, he is concerned about foreign state ownership of our ports, and, to this end, he is supportive of her legislation," Carson told CNN.

Former Senate Majority Leader and 1996 Republican presidential candidate Bob Dole was a special counsel in the Washington office of the law firm Alston & Bird. DP World hired the firm in 2005 to help shepherd its purchase of the British-based firm Peninsular and Oriental. His wife, North Carolina Republican Senator Elizabeth Dole, has also raised questions about the Dubai-based company. The chairman of the North Carolina Democratic Party, Jerry Meek, publicly called on Senator Dole to remove herself from "any congressional oversight" of the Dubai port deal and stated, "The fact that Dubai is paying her husband to help pass the deal presents both a financial and ethical conflict of interest for Senator Dole."

The Bush administration and other supporters of the deal made the following arguments:

- The UAE has proven itself a strategic partner by allowing the U.S. military access to its land, ports and airspace for basing and operations in Iraq and Afghanistan;
- The UAE has allied with the U.S. in the Global War On Terror;
- Blocking the transfer of operating rights held by a British firm to an Arab firm appears discriminatory against Arabs;
- Security would remain a government responsibility as always, and performed by the United States Coast Guard and U.S. Customs and Border Protection.

Israel's largest container shipping firm, Zim Integrated Shipping Services, came out in support of the deal.

"During our long association with DP World, we have not experienced a single security issue in these ports or in any of the terminals operated by DP World... We are proud to be associated with DP World and look forward to working with them into the future." Zim Integrated Shipping Services Chairman of the Board, and main shareholder, Idan Ofer, February 22, 2006.

The controversy came shortly after the World Trade Organization's Doha Round of global trade talks. At which many member states called for the U.S. to open up its ports to international competition, in the same way that other industrialized nations have pushed poorer countries into opening up their service sectors (e.g. water, telecoms, etc.)

== Aftermath ==
In 2018, another UAE-based port operator, Gulftainer, won 50-year exclusive rights to operate and develop a port in the U.S. state of Delaware. The deal was seen as a breakthrough in UAE–US business relationships and that the "tide has turned" for UAE investors who wish to invest in the U.S.

== See also ==
- List of North American ports
- United States Coast Guard – Port and Waterways Security
- Supply-chain security
