= Enemy (disambiguation) =

An enemy is an individual or group that is seen as forcefully adverse or threatening.

Enemy or The Enemy may also refer to:

- Enemy combatant

== Arts, entertainment and media ==
=== Fictional entities ===
- The Enemy, an alias of Morgoth, in Tolkien's legendarium

=== Films ===
- The Enemy (1916 film), a lost silent drama
- The Enemy (1927 film), an American silent drama
- The Enemy (1952 film), an Italian melodrama
- The Enemy (1979 film), a Turkish drama
- Enemy (1990 film), an American action/adventure film
- The Enemy, a 2001 film starring Roger Moore
- Enemy (2013 film), a surrealist psychological thriller
- Enemmy, a 2013 Indian film
- Enemy (2015 film), an Indian mystery film
- Enemy (2021 film), an Indian Tamil-language action thriller

=== Gaming ===
- CIMA: The Enemy, a 2003 role-playing video game
- Enemy (eSports), a professional gaming team
- Enemy, a hostile non-player character that tries to harm the player in Video Games.

=== Literature ===
- The Enemy (Bagley novel), a 1977 espionage thriller by Desmond Bagley
- The Enemy (Child novel), a 2004 novel by Lee Child in the Jack Reacher series
- The Enemy (Higson novel), a 2009 young adult novel by Charlie Higson
- "The Enemy" (short story), by Damon Knight, 1958
- "The Enemy", a 1947 short story by Pearl S. Buck

=== Music ===
==== Groups ====
- Enemy (American band), an American band fronted by guitarist and vocalist Troy Van Leeuwen
- The Enemy (New Zealand band), a 1970s punk band from Dunedin, New Zealand
- The Enemy (English punk band), a 1980s punk band from Derby, Derbyshire, England
- The Enemy (English rock band), an indie rock band from Coventry, Warwickshire, England
- The Enemy, an American band with Journey drummer Deen Castronovo
- The Enemy, an American band with Charlie Farren from The Joe Perry Project
- The Enemy, an American punk band,formed in 1978, Seattle WA,USA

==== Albums and EPs ====
- Enemy (Kristeen Young album), 1999
- Enemy (Twice album), 2025
- Enemy (KMFDM album), 2026
- Enemy, an EP by Blood for Blood, 1997

==== Songs ====
- "Enemy" (Days of the New song), 1999
- "Enemy" (Drowning Pool song), 2007
- "Enemy" (Fozzy song), 2005
- "Enemy" (Sandro Cavazza song), 2019
- "Enemy" (Sevendust song), 2003
- "Enemy" (The Brilliant Green song), 2007
- "Enemy" (Imagine Dragons and JID song), 2021, for the League of Legends series Arcane
- "Enemy", by Altaria from Divinity, 2004
- "Enemy", by Beartooth from Disease, 2018
- "Enemy", by Blue Stahli from The Devil, 2013
- "Enemy", by Cascada from Original Me, 2011
- "Enemy", by Charli XCX from the album How I'm Feeling Now, 2020
- "Enemy", by Chris Brown from Heartbreak on a Full Moon, 2017
- "Enemy", by Eve 6 from Horrorscope, 2000
- "Enemy", by Masterplan from MK II, 2007
- "Enemy", by Nelly Furtado from The Spirit Indestructible, 2012
- "Enemy", by The Plot in You from Swan Song, 2021
- "Enemy", by Scars On Broadway from their eponymous album, 2008
- "Enemy", by Swallow the Sun from Moonflowers, 2021
- "Enemy", by Twice from Enemy, 2025
- "Enemy", by Wage War from Blueprints, 2015
- "Enemy", by Wolves at the Gate from Eclipse, 2019
- "Enemy", by Yung Lean and Bladee from Psykos, 2024
- "The Enemy" (Godsmack song), 2006
- "The Enemy" (Paradise Lost song), 2007
- "The Enemy", by Anthrax from Spreading the Disease, 1985
- "The Enemy", by Dark Tranquillity from Damage Done, 2002
- "The Enemy", by Guided by Voices from Isolation Drills, 2001
- "The Enemy", by Memphis May Fire from This Light I Hold, 2016

=== Television ===
- "The Enemy", a 1995 episode of Space: Above and Beyond
- "The Enemy" (Star Trek: The Next Generation), 1989

== Other uses ==
- The Enemy (film company), a film production company run by John Harlacher and Dave Buchwald
- TheEnemy, a Brazilian gaming website hosted by Omelete

== See also ==
- Enemies (disambiguation)
- Enemy Mine (disambiguation)
- Public enemy (disambiguation)
- The enemy of my enemy (disambiguation)
- The Enemy Within (disambiguation)
