= Desencuentro (1997 TV series) =

- Genre: Telenovela; Romance; Drama
- Created by: Caridad Bravo Adams; Luis Moreno
- Written by: Liliana Abud; Carmen Daniels; Jorge Lozano Soriano; Tere Medina
- Directed by: Claudio Reyes Rubio; Carlos Guerra Villareal
- Starring: Juan Ferrara; Daniela Castro; Alma Muriel; Ernesto Laguardia
- Opening theme: Desencuentros by Jorge Avendaño; Desencuentro by Daniela Castro
- Country of origin: Mexico
- Original language: Spanish
- No. of episodes: 100 (40 half-episodes, 60 full-episodes, for a total of 80 full episodes)

Production
- Executive producer: Ernesto Alonso
- Producer: Luis Miguel Barona
- Production locations: Filming; Televisa San Ángel; Mexico City, Mexico
- Cinematography: Carlos Guerra Villareal; Víctor Soto
- Running time: 21-22 minutes (episodes 1-40); 41-44 minutes (episodes 41-100)
- Production company: Televisa

Original release
- Network: Canal de las Estrellas
- Release: November 17, 1997 – April 3, 1998

Related
- El Enemigo (1961); El Enemigo (1979)

Desencuentro (English: Disagreement) is a Mexican telenovela produced by Ernesto Alonso for Televisa in 1997.

On Monday, November 17, 1997, Canal de las Estrellas started broadcasting Desencuentro weekdays at 8:00pm, replacing Esmeralda. The last episode was broadcast on Friday, April 3, 1998, with Vivo por Elena replacing it the following Monday.

The telenovela starred Juan Ferrara, Daniela Castro, Alma Muriel and Ernesto Laguardia.

== Cast ==
- Juan Ferrara as Andrés Rivera
- Daniela Castro as Victoria San Román Jiménez
- Alma Muriel as Valentina Quintana de Rivera
- Ernesto Laguardia as Luis Torres
- Juan Peláez as Esteban Aguirre
- María Victoria as Julia
- Leticia Perdigón as Chaquira
- Luz María Jerez as Sandra Lombardo
- Sergio Ramos "El Comanche" as Rufino
- Miguel Pizarro as Toni
- Juan Manuel Bernal as Sergio Estévez
- Emilia Carranza as Inés Altamirano
- Eugenio Cobo as Fernando Estévez
- María Eugenia Ríos as Queta
- Manuel Ojeda as Alfredo San Román Isunza
- Guillermo Aguilar as Dr. Álvaro Reyes
- Roberto Antúnez as Abel
- Dacia Arcaráz as Lolita
- Kuno Becker as David Rivera Quintana
- Ofelia Guilmáin as Jovita
- Lucía Guilmáin as Laura
- Bárbara Gómez as Encarnación
- Aarón Hernán as Matías
- Maty Huitrón as Lidia
- Silvia Manríquez as Alma
- Paulina Martell as Maru Torres
- Maricruz Nájera as Rosario
- David Rencoret as Roberto Calderón
- Fernando Robles as Manuel
- Héctor Sáez as Chiripas
- Oscar Traven as José Joaquín
- Ana de la Reguera as Beatriz
- Leonardo Mackey as Carlos
- Elizabeth Arciniega as Marisa
- Virginia Gimeno as Aurora
- Víctor Lozada as Benito
- Alberto Loztin as Samuel
- Claudia Ortega as Rosalba
- Georgina Pedret as Maricarmen
- Thelma Dorantes as Sara
- Sylvia Suárez as Hilda
- Jacqueline Andere as Herself
- Pilar Pellicer as Herself
- María Rubio as Herself
