= My Enemy =

My Enemy may refer to:

- "My Enemy" (Chvrches song), 2018
- "My Enemy" (Skid Row song), 1995
- "My Enemy", a 2011 song by Amorphis from The Beginning of Times
- ”My Enemy” (Hans Zimmer song), a 2014 song by Hans Zimmer from The Amazing Spider-Man 2 soundtrack
- "My Enemy", a 2014 song by The Haunted from Exit Wounds
- "My Enemy", a 2004 song by Juliana Hatfield from In Exile Deo
- "My Enemy", a 2018 song by The Word Alive from Violent Noise

== See also ==
- Enemy (disambiguation)
- Enemy Mine (disambiguation)
