= Pekka Heino =

Pekka Heino may refer to:

- Pekka Heino (television presenter) (born 1961), Sweden television host and presenter
- Pekka Heino (singer) (born 1976), Finnish metal singer
