= The Fallen Empire =

Studio album by Altaria
- Released: 24 March 2006
- Genre: Heavy metal; power metal
- Length: 45:50
- Label: Metal Heaven

Altaria chronology
Divinity (2004)	The Fallen Empire (2006)	Unholy (2009)

Professional ratings
Review scores
Source	Rating
Metal Centre	9/10
Metal Temple	7/10
Metal.de	5/10
Stormbringer	3.5/5

The Fallen Empire is the third studio album by Finnish metal band Altaria, released on 24 March 2006. It is their first album with guitarist Juha Pekka Alanen, and their last album with bassist Marko Pukkila and vocalist Taage Laiho until their 2022 album Wisdom.

== Track listing ==
1. "Disciples" – 6:12
2. "Valley of Rainbows" – 4:21
3. "Abyss of Twilight" – 4:49
4. "Frozen Hearts" – 4:39
5. "Crucifix" – 3:30
6. "Showdown" – 3:38
7. "The Lion" – 4:57
8. "Outlaw Blood" – 4:12
9. "Chosen One" – 4:12
10. "Access Denied" – 5:20
11. "The Dying Flame" – 7:55
12. "Metality" (Japanese edition bonus track) – 5:02

== Personnel ==
- Taage Laiho – vocals
- Juha Pekka Alanen – guitars, keyboards
- Marko Pukkila – bass
- Tony Smedjebacka – drums
