= Heart Full of Fire =

Album by Brother Firetribe

Studio album by Brother Firetribe
- Released: 6 May 2008
- Genre: Hard rock
- Length: 44:35
- Label: Spinefarm, Universal
- Producer: Emppu Vuorinen

Brother Firetribe chronology
False Metal/Break Out (2006)	Heart Full of Fire (2008)	Diamond in the Firepit (2014)

Professional ratings
Review scores
Source	Rating
AllMusic	link

Heart Full of Fire is the second full-length album by the Finnish rock band Brother Firetribe. It was released by Spinefarm Records in 2008. It was produced and co-engineered by Vuorinen with the whole group having written all the songs except for "Chasing the Angels" which was written by John Lewis Parker (originally written for Mike Reno of Loverboy).

AllMusic's Eduardo Rivadavia gave the album 3.5 stars out of 5, calling it "A throwback in every sense of the word." He went on to say that "The album's 11 tracks pulse with the same familiar combination of catchy choruses, muscular guitar riffs, anthemic synthesizer melodies, and sparkling clean production values that original genre purveyors like Journey, REO Speedwagon, and Foreigner (to name but a few) ruled the airwaves with in the early '80s, but which haven't really dented the American charts since Giant's early-'90s attempts."

The song "I Am Rock" was originally recorded for a Finnish TV series called Pelkkää lihaa.

== Track listing ==
- All songs written by Brother Firetribe, except where noted.
1. Who Will You Run to Now? 4:30
2. Wildest Dreams 3:57
3. Runaways 3:57
4. Game They Call Love 3:45
5. Play It from the Heart 4:21
6. Heart Full of Fire 4:10
7. Heard It on My Radio 3:23
8. Going Out with a Bang 3:57
9. Out of My Head 4:18
10. Chasing the Angels 4:13 (John Lewis Parker)
11. I Am Rock 3:44

== Personnel ==
- Pekka Ansio Heino: Lead Vocals
- Emppu Vuorinen: Electric & Acoustic Guitars
- Tomppa Nikulainen: Keyboards, Synthesizers
- Jason Flinck: Bass, Backing Vocals
- Kalle Torniainen: Drums, Percussion

=== Additional personnel ===
- Anette Olzon: Vocals on "Heart Full of Fire"
- Sammy Salminen, Juice Wahlsten and Sanuel Hjelt: Vocals on "I Am Rock"
- Timo Silvast: Additional keyboards

== Production ==
- Arranged by Brother Firetribe
- Produced by Tomppa Nikulainen & Emppu Vuorinen
- Recorded by Tomppa Nikulainen & Emppu Vuorinen at Nitro/Legendary E-Major Studios
- Drums Recorded by Tero Kinnunen, at Sonic Pump Studios/Legendary E-Major Studios
- Mixed by Torsti Spoof & Jesse Vainio at Studio Audio except 'I Am Rock' mixed by Jesse Vainio at Sonic Pump Studios
- Mastered by Svante Forsback at Chartmakers
- Artwork and design by Hugh Gilmour
- Photography by Carda/Metalphotos
- Additional photo retouching by Janne Peltonen
