= Unholy (Altaria album) =

Studio album by Altaria
- Released: 28 August 2009
- Genre: Heavy metal; hard rock
- Length: 45:41
- Label: Escape Music

Altaria chronology
The Fallen Empire (2006)	Unholy (2009)	Wisdom (2022)

Professional ratings
Review scores
Source	Rating
Melodic	3/5
Metal Asylum	5/10
Stormbringer	4/5

Unholy is the fourth studio album by Finnish metal band Altaria, released on 28 August 2009. It is their last album before their hiatus and split, their first album with guitarist Petri Aho, and their only album with bassist/vocalist Marco Luponero.

== Track listing ==
1. "Alterior Motive" – 3:59
2. "Warrior" – 4:12
3. "Unholy Invasion" – 3:49
4. "Pride & Desire" – 3:05
5. "The Lake" – 5:29
6. "Danger Zone" – 3:21
7. "Steal Your Thunder" – 3:23
8. "Wind Beneath My Wings" – 3:31
9. "We Own the Fire" – 3:51
10. "Ready!" – 2:54
11. "Never Wonder Why" – 3:36
12. "Underdog" – 4:31

== Personnel ==
- Marco Luponero – lead vocals, bass
- Petri Aho – guitars, backing vocals
- Juha Pekka Alanen – guitars
- Tony Smedjebacka – drums
