= Enemies: How America's Foes Steal Our Vital Secrets – And How We Let It Happen =

2006 book by Bill Gertz

- Author: Bill Gertz
- Language: English
- Subject: United States Politics; Terrorism
- Genre: non-fiction
- Publisher: Three Rivers Press
- Publication date: 19 September 2006
- Publication place: United States
- Pages: 304
- ISBN: 978-0-307-33806-8

Enemies: How America's Foes Steal Our Vital Secrets – And How We Let It Happen is a 2006 book by Bill Gertz. In this book, Gertz brings to light instances where national security had been damaged by negligence and incompetence. Gertz makes the claim that more high-level attention is needed, as well as more resources, better leadership and proactive programs.

== Background ==
Enemies is a 2006 book by Bill Gertz. Gertz argues that the US has allowed itself to be penetrated by China, Russia and Cuba - and nominally friendly nations - due to negligence. Gertz reports on intelligence gathering in America by China, Cuba and North Korea.

== Content ==
The following topics are discussed in the book:

- How FBI informant Katrina Leung and her FBI handler J. J. Smith helped China obtain secrets on US electronic eavesdropping.
- New details on the technical intelligence-gathering spy ring of Tai Mak and Chi Mak, two brothers arrested for supplying China with vital defense technology.
- How information compromised to China allows Beijing to track US Virginia class submarines.
- How the CIA was informed in 1999 that at least three of its clandestine service officers were on the payroll of Chinese intelligence, but the agency failed to find the spies.
- How China has established a special, ultra-secret intelligence unit tasked with planting spies inside the US government.
- How China ran a high-level penetration agent inside the US government code-named “Mother”.
- How the FBI mistakenly hounded CIA counterintelligence officer Brian Kelley and his family for nearly two years, while the real target of the mole hunt, FBI Agent Robert Hanssen, operated freely and passed secrets to Moscow.
- How Russia has dispatched scores of intelligence operatives to the United States, rivalling Cold War levels of spying.
- How weak counter-intelligence has allowed terrorists to infiltrate the US military and gain access to US secrets.
- How North Korea conducted intelligence-related abductions of Japanese nationals.
- How Cuba penetrated the Defense Intelligence Agency and other agencies with high-level mole Ana Montes, who spied to help Nicaragua's Sandinistas and then became Cuba's most important agent.
- How British military intelligence penetrated the terrorist Irish Republican Army with an agent code-named Stakeknife.

== Critical reception ==
This book is a national and New York Times Bestseller. The FBI General Overviews 2000s A-G favorably reviewed the book.
