= Betrayal (Gertz book) =

1999 book on Clinton's foreign policy

- Author: Bill Gertz
- Language: English
- Subject: Clinton administration
- Genre: Non-fiction, politics
- Published: 1999
- Publisher: Regnery Publishing
- Publication place: United States
- Media type: Print (hardback, paperback), e-book
- Pages: 291 pages (paperback)
- ISBN: 0-89526-317-3

Betrayal: How the Clinton Administration Undermined American Security is a 1999 book by reporter Bill Gertz. It was first published on May 25, 1999 through Regnery Publishing and centers upon the Clinton administration.

== Synopsis ==
In the book Gertz argues that:

- Bill Clinton's foreign policy strategies of "appeasement" with China and Russia have resulted in a betrayal of American interests, leaving "the United States weaker militarily as its enemies grow stronger and the world becomes more dangerous."
- Clinton's policies compromised national security by opposing development of a missile defense system similar to one the Russians are developing.
- "The Clinton administration's sale of sophisticated computer and satellite technology to China was influenced by campaign contributions to the Democrats from Chinese and American executives."

== Reception ==
Critical reception has been mixed, but has received praise from former Director of Central Intelligence R. James Woolsey, Jr. John R. Bolton wrote a mostly favorable review for Betrayal, commenting that it was a "rather straightforward reporting covering about six years of a dangerously flawed presidency". He also criticized it for "[depending] on government sources leaking classified information" but also stated that "this unfortunate fact only underlines just how corrosive the Clinton administration’s approach has been." The Bulletin of the Atomic Scientists also commented on Gertz's usage of leaked sources, which they felt weakened the book along with the author's "zeal to blame Bill Clinton for security failings both real and imagined".
