= Divorciadas =

- Genre: Telenovela; Drama
- Created by: Julia Guzmán
- Directed by: Rafael Banquells
- Starring: Ariadna Welter; Ofelia Guilmáin; Susana Cabrera
- Country of origin: Mexico
- Original language: Spanish
- No. of episodes: 60

Production
- Executive producer: Ernesto Alonso
- Running time: 30 minutes

Original release
- Network: Telesistema Mexicano
- Release: 1961 – 1961

Related
- Culpas ajenas; Don Bosco

Divorciadas (English title: Divorced) is a Mexican telenovela produced by Televisa and transmitted by Telesistema Mexicano.

Ariadna Welter, Ofelia Guilmáin and Susana Cabrera starred as protagonists.

== Cast ==
- Ariadna Welter
- Ofelia Guilmáin
- Susana Cabrera
- Manolita Saval
- Dina de Marco
- Germán Robles
- Ramón Bugarini
