= Elena (TV series) =

- Genre: Telenovela; Drama
- Created by: Estela Calderón
- Directed by: Rafael Banquells
- Starring: Silvia Derbez; Carlos López Moctezuma; Roberto Cañedo
- Country of origin: Mexico
- Original language: Spanish

Production
- Executive producer: Valentín Pimstein
- Running time: 30 minutes

Original release
- Network: Telesistema Mexicano
- Release: 1961 – 1961

Related
- Don Bosco; El enemigo; Esa provinciana (1974)

Elena is a Mexican telenovela produced by Televisa and transmitted by Telesistema Mexicano.

Silvia Derbez and Carlos López Moctezuma starred as protagonists.

== Cast ==
- Silvia Derbez
- Carlos López Moctezuma
- Roberto Cañedo
- Carlos Navarro
- Dalia Iñiguez
- Miguel Arenas
- Fedora Capdevila
- Dolores Tinoco
- Humberto Valdepeña
