= Bill Gertz =

American editor, columnist and reporter (born 1952)

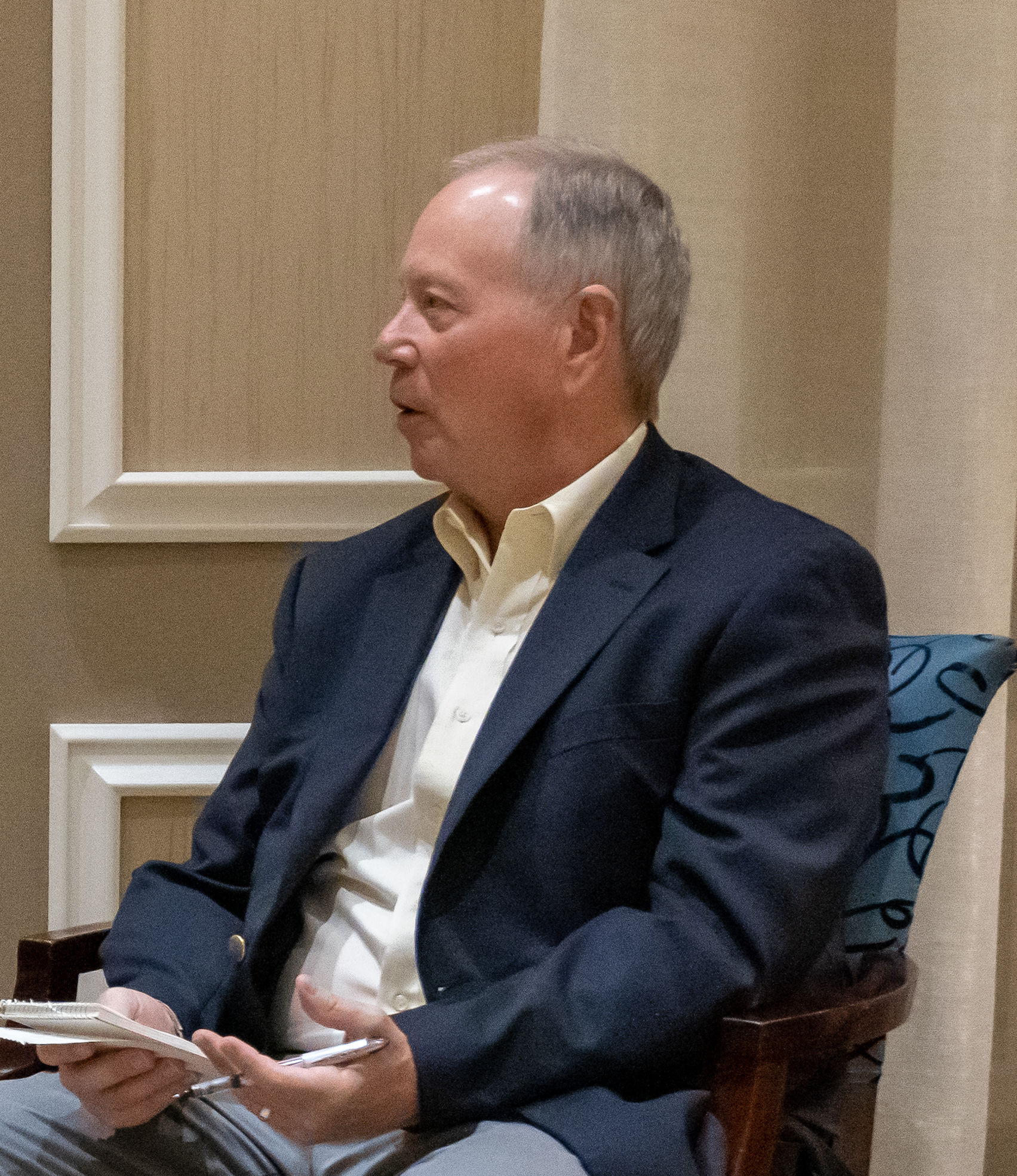
- Gertz in 2020
- Born: March 28, 1952 (age 73); Long Island, New York, U.S.
- Occupations: Editor, columnist, reporter

William D. Gertz (born March 28, 1952) is an American editor, columnist and reporter for The Washington Times. He is the author of eight books.

== Biography ==
Gertz has been a media fellow at the Hoover Institution on War, Revolution and Peace at Stanford University.

In 2008, Gertz was subpoenaed to the Santa Ana, California federal court to testify in the case of Chi Mak, who was convicted of providing United States Navy technology to China. Gertz refused to answer questions about his sources, citing the Fifth Amendment.

Gertz was a senior editor at the Washington Free Beacon until October 2019, when he was fired upon the discovery of "a previously undisclosed financial transaction." Gertz had taken a US$100,000 loan from Guo Wengui, whom Gertz called a "leading Chinese dissident" in his reports. Gertz later rejoined The Washington Times full time.

== Writings ==
His 2002 book, Breakdown: How America's Intelligence Failures Led to Sept. 11, examined the activities of United States intelligence agencies prior to the 2001 terrorist attacks. His 2008 book, The Failure Factory: How Unelected Bureaucrats, Liberal Democrats, and Big Government Republicans Are Undermining America's Security and Leading Us to War, said that many federal bureaucrats hold liberal views on foreign policy.

== Books ==
- Betrayal: How the Clinton Administration Undermined American Security (1999)
- The China Threat: How the People's Republic Targets America (2000)
- Breakdown: How America's Intelligence Failures Led to September 11 (2002)
- Treachery: How America’s Friends and Foes Are Secretly Arming Our Enemies (2004)
- Enemies: How America's Foes Steal Our Vital Secrets – And How We Let It Happen (2006)
- The Failure Factory: How Unelected Bureaucrats, Liberal Democrats, and Big Government Republicans Are Undermining America's Security and Leading Us to War (2008)
- iWar: War and Peace in the Information Age (2017)
- Deceiving the Sky: Inside Communist China's Drive for Global Supremacy (2019)
