= Los Enemigos =

Los Enemigos (English: The Enemies) may refer to:

- "Enemigos" (song), a 2020 song by Aitana and Reik
- Los Enemigos (film), a 1983 Argentine film
- Los Enemigos (opera), an opera by Mesías Maiguashca
- Los Enemigos (band), a Spanish rock band

== See also ==
- El Enemigo (disambiguation)
