= Culpas ajenas =

Mexican telenovela

- Genre: Telenovela; Drama
- Starring: Silvia Caos; Raúl Farell; Carmelita González
- Country of origin: Mexico
- Original language: Spanish

Production
- Running time: 30 minutes

Original release
- Network: Telesistema Mexicano
- Release: 1961 – 1961

Related
- Cuatro en la trampa; Divorciadas

Culpas ajenas (English title: Sins of others) is a Mexican telenovela produced by Televisa and transmitted by Telesistema Mexicano.

Silvia Caos and Raúl Farell starred as protagonists.

== Cast ==
- Silvia Caos
- Raúl Farell
- Carmelita González
- Roberto Cañedo
- Francisco Jambrina
