= Divinity (album) =

Studio album by Altaria
- Released: 24 May 2004
- Recorded: 2003
- Genre: Heavy metal; power metal
- Length: 46:28
- Label: Metal Heaven

Altaria chronology
Invitation (2003)	Divinity (2004)	The Fallen Empire (2006)

Professional ratings
Review scores
Source	Rating
Metal.de	5/10
Stormbringer	3/5

Divinity is the second studio album by Finnish metal band Altaria, released on 24 May 2004. It is their first album with vocalist Taage Laiho, and their last album with guitarists Jani Liimatainen and Emppu Vuorinen, the latter of whom having left the band two months before the album's release. The album was mixed in February 2004 at Tico Tico Studio, known for mixing albums by other Finnish metal bands like Sonata Arctica, Sentenced, and For My Pain.... The limited digipak edition includes a cover of "Balls to the Wall" by Accept, featuring HammerFall vocalist Joacim Cans.

== Track listing ==
1. "Unchain the Rain" – 3:43
2. "Will to Live" – 3:57
3. "Prophet of Pestilence" – 3:49
4. "Darkened Highlight" – 3:39
5. "Discovery" – 3:53
6. "Falling Again" – 4:14
7. "Divine" – 3:57
8. "Haven" – 3:41
9. "Try to Remember" – 3:39
10. "Stain on the Switchblade" – 3:28
11. "Enemy" – 4:16
12. "Final Warning" – 4:08
13. "Balls to the Wall" (Accept cover) (limited digipak edition bonus track) – 4:55

== Personnel ==
- Taage Laiho – vocals
- Jani Liimatainen – guitars, keyboards
- Emppu Vuorinen – guitars
- Marko Pukkila – bass
- Tony Smedjebacka – drums
