= Don Bosco (TV series) =

- Genre: Telenovela; Drama
- Created by: Benjamín de la Torre Haro
- Directed by: Jesús Valero
- Country of origin: Mexico
- Original language: Spanish
- No. of episodes: 51

Production
- Running time: 30 minutes

Original release
- Network: Telesistema Mexicano
- Release: 1961 – 1961

Related
- Divorciadas; Elena

Don Bosco is a Mexican telenovela produced by Televisa and transmitted by Telesistema Mexicano.

== Cast ==
- Rafael Bertrand
- Alicia Montoya
- Nicolás Rodríguez
- Alberto Galán
- Josefina Escobedo
- Antonio Passy
- Pepito Morán
- Luis Gimeno
- Roberto Araya
- Armando Gutierrez
