= Brother Firetribe =

Finnish hard rock band

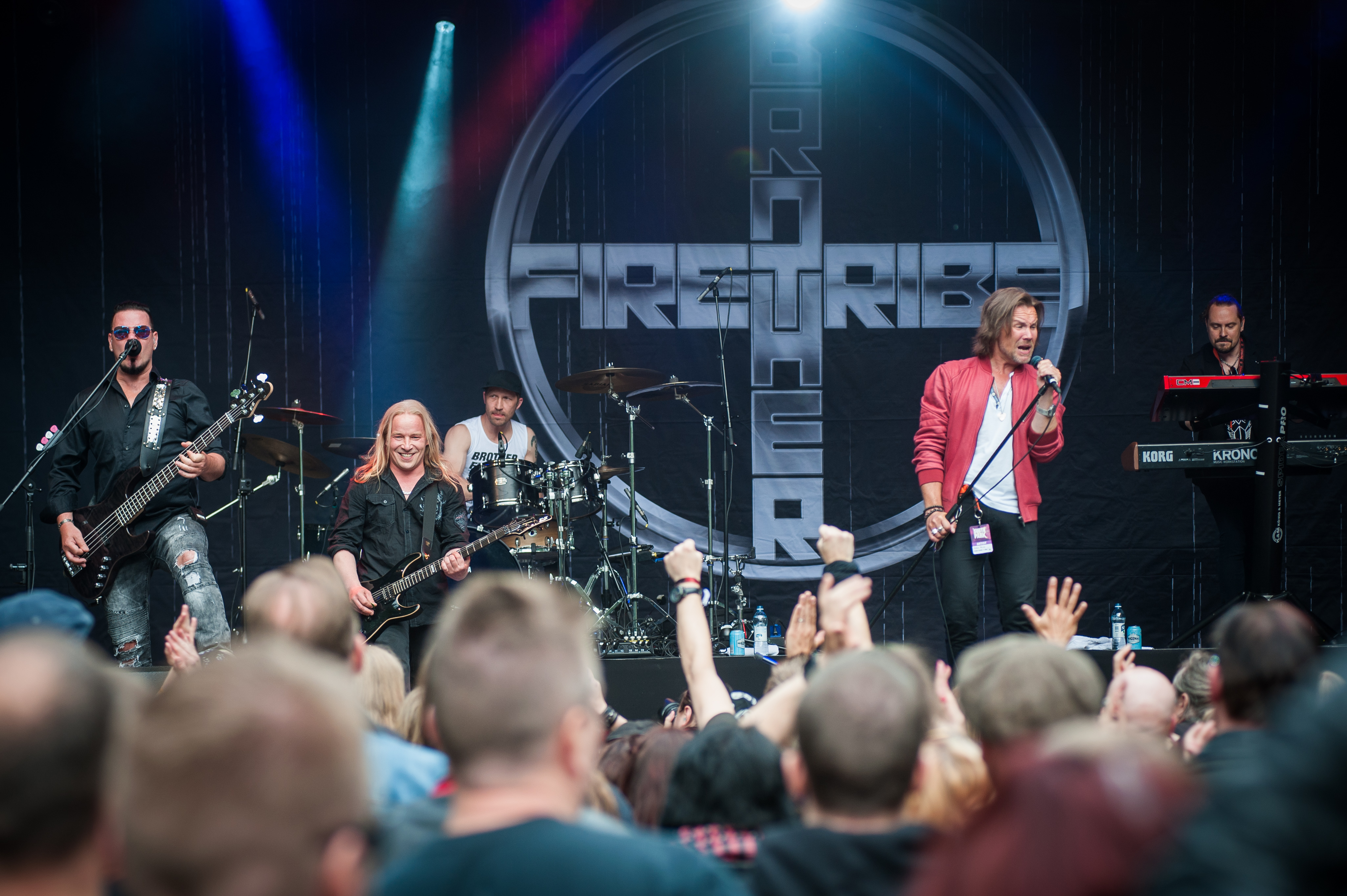
- Brother Firetribe at the South Park festival in Tampere, Finland in June 2018.

Background information
- Origin: Finland
- Genres: Hard rock, AOR
- Years active: 2002–present
- Labels: Spinefarm Records
- Members: Pekka Ansio Heino; Jason Flinck; Tomppa Nikulainen; Hannes Pirilä; Roope Riihijärvi
- Past members: Kalle Torniainen; Emppu Vuorinen
- Website: brotherfiretribe.com

Brother Firetribe is a Finnish hard rock band. They take their name from a direct English translation of the name of the former professional tennis player Veli Paloheimo. The name is a reference to an in-joke, where the perfect description for their music is "tennis heavy metal".

== History ==
The band was formed in 2002 in Kerava when vocalist Pekka Heino, keyboardist Tomi Nikulainen and bassist Jason Flinck met with guitarist Emppu Vuorinen.

Their first album False Metal was released by Spinefarm in 2006. The first album was later re-issued as Break Out.

In 2009 Brother Firetribe joined Pain on the "European Cynic Campaign 2009" tour. Pain also toured with Nightwish, and Emppu Vuorinen, one of Nightwish's founding members, was the guitarist for Brother Firetribe. The band appeared at Nottingham Trent University's Rockingham Festival 2017.

Founding guitarist Emppu Vuorinen stepped down from the band in February 2020, citing lack of time due to his commitments with Nightwish. Latest album, Feel the Burn, was released in 2020, the first to feature new guitarist Roope Riihijärvi. Two tracks feature Vuorinen, who was still in the band when work on the album began.

Brother Firetribe has released five studio albums and one live DVD.

== Members ==
- Pekka Ansio Heino – vocals (2002–present)
- Jason Flinck – bass, backing vocals (2002–present)
- Tomppa Nikulainen – keyboards (2002–present)
- Hannes Pirilä – drums, percussion (2014–present)
- Roope Riihijärvi – guitars (2020–present)

Former Members

- Kalle Torniainen – drums, percussion (2002–2014)
- Emppu Vuorinen – guitars (2002–2020)

== Discography ==
=== Albums ===
Year	Album	Peak positions
Year	Album	FIN
2006	False Metal	22
2008	Heart Full of Fire	6
2014	Diamond in the Firepit	7
2017	Sunbound	5
2020	Feel the Burn	5
2025	Number One	18

=== Singles and EPs ===
Year	Single / EP	Peak positions	Album
Year	Single / EP	FIN	Album
2006	"One Single Breath"	—	False Metal
2006	"I'm on Fire"	10	False Metal
2007	"I Am Rock"	6	Heart Full of Fire
2008	"Heart Full of Fire... And Then Some"	8	Heart Full of Fire
2008	"Runaways"	6	Heart Full of Fire
2014	"For Better or for Worse"	6	Diamond in the Firepit
2016	"Taste of a Champion"		Sunbound
2017	"Indelible Heroes"		Sunbound
2020	"Night Drive"		Feel the Burn

=== DVDs ===
Year	Album
2010	Live at Apollo
