= Death at Nuremberg =

2017 novel by W.E.B. Griffin and William E. Butterworth IV

- First edition
- Author: W.E.B. Griffin and William E. Butterworth IV
- Language: English
- Series: Clandestine Operations Series
- Genre: Spy novel
- Publisher: G. P. Putnam's Sons
- Publication date: December 26, 2017
- Publication place: United States
- Media type: Print (hardcover)
- Pages: 448 pp (first edition, hardcover)
- ISBN: 978-0399176746
- Preceded by: Curtain of Death (2016)
- Followed by: The Enemy of My Enemy (2018)

Death at Nuremberg is the fourth novel in the Clandestine Operations Series by W.E.B. Griffin and William E. Butterworth IV.

== Plot ==
This novel centers around Capt. James Cronley, the primary character of all the novels of the series. Cronley has been replaced as chief of DCI Europe to protect the U.S. chief prosecutor in the Nuremberg trials from a rumored Soviet kidnapping. He soon gets charged with hunting down the leadership of Odessa, an organization that helps Nazi war criminals escape to South America. As Cronley gets closer to uncovering the workings of Odessa, he is targeted twice for assassination. Cronley's quest takes him to his mother's home town of Strasbourg and to Vienna. At Strasbourg, he picks up his cousin Luther, who turns out to be a war criminal himself and is taken to Nuremberg. As with the other books in this series, Death at Nuremberg is filled with intrigue as agents of the fledgling CIA work to rid the United States of enemies in Europe.

== Reviews ==
The Real Book Spy website enjoyed this book, up to a point, saying in its review of it, "While it’s a step up from last year’s Curtain of Death, this year’s offering is still bloated with unnecessary sequences and far too many throwaway characters." The historical novel society was also indifferent in its review of this book, saying, "Readers who enjoy twisty stories and the convoluted politics and maneuverings following war may enjoy this novel, but those seeking tension and suspense may want to look elsewhere."

Elise Cooper, in a review on the BlackFive website, made a more positive evaluation of this book, "Griffin’s signature writing style is very evident as he blends humor, espionage, danger, and great characters in his latest novel." A review on the bookreporter website also enjoyed this book.
