= The Enemy of My Enemy =

The Enemy of My Enemy may refer to:

- The Enemy of My Enemy (Michael book), a 2006 book by political science professor George Michael
- The Enemy of My Enemy (novel), a 2018 novel by W.E.B. Griffin and William E. Butterworth IV
- The Enemy of My Enemy (Charlie Jade), an episode of the TV series Charlie Jade
- The Enemy of My Enemy (Robin Hood), an episode of the TV series Robin Hood

== See also ==
- The enemy of my enemy is my friend, an ancient proverb
- "Enemy of My Enemy", a 2012 episode of science-fiction drama Fringe
- Enemy's Enemy, a novel in the Carl Hamilton series by Jan Guillou
