= Altaria (band) =

Finnish heavy metal band

- Origin: Jakobstad, Finland
- Genres: Heavy metal, progressive metal, power metal, hard rock
- Years active: 2000–2016, 2020–present
- Label: Metal Heaven
- Members: Marko Pukkila; Tony Smedjebacka; Juha Pekka Alanen; Taage Laiho; Petri Aho
- Past members: Marco Luponero; Jani Liimatainen; Johan Mattjus; Jouni Nikula; Emppu Vuorinen
- Website: Altaria on Facebook

Altaria is a Finnish heavy metal band from Jakobstad, who have released four albums including a compilation on the record label Metal Heaven, a fifth on Escape Music and a sixth on Reaper Entertainment.

== History ==
In January 2008, the band decided to part ways with their record label Metal Heaven for undisclosed reasons. In the same month, bass player Marko Pukkila parted ways with the band after an argument concerning the split with Metal Heaven, and was replaced as vocalist by Ex-Terrorwheel bass player, Marco Luponero. After that, the only original member still active with Altaria at the time was Tony Smedjebacka.

Towards the later part of 2008 the band announced on their website that they were in the process of writing songs for their fifth (fourth full) studio album. In March 2009, they stated that they had finished recording 12 tracks for their upcoming release. The title had yet to be confirmed, but one track had already been completed, entitled "Pride and Desire". Altaria's fifth studio album, Unholy, was released in May 2009.

After nearly five years of inactivity, the band, together with former bass player Marko Pukkila got together for Altaria's final concert at Nummirock 2016 on 23 June.

In December 2019, the band announced through their new website that the 2006 lineup had returned, and were recording material for a sixth album for a late 2020 release. They also remastered their second album, Divinity, which was released on 27 March 2020. In April 2022, the band announced their new album, Wisdom, would be released on 8 July.

== Band members ==
Current

- Tony Smedjebacka – drums (2000–2016, 2020–present)
- Marko Pukkila – bass (2000–2008, 2016, 2020–present)
- Taage Laiho – lead vocals (2003–2006, 2020–present)
- Juha Pekka Alanen – guitar (2005–2016, 2020–present)
- Petri Aho – guitar (2006–2016, 2020–present; live member: 2004)

Former

- Jani Liimatainen – guitars, keyboards (2000–2005, 2016)
- Johan Mattjus – lead vocals (2000–2001)
- Emppu Vuorinen – guitars (2002–2004)
- Jouni Nikula – lead vocals (2002–2003)
- Marco Luponero – lead vocals (2006–2016), bass (2008–2016)

== Discography ==
- Sleeping Visions (2001 demo)
- Feed the Fire (2002 demo)
- Invitation (Metal Heaven, 2003)
- Divinity (Metal Heaven, 2004)
- The Fallen Empire (Metal Heaven, 2006)
- Divine Invitation (2007 compilation)
- Unholy (Escape Music, 2009)
- Wisdom (Reaper Entertainment, 2022)
