= False Metal =

Album by Brother Firetribe

Studio album by Brother Firetribe
- Released: 2006
- Genre: Hard rock, AOR
- Length: 44:35
- Label: Spinefarm
- Producer: Emppu Vuorinen

Brother Firetribe chronology
False Metal (2006)	Heart Full of Fire (2008)

False Metal (later reissued as Break Out) is the debut album from the Finnish rock band Brother Firetribe.

== Track listing ==
1. Break Out
2. Valerie
3. I'm On Fire
4. Love Goes Down
5. Devil's Daughter
6. Midnite Queen
7. One Single Breath
8. Lover Tonite
9. Spanish Eyes
10. Kill City Kid

== Personnel ==
- Pekka Ansio Heino: Lead vocals
- Emppu Vuorinen: Electric and acoustic guitars
- Tomppa Nikulainen: Keyboards, synthesizers
- Jason Flinck: Bass, backing vocals
- Kalle Torniainen: Drums, percussion
