= Invitation (Altaria album) =

Studio album by Altaria
- Released: 23 June 2003
- Recorded: Late 2002 – January 2003
- Genres: Progressive metal; power metal
- Length: 42:22
- Label: Metal Heaven

Altaria chronology
Invitation (2003)	Divinity (2004)

Professional ratings
Review scores
Source	Rating
Metal.de	6/10
Rock Hard	7.5/10

Invitation is the debut studio album by Finnish metal band Altaria, released on 23 June 2003. It is their only album with vocalist Jouni Nikula. Also in the lineup were two well-known guitarists in the Finnish power metal scene, Jani Liimatainen and Emppu Vuorinen.

== Track listing ==
1. "Unicorn" – 3:32
2. "History of Times to Come" – 4:16
3. "Ravenwing" – 4:30
4. "Innocent" – 4:14
5. "Wrath of a Warchild" – 4:13
6. "Kingdom of the Night" – 2:55
7. "Fire & Ice" – 3:26
8. "House of My Soul" – 3:28
9. "Immortal Disorder" – 3:35
10. "Here I Am" – 3:53
11. "Emerald Eye" – 4:20

== Personnel ==
- Jouni Nikula – vocals
- Jani Liimatainen – guitars, keyboards
- Emppu Vuorinen – guitars
- Marko Pukkila – bass
- Tony Smedjebacka – drums
