= Enemies =

Enemies or foes are a group that is seen as forcefully adverse or threatening.

Enemies may also refer to:

== Literature ==
- Enemies (play), a 1906 play by Maxim Gorky
- Enemies, A Love Story, a 1966 novel by Isaac Bashevis Singer
- Enemies: How America's Foes Steal Our Vital Secrets – And How We Let It Happen, a 2006 non-fiction book by Bill Gertz

== Film ==
- Enemies (1940 film), a German film
- Enemies (1953 film), a Soviet drama film
- Enemies, a 1971 TV film directed by Fielder Cook
- Enemies, a Love Story (film), 1989 adaptation by Paul Mazursky, starring Anjelica Huston and Ron Silver
- Enemies (1974), a television-film adaptation directed by Kirk Browning and Ellis Rabb of the play of the same name by Maxim Gorky, starring Ellis Rabb
- Enemies (2025 film), a thriller drama film
- Enemies (upcoming film), an upcoming crime film

== Music ==
- Enemies (band), a post-rock band from Ireland
- The Enemies EP (2004), a 2004 EP by the Headlights
- "Enemies" (Ryan Cabrera song)
- "Enemies" (Shinedown song)
- "Enemies", a song by In Case Of Fire from Align the Planets
- "Enemies", a song by M.I from The Chairman
- “Enemies”, a song by Lauv from I Met You When I Was 18 (The Playlist)
- "Enemies" (Post Malone song)

== Television ==
- "Enemies", a 2021 episode of Biohackers
- "Enemies" (Buffy the Vampire Slayer), a 1999 episode
- "Enemies", a 1974 episode of Great Performances
- "Enemies", a 1996 episode of Married... with Children
- "Enemies" (Stargate SG-1), a 2001 episode
- "Enemies", a 2019 episode of Sherman's Showcase
- "Enemies", a 2020 episode of Tales from the Loop
- "Enemies", a 1990 episode of The Bill
- "Enemies" (The West Wing), a 1999 episode
- "The Enemies", part three of Doctor Who Greatest Moments, a 2009 clip show series related to Doctor Who
- "The Enemies", a 1974 episode of Medical Center
- "The Enemies", a 1968 episode of The F.B.I.
- "The Enemies", a 1965 episode of Voyage to the Bottom of the Sea
- "The Enemies", a 2014 episode of Wander Over Yonder

== Other ==
- Enemies (Champions), a 1981 supplement for the role-playing game Champions
