= United States entity =

A business entity or other entity may be designated a United States entity (or US entity) by the US government according to various definitions depending on the domain. Such areas include military strategy, intelligence strategy, geopolitics, international trade, and diplomatic relations. The primary connotation involves defense industry regulations. Defense articles and intellectual property related to the US national interest are tightly controlled.

== Defense and civilian trade regulation ==
For the purposes of International Traffic in Arms Regulations (ITAR) and Export Administration Regulations (EAR), a United States entity is so defined:

... a U.S. entity is a firm incorporated in the United States (or an unincorporated U.S. firm with its principal place of business in the United States) that is controlled by U.S. citizens or by another U.S. entity. An entity is not a U.S. entity if 50 percent plus one share of its stock (if a corporation, or a similar ownership interest of an unincorporated entity) is controlled, directly or indirectly, by non-U.S. citizens or non-U.S. entities.

== See also ==
- United States person
