= Enemy Mine =

Enemy Mine may refer to:

- Enemy Mine (novella), a 1979 science fiction novella by Barry B. Longyear
- Enemy Mine (film), a 1985 film based on the novella
- "Enemy Mine" (Stargate SG-1), a 2003 episode of the sci-fi TV series Stargate SG-1
- Enemy Mine (album), a 2009 album by indie rock band Swan Lake

== See also ==
- My Enemy (disambiguation)
