= Breakdown: How America's Intelligence Failures Led to September 11 =

2003 book by Bill Gertz

- Author: Bill Gertz
- Language: English
- Subject: United States Politics; Terrorism
- Genre: non-fiction
- Publisher: Plume
- Publication date: 27 May 2003
- Publication place: United States
- Pages: 320
- ISBN: 0-452-28427-9
- OCLC: 54081932
- Dewey Decimal: 327.1273/009/045 21
- LC Class: UB251.U6 G47 2003

Breakdown (ISBN 0-452-28427-9) is a 2003 book by Bill Gertz arguing that U.S. intelligence services "lost sight of [their] purpose and function" due to Clinton administration policies that were more concerned with political correctness than with national defense.

Publishers Weekly gave it a mixed review, calling it "an unbalanced but revealing expose on the mistakes, misdirections and blunders behind 'the most damaging intelligence failure since Pearl Harbor.'"

Sam Roberts writing in The New York Times credits Gertz with convincingly arguing that there was a failure within the American intelligence community, although "his well-argued case is occasionally freighted by his own predispositions."
