= Diamond in the Firepit =

Studio album by Brother Firetribe
- Released: 2 May 2014
- Genre: AOR
- Label: Spinefarm Records
- Producer: Tomppa Nikulainen; Emppu Vuorinen

Diamond in the Firepit is the third studio album by the Finnish band Brother Firetribe, released in 2014. It's the band's first album after six years. A digital single, For Better or For Worse, was released as an advance copy. The album ranked #7 on the Finnish album chart in its first week.

== Track list ==
1. Intro – 00:21
2. Love Is Not Enough – 03:55
3. Far Away from Love – 04:14
4. For Better or for Worse – 04:10
5. Desperately – 04:17
6. Edge of Forever – 03:57
7. Hanging By a Thread – 05:15
8. Trail of Tears – 04:11
9. Winner Takes It All – 03:56 (cover of Sammy Hagar's song- soundtrack for the movie Over The Top – Giorgio Moroder, Tom Whitlock)
10. Tired of Dreaming – 04:27
11. Reality Bites – 03:56
12. Close To the Bone – 04:11

== Lineup ==
- Pekka Heino – vocals
- Emppu Vuorinen – guitar
- Tomppa Nikulainen – keyboard
- Jason Flinck – bass, backing vocals
- Kalle Torniainen – drums
