= The Enemy of My Enemy (novel) =

- First edition
- Author: W.E.B. Griffin and William E. Butterworth IV
- Language: English
- Series: Clandestine Operations Series
- Genre: Spy novel
- Publisher: G. P. Putnam's Sons
- Publication date: December 21, 2018
- Publication place: United States
- Media type: Print (hardcover)
- Pages: 400 pp (first edition, hardcover)
- ISBN: 978-0735213067
- Preceded by: Death at Nuremberg (2017)

The Enemy of My Enemy is the fifth novel in the Clandestine Operations Series by W.E.B. Griffin and William E. Butterworth IV.

== Plot ==
This novel centers around Capt. James Cronley, the central character of all the novels of the series. Cronley, who captured two notorious Nazi war criminals in Austria in Death at Nuremberg, the previous novel in this series, is charged with recapturing them. They have escaped captivity at Nuremberg. Cronley and his associates find in this novel that there is more involved than recapturing the two men. In the last stages of World War II, as is the premise of this novel, Heinrich Himmler had stashed away much money and gold to establish a Fourth Reich. Cronley finds he is having a difficult time determining who amongst international players he can trust and he escapes an assassination plot that leaves him wondering whether 'the enemy of my enemy' can be trusted as his friend in his quest to find the two Nazis and the treasure Himmler had stashed away.

== Reviews ==
Judy Gigstad reviewed this novel for Bookreporter and she wrote a positive review, saying, " Fans can only anticipate the next Griffin/Butterworth collaboration."Publishers Weekly showed less enthusiasm for the series. A review from it said it liked this book more than it liked other books in the series, "Newcomers will find this a good entry point, and regular readers will be pleased that the authors have avoided the long-winded prose that’s marred recent entries in the series."
