= Wisdom (Altaria album) =

Studio album by Altaria
- Released: 8 July 2022
- Genre: Power metal; hard rock
- Length: 47:51
- Label: Reaper Entertainment

Altaria chronology
| Unholy (2009) | Wisdom (2022) |

Professional ratings
Review scores
| Source | Rating |
|---|---|
| Dead Rhetoric | 7.5/10 |
| Metal Temple | 8/10 |
| Metal.de | 8/10 |

Wisdom is the fifth studio album by Finnish power metal band Altaria, released on 8 July 2022. It is their first album since their hiatus, final concert, and temporary split throughout the 2010s, also marking the return of bassist Marko Pukkila and vocalist Taage Laiho.

== Track listing ==
1. "Wisdom" – 3:35
2. "Diablo Rojo" – 5:12
3. "Without Warning" – 3:18
4. "Kissed by the Flames" – 4:54
5. "Power to Heal" – 3:43
6. "Sometimes" – 4:45
7. "Victory of Winter" – 4:31
8. "History of Times to Come (2022)" – 4:51
9. "Lost in Time" – 4:26
10. "Crimson Rain" – 8:36
11. "Kingdom of the Night (2022)" (Japanese edition bonus track) – 3:14

== Personnel ==
=== Altaria ===
- Taage Laiho – vocals
- Juha Pekka Alanen – guitars
- Petri Aho – guitars
- Marko Pukkila – bass
- Tony Smedjebacka – drums

=== Production ===
- Harley Velasquez – artwork, layout
