= Pekka Heino (singer) =

Finnish singer (born 1976)

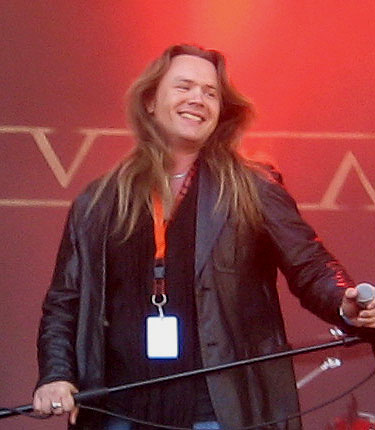

Background information
- Birth name: Pekka Ansio Heino
- Born: 6 January 1976 (age 49) Helsinki, Finland
- Origin: Kerava, Finland
- Genres: Melodic metal, AOR
- Occupation(s): Musician, singer
- Instrument(s): vocals, guitar
- Years active: 1997–present
- Website: Brother Firetribe; Leverage

Pekka Ansio Heino (born 6 January 1976) is a Finnish singer. He is currently the lead vocalist in AOR band Brother Firetribe. Prior to this, he played in melodic metal band Leverage and a Finnish rock band called Cashmir, last one with fellow Brother Firetribe member Tomppa Nikulainen.

== Discography ==
=== Leverage ===
- Tides (2006)
- Follow Down That River (EP) (2007)
- Blind Fire (2008)
- Circus Colossus (2009)

=== Brother Firetribe ===
- False Metal (2006) [Later re-released as Break Out]
- "One Single Breath" (single)
- "I'm on Fire" (single)
- "I am Rock" (single)
- "Runaways" (single)
- Heart Full of Fire (2008)
- Heart Full of Fire... And Then Some (EP)
- Live at Apollo (2010)
- For Better or For Worse (2014) (single)
- Diamond in the Firepit (2014)
- Sunbound (2017)

=== Cashmir ===
- Cashmir (1997)
