= The Enemy (English punk band) =

- Origin: Derby, England
- Genres: Punk rock
- Years active: 1980–1984, 2012–present
- Members: Mark Woodhouse; Steve "Mez" Mellors; Steve O'Donnell; Mark Herrington; Kev Lamb; Wayne Griffiths

The Enemy are a punk rock band from Derby, England, who formed in 1980, releasing two albums.

== History ==
The Enemy formed in early 1980 in their local youth club, with several changes of personnel before they stabilized the following year as Mark Woodhouse (vocals), Steve "Mez" Mellors (guitar), Steve O'Donnell (bass), and Mark Herrington (drums). They played their first gig at Woodlands Youth Centre, and landed a support slot on Anti Pasti's gig in Huddersfield. They recorded their first single, "50,000 Dead" at Old Cottage Studios in Derby, releasing it on their own Tin Tin label. The single was quite successful and led to the band being signed to Fall Out Records, debuting on the label with "Fallen Hero" in May 1982, which reached number 44 in the UK Indie Chart. "Fallen Hero", an anti-war song, was also included on the Punk and Disorderly volume 2 compilation which reached the indie top 10. The band's third single was less successful, and Mellor was replaced by Kevin Lamb of local punk band Total Loss, who livened up the band's live performances.

Debut album Gateway to Hell was issued in 1983 to much critical acclaim and respectable sales. Herrington left the band before the album was released, to be replaced by Dave Hill. The band toured around Britain in support of the album, but were dropped by Fall Out, and moved to the local Rot label (run by Riot Squad's Dunk) for their next single, "Last But Not Least", which was followed by an album of the same name (now featuring a fifth member, lead guitarist Russell Maw), with tracks split between a live recording from The Bierkeller in Leeds and studio tracks recorded at Cargo Studios in Rochdale. The album turned out to be The Enemy's final release, with disappointing sales following the lack of support and funding from Rot together with musical differences prompted the band to call it a day in 1984.

Drummer Dave Hill is still involved in music, having worked with Apes, Pigs & Spacemen, Neil Finn, and Johnny Marr, and as a member of Arnold.

The band reformed in 2011, including original drummer Mark Herrington, playing a home town show in Derby on 30 June 2012 and at the 2012 Rebellion Punk Festival.

== Discography ==
=== Singles ===
- "50,000 Dead" (1981) Tin Tin
- "Fallen Hero" (1982) Fall Out (UK Indie No. 44)
- "Punk's Alive" (1982) Fall Out
- "Last Rites" (1982) Fall Out (UK Indie No. 31)
- "Last But Not Least" (1983) Rot

=== Albums ===
- Gateway to Hell (1983) Fall Out, reissued in expanded CD form on Captain Oi! in 1995
- Last But Not Least (1984) Rot
