= Emppu Vuorinen =

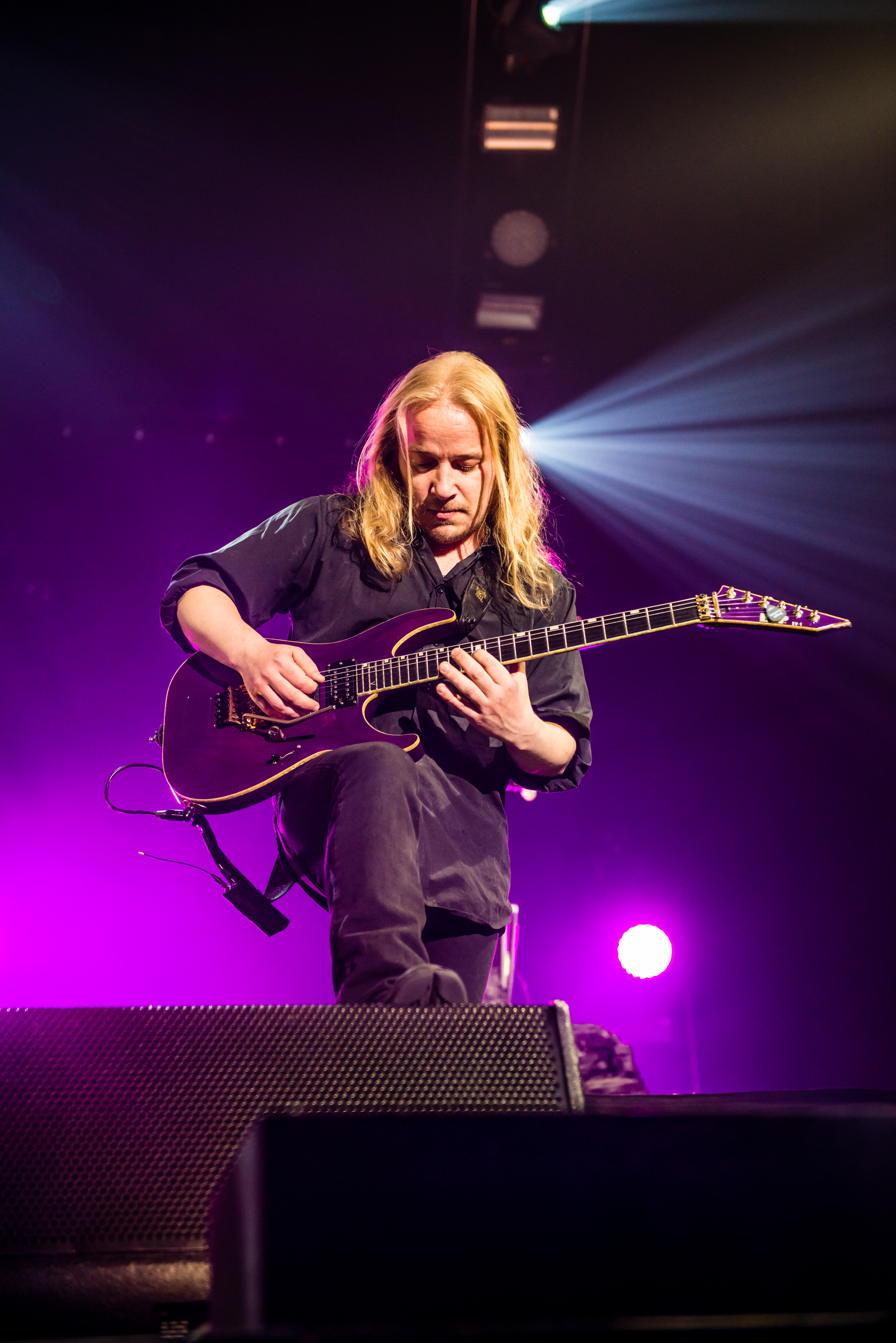
- Vuorinen performing in 2015

Background information
- Born: Erno Matti Juhani Vuorinen; 24 June 1978 (age 47)
- Origin: Kitee, Finland
- Genres: Symphonic metal, power metal, black metal, AOR
- Occupations: Musician, songwriter
- Instrument: Guitar
- Years active: 1996–present
- Member of: Nightwish
- Formerly of: Brother Firetribe; Altaria; Almah

Erno Matti Juhani "Emppu" Vuorinen (born 24 June 1978) is a Finnish guitarist, most famous for being a founding member and occasional songwriter of the symphonic metal band Nightwish. He is the oldest of five children, having a twin brother and three younger sisters. He started to play guitar as a private study at the age of 12 and since then has played in various bands including Nightwish, Brother Firetribe, Barilari, Almah, and Altaria.

== Biography ==
Vuorinen started playing guitar as a hobby at the age of ten. Vuorinen knew Jukka Nevalainen from elementary school and met Tuomas Holopainen at a gig by Nattvindens Gråt. As Holopainen started Nightwish he asked Vuorinen to join the new band. The new band, called Nightwish, started as an acoustic music project and they asked Tarja Turunen to join initially for three songs.

Vuorinen has a black belt in judo and has won a bronze-medal from Nordic championship of the youth and two gold-medals from Finnish championship of the youth.

Vuorinen has a recording studio at Kerava with Tero Kinnunen. Vuorinen and Marko Hietala received cultural award from Kerava for their contributions.

== Background ==
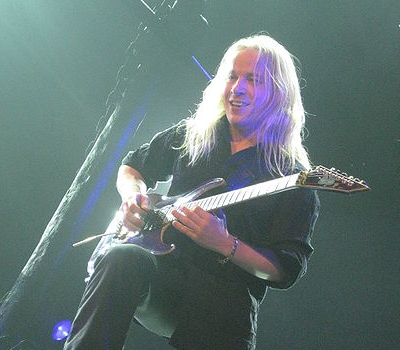
Vuorinen in 2009

Vuorinen and Nevalainen played together in bands Ambrosia and Nidhro't before Nightwish.

Vuorinen and Holopainen founded Nightwish in 1996 with Tarja Turunen. Vuorinen also formed Brother Firetribe as a side project in 2002 after moving to Kerava. Vuorinen has produced and recorded Brother Firetribe albums with band member Tomppa Nikulainen. In 2004 Vuorinen left Altaria.

In Nightwish, Vuorinen is primarily a rhythm player, often supporting the keyboard or orchestral parts of Nightwish songs. However, he plays lead melodies and solos as well. Vuorinen's solo techniques usually include alternate picking, tapping, sliding, legato, and minor to extreme whammy bar use; he also employs sweep picking, although very rarely. His solos are more melodic than those of most metal bands, but he sometimes shreds (notably in "Nightquest," "The Pharaoh Sails to Orion," "Romanticide," and "Gethsemane" by Nightwish, and also in "Traitor" by Tarot, for which he provided a solo). Nightwish's first three albums feature a larger amount of lead guitar work from Vuorinen than their later albums.

Vuorinen is also a creative force in Nightwish, having co-written songs with Tuomas Holopainen from Oceanborn until Dark Passion Play. The song "Whoever Brings The Night" on Dark Passion Play is written by Vuorinen alone.

Vuorinen has said that when he was younger there was more of a need to show skills which has since diminished and since then he plays more as the song requires, also leaving more of the songwriting responsibilities to Holopainen. Vuorinen does not play excessive notes and keeps to the atmosphere of the songs.

Vuorinen recorded guitar parts for Almah, a Brazilian metal band, order to help his friend and vocalist Edu Falaschi (former singer of Angra). Vuorinen did not stay in the band because of his obligations to Nightwish. He was also involved with Brother Firetribe, an AOR band, and played on four albums released worldwide: False Metal (re-released as Break Out), Heart Full of Fire, Diamond in the Firepit and Sunbound.

In 2020 Vuorinen left Brother Firetribe due to lack of time.

== Discography ==
=== Brother Firetribe ===
Studio albums:

- False Metal (2006)
- Heart Full of Fire (2008)
- Diamond in the Firepit (2014)
- Sunbound (2017)

=== Altaria ===
Studio albums:

- Invitation (2003)

=== Almah ===
Studio albums:

- Almah (2006)

=== Darkwoods My Betrothed ===
Studio albums:

- Witch-Hunts (1998)
