= El Enemigo (1979 TV series) =

- Created by: Caridad Bravo Adams
- Directed by: Ernesto Alonso
- Starring: Daniela Romo; Lorena Velázquez; Jorge Vargas
- Country of origin: Mexico
- Original language: Spanish
- No. of episodes: 20

Production
- Executive producer: Ernesto Alonso
- Cinematography: Karlos Velázquez

Original release
- Network: Canal de las Estrellas
- Release: July 3, 1979 – 1979

Related
- El Enemigo (1961); María Mercedes (1992)

El Enemigo (English The Enemy) is a telenovela made by Mexican TV network Televisa, directed and produced by Ernesto Alonso. It was broadcast in 1979, on weekends only. It was a remake of the 1961 telenovela of the same name.

== Cast ==
- Daniela Romo
- Jorge Vargas
- Lorena Velázquez
- Alfonzo Meza
- Freddy Fernández
- Oscar Servín
- José Baviera
- Guillermo Zarur
- Alicia Montoya
