= El Enemigo (1961 TV series) =

- Genre: Telenovela; Drama
- Created by: Caridad Bravo Adams
- Starring: Luz María Aguilar; Augusto Benedico; Anita Blanch; Manuel Calvo
- Country of origin: Mexico
- Original language: Spanish

Production
- Executive producer: Ernesto Alonso
- Running time: 30 minutes

Original release
- Network: Telesistema Mexicano
- Release: 1961 – 1961

Related
- Elena; Estafa de amor; El Enemigo (1979) Desencuentro (1997)

El Enemigo (English:The Enemy) is a Mexican telenovela produced by Ernesto Alonso and transmitted by Telesistema Mexicano.

Luz María Aguilar and Augusto Benedico starred as protagonists.

== Cast ==
- Luz María Aguilar
- Augusto Benedico
- Anita Blanch
- Manuel Calvo
- Kippy Casado
- Mari Carmen González
- Rafael Banquells
- Armando Arriola
- Mario García González
- Pastora Peña

== See also ==
- El Enemigo (1979 telenovela), a remake
