= Chi Mak =

Chinese-born American citizen (1940–2022)

Chi Mak (traditional Chinese: 麥大志; simplified Chinese: 麦大志; Jyutping: mak6 daai6 zi3; pinyin: Mài Dàzhì; 28 September 1940 – 31 October 2022) was a Chinese-born American citizen who worked as an engineer for California-based defense contractor Power Paragon, a part of L-3 Communications. He was convicted of espionage for China.

== Biography ==
=== Early life ===
Mak lived in Hong Kong before, in the late 1970s, moving to the U.S. as an immigrant.

=== Espionage case ===
In 2007, Mak was found guilty of conspiring to export sensitive defense technology to China. He was not formally charged with espionage as the information was not officially classified.

Mak's legal defense was that he thought there was nothing improper about leaving the U.S. with a CD carrying his own published work on U.S. defense technology, despite his training from his employer indicating quite the opposite. He had intentionally released it without his employer's permission at a 2004 international engineering conference. He had been briefed every year on regulations regarding documents designated "For Official Use Only" (FOUO) and items restricted by export controls. His defense argued that making the data accessible to scrutiny by the general public negated its military value and made it acceptable to transport outside the United States, despite the fact that Chi Mak was the one who released the information, without authorization. The defense also argued that the data was in the public domain. The information Mak passed on allegedly helped China build its own version of Aegis, an American radar system built to protect military ships.

The prosecution indicated that the data was nevertheless export-controlled and that it should not have been shared with foreign nationals without authorization. The IEEE presentations cited by prosecution in the trial are currently available on a worldwide basis, due to Chi Mak's unauthorized releases.

Mak's brother and sister-in-law were apprehended by the FBI after boarding a flight to Hong Kong carrying one encrypted CD which contained defense-related documents. They, along with their son as well as Mak's wife, all pleaded guilty to related charges. They served out their sentence and were deported to Mainland China.

On March 24, 2008, Chi Mak was sentenced to 24 years and 4 months in federal prison.

=== Death ===
Chi Mak died in prison on October 31, 2022, at the age of 82.

== See also ==
- Chinese intelligence operations in the United States
- Economic Espionage Act of 1996
