= Estudios Churubusco =

Movie studio in Mexico City

Coordinates: 19.35551°N 99.14284°W

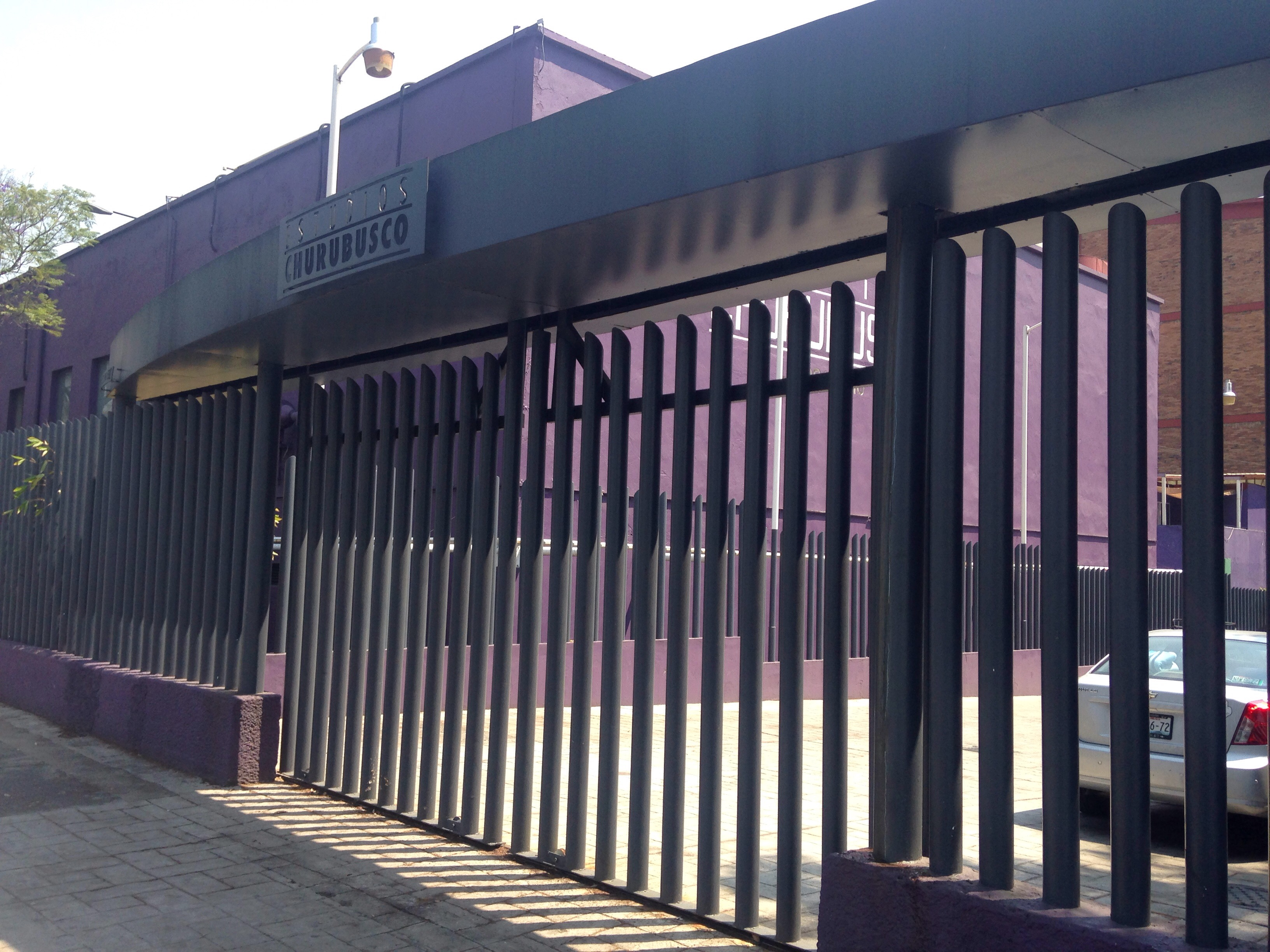
- Company type: Government
- Industry: Motion pictures
- Founded: 1945; 81 years ago
- Headquarters: Calle Atletas 2, Country Club Churubusco, 04220 Ciudad de México, CDMX, Mexico, Churubusco, Mexico City, Mexico

Estudios Churubusco is one of the oldest and largest movie studios in Mexico. It is located in the Churubusco neighborhood of Mexico City.

== History ==
It was inaugurated in 1945 following a 1943 agreement between RKO Pictures and Emilio Azcárraga Vidaurreta. In 1950, it was acquired by the federal government of Mexico and merged with Estudios y Laboratorios Azteca to form Estudios Churubusco. Since 1958, it has been controlled by the Mexican government. Of the four motion picture studios active during the golden age of Mexican cinema — the others being Estudios América, Televisa San Ángel, and Estudios Tepeyac — it and Televisa San Ángel remain in operation.

It is estimated that 95% of films produced in Mexico since 2000 have used one or more of the studio's services. Films shot at Estudios Churubusco include the James Bond film Licence to Kill (1988), Honey, I Shrunk the Kids (1989), Total Recall (1990), Amores perros (2000), which was nominated for the Academy Award for Best Foreign Language Film, and Frida (2002).

In 2017, Estudios Churubusco celebrated its 72nd anniversary by opening its facilities to the public for the first time, allowing visitors to learn more about the studio and its film achievements.

== Selected films ==
| Year filmed | Film | Director | Note |
|---|---|---|---|
| 1945 | La morena de mi copla | Fernando A. Rivero | |
| 1945 | La perla | Emilio Fernández | With Pedro Armendáriz |
| 1945 | Pervertida | José Díaz Morales | |
| 1946 | El ahijado de la muerte | Norman Foster | |
| 1946 | The Fugitive | John Ford | With Henry Fonda & Dolores del Río |
| 1946 | Hay muertos que no hacen ruido | Humberto Gómez Landero | |
| 1946 | La insaciable | Juan José Ortega | |
| 1946 | La mujer de todos | Julio Bracho | |
| 1946 | No te cases con mi mujer | Fernando Cortés | |
| 1946 | La otra | Roberto Gavaldón | |
| 1946 | Si me han de matar mañana | Miguel Zacarías | |
| 1947 | Fly Away, Young Man! | Miguel M. Delgado | |
| 1947 | Adventures of Casanova | Roberto Gavaldon | |
| 1947 | La diosa arrodillada | Roberto Gavaldon | |
| 1947 | Mystery in Mexico | Robert Wise | |
| 1948 | Allá en el rancho grande | Fernando de Fuentes | |
| 1948 | Maclovia | Emilio Fernández | |
| 1948 | Tarzan and the Mermaids | Robert Florey | |
| 1948 | Si Adelita se fuera con otro | Chano Urueta | |
| 1949 | Puerta….joven | Miguel M. Delgado | With Cantinflas |
| 1950 | El bombero atómico | Miguel M. Delgado | |
| 1950 | Doña perfecta | Alejandro Galindo | With Dolores del Río |
| 1951 | Baile, mi rey | Roberto Rodríguez | |
| 1951 | El derecho de nacer | Zacarías Gómez Urquiza | |
| 1951 | Mama nos quita los novios | Roberto Rodríguez | |
| 1951 | Mátenme porque me muero | Ismael Rodríguez | |
| 1951 | Que te ha dado esa mujer | Ismael Rodríguez | |
| 1951 | A.T.M. ¡A toda máquina! | Ismael Rodriguez | |
| 1952 | El bello durmiente | Gilberto Martínez Solares | |
| 1952 | Dos tipos de cuidado | Ismael Rodríguez | |
| 1952 | Pepe el Toro | Ismael Rodríguez | With Pedro Infante |
| 1952 | Por ellas aunque mal paguen | Juan Bustillo Oro | |
| 1953 | Las cariñosas | Fernando Cortés | |
| 1956 | Corazón salvaje | Juan José Ortega | |
| 1956 | A Woman's Devotion | Paul Henreid | |
| 1956 | El bolero de Raquel | Miguel M. Delgado | With Cantinflas |
| 1956 | The Brave One | Irving Harper | |
| 1956 | Cielito lindo | Miguel M. Delgado | |
| 1958 | Ay... Calypso no te rajes! | Jaime Salvador | |
| 1960 | Amorcito corazón | Rogelio A. González | |
| 1960 | El analfabeto | Miguel M. Delgado | |
| 1962 | El ángel exterminador | Luis Buñuel | |
| 1967 | El agente 00-sexy | Fernando Cortés | |
| 1968 | Corazón salvaje | Tito Davison | |
| 1968 | Butch Cassidy and the Sundance Kid | George Roy Hill | With Paul Newman & Robert Redford |
| 1968 | Cuando los hijos se van | Julián Soler | |
| 1968 | Robinson Crusoe | René Cardona Jr. | |
| 1969 | Soldier Blue | Ralph Nelson | |
| 1971 | The Assassination of Trotsky | Joseph Losey | |
| 1971 | Big Jake | George Sherman | |
| 1971 | Boulevard Du Rhum | Robert Enrico | |
| 1971 | Buck and the Preacher | Sidney Poitier | |
| 1972 | El castillo de la pureza | Arturo Ripstein | |
| 1972 | Slaughter | Jack Starrett | |
| 1973 | Shootout in a One-Dog Town | Burt Kennedy | |
| 1973 | Bring Me the Head of Alfredo Garcia | Sam Peckinpah | |
| 1973 | Calzonzin inspector | Alfonso Arau | |
| 1974 | Antonio and the Mayor | Jerry Thorpe | |
| 1974 | Bellas de noche | Miguel M. Delgado | |
| 1975 | El apando | Felipe Cazals | |
| 1975 | The Devil's Rain | Robert Fuest | |
| 1977 | Bloody Marlene | Alberto Mariscal | |
| 1978 | Las cariñosas | Rafael Portillo | |
| 1978 | The Eagle's Wing | Anthony Harvey | |
| 1979 | Cacciatore di squali | Enzo G. Castellari | |
| 1979 | Le Scarabee d’Or | Maurice Ronet | |
| 1980 | Campeche: Un estado de ánimo | Luis Mandoki | |
| 1981 | El barrendero | Miguel M. Delgado | With Cantinflas |
| 1981 | Caveman | Carl Gottlieb | |
| 1981 | Chanfle II | Chespirito | |
| 1981 | La Chevre | Francis Veber | |
| 1982 | Amityville II: The Possession | Damiano Damiani | |
| 1982 | Sorceress | Jack Hill | |
| 1982 | The Honorary Consul | John Mackenzie | |
| 1983 | Under the Volcano | John Huston | |
| 1983 | Choices of the Heart | Joseph Sargent | |
| 1984 | Romancing the Stone | Robert Zemeckis | With Michael Douglas & Kathleen Turner |
| 1984 | Conan the Destroyer | Richard Fleischer | With Arnold Schwarzenegger |
| 1984 | Dune | David Lynch | |
| 1985 | Rambo: First Blood Part II | Georges P. Cosmatos | With Sylvester Stallone |
| 1986 | Chiquita pero picosa | Juan Pastor | With Verónica Castro |
| 1988 | Licence to Kill | John Glen | 16th James Bond film |
| 1989 | Total Recall | Paul Verhoeven | with Arnold Schwarzenegger |
| 1989 | Honey, I Shrunk the Kids | Joe Johnston | with Rick Moranis |
| 1989 | La tarea | Jaime Humberto Hermosillo | |
| 1990 | Cabeza de Vaca | Nicolás Echevarría | |
| 1990 | Ciudad de ciegos | Alberto Cortes | |
| 1990 | Danzón | María Novaro | |
| 1990 | La mujer de benjamín | Carlos Carrera | |
| 1990 | Sólo con tu pareja | Alfonso Cuarón | |
| 1991 | El Bulto | Gabriel Retes | |
| 1991 | Como agua para chocolate | Alfonso Arau | |
| 1991 | La invención de Cronos | Guillermo del Toro | |
| 1991 | Miroslava | Alejandro Pelayo | |
| 1991 | Modelo antiguo | Raúl Araiza | With Silvia Pinal |
| 1992 | Break of Dawn | Isaac Artenstein | |
| 1993 | Bienvenido /welcome | Gabriel Retes | |
| 1993 | Hasta morir | Fernando Saldaña | |
| 1995 | Avalon | Lorenzo Hagerman | |
| 1995 | Cilantro y perejil | Rafael Montero | |
| 1995 | De tripas corazón | Antonio Urrutia | |
| 1996 | 100 años de cine mexicano | Carlos Carrera | |
| 1996 | Romeo + Juliet | Baz Luhrmann | With Leonardo DiCaprio |
| 1996 | Santitos | Alejandro Springall | |
| 1997 | De noche vienes, Esmeralda | Jaime Humberto Hermosillo | |
| 1998 | Bajo California, el limite del tiempo | Carlos Bolado | |
| 1998 | Sexo, pudor y lágrimas | Antonio Serrano | Box-office record |
| 1998 | The Mask of Zorro | Martin Campbell | With Antonio Banderas |
| 1999 | Amores perros | Alejandro González Iñárritu | Best Foreign Film Oscar nomination |
| 1999 | El coronel no tiene quien le escriba | Arturo Ripstein | |
| 1999 | Crónica de un desayuno | Benjamín Cann | |
| 1999 | La ley de Herodes | Luis Estrada | |
| 1999 | Todo el poder | Fernando Sariñana | |
| 2000 | Atlético San Pancho | Gustavo Loza | |
| 2000 | De la calle | Gerardo Tort | |
| 2000 | Demasiado amor | Ernesto Rimoch | |
| 2000 | Fidel | David Atwood | |
| 2000 | Japón | Carlos Reygadas | |
| 2000 | Perfume de violetas | Maryse Sistach | |
| 2000 | Original Sin | Michael Cristofer | With Antonio Banderas & Angelina Jolie |
| 2001 | Asesino en serio | Antonio Urrutia | |
| 2001 | Frida | Julie Taymor | With Salma Hayek |
| 2001 | La habitación azul | Walter Doehner | |
| 2001 | El tigre de Santa Julia | Alejandro Gamboa | |
| 2001 | Un secreto de Esperanza | Leopoldo Laborde | |
| 2001 | Sin ton ni Sonia | Carlos Sama | |
| 2001 | Vivir mata | Nicolás Echevarría | |
| 2002 | Amar te duele | Fernando Sariñana | |
| 2002 | El crimen del Padre Amaro | Carlos Carrera | Best Foreign Film Oscar nomination |
| 2002 | La hija del caníbal | Antonio Serrano | |
| 2003 | Ladies Night | Gabriela Tagliavini | |
| 2003 | Nicotina | Hugo Rodríguez | With Diego Luna |
| 2003 | Sobreviviente | Paul Michael | |
| 2004 | The Matador | Richard Shepard | With Pierce Brosnan |
| 2004 | The Librarian: Quest for the Spear | | With Noah Wyle |
| 2004 | Bandidas | Joachim Rønning & Espen Sandberg | With Salma Hayek and Penélope Cruz |
| 2004 | Man on Fire | Tony Scott | With Denzel Washington |
| 2006 | Resident Evil: Extinction | Russell Mulcahy | With Milla Jovovich |
| 2022 | Bardo, False Chronicle of a Handful of Truths | Alejandro González Iñárritu | With Daniel Gimenez Cacho |
