= Un Quijote sin mancha =

- Directed by: Miguel M. Delgado
- Written by: Cantinflas; Jaime Salvador; Carlos León (additional dialogue)
- Produced by: Jacques Gelman
- Starring: Cantinflas; Lupita Ferrer; Susana Salvat; Ángel Garasa
- Cinematography: Rosalío Solano
- Edited by: Gloria Schoemann
- Music by: Sergio Guerrero
- Production company: Posa Films Internacional
- Distributed by: Columbia Pictures
- Release date: 17 September 1969 (Mexico)
- Running time: 100 minutes
- Country: Mexico
- Language: Spanish

Un Quijote sin mancha (aka A Quixote Without La Mancha) is a 1969 Mexican comedy film directed by Miguel M. Delgado and starring Cantinflas, Lupita Ferrer, Susana Salvat and Ángel Garasa. This film marked the film debut of Jacqueline Voltaire, in uncredited roles. The title is a pun on the title of the novel Don Quixote of La Mancha.

== Plot ==
Justo Leal y Aventado is a law intern who receives classes from an old retired lawyer, Professor Ramón Arvide, who says Justo reminds him of Don Quijote, citing his purity and desire to help the poor.

Justo works as a law intern in the prestigious law firm of the Manceras, lawyers whose clientele is usually the elite. Just does not like the job, although he is friends with the secretary, Angélica. Justo asks for an increase in his salary, but he is never granted it. This, combined with having to serve corrupt clients, leads Justo to resign and devote himself to the defense of poor clients.

During the course of the film, Justo defends a series of clients. He releases Cirilo Pingarrón, a young man who is accused of stealing a television from the store where he works, from prison. Although Cirilo is actually guilty of the theft, Justo argues that he intended to return it the next day. Justo also calls attention to the fact that the store owner (a Spaniard whose accent is almost incomprehensible) pays Isidro only forty pesos a week, which he argues is far from being what establishes the law.

In another case, Justo also helps Sara Buenrostro, a young widow who risks losing her daughter due to her work as a cabaret dancer. He points out the hypocrisy of the accusers, indicating that the accusing lawyer (one of the Manceras with whom Justo had previously worked) has been seen sunbathing with a colleague's secretary. The shame, combined with the fact that Justo had gotten Mrs. Buenrostro another job as a telephone operator, causes the demand to be withdrawn, and the young mother keeps her daughter.

The neighborhood in which Justo lives, meanwhile, is under threat of the owner throwing out the tenants in order to raise rents. Justo takes their defense, and in a meeting called with the owner, Justo (taking advantage that he had bought a phone that had not yet been connected) pretends to have a telephone conversation with the undersecretary of Health, including making the owner believe of a new law that would punish the lack of maintenance of homes with jail. Feeling threatened by the new law, and following the advice of Justo, the businessman not only decides not to throw out the tenants, but to make several fix-ups in the houses.

The same judge who presided over the case of Mrs. Buenrostro asks Justo to go find his son, who has left the home to devote himself to the hippie lifestyle. Justo dresses as a hippie to enter a club frequented by hippies where he finds the young man, and while trying to convince him to return home, the club is raided by the police and they take everyone to jail, including Justo, whom they see as another of the hippies. Justo berates the young people in jail, criticizing their lack of love for work, telling them "you want to be free, yet you are becoming slaves of your own vices." Professor Arvide hears the news that Justo has been taken to jail, and runs to the police station to take him out, but leaves in such a hurry that he forgets to change his clothes and arrives dressed in pajamas, so the police mistake him for another hippie and put him in jail with Justo. After spending the night in jail, Justo, the professor, and the judge's son are released. The young man, repentant, promises Justo that his hippie days are over and returns home.

The neighbors celebrate the salvation of the neighborhood (and Justo's birthday) with a party. He is just about to declare his love for Angélica, when she announces that she and the businessman's son are engaged. During the party, Professor Arvide, while dancing with Angélica, suffers an attack; Justo accompanies him to his apartment, where the professor, after giving some final advice to Justo, dies.

In the last scene, a few days after the professor's death, many of the characters Justo has been able to help come to his home/office to thank him for his service. The film ends with Justo walking through the streets of Mexico City.

== Cast ==
- Mario Moreno «Cantinflas» as Justo Leal y Aventado
- Ángel Garasa as Professor Ramón Arvide
- Lupita Ferrer as Angélica
- Susana Salvat as Sara Buenrostro
- Carlos Fernández as Lic. Alberto Borrego
- Eduardo Alcaraz as Lawyer at Delegation
- Luis Manuel Pelayo as Cirilo's Boss
- Carlos Riquelme as Judge
- Víctor Alcocer as Sr. Borrego
- Angelines Fernández as Prudencia Pingarrón
- Carlota Solares as Isabel Gavilán
- Carlos Agostí as Gerardo Palomo
- Roberto Meyer as Sr. Malpica
- Agustín Isunza as Grandfather Mancera
- Queta Carrasco as Doña Angustias
- León Barroso as Lic. Tomás Mancera
- Consuelo Monteagudo as Doña Candelaria
- Rodolfo Roca
- César Castro as Son of Judge
- Victorio Blanco as Elderly Man in Elevator (uncredited)
- Nora Cantú as Sara's Dancer Friend (uncredited)
- Abel Cureño as Vecino (uncredited)
- Felipe de Flores as Vecino (uncredited)
- Sadi Dupeyrón as Cirilo (uncredited)
- Pedro Elviro as Secretary in Delegation (uncredited)
- Evelia Esquivel as Sra. Malpica (uncredited)
- Rosa Furman as President of the Moral Council (uncredited)
- Pepita González as President's Friend (uncredited)
- Armando Gutiérrez as Chief of Police (uncredited)
- Leonor Gómez as Neighbor (uncredited)
- Benny Ibarra as Singer of Nightclub Band (uncredited)
- Carlos Vendrell as Policeman (uncredited)
- Jacqueline Voltaire as Dancer at Nightclub (uncredited)
- Eduardo Zamarripa as Neighbor (uncredited)

== Analysis ==
In Cantinflas and the Chaos of Mexican Modernity, Professor Jeffrey M. Pilcher stated that the film was the second time where Cantiflas "denounced the local counterculture" by showing his character "in a nightclub filled with drugged-out beats" (after El señor doctor), stating in regards of the scene where his character berates a group of hippies in jail that "in berating the jipitecas for smoking dope instead of working, Moreno reversed the roles of his early movie, Ahí está el detalle, conceding to them the carefree younthful spirit of Cantinflas while he became the stodgy establishment figure played by Joaquín Pardavé [in Ahí está el detalle]." The film premiered two weeks before the first anniversary of the Tlatelolco massacre, which is not specifically mentioned in the film. Nonetheless, Pilcher argued that Cantinflas's denouncements against the counterculture among the youth were "Mario Moreno [joining in] the attempt to restore the legitimacy of the ruling party [the Institutional Revolutionary Party] by condemning the students as a threat to the nation." Pilcher also cited the film as an example of Cantinflas's career at the time having "reached a terminal decline", describing the courtroom scene as him having "tried to relive the triumphant courtroom scene from Ahí está el detalle; but where in 1940 Cantinflas had subverted the entire courtroom with his fast-talking nonsense, the best he could manage in 1969 was to accuse the prosecutor of vacationing in Acapulco with a bilingual secretary." Pilcher further noted "attempts to restore his youthful complexion", saying, "Most pathetic of all was his desire to have his youthful cake and eat it too by disguising himself in a mop-top wig and wire-rimmed glasses to dance with a go-go girl before lecturing the jipitecas. He appeared, in the end, like an ambivalent old parson, simultaneously seduced by the sins of youth and terrified for his immortal soul. While venting his wrath on middle-class youth, he also lost touch with the changing reality of the urban poor, always his most loyal audience."

== Bibliography ==
- Martínez Soria, Carlos Julián; Millán Martínez, Juan Manuel. Astrana Marín, Cervantes y Shakespeare: paralelismos y convergencias. Ediciones de la Universidad de Castilla La Mancha, 2018.
- Pilcher, Jeffrey M. Cantinflas and the Chaos of Mexican Modernity. Rowman & Littlefield, 2001.
