= El patrullero 777 =

1978 film by Miguel M. Delgado

- Directed by: Miguel M. Delgado
- Written by: Mario Moreno «Cantinflas» Isaac Díaz Araiza; Carlos León
- Produced by: Jacques Gelman
- Starring: Mario Moreno «Cantinflas» Ana Bertha Lepe; Valeria Pani
- Cinematography: Rosalío Solano
- Edited by: Gloria Schoemann
- Music by: Gustavo César Carrión
- Distributed by: Columbia Pictures
- Release date: 27 April 1978 (Mexico)
- Running time: 120 minutes
- Country: Mexico
- Language: Spanish

El patrullero 777 (in English: "The Patrolman 777") is a 1978 Mexican comedy film directed by Miguel M. Delgado and starring Mario Moreno «Cantinflas», Ana Bertha Lepe and Valeria Pani. This film concludes the loose trilogy around the character of Agente 777, who first appeared in The Unknown Policeman (1941) and reappeared in The Atomic Fireman (1952), although the only connection between this three films is that Cantinflas's character is a policeman who uses the callsign 777. It also features the last appearance of Ana Bertha Lepe.

== Plot ==
Sergeant Diógenes Bravo (Cantinflas) is the Patrolman 777, a member of the Mexico City police. He has a high sense of honesty, but due to his very particular way of solving problems, he is regularly berated by his superior, Major Malagón (Wolf Ruvinskis). While on duty, Bravo meets a group of prostitutes, among them Claudia Loza "La clarines" (Ana Bertha Lepe) and Guadalupe "La Pingüis" (Valeria Pani). Bravo and his partner on the force (Julio Alejandro Lobato) investigate a gang of drug traffickers led by "El Johnny" (Ramón Menéndez), who exploits the prostitutes.

Many other stories take place through the course of the film, such as high-speed races in which wealthy young men participate in public roads and end in disgrace, and a robbery at a high society party. Once, while patrolling at night, Bravo stops to help a young man in a serenade, and in another case, he attends a case of domestic violence in which it is the wife (Ofelia Guilmáin) that beats her husband, and in which Bravo has to run away before the lady ends up beating him too; and in another case, Bravo ends up going through a delivery for the first time and in the absence of the ambulance he manages to get out the baby, and even a suicide attempt to in which he has to climb the ledge of a building to rescue the suicidal man (Fernando Luján).

In the climax of the film, Bravo and his partner stop near the Tlalpan road a band from which they confiscate high-powered weapons, including grenades. Subsequently, "La Pingüis" provides information to Bravo about an illegal operation by El Johnny's gang. Bravo and his partner attend the scene, where they are received with gunshots, during which Bravo results injured. To prevent the escape of criminals, Bravo uses one of the seized grenades to blow up a truck full of drugs. Bravo is congratulated by his superiors and the film ends in a formal ceremony in which he is promoted to Lieutenant, with the police contingent activating the sirens of his vehicles as a sign of respect.

== Cast ==
- Mario Moreno «Cantinflas» as Diógenes Bravo, Patrolman 777
- Ana Bertha Lepe as Claudia Loza "La clarines"
- Valeria Pani as Guadalupe "La Pingüis"
- Wolf Ruvinskis as Major Urbano Malagón
- Julio Alejandro Lobato as Patrolman 777's partner
- Ramón Menéndez as El Johnny
- Carlos Riquelme as Deputy
- Samia Farah as Tarzana de la Flor "La rompecatres" ("The Cot Breaker")
- Rosángela Balbó as Blonde guest at party
- Yolanda Rigel as Nurse
- Mayte Carol as Sofía Beltrán "La chofi"
- María Montaño as Dolores Barreto "La motivosa"
- César Sobrevals as Marcos Muñoz
- Ángel de la Peña García (como Angel de la Peña)
- Federico González as Second Shift Deputy
- Jose Luis Said
- Eduardo Noriega as Father of arrogant young man
- Amparo Arozamena as Lady in police station
- Laura Zapata as Miss in police station
- Alejandro Ciangherotti as Serenade Man
- Ofelia Guilmáin as Violent Wife
- Fernando Luján as Suicidal Man
- Pompín Iglesias as Priest
- Eva Calvo as Mother-in-law of suicidal man
- Guillermo Orea as Drunk Lawyer
- Norma Herrera as Pregnant Woman
- Alfonso Carti as Policeman who arrests "La clarines" (uncredited)
- Alberto Catalá as Secretary of police station (uncredited)
- Leonardo Daniel as Arrogant young man (uncredited)
- Cecilia Leger as Neighbor of suicidal man (uncredited)
- Maricruz Nájera as Neighbor of suicidal man (uncredited)
- Carlos Suárez as Policeman (uncredited)
- Marcelo Villamil as Party guest (uncredited)
- Fernando Yapur as El Johnny's henchman (uncredited)

== Reception ==
In Cantinflas and the Chaos of Mexican Modernity, Professor Jeffrey M. Pilcher questioned the idea of the film portraying a sympathetic policeman, noting that at the time, corruption within the Mexico City police reached new highs under chief of police Arturo "El Negro" Durazo, who was under indictment in the United States for drug trafficking, and accused Cantinflas of "pathetically selling out his beloved old gendarme character to the power elite." Pilcher stated that "the irony was not lost on reviewers," citing that reviewers at the time described the film as "a contribution to making the abominable and feared 'blues' [of the capital's police force] sympathetic." With regards of Cantinflas's performance, Pilcher stated, "Having gone thick in the middle at the age of sixty-six, he fit poorly in a police uniform; drooping pants had become completely unthinkable. But advanced years did not stop him from carrying his duties of karate chopping drug pushers, rescuing fallen women, and lecturing hippies." Both Carlos Monsiváis in Los ídolos a nado and Joanne Hershfield and David R. Maciel in Mexico's Cinema: A Century of Film and Filmmakers considered that the film "confirmed that it is impossible the return to the vehemence of The Unknown Policeman."

== Bibliography ==
- Pilcher, Jeffrey M. Cantinflas and the Chaos of Mexican Modernity. Rowman & Littlefield, 2001.
- Monsiváis, Carlos. Los ídolos a nado: Una antología global. Penguin Random House Grupo Editorial España, 2011.
- Hershfield, Joanne; Maciel, David R. Mexico's Cinema: A Century of Film and Filmmakers. Rowman & Littlefield, 1999.
