= Fernando Wagner =

German-Mexican actor, director, theatre practitioner (1905–1973)

- Born: 7 November 1905; Göttingen, Province of Hanover, German Empire (now in Lower Saxony, Germany)
- Died: 20 October 1973 (aged 67); Mexico City, Mexico
- Occupations: Actor; Director; Teacher
- Years active: 1930–1973

Fernando Wagner (November 7, 1905 – October 20, 1973) was a German actor, theatre and film director, and teacher. He lived in Mexico beginning in the 1930s, and worked at length during the Golden Age of Mexican Cinema. La Jornada Semanal cited him as one of the forefathers of Mexican theatre, alongside Rodolfo Usigli and Seki Sano.

== Early life and education ==
Wagner was born in Göttingen in the Province of Hanover in 1905. His family already held close ties to Mexico, his grandfather had emigrated to Veracruz in 1849 and founded the music shop Casa Wagner y Levien (now Repertorio Wagner) in Mexico City. He studied acting in Berlin under Max Reinhardt and Leopold Jessner.

== Career ==
=== Theatre ===
Wagner moved to Mexico in 1930, to work as a theatre and drama teacher at the Instituto Nacional de Bellas Artes y Literatura and later the National Autonomous University of Mexico, where he taught an innovative experimental theatre workshop and worked with Seki Sano. Among his pupils were Juan José Arreola, Gunther Gerzso, Luisa Josefina Hernández, Jorge Ibargüengoitia, and Nancy Cárdenas. He later wrote an educational book on theatre, Teoria y Tecnica Teatral, published in 1970.

=== Film ===
Wagner was also an actor in Mexican films, including The Pearl (1947), Adventures of Casanova (1948), Mexico's first 3D movie The Price of Living (1954), The Empty Star (1958), and Su Excelencia (1967). He acted opposite many major stars of the Golden Age of Mexican Cinema, including Pedro Armendáriz, Ernesto Alonso, Miroslava, and Cantinflas. He directed several films and telenovelas.

He also appeared in several international and Hollywood productions shot in Mexico. Notably, he played a supporting role in Sam Peckinpah's The Wild Bunch (1969), playing the German military advisor to the villain General Mapache (his real-life friend and collaborator Emilio Fernández).

== Death ==
Wagner died in Mexico City in 1973 of injuries in a car accident. His body was interred at Panteón Jardín.

== Partial filmography ==
- La familia Dressel (1935) - Invitado alemán
- Symphony of Life (1946)
- La Perla (1947) - Dealer 1
- Adventures of Casanova (1948) - Assassinated Commander (uncredited)
- Tarzan and the Mermaids (1948) - Varga - Pearl Trader
- Sofia (1948) - Dr. Erik Viertel
- My Outlaw Brother (1951) - Burger
- Del can-can al mambo (1951) - Embajador de Austria-Hungria (uncredited)
- Un príncipe de la iglesia (1952)
- El Monstruo resucitado (1953) - Gherásimos
- The Player (1953) - Esposo de Yolanda
- The Photographer (1953) - Jefe de villanos
- The Price of Living (1954)
- Garden of Evil (1954) - Steamboat Captain (uncredited)
- La Bruja (1954) - Jan
- De ranchero a empresario (1954)
- Seven Cities of Gold (1955) - Blacksmith (uncredited)
- Sierra Baron (1958) - Grandall
- Virgin Sacrifice (1959) - Fernando
- The Empty Star (1960)
- Cuando ¡Viva Villa..! es la muerte (1960) - Cain Pianni
- Rosa Blanca (1961) - Von Allpenstock
- Cri Cri el grillito cantor (1963) - Editor
- Una cara para escapar (1963)
- Viva Maria! (1965) - Father of Maria II
- El derecho de nacer (1966) - Dr. Steiner
- Su Excelencia (1967) - Representante de Salchichonia
- La vuelta del Mexicano (1967)
- The Wild Bunch (1969) - Commander Mohr
- Los corrompidos (1971) - Williams
- El cielo y tu (1971) - Sr. Khoner
- Santo en Anónimo mortal (1975) - Old Nazi (final film role)
