= The Extra (1962 film) =

- Directed by: Miguel M. Delgado
- Screenplay by: Miguel M. Delgado (screenplay); Jaime Salvador (adaptation); Alfredo Varela Jr. (adaptation); Carlos León (dialogue)
- Story by: Alfredo Varela Jr. José María Fernández Unsáin
- Produced by: Jacques Gelman
- Starring: Mario Moreno «Cantinflas» Alma Delia Fuentes
- Cinematography: Rosalío Solano
- Edited by: Jorge Bustos
- Music by: Gustavo César Carrión
- Production company: Posa Films
- Distributed by: Columbia Pictures
- Release date: 4 October 1962 (Mexico)
- Running time: 110 minutes
- Country: Mexico
- Language: Spanish

The Extra (Spanish: El extra) is a 1962 Mexican comedy film directed by Miguel M. Delgado and starring Mario Moreno «Cantinflas» and Alma Delia Fuentes. This film features of which there is a special participation of Xavier López "Chabelo" and Irma Serrano "La Tigresa". This was the last Cantinflas film whose art direction was made by long-time set designer Gunther Gerzso.

== Plot ==
Rogaciano (Cantinflas) is the modest worker of a Mexican film studio, who performs several roles as an extra in the films shot there. His excessive zeal at work causes the antipathy of successive directors who do not support his forays into their films. After his run-ins into film sets, he dreams that he is the protagonist of each of the productions of which he has participated, such as him playing a sans-culotte and saving Marie Antoinette in a film about the French Revolution, being the lover of Marguerite Gautier in a retelling of La Dame aux Camélias in which she survives, and saving a maiden from an Aztec sacrifice by fighting a warrior (defeating him by fighting him as if it were a bullfight) in an Aztec film.

In one of the productions Rogaciano is in, he meets Rosita (Alma Delia Fuentes), a young woman who also works as an extra, who is initially disappointed in the treatment of the studio workers, who tell her that they don't need more people like her to work there. Rogaciano, seeing the situation of Rosita, who is the guardian of her two younger brothers and has economic deficiencies, helps her to be chosen as an actress in an audition for a blockbuster conducted by the directors of the studio where Rogaciano and Rosita work. After signing Rosita to a contract, the directors, having been made aware of Rosita's relation to Rogaciano, tell her that from now on she must not get involved with him due to Rogaciano's low social status. Rosita is reluctant to this, but Rogaciano learns this and, albeit heartbroken, convinces her to follow through it.

== Cast ==
- Mario Moreno «Cantinflas» as Rogaciano
- Alma Delia Fuentes as Rosa Hernández "Rosita"
- Carmen Molina as Actress who plays Marguerite Gautier
- Guillermina Téllez Girón as Actress with torta
- Magda Donato as Actress who plays Olympia
- Alejandro Ciangherotti as Director of Aztec scene
- León Barroso as Film director
- Luis Manuel Pelayo as Director of cowboy scene
- Eric del Castillo as Actor who plays Armand Duval (as J.E. Eric del Castillo)
- Guillermo Rivas as Actor who plays villain on French Revolution scene
- Antonio Raxel as Director of La Dame aux Camélias scene
- Armando Arriola as Doctor
- Gerardo del Castillo as Mr. Menéndez (as Gerardo del Castillo Jr.)
- Edmundo Espino as Don Julián
- Valentín Trujillo as Chevo, Rosa's brother (as Valentin Trujillo Gazcon)
- Adrián Gallardo
- Xavier López "Chabelo" as Panchito (as Javier Lopez Rodriguez "Chabelo")
- Antonio Bravo as Aztec film producer
- Manuel Alvarado as Fat seamster
- Alberto Catalá as Assistant Director
- Enrique Lucero as Actor who plays Aztec priest
- Raúl Meraz as Actor who plays French Revolution soldier
- Roy Fletcher as assistant director of La Dame aux Camélias scene
- Yolanda Ciani as Lilia, actress in cowboy scene
- José Carlos Méndez as Cuco, Rosa's brother
- Katherine George
- Erika Carlsson as Actress who plays Marie Antoinette (Toñita) (as Erika Carlson)
- Arya Morales
- Jorge Casanova as assistant director of Aztec scene
- Armando Gutiérrez as Don Matías
- Gabriel Álvarez
- Arturo Cobo as "Frank Sinatra"
- Irma Serrano "La Tigresa" as Lady at audition
- Armando Acosta as Studio employee (uncredited)
- Marco Antonio Arzate as Actor in cowboy scene (uncredited)
- Felipe de Flores as Actor who plays Captain (uncredited)
- José Luis Fernández as Actor in cowboy scene (uncredited)
- Nathanael León as Villain in cowboy scene (uncredited)
- Rubén Márquez as Martínez, studio employee (uncredited)
- Fernando Yapur as Douglas (uncredited)

== Analysis ==
Professor Jeffrey M. Pilcher, on Cantinflas and the Chaos of Mexican Modernity, argued that in the film, Cantinflas "continued to perpetuate" a theme from his previous films of "helping beautiful young women live fairy tales," and that during his character's dream sequence about the French Revolution, Cantinflas "preached a conservative view of national history" by "inserting referentes to Pancho Villa and the Mexican Revolution within a monarchist speech in defense of Marie Antoinette and respect for a traditional, hierarchical society."

== In popular culture ==
The film is referenced in the Colombian novel Érase una vez en Colombia (Comedia romántica y El espantapájaros) by Ricardo Silva Romero.

== Bibliography ==
- García Riera, Emilio. Historia documental del cine mexicano: 1961. Ediciones Era, 1969.
- Pilcher, Jeffrey M. Cantinflas and the Chaos of Mexican Modernity. Rowman & Littlefield, 2001.
- Silva Romero, Ricardo. Érase una vez en Colombia (Comedia romántica y El espantapájaros). Penguin Random House Grupo Editorial Colombia, 2013.
