= Conserje en condominio =

- Directed by: Miguel M. Delgado
- Written by: Isaac Díaz Araiza; Ramón Obón
- Produced by: Jacques Gelman
- Starring: Mario Moreno «Cantinflas» Claudia Islas; Raquel Olmedo
- Cinematography: Jorge Stahl Jr.
- Edited by: Gloria Schoemann
- Music by: Gustavo César Carrión
- Release date: 11 April 1974 (Mexico)
- Running time: 118 minutes
- Country: Mexico
- Language: Spanish

Conserje en condominio (in English: "Concierge in an Apartment Building") is a 1974 Mexican comedy film directed by Miguel M. Delgado and starring Mario Moreno «Cantinflas», Claudia Islas and Raquel Olmedo.

== Plot ==
After reading an ad in a newspaper, Úrsulo (Cantinflas) takes a job as a concierge of a luxurious apartment building inhabited by eccentric people who all turn to him to solve their various problems. But when someone in the building kidnaps an important person, Úrsulo must become an investigator and find the kidnapped and the kidnappers.

== Cast ==
- Mario Moreno «Cantinflas» as Úrsulo
- Claudia Islas as Jackie
- Raquel Olmedo as Clodomira
- Chucho Salinas as Lic. Silverio Rojas "Rojitas" (as Jesus Salinas)
- Carlos Riquelme as Administrador González
- Bertha Moss as Señora Candy
- Eugenia Avendaño as Señora Margo
- Ricardo Carrión as Danny
- Gloria Mayo as Lisa
- Eduardo Alcaraz as Lic. Rufino
- Gladys Vivas as Ad Director
- Diana Torres as Domitila
- Mitzuko Miguel as Señorita Erica
- Gerardo del Castillo as Melesio Martínez (as Gerardo del Castillo Jr.)
- Carlos Cámara as Jorge
- Carlos Nieto as Police Chief
- Irene Moreno as Nancy
- Carlos León as Commander
- María Fernanda Ampudia as Blonde spiritualist
- Jacobo Zabludovsky as Reporter
- Guillermo Bravo Sosa as Spiritualist (uncredited)
- Alfonso Carti as Policeman (uncredited)
- Jorge Casanova as Neighbour (uncredited)
- Lilia Castillo as Candy's Maid (uncredited)
- Velia Lupercio as Train Passenger (uncredited)
- Rubén Márquez as Spiritualist (uncredited)
- Mariana Ponzanelli (uncredited)
- Paco Sañudo (uncredited)

== Reception ==
The presence of hippies in the film and Cantinflas's character clashing with them was seen by Professor Jeffrey M. Pilcher in Cantinflas and the Chaos of Mexican Modernity as "part of a struggle to represent Mexico's national identity," with Cantinflas's character representing the "pelado from the 1930s." Pilcher noted, however, that "although Cantinflas triumphed over the hippies on screen, many young people considered him a momiza (square)." Both Carlos Monsiváis in Los ídolos a nado and Joanne Hershfield and David R. Maciel in Mexico's Cinema: A Century of Film and Filmmakers considered it among Cantinflas's most "sad and pathetic" films, alongside El ministro y yo (1976).

== Bibliography ==
- García Riera, Emilio. Historia documental del cine mexicano: 1972–1973. Universidad de Guadalajara, 1992.
- Pilcher, Jeffrey M. Cantinflas and the Chaos of Mexican Modernity. Rowman & Littlefield, 2001.
- Monsiváis, Carlos. Los ídolos a nado: Una antología global. Penguin Random House Grupo Editorial España, 2011.
- Hershfield, Joanne; Maciel, David R. Mexico's Cinema: A Century of Film and Filmmakers. Rowman & Littlefield, 1999.
