= Por mis pistolas =

Por mis pistolas may refer to:

- Por mis pistolas (1968 film), a Mexican comedy western film
- Por mis pistolas (1938 film), a Mexican comedy drama film
