= Gran Hotel (film) =

1944 Mexican film directed by Miguel M. Delgado

- Directed by: Miguel M. Delgado
- Written by: Miguel M. Delgado
- Story by: Jaime Salvador
- Starring: Mario Moreno «Cantinflas» Jacqueline Dalya; Josefina Martínez
- Cinematography: Alex Phillips
- Edited by: Jorge Bustos
- Music by: Manuel Esperón
- Production company: Posa Films
- Distributed by: Columbia Pictures
- Release date: 18 August 1944
- Running time: 106 minutes
- Country: Mexico
- Language: Spanish

Gran Hotel (English: Grand Hotel) is a 1944 Mexican film directed and written by Miguel M. Delgado, and starring Mario Moreno «Cantinflas», Jacqueline Dalya and Josefina Martínez.

== Plot ==
Cantinflas is a tramp who is evicted for not paying the rent. After wandering, he gets a job at the "Gran Hotel" through a friend, where he is confused with the Duke of Alfanje, who is incognito in the hotel, and the theft of a jewel further complicates the situation.

== Cast ==
- Mario Moreno as Cantinflas / El Trece
- Jacqueline Dalya as Mrs. White
- Josefina Martínez as Carmelita
- Luis G. Barreiro as Sr. Garnier
- Fernando Soto as Compadre
- Vicente Padula as Conde Zapattini
- Conchita Gentil Arcos as Doña Estefania
- Rafael Icardo as Señor Polilla
- Luz María Núñez as Eloisa
- Ángel T. Sala as Agente secreto en hotel
- Carlos Villarías as Don Pepe
- Roberto Meyer as Agente de procuraduria
- Roberto Corell as Maître
- Estanislao Shilinsky as Recepcionista de hotel
- Carolina Barret as Vecina (uncredited)
- Roberto Cañedo as Cliente restaurante (uncredited)
- Fernando Curiel as Agente de policía (uncredited)
- Pedro Elviro as Botones (uncredited)
- Edmundo Espino as Vecino en posada (uncredited)
- Magdalena Estrada as Vecina en posada (uncredited)
- Isabel Herrera as Vecina en posada (uncredited)
- Raúl Lechuga as Duque de Alfanje / Empleado de hotel (uncredited)
- Ernesto Monato as Julio, cliente de hotel (uncredited)
- Rosa María Montes as Esposa de Julio (uncredited)
- José Pardavé as Vecino en posada (uncredited)
- José Pulido as Anunciador restaurante (uncredited)
- Joaquín Roche as Doctor (uncredited)
- Irma Torres as Vecina en posada (uncredited)
- Armando Velasco as Don Fulgencio (uncredited)

== Bibliography ==
- Stavans, Ilan. The Riddle of Cantinflas: Essays on Hispanic Popular Culture, Revised and Expanded Edition. UNM Press, 2012.
- Balderston, Daniel; González, Mike; López, Ana M. Encyclopedia of Contemporary Latin American and Caribbean Cultures. Routledge, 2002.
