= Sube y baja =

1959 film by Miguel M. Delgado

- Directed by: Miguel M. Delgado
- Written by: Miguel M. Delgado (adaptation, screenplay); Carlos León (additional dialogue); Jaime Salvador (adaptation)
- Story by: Jaime Salvador
- Produced by: Santiago Reachi
- Starring: Mario Moreno «Cantinflas» Teresa Velázquez; Georgina Barragán; Joaquín García "Borolas"; Domingo Soler; Carlos Agostí
- Cinematography: Alex Phillips
- Edited by: Jorge Bustos
- Music by: Gonzalo Curiel; Raúl Lavista
- Production company: Posa Films
- Distributed by: Columbia Pictures
- Release date: 2 May 1959
- Running time: 108 minutes
- Country: Mexico
- Language: Spanish

Sube y baja (aka Up and Down) is a 1959 Mexican comedy film written and directed by Miguel M. Delgado and starring Mario Moreno «Cantinflas», Teresa Velázquez, Georgina Barragán, Joaquín García "Borolas", Domingo Soler and Carlos Agostí. This film marked the film debut of the peruvian actress, Ofelia Montesco, in uncredited roles, and also it features of which there is a special participation of the Benitez Sisters. The film's art direction was by Gunther Gerszo.

== Plot ==
Don Gaspar, the owner of a successful, prestigious sporting goods store, decides to hire a poor uncouth sports fan as a salesman, after seeing him play an American football game and being impressed. In the meantime, a millionaire woman named Lucy, who is infatuated with Jorge Maciel, a world famous professional athlete who will spend his vacation in Acapulco, is determined to enamor him and takes her chance alongside her sister Margarita, who is himself interested in Maciel. Due to a sort of eccentricity Maciel is unknown to everyone since he adamantly refuses to be photographed.

When Cantinflas starts working in the store, his lack of business savvy and destructive nature cause numerous incidents of distrust among prospective customers. Regardless, Don Gaspar does not fire him despite the constant accusations of Señor Robalo, the manager who sees all the disasters, due to the hunch that he'll be very useful for something. However, when Cantinflas insults Don Gaspar's wife Don Gaspar reluctantly degrades him to become the elevator's operator, and later decides to send him to Acapulco to try to convince Jorge Maciel to sign an advertising contract that will garner much more income to Don Gaspar's company.

Cantinflas, when traveling to Acapulco with his compadre and registering at the hotel, is given suite No. 7 as a courtesy. He is mistaken by accident with the same Jorge Maciel by Lucy after being told Maciel would stay in that suite. After recognizing Lucy who unknowingly had met Cantinflas in the elevator, he decides to take his chances after and confessing their mutual attraction he tells her about his plan to meet Maciel. When he hears she believes him to be Maciel he decides to maintain the charade despite knowing that the true Jorge Maciel is due to arrive. The hotel requests his competition in several sports categories to highlight "his" presence, from which he wins all.

The real Jorge Maciel arrives at the hotel and finds out about Cantinflas' usurpation by reading an announcement of "his" competition in a boat race. Despite his companion's demand he decides not to unmask Cantinflas because he wants to know who he is and what he wants. He stays with a false name and keeps an eye on the man all the time without being noticed.

In the end, Lucy, very much in love with the fake Jorge Maciel, proposes that they live together far away. Shortly afterwards, in a costume party done in Maciel's honor the real Maciel reveals himself to Cantinflas and asks for an explanation. After stating the whole purpose of his visit he explains that upon meeting Lucy and falling in love with her, he decided to impersonate him to maintain that love since he was unable to tell her the truth. Maciel promises not to tell her anything and forgives him for everything. However, Lucy's friend discovers it all by hearing their conversation in secret.

The next morning, Lucy learns that the fake Maciel left the hotel at dawn without telling her anything, and her friend who discovered who he is offers to take her to meet up with the same Maciel. Cantinflas returns to the sporting goods store and Don Gaspar, furious about failing the mission he entrusted to him, returns him to his elevator operator post to pay back the 100000 pesos spent on the trip; however, afterwards Jorge Maciel voluntarily appears at the store and presents himself to Don Gaspar to tell him that he will sign the document, only in return for the happiness of the person sent to achieve that purpose.

Lucy and her friend arrive at the sporting goods store, and seeing that her hero was nothing more than an elevator operator, she leaves very angry and disappointed. Just as Cantinflas is about to leave heartbroken Señor Robalo arrives to tell him Don Gaspar wants to talk to him. Don Gaspar appoints him general manager of the store for having managed to sign the contract with Jorge Maciel. In the end, Cantinflas, now general manager of the store, meets Lucy again and both reconcile.

== Cast ==
- Mario Moreno as Cantinflas/False Jorge Maciel
- Teresa Velázquez as Lucy
- Joaquín García "Borolas" as Borolas, Cantinflas' compadre (as Joaquín García Vargas "Borolas")
- Domingo Soler as Don Gaspar
- Carlos Agostí as Jorge Maciel/Luigi Martinelli
- Alejandro Ciangherotti as Pedro, Lucy's companion
- Georgina Barragán as Margarita, Lucy's sister
- Luis Manuel Pelayo
- Mercedes Ruffino as Adelaida, Don Gaspar's wife (as Mercedes V. de Ruffino)
- León Barroso as Señor Robalo
- Eduardo Charpenel
- Alberto Catalá
- José Jasso «El Ojón» as American Football referee
- Armando Gutiérrez
- Pedro Elviro (as Pedro Elviro "Pitouto")
- José Luis Caro
- Carlos León
- Felipe de Flores
- Carlos Robles Gil
- Margarito Luna
- Salvador Terroba
- Roberto Meyer
- Manuel Trejo Morales
- Ricardo Adalid
- Roy Fletcher
- Lina Marín
- Hermanas Benitez as Themselves
- Ofelia Montesco as Woman in elevator (uncredited)

== Bibliography ==
- García Riera, Emilio. Historia documental del cine mexicano: 1958. Ediciones Era, 1975.
- Lozoya, Jorge Alberto; Agrasánchez, Rogelio. Cine mexicano. Lunwerg Editores, 2006.
