= The Three Musketeers (1942 film) =

- Theatrical release poster
- Directed by: Miguel M. Delgado
- Written by: Jaime Salvador
- Based on: The Three Musketeers; 1844 novel by Alexandre Dumas
- Produced by: Jacques Gelman
- Starring: Mario Moreno «Cantinflas», Janet Alcoriza, Consuelo Frank, Pituka de Foronda
- Cinematography: Gabriel Figueroa
- Edited by: Emilio Gómez Muriel
- Music by: Manuel Esperón
- Production company: Posa Films
- Distributed by: Columbia Pictures
- Release date: 1942
- Running time: 138 minutes
- Country: Mexico
- Language: Spanish

The Three Musketeers (Spanish: Los tres mosqueteros) is a 1942 Mexican comedy film directed by Miguel M. Delgado and starring Mario Moreno «Cantinflas», Janet Alcoriza, Consuelo Frank and Pituka de Foronda. This film is based on the 1844 novel of the same name by Alexandre Dumas.

== Plot ==
Cantinflas and three friends return a stolen necklace to an actress who invites them to be extras at the CLASA film studios. While on the set, Cantinflas falls asleep and dreams that he is d'Artagnan, fighting on behalf of Queen Anne.

== Cast ==
- Mario Moreno - Cantinflas / D'Artagnan
- Ángel Garasa - Cardenal Richelieu
- Janet Alcoriza - Mimí / Milady de Winter (as Raquel Rojas)
- Consuelo Frank - Reina / Ana de Austria
- Pituka de Foronda - Constancia / Sra. Bonacieux
- Andrés Soler - Athos
- Julio Villarreal - Rey Luis XIII
- Jorge Reyes - Duque de Buckingham
- Estanislao Schillinsky - Aramis
- José Elías Moreno - Portos
- Rafael Icardo - Comisario / Sr. de Treville
- Antonio Bravo - Rochefort
- María Calvo - Estefanía, doncella
- Salvador Quiroz - Tabernero
- Alfonso Bedoya - Gorila en cabaret
- José Arratia - Antonio Bonacieux (uncredited)
- Alfonso Carti - Policía (uncredited)
- Roberto Cañedo - Joven en la cola (uncredited)
- María Claveria - Madre de D'Artagnan (uncredited)
- Manuel Dondé - Capitán (uncredited)
- Pedro Elviro - Mesero / Posadero (uncredited)
- Edmundo Espino - Padre de D'Artagnan (uncredited)
- Ana María Hernández - Dama de la corte (uncredited)
- Rubén Márquez - Hombre bailando en cabaret (uncredited)
- Ignacio Peón - Sirviente del rey (uncredited)
- Jorge Rachini - John, sirviente del duque (uncredited)
- Humberto Rodríguez - Sacerdote (uncredited)
- Estanislao Shilinsky

== Production ==
Posa Films hired a number of established stars to support its contract actor Cantinflas. Miguel M. Delgado, who was already considered "Cantinflas' exclusive director", was assigned to direct the production. Jaime Salvador, whose screenplay for the previous Cantinflas vehicle El gendarme desconocido brought him fame, adapted Dumas' novel for the screen. Ballet Theatre, a dance group of the time, was employed to perform the ballet in the throne room scene.

== Release ==
Los tres mosqueteros was a financial success. It "broke all box-office records" in Mexico and earned 123,000 pesos in its first week and 248,000 in the following three weeks.

== Accolades ==
At the 1946 Cannes Film Festival, Los tres mosqueteros competed for the Grand Prix, which was awarded to another Mexican film, María Candelaria (1943).
