= El barrendero =

- Directed by: Miguel M. Delgado
- Screenplay by: Mario Moreno «Cantinflas» Isaac Díaz Araiza; Fernando Galiana; Mario Reyes
- Produced by: Jacques Gelman
- Starring: Mario Moreno «Cantinflas» María Sorté; Úrsula Prats; Luz María Rico; Roxana Chávez
- Cinematography: Rosalío Solano
- Edited by: Gloria Schoemann
- Music by: Gustavo César Carrión
- Production company: Cantinflas Films S.A.
- Distributed by: Columbia Pictures
- Release date: 5 May 1982 (Mexico)
- Running time: 113 minutes
- Country: Mexico
- Language: Spanish

El barrendero (in English, The Street Sweeper) is a 1982 Mexican comedy film directed by Miguel M. Delgado and starring Mario Moreno «Cantinflas», María Sorté, Úrsula Prats, Luz María Rico and Roxana Chávez. It has been cited as an example of a "Mexploitation" film. It is Cantinflas's last film, ending a career that had lasted since 1936.

== Plot ==
Napoleón (Cantinflas) is a humble street sweeper who flirts with all the maids in the neighborhood where he works (all of whom call him affectionately "Don Napo"), of which Chipinita (María Sorté) stands out. Napoleon ends up being the only witness to the theft of a valuable painting, and he is threatened by the thieves of the painting and also becomes a suspect.

== Cast ==
- Mario Moreno «Cantinflas» as Napoleón Pérez García "Don Napo"
- María Sorté as Chipinita
- Úrsula Prats as Lupita
- Luz Elena Silva
- Eduardo Alcaraz as Don Chafas
- Federico González as Supervisor Molina
- Antonio Zubiaga as Skinny Thief
- Luz María Rico as Rosita
- Sara Guasch as Blonde woman at party
- José Luis Avendaño as Mendoza
- Roxana Chávez as Chabelita
- Alberto Catalá as Basurita
- Alfredo Gutiérrez as Police Deputy
- Adalberto Arvizu as Thief (as Alberto Arvizu)
- Mariela Flores
- Gerardo del Castillo as General Secretary
- Lina Michel as French Maid
- Evita Muñoz "Chachita" as Pachita
- Julio Monterde as Party Guest (uncredited)
- José Nájera as Father of abandoned baby (uncredited)
- Elvia Pedroza as Doña Chumina, porter (uncredited)
- Marcelo Villamil as Party Guest (uncredited)

== Bibliography ==
- Amador, María Luisa; Ayala Blanco, Jorge. Cartelera cinematográfica, 1980–1989. UNAM, 2006.
- Rohrer, Seraina. La India María: Mexploitation and the Films of María Elena Velasco. University of Texas Press, 2017.
