= El profe =

1972 Mexican film by Miguel M. Delgado

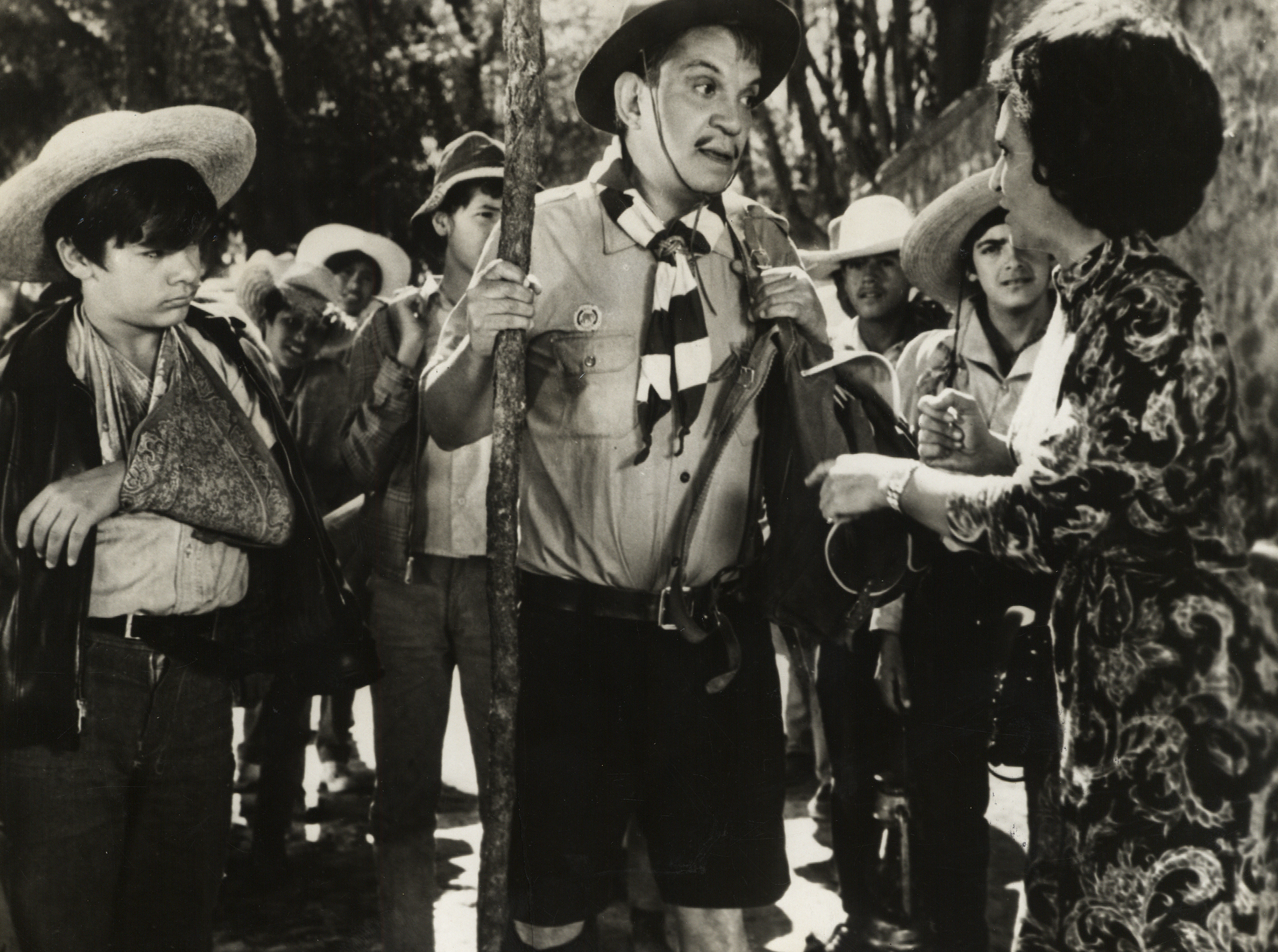
- Directed by: Miguel M. Delgado
- Written by: Carlos León (dialogue); Alfredo Ruanova (adaptation)
- Story by: Mario Moreno «Cantinflas» Jaime Salvador
- Produced by: Jacques Gelman
- Starring: Mario Moreno «Cantinflas» Marga López
- Cinematography: Gabriel Figueroa
- Edited by: Gloria Schoemann
- Music by: Sergio Guerrero
- Production company: Posa Films
- Distributed by: Columbia Pictures
- Release date: 8 April 1972 (Mexico)
- Running time: 120 minutes
- Country: Mexico
- Language: Spanish

El profe (aka The Professor) is a 1972 Mexican comedy film directed by Miguel M. Delgado and starring Mario Moreno «Cantinflas» and Marga López. This film features the last appearance of Arturo de Córdova.

== Plot ==
Sócrates García (Cantinflas) is a primary school teacher who is assigned by the principal of the school he works in to administer another school located in the town of El Romeral, as he is the only teacher from that school who is single.

When Sócrates arrives at the train station in the nearby town of San Bartolo, nobody receives him there. In El Romeral Sócrates instead meets an arriero who is going to the town in his cart and takes Sócrates to El Romeral. When he arrives in town, he is received by the townspeople, including the municipal president (or mayor), Lucas Campuzano (Eduardo MacGregor) and Don Margarito Vázquez (Víctor Alcocer), the town's cacique (political boss). The municipal president presents Sócrates to the important people, but his and Don Margarito’s personalities immediately clash. However he easily befriends the priest and Doña Hortensia (Marga López), also taking an immediate infatuation with her. Campuzano asks Sócrates to address to the people a few words, but while he gave his speech the floor of the platform he was in collapses. Doña Hortensia also hosts him. He asks where his school is to inspect it, only to discover that it is in ruins.

Sócrates presence comes as a blessing to the town’s people; he shows that his devotion to his students is much deeper than obvious, as he learns of the bad life conditions of some of them. He convinces a drunkard man (Ramón Valdés) to stop trying to forget the loss of his lands due to tricks of Don Margarito by drinking and for his wife (Angelines Fernández) to cease mistreating her son. He also makes an extremely slothful woman change her ways and raises money with his students to fix the school after experiencing the indifference of the town’s men. However, he also finds some setbacks such as the attitude of Don Margarito’s lackeys and with a rebellious and defiant boy named Felipe. He also deals with certain obstacles, such as the eviction from their school since the owner wants to turn it to a saloon and there’s no contract to prove otherwise. This forces him to create an open-field school, with columns of reeds, all caused by Don Margarito and covered by the mayor. Sócrates writes a letter to the Governor asking for a school to be made, but it is intercepted by Don Margarito's henchmen. When no response comes, Sócrates grows suspicious and sneaks into the mayor's office to find the letter, but instead discovers documents revealing that Don Margarito has been illegally taking the land from the peasants.

Meanwhile, Sócrates and Hortensia begin a romance. Sócrates asks Hortensia for some photos; she sees it as a friendship deal and brings them, with Sócrates telling her that the photos are for his wallet. Grateful, Sócrates decides to serenade Hortensia with his students. Then, Sócrates takes his students to a field trip and, despite the apparent inexperience of Sócrates to camp (despite wearing a boy scout uniform), manages to make his students more loyal to him, to the point that they to dismantle the saloon that was put in place of the school, unleashing a fight in which Sócrates finally rescues his students. As a result of the fight, Don Margarito and his men burn Sócrates's improvised open-field school. A frustrated Sócrates at first decides to leave the town, but the love of Hortensia and the loyalty of his students make him change his mind.

The announcement that the Governor (Arturo de Córdova) will make a visit to the town represents a salvation for Sócrates and the townspeople themselves. Don Margarito and his henchmen kidnap Sócrates to force the people to remain silent, but his students, with a remorseful Felipe’s help manage to rescue him after convincing Felipe to reveal his whereabouts (as Felipe's father is one of Don Margarito's henchmen), in a small hut, and Sócrates gives the Governor the documents that reveal Don Margarito's crimes, with the remorseful mayor admitting to his actions. After this, Sócrates asks the Governor to build a school; the Governor grants his request. The film ends in front of the new school, with Sócrates and Hortensia walking together as the students sing to them.

== Cast ==
- Mario Moreno «Cantinflas» as Professor Sócrates García
- Marga López as Hortensia
- Víctor Alcocer as Don Margarito Vázquez
- David Bravo as Fermín
- Raúl Martínez as Pedro González (as Raul A. Martinez)
- Eduardo MacGregor as Lucas Campuzano, municipal president
- Luciano Hernández de la Vega as Father Gonzalo
- René Dupeyrón as Martín (as René Dupeyrón Unda)
- Gerardo del Castillo as Don Zenaido (as Gerardo del Castillo Jr.)
- Eduardo López Rojas as Espiridión Cascajo
- Rogelio Gaona as Carmelo (as Rogelio Gaona Guerra)
- León Barroso as School Principal
- Claudio Sorel as Felipe's father, henchman of Don Margarito (as Victor Sorel)
- Arturo de Córdova as Governor
- José Luis Caro as Married Professor (uncredited)
- Jorge Casanova as Married Professor (uncredited)
- Margarita Delgado as Doña Sara, Carmelo's mother (uncredited)
- José Dupeyrón as Zenaido's henchman (uncredited)
- Angelines Fernández as Martín's mother (uncredited)
- Regino Herrera as Villager (uncredited)
- Margarito Luna as Peasant with donkey (uncredited)
- Inés Murillo as Fermín's mother (uncredited)
- Rubén Márquez as Married Professor (uncredited)
- Ramón Valdés as Martín's father (uncredited)

== Bibliography ==
- Lomas García, Carlos. Érase una vez la escuela: Los ecos de la escuela en las voces de la literatura. Grao, 2007.
- García Riera, Emilio. Historia documental del cine mexicano: 1959–1960. University of Guadalajara, 1994.
