= Union of Cinema Production Workers =

Union of Cinema Production Workers (Spanish: Sindicato de Trabajadores de la Producción Cinematográfica or S.T.P.C. de la R.M) was an autonomous (non-"charro"-led) Mexican trade union. It was formed in 1944 after splitting off from the CTM-affiliated Union of Cinema Industry Workers (Sindicato de Trabajadores de la Industria Cinematográfica, (STIC)). Mario Moreno "Cantinflas" served as its first secretary general.
