= Su Excelencia =

- Theatrical release poster
- Directed by: Miguel M. Delgado
- Screenplay by: Carlos León
- Story by: Marco A. Almazán; Cantinflas
- Produced by: Jacques Gelman
- Starring: Mario Moreno «Cantinflas» Sonia Infante
- Cinematography: Rosalío Solano
- Edited by: Jorge Bustos
- Music by: Sergio Guerrero
- Production company: Posa Films
- Distributed by: Columbia Pictures
- Release date: 3 May 1967 (Mexico)
- Running time: 133 minutes
- Country: Mexico
- Language: Spanish

Su Excelencia (aka Your Excellency) is a 1967 Mexican political satire comedy film directed by Miguel M. Delgado and starring Mario Moreno «Cantinflas» and Sonia Infante. The film is set in a parody universe where "Red" and "Green" countries are the political equivalents of the socialist and capitalist countries of the Cold War, which the film satirizes. Cantinflas portrays Lupitos, a chancellor stationed in his country's (Republica de Los Cocos) embassy in the communist country of Pepeslavia who later ascends to the role of ambassador and has to decide the pivotal vote of joining the "Reds" or the "Greens", therefore deciding the fate of the entire world.

Su Excelencia, the fourth Cantinflas film distributed by Columbia Pictures, boasted box-office success and is among Cantinflas' most successful films. with its New York premiere scoring a box office victory over Charlie Chaplin's last film, A Countess from Hong Kong, which opened the same week.

== Plot ==
In a world where countries are divided into 3 subgroups (green, red, and sweet countries, a reference to First, Second and Third World countries), Lopez (known affectionately as "Lopitos") is a bureaucrat from the sweet Latin American "Republica de Los Cocos" (a play on the term "banana republic") who is stationed in the embassy of the Communist bloc country "Pepeslavia" (a play on words of Joseph Stalin, the nickname for Joseph in Spanish (José) is "Pepe", and the inflection "-slavia" of Slavic peoples under the rule of the USSR).

Lopitos, who is horribly inefficient but quick-witted, is invited (because of the current ambassador's superstition about 13 sitting down to a meal) to a banquet attended by the ambassadors of both superpowers. After the news of a series of coups d'état in Los Cocos arrives throughout the meal, Lopitos quickly rises to the position of ambassador.

At a summit of world leaders, the representatives of the two world superpowers, "Dolaronia" (referring to the American dollar) and "Pepeslavia", court the allegiances of third-world diplomats to tilt the balance of global power in their favor. The last diplomat to remain unaligned is Lopitos, who shocking announces that he will remain neutral. In a heartfelt speech he denounces the superpowers for infringing on the rights of developing countries to self determination, and attacks policies like state atheism and globalization. He speaks of a Christian stance of love and acceptance and then admits to no longer have the power of an ambassador as he solicited his resignation and thus spoke like a common citizen. After a surprising agreement of both parties Lopitos leaves the summit. His secretary goes after him and both leave hoping for the best.

== Cast ==
- Mario Moreno «Cantinflas» – Lopitos, current ambassador of Los Cocos embassy.
- Sonia Infante – Lolita, personal secretary of Los Cocos embassy.
- Guillermo Zetina – Tirso de la Pompa y Pompa, counselor of Los Cocos embassy.
- Tito Junco – General León Balarrasa, military attaché of Los Cocos embassy.
- Miguel Manzano – Serafín Templado, main secretary of Los Cocos embassy.
- José Gálvez – Osky Popovsky, bureaucrat of Pepeslavia and ardent supporter of the "Red" countries.
- Víctor Alcocer – Admiral Neptuno Aguado, naval attaché of Los Cocos embassy.
- Maura Monti – Tania Mangovna, Agent KGD007 of the Pepeslav government.
- Jack Kelly – Ambassador of Dolaronia and supporter of the "Green" countries.
- Eduardo Alcaraz – Salustio Menchaca, ex-ambassador of Los Cocos embassy.
- Fernando Wagner – Ambassador of Salchichonia who remains neutral.
- Carlos Riquelme – President of Pepeslavia who greets Lopitos.
- Quintín Bulnes – Petrovsky, butler of Los Cocos embassy.
- Eduardo MacGregor – Vasily Vasilov, prime minister of Pepeslavia.
- Luis Manuel Pelayo – Counselor of Pepeslavia
- Fernando Mendoza – Commissar
- Antonio Medellín – Ambassador of Karamba
- Alberto Galán – General Secretary
- Alberto Catalá – Doorman
- Ricardo Adalid – Assembly Doorman (uncredited)
- Daniel Arroyo – Assembly Spectator (uncredited)
- Victorio Blanco – Don Milos Popovich (uncredited)
- Queta Carrasco – Guest at reception (uncredited)
- Jorge Casanova – Secretary (uncredited)
- Farnesio de Bernal – Assembly Representative (uncredited)
- Gerardo del Castillo – Ambassador of Tequesquite (uncredited)
- Victor Eberg – Commissar at dinner (uncredited)
- Pedro Elviro – Commissar at dinner (uncredited)
- Enrique García Álvarez – Guest at reception (uncredited)
- Aarón Hernán – Representative of Bolognia (uncredited)
- Velia Lupercio – Guest at reception (uncredited)
- Rubén Márquez – Commissar at dinner (uncredited)
- Manuel Trejo Morales – Guest at reception (uncredited)
- Fernando Yapur – Commissar at dinner (uncredited)
- Manuel Zozaya – Guest at reception (uncredited)

== Reception ==
The film's political overtones, and the speech by Cantinflas's character at the end of the film, where he lectures world leaders, have been subject of analysis by Cantinflas bibliographers. In Cantinflas and the Chaos of Mexican Modernity, Professor Jeffrey M. Pilcher argued that despite how Cantinflas's character "refused in the end to cast his vote for either side and spent a full fifteen minutes haranguing the rival powers in the name of world peace; nevertheless, he lost the moral high ground of nonaligment through his blatant anticomunism", in reference to the film's storyline about the machinations of Pepeslavia (a clear Soviet Union analogue) to get the character's vote. Pilcher also found the subplot about Pepeslavia assigning a beautiful secret agent to seduce Cantinflas's character "an odd plot twist", noting that the film was made less than a year after the death of Cantinflas's Russian wife. In his Concise Encyclopedia of Mexico, Michael Werner listed the film among those in Cantinflas's later filmography (from El analfabeto onwards) that were "preachy, tedious, and humorless", saying that in the final speech he "offers the Christian doctrine as a solution for the world's problems in an international scenario meant to represent the United Nations". In Looking for Mexico: Modern Visual Culture and National Identity, John Mraz was more critical; sharing similar conclusions to Werner's, but also adding that the final speech showed that "[Cantinflas's] arrogance was unbounded", and that he was "taking himself very seriously".

== Bibliography ==
- Pilcher, Jeffrey M. Cantinflas and the Chaos of Mexican Modernity. Rowman & Littlefield, 2001.
- Werner, Michael. Concise Encyclopedia of Mexico. Taylor & Francis, 2001.
- Mraz, John. Looking for Mexico: Modern Visual Culture and National Identity. Duke University Press, 2009.
