= The Illiterate One =

1961 Mexican comedy film

- Directed by: Miguel M. Delgado
- Screenplay by: Jaime Salvador (adaptation); Carlos León (additional dialogue); Miguel M. Delgado (technical screenplay)
- Story by: Marcelo Salazar; Juan López (original story)
- Produced by: Jacques Gelman
- Starring: Mario Moreno «Cantinflas» Lilia Prado; Ángel Garasa; Sara García
- Cinematography: Víctor Herrera
- Edited by: Jorge Bustos
- Music by: Manuel Esperón
- Production companies: Posa Films International; Estudios Churubusco
- Distributed by: Columbia Pictures
- Release date: September 7, 1961 (Mexico)
- Running time: 128 minutes
- Country: Mexico
- Language: Spanish

The Illiterate One (Spanish: El analfabeto) is a 1961 Mexican comedy film, directed by Miguel M. Delgado, and starring Mario Moreno «Cantinflas», Lilia Prado, Ángel Garasa and Sara García. It is the second Cantinflas film presented by Columbia Pictures.

== Plot ==
An inheritance attorney sends a letter to Inocencio Prieto y Calvo telling him that he is the heir to his uncle's fortune of two million pesos, which he has only to claim by producing his baptismal certificate as proof of identity. However, as an illiterate, Inocencio has no idea of the contents of the letter, even telling his godmother, whom he lives with that it's perhaps someone who wants to borrow money. While waiting for the local druggist to wait on him so he can have the letter read to him, Inocencio is embarrassed to see that a customer's young daughter is able to read while he, a grown man, cannot. He leaves without telling the druggist his problem, resolved to go to school and to wait to learn the letter's contents until he can read them for himself, so that never again will he have to share private matters with others because of his own ignorance. Inspired by this, he registers at his local kindergarten school amidst the mocks of the children. He stops by the local bank to ask for a job, having quit his previous employment that morning. Leaving the bank, he meets Blanca, an attractive young woman newly arrived in town, and shows her the way to her new place of employment, partly to avoid admitting he cannot read the written address. The daughter of Blanca's employer is entertaining her fiancé, Aníbal, who finds Blanca appealing and begins to make advances on her almost immediately. These advances are spurned each time; the final time, Aníbal warns her she will regret her refusals.

Over the course of the film, Inocencio gradually learns to read, courts Blanca, teaches his friends and makes both friends and enemies at the bank. Fermín, a teller, taunts and mistreats Inocencio thinking him inferior. Later Inocencio foils a robbery; Fermín plays a prank on Inocencio by writing a letter pretending that it requests a reward for the deed but actually is demanding for Inocencio to be punished for letting the robbers in. The prank backfires when Don Rómulo, the bank manager, discovers the ruse and reduces Fermín's wages in half. Don Rómulo gives Inocencio a 1000-peso reward, which the grateful man proceeds to spend on a new dress for his godmother, a traditional regional dress for Blanca to wear in a beauty contest, and new shoes for himself (which end up being too small for him). While going about his cleaning work in the bank, Inocencio unwittingly drops the lawyer's letter — which he still has yet to read — and Fermín finds it on the floor. On the day of the contest, Aníbal and Fermín, who are revealed to be cousins, conspire to make it appear that Blanca has stolen her employer's jewels and passed them to Inocencio. Though both are arrested, the trial is cut short when Fermín discovers Aníbal has betrayed him and gone alone to claim the inheritance, leading him to reveal the whole plot, resulting in Inocencio and Blanca being exonerated. Inocencio and his friends rush to Mexico City to thwart the attempt and denounce Aníbal, who is arrested at the lawyer's office after he arrives to claim the funds. After receiving his inheritance Inocencio reveals his plans to buy his godmother a washing machine for her laundry business, as well as funding public schools for other illiterates to learn to read and finally proposing marriage to Blanca. The film concludes with Inocencio's and Blanca's wedding.

== Cast ==
- Mario Moreno «Cantinflas» as Inocencio Prieto y Calvo
- Lilia Prado as Blanca Morales: Inocencio's girlfriend
- Ángel Garasa as Don Rómulo González: Wealthy banker of Guanajuato
- Sara García as Doña Epifanita: Inocencio's godmother
- Miguel Manzano as Don Fermín: Bank employee
- Carlos Agostí as Licenciado Aníbal Guzmán: Ofelia's fiancé
- Daniel «Chino» Herrera as Delmiro, "El Pocaluz": Inocencio's friend
- Fernando Soto «Mantequilla» as Nicandro,, "El Sapo": Inocencio's friend
- Alberto Catalá as Nicanor "El Güero": Inocencio's friend
- Guillermo Orea as El Comandante: Head of the Guanajuato police department
- Óscar Ortiz de Pinedo as Jesús López: Public notary
- Carlos Martínez Baena as Profesor: Inocencio's teacher
- Judy Ponte as Ofelia González: Rómulo's daughter
- María Teresa Rivas as Señora González: Rómulo's wife

== Reception ==
In his Concise Encyclopedia of Mexico, Michael S. Werner considered the film as the one that marked the start of Cantinflas's creative decline, saying, "If one were forced to pinpoint the exact film that marked the start of Cantinflas's creative decline, one might choose El analfabeto." He further elaborated, "There, his character is incarnated as an illiterate who works as a bank guard and eventually learns to read and write, thanks to Mexican public education. However, Cantinflas is not the schrewd, if ignorant, peladito of yore; rather, he is a quasi-retarded child-like simpleton who is easily tricked. Gone are the affronts towards the powerful that characterized his former movies: the bank's owner is good while his employees are bad, and the Catholic Church is fundamental to the illiterate's 'salvation'". In Cantinflas and the Chaos of Mexican Modernity, Professor Jeffrey M. Pilcher reached similar conclusions, saying, "A lack of artifice and sophistication had always been part of [Cantinflas's] wise fool character, but in El analfabeto, he no longer appeared wise, merely a fool", theorizing that Cantinflas "adopted the innocent simpleton" from his previous film Pepe "as the new identity for Cantinflas", and that in the film "the capitalist represented a benevolent guardian while the antagonist was a jealous fellow worker trying to sabotage his success." However, Pilcher also stated that "the movie featured Moreno's strongest supporting cast in decades", singling out Ángel Garasa, Carlos Martínez Baena and Sara García.

== DVD details ==
The film is available on DVD from Sony Pictures Entertainment, with Spanish audio and Spanish and English subtitles. This edition of the film is letterboxed and in widescreen format.

== Bibliography ==
- Rodríguez Terceño, José. La imagen de los docentes en el cine. Asociación Cultural y Científica Iberoamericana (ACCI), 2017.
- Amador, María Luisa; Ayala Blanco, Jorge. Cartelera cinematográfica, 1960–1969. UNAM, 1986.
- Werner, Michael S. Concise Encyclopedia of Mexico. Taylor & Francis, 2001.
- Pilcher, Jeffrey M. Cantinflas and the Chaos of Mexican Modernity. Rowman & Littlefield, 2001.
