= El señor doctor =

- Directed by: Miguel M. Delgado
- Written by: Miguel M. Delgado (screenplay); Carlos León (additional dialogue)
- Story by: Fernando Galiana
- Produced by: Jacques Gelman
- Starring: Mario Moreno «Cantinflas»; Marta Romero; Miguel Ángel Álvarez
- Cinematography: Rosalío Solano
- Edited by: Jorge Bustos
- Music by: Raúl Lavista
- Production company: Posa Films
- Distributed by: Columbia Pictures
- Release date: 7 October 1965 (Mexico)
- Running time: 113 minutes
- Country: Mexico
- Language: Spanish

El señor doctor (aka Mr. Doctor) is a 1965 Mexican comedy film directed by Miguel M. Delgado and starring Mario Moreno «Cantinflas»,Marta Romero and Miguel Ángel Álvarez.

This film is notorious due to its dramatic overtones, in contrast to the more picquaresque tint of Cantinflas' previous films.

== Plot ==
Salvador Medina (Cantinflas) is a country doctor who, finding many different technological advances in the medical field, and the need to adapt to said new technologies, moves to Mexico City to become an intern in the Medical Center of the Mexican Social Security Institute (IMSS).

Salvador immediately clashes with his superior and Head of Training at IMSS, Dr. Miguel Villanueva (Miguel Ángel Álvarez), while growing closer to Nurse Laura (Marta Romero) who, unbeknownst to him at first, is Dr. Villanueva's sister. In his medical activity at the hospital, Salvador serves various patients by raising their self-esteem and he is jokingly preferred to Dr. Kildare. In the case of an old lady patient (Prudencia Grifell) who feels very lonely and abandoned from her only relative, a grandson; as well as a patient who is almost completely bandaged (Ramón Valdés), and another one who cannot even feed himself (Guillermo Bravo Sosa).

Salvador meets Beto (Pepito Velázquez), an eight-year-old patient who has a brain tumor, which has grown enough to disturb his visibility. Salvador is moved by Beto's case and provides special attention, even though the case is under the responsibility of another doctor friend of Salvador, Dr. Montero (Tony Carbajal) who is a pediatrician. Beto's parents are separated, and their personal differences affect Beto's mood.

Beto's father (Wolf Ruvinski) in particular is opposed to having his son operated, on the grounds that he does not want medical experiments to be done with the child's health, even when surgery is the only way to save him. However, when Beto's situation becomes critical (as demonstrated when he completely loses his sight), Salvador decides to perform surgery against the wishes of Beto's father, risking his medical career.

Ultimately, Salvador is successful and Beto is on the way to recovery and, in addition, a new hospital is inaugurated in Salvador's hometown, which will remain under his direction. Beto's parents reconcile and apologize to Salvador, who in turn receives the acceptance of Dr. Villanueva and his sister Laura, who officially becomes Salvador's girlfriend.

== Cast ==
- Mario Moreno «Cantinflas» as Salvador Medina
- Marta Romero as Laura Villanueva
- Miguel Ángel Álvarez as Dr. Miguel Villanueva
- Prudencia Grifell as Patient, Isidro Martínez's grandmother
- Wolf Ruvinski as Beto's Father
- Guillermo Zetina as Dr. Marín
- Tony Carbajal as Dr. Pablo Montero
- Pepito Velázquez as Beto
- Carlos Riquelme as Hospital Administrator
- Rosa Elena Durgel as Beto's Mother
- Alberto Catalá as Ambidextrous Patient
- Consuelo Monteagudo as Mother-in-law of neurotic patient
- José Chávez as Isidro Martínez
- Paz Villegas as Flirty Old Lady Patient
- Ada Carrasco as Doña Lola
- Arturo Castro as Village Police Chief
- Guillermo Bravo Sosa as Malnourished Patient (uncredited)
- Margarita Delgado as Nurse (uncredited)
- Pedro Elviro as Patient with television (uncredited)
- Carmelita González as Neurotic Patient (uncredited)
- Benny Ibarra as Beatnik in canteen (uncredited)
- Alejandro Suárez as Beatnik in canteen (uncredited)
- Ramón Valdés as Bandaged Patient (uncredited)
- Jorge Zamora as Man in canteen (uncredited)
- Alfonso Zayas as Beatnik in canteen (uncredited)

== Bibliography ==
- Pinto Bustamante, Boris Julián; Gómez Córdoba, Ana Isabel. Cine, bioética y profesionalismo. Editorial Universidad del Rosario, 2018.
- León Frías, Isaac. Más allá de las lágrimas: Espacios habitables en el cine clásico de México y Argentina. Fondo Editorial Universidad de Lima, 2019.
