= El ministro y yo =

- Spanish VHS cover
- Directed by: Miguel M. Delgado
- Written by: Tito Davison (screenplay); Carlos León (additional dialogue)
- Story by: Mario Moreno «Cantinflas» Tito Davison
- Produced by: Jacques Gelman
- Starring: Mario Moreno «Cantinflas» Chela Castro; Ángel Garasa
- Cinematography: Jorge Stahl Jr.
- Edited by: Gloria Schoemann
- Music by: Gustavo César Carrión
- Distributed by: Columbia Pictures
- Release date: 1 July 1976 (Mexico)
- Running time: 109 minutes
- Country: Mexico
- Language: Spanish

El ministro y yo (Spanish: The Minister and I) is a 1976 Mexican comedy film directed by Miguel M. Delgado and starring Mario Moreno «Cantinflas», Chela Castro, Lucía Méndez and Ángel Garasa. This was the last film in which Cantinflas acted alongside Garasa.

== Plot ==
Mateo Melgarejo "Mateito" (Cantinflas) is a notary public and scribe for the illiterate people of Santo Domingo, a neighborhood north of Mexico City's Zócalo. A squatter friend asks for his help in negotiating with the land census bureau to regularize a land title. After a great deal of frustration with the government bureaucracy, he writes a letter to the cabinet minister, Don Antonio (Miguel Manzano), earning an audience with him. The minister is so pleased with Mateo's honesty that he hires him to reform the bureau. Mateo also ends up making friends with the minister's sister Vicky (Chela Castro) and the minister's daughter Bárbara (Lucía Méndez).

Mateo is initially appointed to work in the basement where the oldest archives of the offices are located, nicknamed "la ratonera" ("The Mousetrap"), alongside a kind elderly man, Avelino Romero, "Romeritos" (Ángel Garasa), but after the government official in charge of supervising the bureau (Raúl Padilla) realizes Mateo's connection with the minister, he places Mateo in charge of the bureau. However, after the minister is appointed as an ambassador overseas, Mateo is demoted again to the Mousetrap, this time alongside a younger, petulant employee (since Romeritos by then had retired). Mateo, tired of the multiple problems with his co-workers, resigns, but not before lecturing the officials on their duties in a democratic society. At the end, he returns to Santo Domingo to help its poor residents.

== Cast ==
- Mario Moreno «Cantinflas» as Mateo Melgarejo "Mateíto"
- Chela Castro as Vicky (as Celia Castro)
- Lucía Méndez as Bárbara
- Ángel Garasa as Avelino Romero "Romeritos"
- Manolita Saval as Estrellita
- Delia Peña Orta as María (as Niña Delia de la Peña)
- Alonso Castaño as Don Nachito
- Miguel Manzano as Don Antonio, minister
- Daniel "Chino" Herrera as Guest from Yucatán
- Raúl Padilla as Licenciado (as Raul Chato Padilla)
- Tamara Garina as Tamarita
- Alejandra Meyer as Julia Ramírez, Licenciado's secretary
- José Manuel Fregoso
- Pedro Damián (as Pedro Muñoz Romero)
- Judith Velasco as Anita
- Pedro de Aguillón as Alcalino Buenrostro
- Gastón Melo as Guest from Nuevo León
- Mónica Prado as Office employee
- Héctor Suárez as Office employee
- Manuel Alvarado as Fat Man (uncredited)
- Socorro Avelar as Lupita (uncredited)
- Carmen del Valle as Office employee (uncredited)
- Federico González as Complaint Department employee (uncredited)
- Rojo Grau as Spindola Jr. (uncredited)
- Cecilia Leger as Client (uncredited)
- Inés Murillo as Chonita, maid (uncredited)
- Rubén Márquez as Office employee (uncredited)
- Fernando Pinkus as Bureaucrat (uncredited)
- Marcelo Villamil as Office employee (uncredited)
- Fernando Yapur as Butler (uncredited)

== Bibliography ==
- García Riera, Emilio. Historia documental del cine mexicano: 1974–1976. Universidad de Guadalajara, 1992.
