= Seki Sano =

Japanese actor, stage director and choreographer

Seki Sano (佐野 碩, Sano Seki; January 14, 1905, Tianjin – September 29, 1966, Mexico City) was a Japanese actor, stage director, and choreographer. He contributed to the development of the theatre in Japan and later in Mexico, where he was known as the "father of Mexican theatre". He influenced numerous directors and actors both in Mexico and in Latin America. He was also a Marxist activist, known for being the Japanese translator of the socialist anthem The Internationale.
