= Chino Herrera =

Mexican actor

- Born: Héctor Daniel Herrera Bates; 3 January 1903; Mérida, Yucatán, Mexico
- Died: 29 September 1983 (aged 80); Mexico City, Mexico
- Occupations: Actor, comedian

Héctor Daniel Herrera Bates (3 January 1903 – 29 September 1983), known as Chino Herrera, was a Mexican actor and comedian. He performed for radio, television, film and theater in Mexico for over 60 years.

== Biography ==
The son of theatrical actor Héctor Herrera, he was nicknamed "Chino" ("the Chinese one") due to his facial features resembling that of Chinese people. He debuted as an actor in the vernacular comedy theater with his father in his hometown of Mérida, Yucatán.

He ventured into Mexican cinema during the so-called Golden Age of Mexican cinema in the late 1930s. Later he also worked with great success in Mexican television for Telesistema Mexicano on the then-Channel 2, XEW-TV (now Las Estrellas) owned by Emilio Azcárraga Vidaurreta. In 1959 he worked on renowned programs such as Estudio Raleigh next to Paco Malgesto and Pedro Vargas. He also worked in the programs Carta blanca and Noches tapatías on the XEW-AM radio station in Mexico.

He came to have his own television program called Martes de 21:30 ("Tuesday from 9:30 pm"). He also participated in Las estrellas y usted, a Mexican television program of the 1960s, alternating hosting duties with Susana Salvat and Francisco Avitia.

== Selected filmography ==
Among others, Herrera starred in the films:

- El rosario de Amozoc (1938)
- The Unknown Policeman (1941)
- I Am a Fugitive (1946)
- Fly Away, Young Man! (1947)
- El bolero de Raquel (1956)
- Los muertos no hablan (1958)
- Ay... Calypso no te rajes! (1958)
- Los pistolocos (1960)
- El analfabeto (1961)
- El lobo blanco (1962)
- La muerte es puntual (1967)
- Un Yucateco honoris causa (1967)
- La Gata (1970)
- Magdalena (1970, telenovela)
- El ministro y yo (1976)
