= El bolero de Raquel =

- Directed by: Miguel M. Delgado
- Written by: Jaime Salvador (adaptation and dialogue); Miguel M. Delgado (technical screenplay)
- Story by: Daniel Jiménez
- Starring: Mario Moreno «Cantinflas»; Manola Saavedra; Flor Silvestre
- Cinematography: Gabriel Figueroa
- Edited by: Jorge Bustos
- Music by: Raúl Lavista
- Production company: Posa Films
- Distributed by: Columbia Pictures (1957 worldwide theatrical release); Columbia TriStar Home Entertainment (2003 U.S. DVD release)
- Release date: 9 October 1957
- Running time: 101 minutes
- Country: Mexico
- Language: Spanish

El bolero de Raquel (aka Raquel's Shoeshiner) is a 1957 Mexican comedy film directed by Miguel M. Delgado and starring Mario Moreno «Cantinflas», Manola Saavedra, Flor Silvestre, and child actor Paquito Fernández. The film's art direction was by Gunther Gerszo.

This is Cantinflas' first color film (it filmed in Eastmancolor, also considered as Mexico's Technicolor).

== Plot ==
Cantinflas is a down on his luck but affable and witty shoeshiner that learns that his compadre has died in an accident. His friend's widow, Leonor (Flor Silvestre) is unable to support her child, Chavita, so she leaves the kid with Cantinflas so she can go to Guadalajara, Jalisco in order to seek help from her parents. In the first days, Cantinflas goes to work in Chapultepec and Chavita catches a ball that some other children are playing with, with Cantinflas arguing with the child owner's nanny over the ball. Cantinflas calms down Chavita by promising he will bring him a new ball.

In order to find a better job, Cantinflas goes to school, where he tries to learn but, instead, becomes smitten with Raquel (Manola Saavedra), an attractive teacher who works there. While in school, he tries finding more jobs, with comic results: first, as a shoe shiner in a night club, where he gets into various incidents on his first night, including an unexpected entrance in the dancers' dressing room and an accidental entrance to Ravel's Boléro dance act performed by Elaine Bruce (from which the pun in the Spanish title is drawn, as he confuses the name of the piece, Boléro, with the name with which shoeshiners are known in Mexico, bolero, thus thinking that the dance is for him). After sabotaging the act, Cantinflas is removed from the night club.

Cantinflas tries his luck in Acapulco, where he tries everything to get some money. Chavita leaves Cantinflas to climb La Quebrada. Cantinflas scolds Chavita and goes off to rescue him. He is stuck himself at the top of La Quebrada (as Chavita escapes easily to the other side) and he is obliged to make a spectacular dive. His action leads him to be offered a job as a lifeguard, but his incompetence and lack of responsibility when attempting to save a large woman from drowning (almost drowning himself in the process) causes him to be fired the same day.

Finally, Cantinflas gets enough money to raise his godson and buys him a ravishing big ball. Leonor then appears again with her fiancé, the prospect of a better life and another ball. Leonor asks for Chavita back while unconsciously humiliating Cantinflas, thus his refusal to be a witness to the wedding. They leave with Chavita asking Cantinflas to visit them, and he sadly ponders with the ball. A short time later, he encounters Raquel in a park, telling her about the void left by Chavita. She eventually declares her love for Cantinflas and he gleefully kicks a ball, hitting a policeman guarding the park; after that, he and Raquel kiss each other. The policeman looks at them smiling watching them happily stay together. Cantinflas offers to shine the policeman's shoes, but not before sharing another kiss with Raquel.

== Cast ==
- Mario Moreno as Cantinflas, he having enjoyed success in Around the World in Eighty Days, which earned him a Golden Globe Award, returns to Mexico to star in this film.
- Manola Saavedra as Raquel, Saavedra was a Spanish expatriate who marks her film debut in this film.
- Flor Silvestre as Leonor, Silvestre had already been working on films since her debut in 1950 and later continues to star in the Oscar-nominated film Animas Trujano, but was also continuing her musical career which she had previously initiated in 1943. Unlike other singers at the time, Silvestre also found a profession as an actress in film until her last appearance in 1991.
- Paquito Fernández as Chavita, Paquito had appeared in film in 1955, and later continues as a child actor until 1962.
- Daniel Herrera as Edelmiro
- Mario Sevilla
- Alberto Catalá
- Roberto Meyer
- Elaine Bruce as Mimí
- Leonor Gómez as Maid in park
- Erika Carlsson (uncredited)
- Roberto Corell (uncredited)
- Pedro Elviro (uncredited)
- Pablo Ferrel (uncredited)
- Lidia Franco (uncredited)
- Elodia Hernández (uncredited)
- Carlos León (uncredited)
- Dina de León (uncredited)
- Salvador Lozano (uncredited)
- Casimiro Ortega as Foreman (uncredited)
- Manuel Trejo Morales (uncredited)
- Guillermo Álvarez Bianchi as Fat Tourist (uncredited)

== Reception ==
=== Box office ===
Though a relative box office disappointment for a Cantinflas film, it still ranked among the most profitable Mexican films of the year.

== Awards ==
Child actor Paquito Fernández was nominated for a 1958 Silver Ariel for Best Performance by a Child Actor for the role of Chavita.
