= Por mis pistolas (1968 film) =

Mexican comedy western film

- Directed by: Miguel M. Delgado
- Written by: Marco Antonio Almazan; Mario Moreno «Cantinflas»
- Produced by: Jacques Gelman
- Starring: Mario Moreno «Cantinflas» Isela Vega
- Cinematography: José Ortiz Ramos
- Edited by: Carlos Savage
- Music by: Sergio Guerrero
- Production company: Posa Films
- Distributed by: Columbia Pictures (USA)
- Release date: 21 August 1968 (Mexico)
- Running time: 123 minutes
- Country: Mexico
- Language: Spanish

Por mis pistolas (aka With My Guns) is a 1968 Mexican comedy Western film directed by Miguel M. Delgado and starring Mario Moreno "Cantinflas" and Isela Vega. Vega's film career took off after this film. The film is a satire of the Spaghetti Western genre in vogue in the late 1960s.

== Plot ==
Fidencio Barrenillo (Cantinflas) is an apothecary from a Northern Mexican border town in Sonora who discovers the property deeds of an old silver mine in Arizona, La Veladora, belonging to his great-great-grandfather. Since the mine has been considered lost after it collapsed, Fidencio decides to head to Arizona to find it and claim his property. On the way he is captured by a tribe of Apaches and is about to be burned alive, but High Chief Caballo Recostado (Manuel Vergara) stops the burning ceremony since he has a toothache. Fidencio learns about this and offers to heal the Chief. He succeeds in pulling out the bad tooth, earning him the eternal friendship of the Apache Chief, who teaches Fidencio how to make smoke signals.

After saying goodbye to the Apaches, Fidencio continues on his way to the ranch of his relatives, the Sánchez. In the nearby town of Hot Dog Springs, he stays at the saloon of Pat O'Connor (Jorge Rado), who controls the town through the terror imposed by a gang of gunmen he has at his command. Thanks to the fact that his room is next to O'Connor's girlfriend, Fidencio learns that they plan to attack his relatives' ranch, and together with the town sheriff (John Kelly) he heads to their ranch to warn them.

Fidencio meets the Sánchez; his uncle Don Serapio (Manuel Alvarado), and the latter's sons and Fidencio's cousins, Pedro (Gregorio Casal), Pablo (Alfonso Mejía) and Lupita (Isela Vega), who welcome him and plan the defense of the ranch with weapons, but Fidencio comes up with another plan: he gives a powerful laxative to the gang under the guise of a friendly toast, thus preventing the assault. The following day, Fidencio, Pedro, and Pablo get into a fight with most of the gang members, which they win. Soon after, Fidencio defeats O'Connor's fierce lead enforcer Frank (Carlos Cardán) in a duel.

O'Connor's girlfriend discovers Fidencio's connection to the Sánchez as well as his quest for "La Veladora", and informs O'Connor. Seeking revenge, O'Connor assembles the gang and they head out to kill the group as they dig for the mine. Overwhelmed, Fidencio and Lupita send smoke signals asking the Apaches for help. Caballo Recostado and his Apaches make their appearance and defeat the thugs, who are all arrested. Fidencio then shows a piece of ore he found while digging, which is revealed to be silver. Overjoyed that he found the mine, Fidencio begins to plan his claim, and the film ends with him, the Sánchez, the Apaches, and the rest of the town holding a celebration party at the saloon.

== Cast ==
- Mario Moreno «Cantinflas» as Fidencio Barrenillo
- Isela Vega as Lupita Sánchez
- Gloria Coral as Winona
- Quintín Bulnes as Tommy Bernard
- Rhea Frichina as Katie (credited as Rhea)
- Carlos Cardán as Frank
- Ivan J. Rado as Pat O'Connor (credited as Jorge Rado)
- Alfonso Mejía as Pablo Sánchez
- Manuel Alvarado como Don Serapio Sánchez
- John Kelly as Sheriff Jim
- Eduardo Alcaraz as Don Chuchito
- Pedro Galván
- Agustín Isunza as Don Pánfilo
- Carlos Pouliot as Border Agent
- Manuel Vergara as High Chief Caballo Recostado (as Manver)
- Angelita Castagni
- Arturo Castro
- José Torvay
- Gregorio Casal as Pedro Sánchez (credited as Jesus Casillas)
- Ricardo Carrión as Willy
- Héctor Carrión as Jimmy
- Farnesio de Bernal as Barman
- Ramón Menéndez as Johnny
- Alberto Catalá as Pianist
- Ramiro Orci as Villain
- Arturo Silva
- José Loza
- Julio Martínez
- Salvador Lozano
- Juan Garza as Gunman

== Bibliography ==
- González, Rafael. 60 años de rock mexicano: 1956-1979, Volumen 1. Penguin Random House Grupo Editorial México, 2018.
- Láscaris Comneno, Constantino. Cien casos perdidos. Studium Generale Costarricense, 1984.
- Pilcher, Jeffrey M. Cantinflas and the Chaos of Mexican Modernity. Rowman & Littlefield, 2001.
