= Adventures of Casanova =

1948 film

- Directed by: Roberto Gavaldón
- Written by: Crane Wilbur; Walter Bullock; Karen DeWolf
- Produced by: Bryan Foy; Leonard S. Picker
- Starring: Arturo de Córdova; Lucille Bremer; Turhan Bey
- Cinematography: Jack Greenhalgh
- Edited by: Louis Sackin
- Music by: Hugo Friedhofer
- Production company: Bryan Foy Productions
- Distributed by: Eagle-Lion Films
- Release date: 7 February 1948
- Running time: 83 minutes
- Countries: Mexico; United States
- Language: English

Adventures of Casanova is a 1948 American-Mexican historical adventure film directed by Roberto Gavaldón and starring Arturo de Córdova, Lucille Bremer, and Turhan Bey. It portrays a fictional version of the story of Casanova, and was supposedly intended to capitalize off of the Errol Flynn film The Adventures of Don Juan (although the latter film was actually released later that same year after a long production process). The film's sets were designed by the art directors Jorge Fernandez and Alfred Ybarra.

== Synopsis ==
It is set in Sicily in the 1790s, with Casanova as a freedom fighter battling against the King's local governor Count de Brissac, who unknown to the monarch, is acting as a tyrant.

== Cast ==
- Arturo de Córdova as Casanova
- Lucille Bremer as Lady Bianca
- Turhan Bey as Lorenzo
- John Sutton as Count de Brissac
- George Tobias as Jacopo
- Noreen Nash as Zanetta
- Lloyd Corrigan as D'Albernasi
- Fritz Leiber as D'Anneci
- Nestor Paiva as Prefecture police
- Jorge Trevino as Angelino
- Clifford Carr as Salvatore
- Jacqueline Dalya as Lady Adria
- Miroslava as Cassandra's sister
- Rafael Alcayde as Cassandra's brother-in-law
- Jacqueline Evans as Cassandra
- Leonor Gómez as Woman in crowd
- Chel López as Jailer
- Rita Macedo as Bruntilla, maid
- Charles Rooner as Palace guard
- Fanny Schiller as Woman who complains in crowd
- Fernando Wagner as Assassinated commander

== Bibliography ==
- Richards, Jeffrey. Swordsmen of the Screen: From Douglas Fairbanks to Michael York. Routledge, 2014.
