= Miguel M. Delgado =

Mexican film director

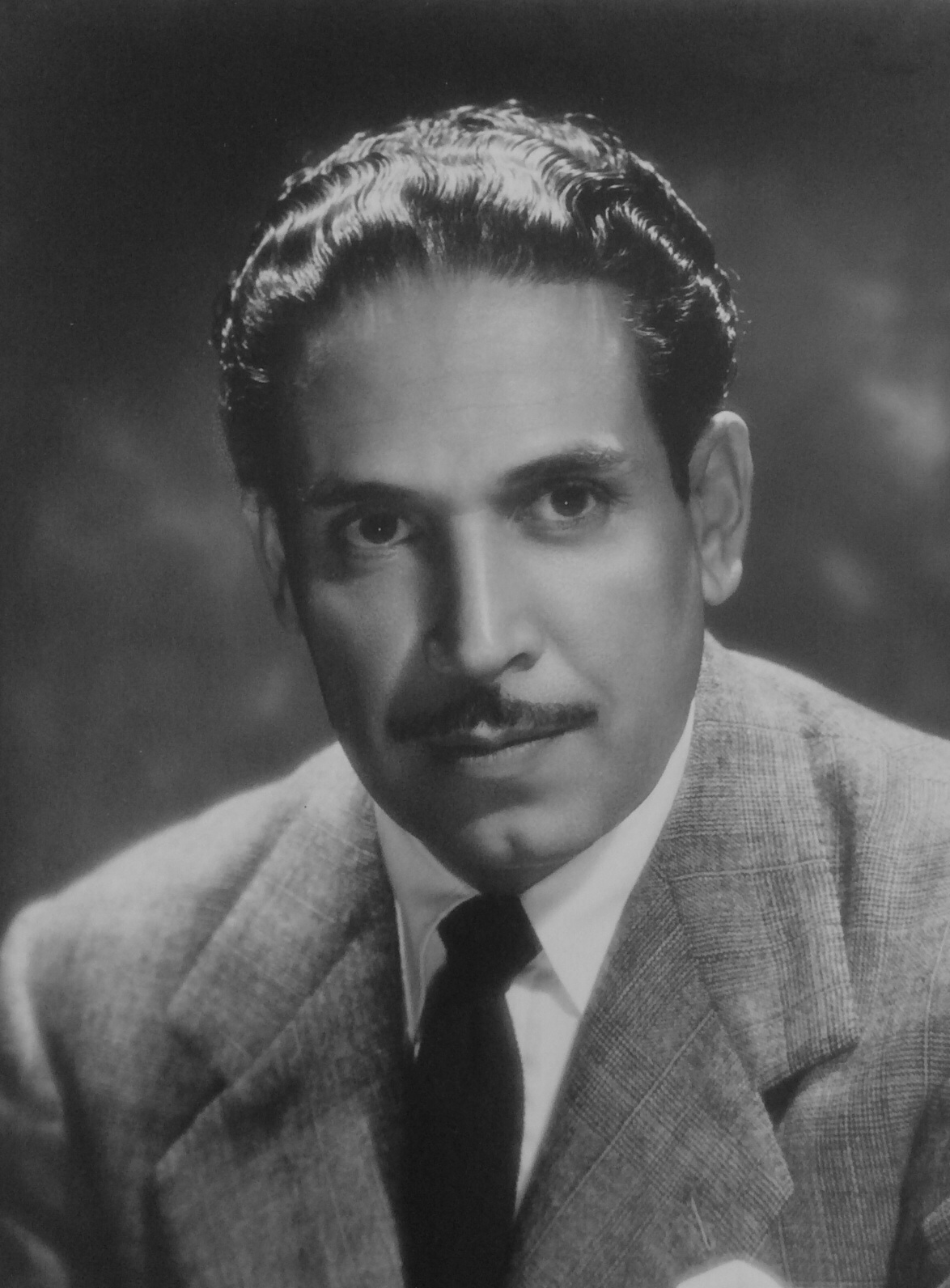
- Born: Miguel Melitón Delgado Pardavé; 17 May 1905; Mexico City, Mexico
- Died: 2 January 1994 (aged 88)
- Occupations: Film director, screenwriter
- Years active: 1941–1990

Miguel Melitón Delgado Pardavé (17 May 1905 – 2 January 1994) was a Mexican film director and screenwriter best known for directing thirty-three of Cantinflas' films, under contract of Posa Films. He directed 139 films between 1941 and 1990. His film The Three Musketeers was entered into the 1946 Cannes Film Festival.

== Selected filmography ==
- The Unknown Policeman (1941)
- The Three Musketeers (1942)
- Doña Bárbara (1943)
- El secreto de la solterona (1944)
- Gran Hotel (1944)
- Michael Strogoff (1944)
- A Day with the Devil (1945)
- I Am a Fugitive (1946)
- Fly Away, Young Man! (1947)
- The Genius (1948)
- The Magician (1949)
- She and I (1951)
- The Atomic Fireman (1952)
- The Border Man (1952)
- The Photographer (1953)
- Your Memory and Me (1953)
- The Sixth Race (1953)
- A Tailored Gentleman (1954)
- Drop the Curtain (1955)
- Las Viudas del Cha Cha Cha (1955)
- El bolero de Raquel (1957)
- Sube y baja (1959)
- The Illiterate One (1961)
- The Extra (1962)
- Immediate Delivery (1963)
- El padrecito (1964)
- El señor doctor (1965)
- Su Excelencia (1967)
- Por mis pistolas (1968)
- Un Quijote sin mancha (1969)
- El profe (1971)
- Conserje en condominio (1973)
- Bellas de noche (1975)
- El ministro y yo (1976)
- El patrullero 777 (1978)
- El barrendero (1982)
