= Fly Away, Young Man! =

- Directed by: Miguel M. Delgado
- Written by: Miguel M. Delgado; Jaime Salvador
- Story by: Paul Colline (story "Adémaï aviateur")
- Produced by: Jacques Gelman; Santiago Reachi
- Starring: Mario Moreno «Cantinflas» Miroslava Stern
- Cinematography: Jack Draper
- Edited by: Jorge Bustos
- Music by: Gonzalo Curiel
- Production company: Posa Films
- Distributed by: Columbia Pictures
- Release date: 25 December 1947
- Running time: 113 min
- Country: Mexico
- Language: Spanish

Fly Away, Young Man! (Spanish: ¡A volar joven!) is a 1947 Mexican comedy film directed by Miguel M. Delgado and starring Mario Moreno «Cantinflas» and Miroslava Stern. It was produced by Posa Films and distributed internationally by Columbia Pictures.

== Cast ==
- Mario Moreno as Cantinflas
- Ángel Garasa as Repelas
- Chino Herrera as Sargento
- Andrés Soler as Don Lupe Chávez
- Carolina Barret as Margarita
- Julio Villarreal as Coronel
- Maruja Grifell as Doña Encarna
- Francisco Jambrina as Capitán
- Roberto Cañedo as Soldado
- Manuel Trejo Morales as Soldado
- Estanislao Schillinsky as Oficial
- Miroslava Stern as María Chávez
- Ramiro Gamboa «Tio Gamboin» as Reportero radiofónico
- Armando Arriola as Soldado (uncredited)
- Joaquín Cordero as Soldado mensajero (uncredited)
- Pedro Elviro as Periodista (uncredited)
- Edmundo Espino as Redactor de periódico (uncredited)
- Rafael Icardo as Juez del registro civil (uncredited)
- Chel López as Oficial (uncredited)
- Manuel Noriega as Doctor (uncredited)

== Bibliography ==
- Hershfield, Joanne; Maciel, David R. Mexico's Cinema: A Century of Film and Filmmakers. Rowman & Littlefield Publishers, 1999.
- Couret, Nilo. Mock Classicism: Latin American Film Comedy, 1930–1960. University of California Press, 2018.
