= The Atomic Fireman =

1952 film

- Directed by: Miguel M. Delgado
- Written by: Mario Moreno «Cantinflas»; Miguel M. Delgado; Carlos León; Jaime Salvador
- Starring: Mario Moreno «Cantinflas»; Elisa Quintanilla
- Cinematography: Jack Draper
- Edited by: Jorge Busto
- Music by: Raúl Lavista
- Production company: Posa Films
- Release date: 10 September 1952
- Running time: 95 minutes
- Country: Mexico
- Language: Spanish

The Atomic Fireman (Spanish: El bombero atómico) is a 1952 Mexican comedy film directed by Miguel M. Delgado and starring Mario Moreno «Cantinflas» and Elisa Quintanilla. The film's art direction was by Gunther Gerszo.

== Plot ==
An elderly man who abandoned his wife and child lies in bed and dictates his will and testament. He owns a jungle with an oil deposit and desires that all of it be put under the ownership of his daughter, to realize his dream of making her rich.

On the same day, the girl, Rosario, watches her mother die. The mother sends her to her father's last known address along with a letter in which she explains her situation and mentions her deceased friend, Silverio.

At that address lives Cantinflas, a newspaper deliveryman, which pays poorly. One of his customers is the local fire station, and he becomes acquainted with its manager. The girl arrives at his house. Accepting to be her father, he agrees to enter the fire company to support her. Cantinflas does horribly during physical training and provides non sequitur answers during oral exams, but is nevertheless given the job due to his connections with the manager.

When sent to put out a fire, he first gets dizzy when driving, then plugs the fire hose into a garden hose, rescues dolls instead of children, and sits in during the residents' card game instead of evacuating them.

However, while putting out the fire, he reunites with the brother of his former police chief, Commander Bravo, revealing that he was previously a member of said police force and had retired. He proposes an offer with certain benefits including life insurance and immediately appoints him Commander in Chief of the police delegation.

After leaving the fire department and rejoining the police force, he assigns officers in the neighborhood of San Camilito, where dangerous criminal gangs reside. They immediately get into fights with the policemen.

Rosario is kidnapped, causing him to strengthen his resolve and strategies. He dons a fake mustache and dresses undercover then goes to a local bar where many of the criminal gang leaders are. Several drinks later, the leaders are all drunk and begin to divulge information about both their criminal conspiracy and the whereabouts of the girl. Additional problems arise when Cantinflas dances with some of the women in the bar.

Reaching the safe house, Cantinflas finds a much older girl who they were using as a decoy to distract the police and eventually obtain access to her inherited riches.

Cantinflas then commands his entire police force to raid the bars, then beat up and arrest everyone in them. He reaches Rosario and they embrace.

Cantinflas formally adopts Rosario, and is honored with a merit cross.

== Cast ==
- Mario Moreno as Cantinflas / Agente 777
- Roberto Soto as Comandante Bravo
- Gilberto González as El Piquete
- Elisa Quintanilla as Rosario
- Miguel Manzano as Jefe bomberos
- Pascual García Peña as El Chueco
- Ernesto Finance as Licenciado / notario
- Jorge Mondragon as Silverio
- Eduardo Alcaraz as Sargento Policía
- Ángel Infante as Policía
- Pedro Elviro as Secretario (uncredited)
- Conchita Gentil Arcos as Vecina de Guadalupe (uncredited)
- María Gentil Arcos as Doña Cleofas (uncredited)
- Salvador Quiroz as Comandante Cienfuegos (uncredited)
- Lily Aclemar as Sra. del comandante Bravo (uncredited)
- Daniel Arroyo as Hombre entre multitud (uncredited)
- Stephen Berne asHombre en cantina (uncredited)
- Enrique Carrillo as Bombero (uncredited)
- José Chávez as Policía (uncredited)
- María Luisa Cortés as La tosferina (uncredited)
- Enrique del Castillo as Policía (uncredited)
- José Luis Fernández as Hombre que baila en cabaret (uncredited)
- Rogelio Fernández as Esbirro de El Piquete (uncredited)
- Lidia Franco as Doña Guadalupe (uncredited)
- Pedro Ibarra as Dueño de La Motivosa (uncredited)
- Margarito Luna as Esbirro de El Piquete (uncredited)
- Carmen Manzano as Mamá de Rosario (uncredited)
- Álvaro Matute as Jugador de cartas (uncredited)
- Kika Meyer as La soplona (uncredited)
- Bruno Márquez as Policía (uncredited)
- Luz María Núñez as La Motivosa (uncredited)
- Casimiro Ortega as Cantinero (uncredited)
- Ramón Pandal as Luciano Tronquete, el influyente (uncredited)
- Ignacio Peón as Juez (uncredited)
- Carlos Valadez as El Chueco (uncredited)

== Bibliography ==
- Ilan Stavans. The Riddle of Cantinflas: Essays on Hispanic Popular Culture, Revised and Expanded Edition. UNM Press, 2012.
