= Cantinflas =

Mexican actor and filmmaker (1911–1993)

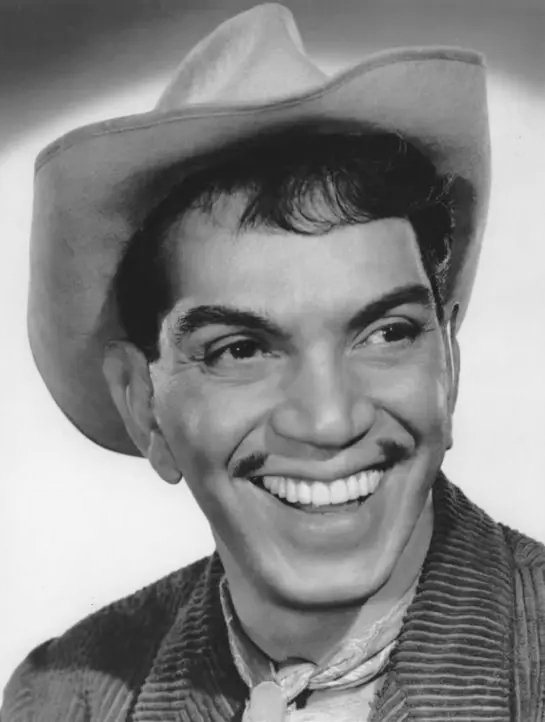
- Cantinflas in 1967
- Born: Mario Fortino Alfonso Moreno Reyes; 12 August 1911; Santa María la Redonda, Mexico City, Mexico
- Died: 20 April 1993 (aged 81); Mexico City, Mexico
- Burial place: Panteón Español, Mexico City, Mexico
- Other name: Mario Moreno
- Education: Instituto Politecnico Nacional Chapingo Autonomous University (Agronomy, few months)
- Occupations: Comedian; actor; screenwriter; film producer; singer; director
- Years active: 1937–1993
- Political party: Institutional Revolutionary Party
- Spouse: Valentina Ivanova Zubareff (m. 1936; died 1966)
- Children: Mario Arturo Moreno

Mario Fortino Alfonso Moreno Reyes (12 August 1911 – 20 April 1993), known by the stage name Cantinflas (Spanish pronunciation: [kanˈtiɱflas]), was a Mexican comedian, actor, and filmmaker. He is considered to have been the most widely accomplished Mexican comedian and is well known throughout Latin America and Spain. His humor, loaded with Mexican linguistic features of intonation, vocabulary, and syntax, is beloved in all the Spanish-speaking countries of Latin America and in Spain. His abilities gave rise to a range of expressions based on his stage name, including: cantinflear, cantinflada, cantinflesco, cantifleando and cantinflero.

He often portrayed impoverished farmers or peasants of pelado origin. The character allowed Cantinflas to establish a long, successful film career into Hollywood. Charlie Chaplin once commented that he was the best comedian alive, and Moreno has been referred to as the "Charlie Chaplin of Mexico". To audiences in most of the world, he is best remembered as co-starring with David Niven in the Oscar-winning film Around the World in 80 Days, for which Moreno won a Golden Globe Award for Best Actor – Motion Picture Musical or Comedy.

As a pioneer of the cinema of Mexico, Moreno helped usher in its golden era. In addition to being a business leader, he also became involved in Mexico's complex labor politics. His reputation as a spokesperson for the working class gave his actions authenticity and became important in the early struggle against charrismo, the ruling PRI's practice of co-opting and controlling trade unions. Moreover, his character Cantinflas, whose identity became enmeshed with his own, was examined by media critics, philosophers, and linguists, who saw him variously as a danger to Mexican society, a bourgeois puppet, a verbal innovator, and a picaresque underdog.

== Early and personal life ==
Mario Fortino Alfonso Moreno Reyes was born in Santa María la Redonda neighborhood of Mexico City, then grew up in Tepito. He was one of eight children born to Pedro Moreno Esquivel, an impoverished mail carrier, and María de la Soledad Reyes Guízar (from Cotija, Michoacán). Moreno's mother, Soledad Reyes, came from an affluent family, but was disinherited when she married Pedro Moreno. The other children were Pedro, José ("Pepe"), Eduardo, Esperanza, Catalina, Enrique, and Roberto.

He married Valentina Ivanova Zubareff, of Russian ethnicity, on 27 October 1936 and remained with her until her death in January 1966. A son was born to Moreno in 1961 by another woman; the child was adopted by Valentina Ivanova and was named Mario Arturo Moreno Ivanova, causing some references to erroneously refer to him as "Cantinflas' adopted son". Moreno Ivanova died on 15 May 2017, of a presumed heart attack.

Moreno served as president of one of the Mexican actors' guilds known as Asociación Nacional de Actores (ANDA, "National Association of Actors") and as first secretary general of the independent filmworkers' union Sindicato de Trabajadores de la Producción Cinematográfica (STPC). Following his retirement, he devoted his life to helping others through charity and humanitarian organizations, especially those dedicated to helping children. His contributions to the Roman Catholic Church and orphanages made him a folk hero in Mexico.

He was a Freemason, initiated at Chilam Balam Lodge.

In 1961, Cantinflas appeared with U.S. Vice President Lyndon B. Johnson at shopping centers and supermarkets in San Antonio, Texas, to support the successful Democratic nominee to the United States House of Representatives for Texas's 20th congressional district, Henry B. Gonzalez, who defeated his Republican challenger, John W. Goode. Gonzalez was the first Hispanic elected to the Texas State Senate and as a U.S. congressman from Texas.

== Origin of name ==
As a young man, Cantinflas performed a variety of acts in travelling tents, and it was here that he acquired the nickname "Cantinflas". According to one obituary, "Cantinflas" is a meaningless name invented to prevent his parents from knowing he was in the entertainment business, which they considered a shameful occupation. Cantinflas confirmed this in 1992 in his last television interview.

== Entertainment career ==
Before starting his professional life in entertainment, he explored a number of possible careers, such as medicine and professional boxing, before joining the entertainment world as a dancer. By 1930 he was involved in Mexico City's carpa (travelling tent) circuit, performing in succession with the Ofelia, Sotelo of Azcapotzalco, and finally the Valentina carpa, where he met his future wife. At first he tried to imitate Al Jolson's use of blackface, but later separated himself to form his own identity as an impoverished slum dweller with baggy pants, a rope for a belt, and a distinctive mustache. In the tents, he danced, performed acrobatics, and performed roles related to several different professions.

=== Film career ===
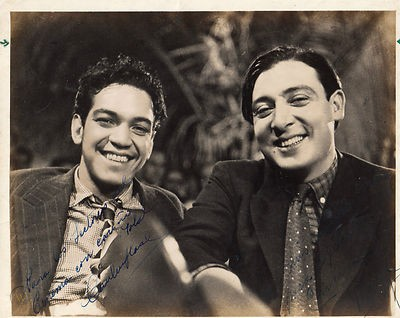
Cantinflas (left) with Manuel Medel, c. 1938

In the mid-1930s, Cantinflas met publicist and producer Santiago Reachi and subsequently partnered with him to form their own film production venture. Reachi produced, directed, and distributed, while Cantinflas acted. Cantinflas made his film debut in 1936 with No te engañes corazón (Don't Fool Yourself Dear) before meeting Reachi, but the film received little attention. Reachi established Posa Films in 1939 with two partners: Cantinflas and Fernandez. Before this, Reachi produced short films that allowed him to develop the Cantinflas character, but it was in 1940 that he finally became a movie star, after shooting Ahí está el detalle ("There's the rub", literally "There lies the detail"), with Sofía Álvarez, Joaquín Pardavé, Sara García, and Dolores Camarillo. The phrase that gave that movie its name became a "Cantinflas" (or catchphrase) for the remainder of his career. The film was a breakthrough in Latin America and was later recognized by Somos magazine as the 10th greatest film produced largely in Mexico.

In 1941, Moreno first played the role of a police officer on film in El gendarme desconocido ("The Unknown Police Officer" a play on words on "The Unknown Soldier). By this time, he had sufficiently distinguished the peladito character from the 1920s-era pelado, and his character flowed comfortably from the disenfranchised, marginalized, underclassman to the empowered public servant. The rhetoric of cantinflismo facilitated this fluidity. He would reprise the role of Agent 777 and be honored by police forces throughout Latin America for his positive portrayal of law enforcement.

Ni sangre, ni arena ("Neither Blood, nor Sand" a play on words on the bullfighter/gladiator phrase Blood and Sand), the 1941 bullfighting film, broke box-office records for Mexican-made films throughout Spanish-speaking countries. In 1942, Moreno teamed up with Reachi, Miguel M. Delgado, and Jaime Salvador to produce a series of parodies, including El Circo, an interpretation of Chaplin's The Circus.

The 1940s and 1950s were Cantinflas' heyday. In 1941, Reachi, the Producer rejected Mexican Studios companies and instead paid Columbia Pictures to produce the films in its Studios in Hollywood. By this time, Cantinflas' popularity was such that he was able to lend his prestige to the cause of Mexican labor, representing the National Association of Actors in talks with Mexican President Manuel Ávila Camacho. The talks did not go well, however, and, in the resulting scandal, Moreno took his act back to the theatre.

== Theater ==
On 30 August 1953, Cantinflas began performing his theatrical work Yo Colón ("I, Columbus") in the Teatro de los Insurgentes, the same theatre that had earlier been embroiled in a controversy over a Diego Rivera mural incorporating Cantinflas and the Virgin of Guadalupe. Critics, including the very conservative political party PAN and archbishop Luis María Martínez, called the mural blasphemous, and it was eventually painted without the image of the Virgin.

Yo Colón placed Cantinflas in the character of Christopher Columbus, who, while continually "discovering America", made comedic historical and contemporary observations from fresh perspectives. For the first few months, he persuaded the King and Queen of Spain to fund his voyage so that he could let his wife "drive" so she could make a wrong turn and discover Mexico instead, allowing him to also discover Jorge Negrete so that the Queen – an ardent fan – could meet him. When Negrete died just before Christmas of 1953, he changed it first to Pedro Infante until his death four years later, and then finally to Javier Solis until his death in 1966.

== Hollywood and beyond ==
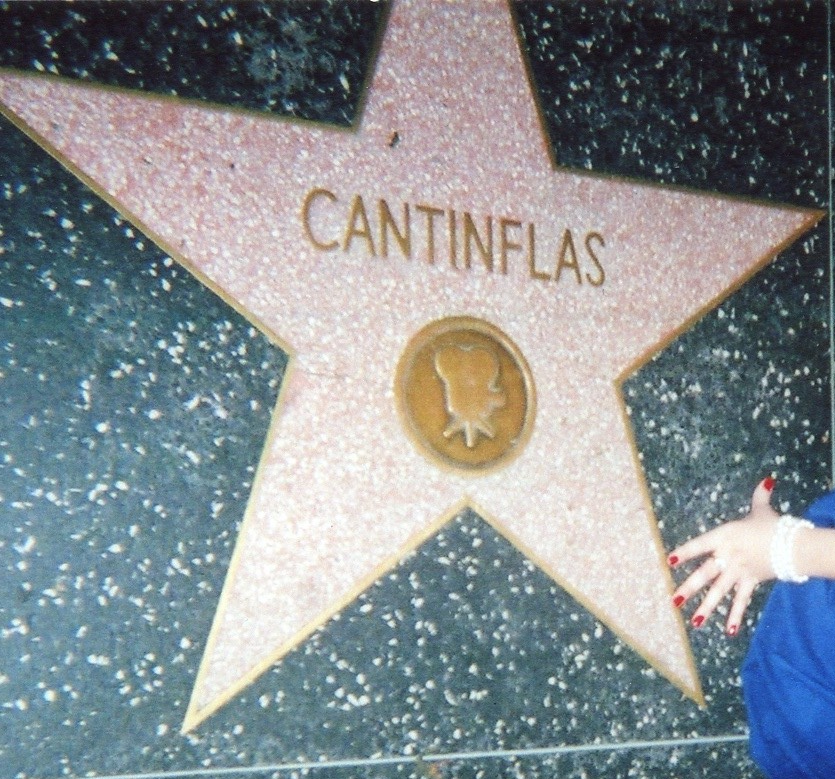
Cantinflas' star on the Hollywood Walk of Fame in Los Angeles

In 1956, Around the World in 80 Days, Cantinflas' American debut, earned him a Golden Globe for Best Actor in a musical or comedy. Variety magazine said in 1956 that his Chaplinesque quality made a big contribution to the success of the film. The film ultimately made an unadjusted $42 million at the box office (over $678 million in 2018 dollars). While David Niven was billed as the lead in English-speaking nations, Cantinflas was billed as the lead elsewhere. As a result of the film, Cantinflas became the world's highest-paid actor.

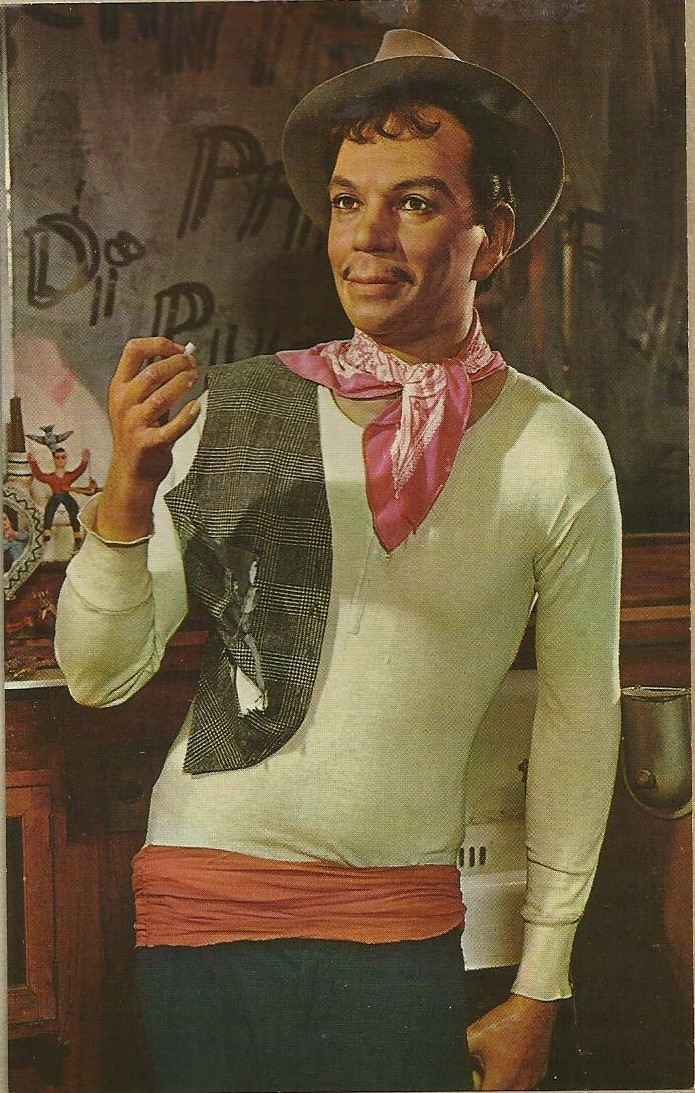
A postcard of Cantinflas as Pepe

Moreno's second Hollywood feature, Pepe, attempted to replicate the success of his first. The film had cameo appearances by Frank Sinatra, Judy Garland, Maurice Chevalier, Shirley Jones, Ricardo Montalbán, James Coburn, Debbie Reynolds, César Romero, and other stars. His humor, deeply rooted in the Spanish language, did not translate well for the American audience and the movie's reception was a failure. He still earned a Golden Globe nomination for his part. Later in a 1992 American interview, Moreno cited the language barrier as the biggest impediment to his making it big in the United States.

After returning to Mexico, Cantinflas starred in the comic drama El bolero de Raquel (1957), the first Cantinflas film to be distributed to the United States by Columbia Pictures. The film was followed by more Cantinflas-Reachi-Columbia productions: El analfabeto (1961), El padrecito (1963), and Su excelencia (1967). After Su excelencia, Cantinflas began to appear in a series of very low-budget comedies directed by Miguel M. Delgado, which were produced by his own company "Cantinflas Films". These films lasted until El Barrendero, in 1982.

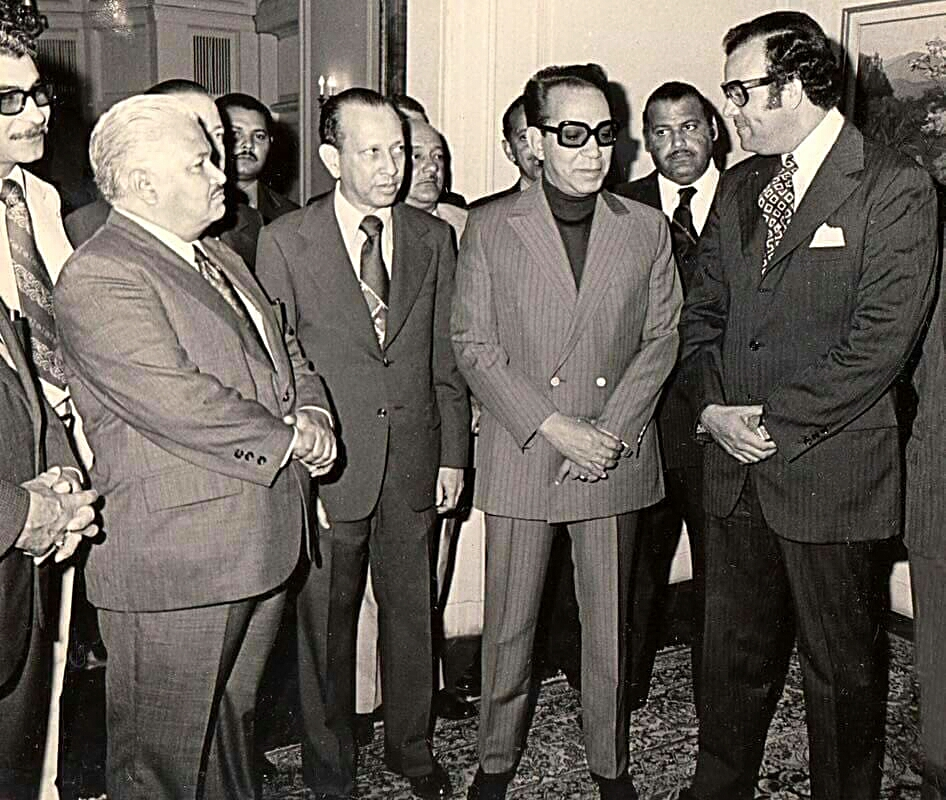
Francisco E. García, Mexican Ambassador to the Dominican Republic, and Cantinflas

Like Charlie Chaplin, Cantinflas was a social satirist. He played el pelado, an impoverished Everyman, with hopes to succeed. With mutual admiration, Cantinflas was influenced by Chaplin's earlier films and ideology. El Circo (the circus) was a "shadow" of Chaplin's silent film, The Circus and Si yo fuera diputado ("If I Were a Congressman") had many similarities with the 1940 film, The Great Dictator. Cantinflas' films, to this day, still generate revenue for Columbia Pictures. In 2000, Columbia reported in an estimated US$4 million in foreign distribution from the films.

== Death ==
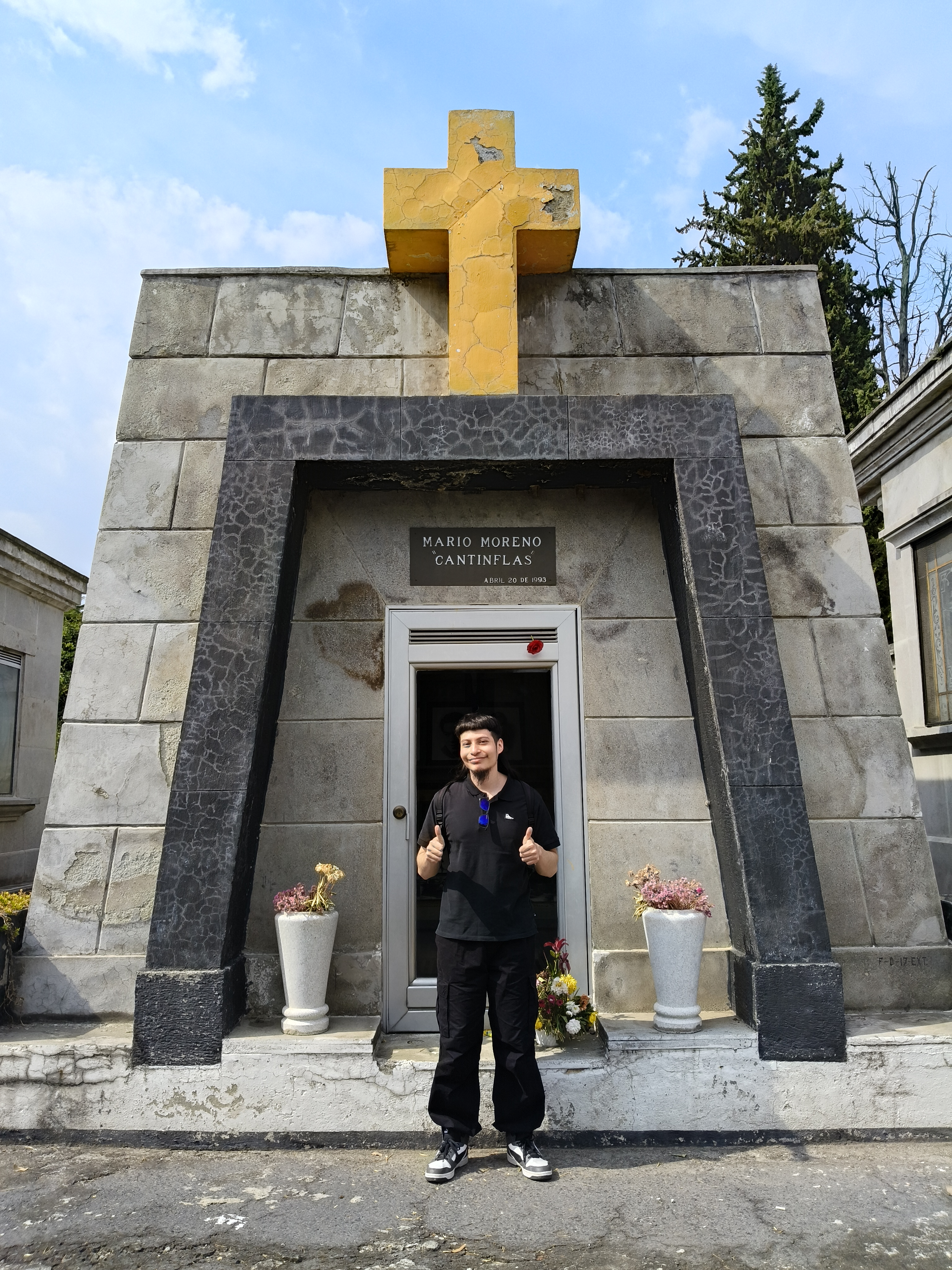
Crypt of Cantinflas at the Panteón Español photographed in 2025.

A lifelong smoker, Cantinflas died of lung cancer on 20 April 1993 in Mexico City. Thousands appeared on a rainy day for his funeral. The ceremony was a national event, lasting three days. He was honored by many heads of state and the United States Senate, which held a moment of silence for him. His ashes lay at the crypt of the Moreno Reyes family, in the Panteón Español ("Spanish Cemetery") in Mexico City.

A 20-year legal battle followed between Mario Moreno Ivanova, Cantinflas' son and heir to his estate, and the actor's blood nephew Eduardo Moreno Laparade over the control of 34 films made by Cantinflas. The nephew claimed his uncle gave him a written notice, Moreno Ivanova argued that he was the direct heir of Cantinflas and that the rights belonged to him. In 2014, Eduardo Moreno Laparade won the rights at the Mexican Supreme Court to 39 films and the name. At the same time, there was another legal battle between Columbia Pictures and Moreno Ivanova over control of these films. Columbia claimed that it had bought the rights to the 34 films four decades earlier, although the court noted several discrepancies in the papers. Moreno Ivanova wanted the rights to the films to remain his, and more generally Mexico's, as a national treasure. On 2 June 2001 the eight-year battle was resolved with Columbia retaining ownership over the 34 disputed films.

== Career ==
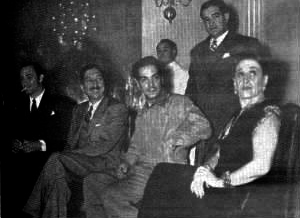
Meeting with Mexican president Miguel Alemán Valdés, seated from left to right: Jorge Negrete, the president Miguel Alemán Valdés, Cantinflas and María Tereza Montoya

Among the things that endeared him to his public was his comic use of language in his films; his characters (all of which were really variations of the main "Cantinflas" persona but cast in different social roles and circumstances) would strike up a normal conversation and then complicate it to the point where no one understood what they were talking about. The Cantinflas character was particularly adept at obfuscating the conversation when he owed somebody money, was courting an attractive young woman, or was trying to talk his way out of trouble with authorities, whom he managed to humiliate without their even being able to tell. This manner of talking became known as Cantinflear, and it became common parlance for Spanish speakers to say "¡estás cantinfleando!" (loosely translated as you're pulling a "Cantinflas!" or you're "Cantinflassing!") whenever someone became hard to understand in conversation. The Real Academia Española officially included the verb, cantinflear, cantinflas and cantinflada in its dictionary in 1992.

In the visual arts, Mexican artists such as Rufino Tamayo and Diego Rivera painted Cantinflas as a symbol of the Mexican everyman.

Cantinflas' style and the content of his films have led scholars to conclude that he influenced the many teatros that spread the message of the Chicano Movement during the 1960s-1970s in the United States, the most important of which was El Teatro Campesino. The teatro movement was an important part of the cultural renaissance that was the social counterpart of the political movement for the civil rights of Mexican Americans. Cantinflas' use of social themes and style is seen as a precursor to Chicano theater.

A cartoon series, the Cantinflas Show, was made in 1972 starring an animated Cantinflas. The show was targeted for children and was intended to be educational. The first animated version animated by Santiago Moro and his brother Jose Luis Moro for Televisa in the early 1970s (Cantinflas Show) which educated children by meeting such notable people as Chopin, Louis Pasteur, Albert Einstein and William Shakespeare's Romeo and Juliet as well learning how important water and oil is and educational parodies of some of his famous movies like Su Excelencia [La Carta with incidental music from Aaron Copland's El Salón México] In the second version his character was known as "Little Amigo" and concentrated on a wide range of subjects intended to educate children, from the origin of soccer to the reasons behind the International Date Line. The second animated series animated in 1979 and dubbed in English in 1982 was a joint venture between Televisa and Hanna-Barbera and Mario Moreno voiced "Little Amigo"/Cantinflas in the Spanish version and Don Messick voiced "Little Amigo" and John Stephenson as the narrator in the English version. Both The Cantinflas Show and Amigos and Friends aired in the mid 1990s on Univision and Televisa re aired The Cantinflas Show in the mid 1990s.

Although Cantinflas never achieved the same success in the United States as in Mexico, he was honored with a star on the Hollywood Walk of Fame at 6438 Hollywood Boulevard on October 10, 1980. He earned two Golden Globe nominations (winning one) for best actor and the Mexican Academy of Film Lifetime Achievement Award. His handprints have been imbedded onto the Paseo de las Luminarias for his work in motion pictures.

The Mario Moreno "Cantinflas" Award is handed out annually for entertainers who "represent the Latino community with the same humor and distinction as the legendary Mario Moreno "Cantinflas" and who, like Cantinflas, utilizes his power to help those most in need".

On 12 August 2018, the Google Doodle paid homage to Cantinflas on his 107th birth anniversary.

=== Characterizations ===
Moreno's life is the subject of the biographical film Cantinflas (2014, directed by Sebastian del Amo). It stars Óscar Jaenada, who portrays a young Mario Moreno attempting to gain respect and make a living as an actor, and award-winning actor Michael Imperioli as Mike Todd, an American film-producer struggling to film his masterpiece. The film is centered in Moreno's personal life, and in the development of Todd's Golden Globe Award-winning 1956 film Around the World in 80 Days.

== Critical response ==
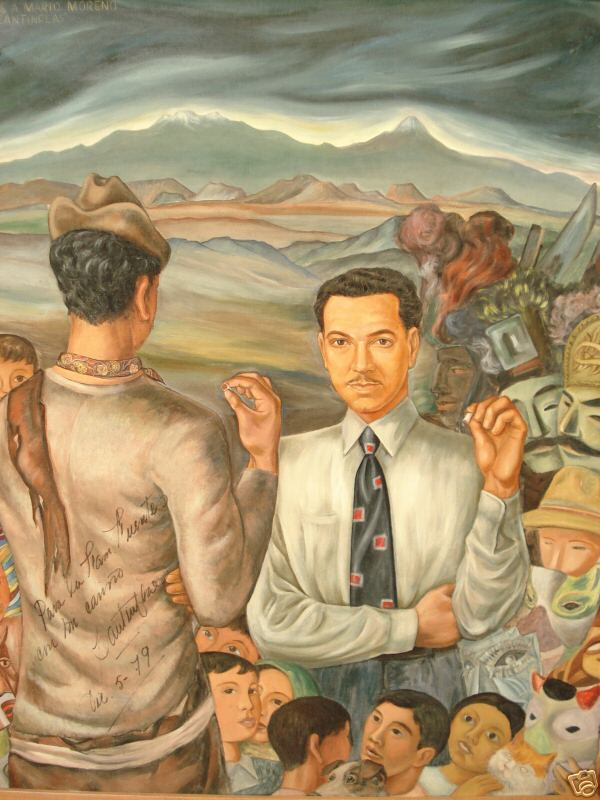
Cantinflas depicted in 1952 by the Chilean muralist Fernando Marcos Miranda.

Cantinflas is sometimes seen as a Mexican Groucho Marx character, one who uses his skill with words to puncture the pretensions of the wealthy and powerful, the police and the government, with the difference that he strongly supported democracy. Historian and author of Cantinflas and the Chaos of Mexican Modernity, writes, "Cantinflas symbolized the underdog who triumphed through trickery over more powerful opponents" and presents Cantinflas as a self-image of a transitional Mexico. Gregorio Luke, executive director of the Museum of Latin American Art said, "To understand Cantinflas is to understand what happened in Mexico during the last century".

Monsiváis interprets Moreno's portrayals in terms of the importance of the spoken word in the context of Mexico's "reigning illiteracy" (70% in 1930). Particularly in the film El analfabeto, (The Illiterate), "Cantinflas is the illiterate who takes control of the language by whatever means he can".

The writer Salvador Novo interpreted the role of Moreno's character entirely in terms of Cantinflismo: "En condensarlos: en entregar a la saludable carcajada del pueblo la esencia demagógica de su vacuo confusionismo, estriba el mérito y se asegura la gloria de este hijo cazurro de la ciudad ladina y burlona de México, que es 'Cantinflas'". ("In condensing them [the leaders of the world and of Mexico], in returning to the healthy laughter of the people the demagogic essence of their empty confusion, merit is sustained and glory is ensured for the self-contained son of the Spanish-speaking mocker of Mexico, who Cantinflas portrays.")

In his biography of the comic, scholar of Mexican culture Jeffrey M. Pilcher views Cantinflas as a metaphor for "the chaos of Mexican modernity", a modernity that was just out of reach for the majority of Mexicans: "His nonsense language eloquently expressed the contradictions of modernity as 'the palpitating moment of everything that wants to be that which it cannot be'." Likewise, "Social hierarchies, speech patterns, ethnic identities, and masculine forms of behavior all crumbled before his chaotic humor, to be reformulated in revolutionary new ways."

== Filmography ==
Cinema of Mexico
Year	Director	Title	Role	Notes
1937	Miguel Contreras Torres	Don't Fool Yourself, Dear	Canti	
1937	Arcady Boytler	Such Is My Country	El Tejón	
1937	Arcady Boytler	Heads or Tails	Polito Sol	
1939	Chano Urueta	The Sign of Death	Cantinflas	
1939	Fernando Rivera	Siempre listo en las tinieblas	Chencho Albondigon	Short
1939	Fernando Rivera	Jengibre contra Dinamita	Cantinflas	Short
1940	Juan Bustillo Oro	You're Missing the Point	Cantinflas / "Leonardo del Paso"	
1940	Carlos Toussaint	Cantinflas y su prima	Cantinflas	Short
1940	Fernando Rivera	Cantinflas ruletero	Cantinflas	Short
1940	Fernando Rivera	Cantinflas boxeador	Cantinflas	Short
1941	Alejandro Galindo	Neither Blood Nor Sand	El Chato / Manuel Márquez "Manolete"	
1941	Miguel M. Delgado	The Unknown Policeman	El Chato / Badge Number 777 / The King of Diamonds	
1942	Carlos Villatoro	Carnival in the Tropics	Himself	Cameo
1942	Miguel M. Delgado	The Three Musketeers	Cantinflas / D'Artagnan	
1943	Miguel M. Delgado	The Circus	Cantinflas	
1943	Miguel M. Delgado	Romeo and Juliet	Cantinflas / Romeo de Montesco / Abelardo Del Monte	
1944	Miguel M. Delgado	Gran Hotel	Cantinflas	
1945	Miguel M. Delgado	A Day with the Devil	Cantinflas / Juan Pérez	
1946	Miguel M. Delgado	I Am a Fugitive	Cantinflas	
1947	Miguel M. Delgado	Fly Away, Young Man!	Cantinflas	
1948	Miguel M. Delgado	The Genius	Cantinflas	
1949	Miguel M. Delgado	The Magician	Cantinflas	
1950	Miguel M. Delgado	The Doorman	Cantinflas	
1951	Miguel M. Delgado	El Siete Machos	Margarito / El Siete Machos	
1952	Miguel M. Delgado	If I Were a Congressman	Cantinflas	
1952	Miguel M. Delgado	The Atomic Fireman	Cantinflas / Badge Number 777	
1953	Raúl Medina	Bella, la salvaje		
1953	Miguel M. Delgado	The Photographer	Cantinflas	
1954	Miguel M. Delgado	A Tailored Gentleman	Cantinflas	
1955	Miguel M. Delgado	Drop the Curtain	Cantinflas	
1957	Miguel M. Delgado	El bolero de Raquel	Cantinflas	
1958	Tulio Demicheli	Ama a tu prójimo	Luis	
1959	Miguel M. Delgado	Sube y baja	Cantinflas / Falso Jorge Maciel	
1961	Miguel M. Delgado	The Illiterate One	Inocencio Prieto y Calvo	
1962	Miguel M. Delgado	The Extra	Rogaciano	
1963	Miguel M. Delgado	Immediate Delivery	Feliciano Calloso / XU 777	
1964	Miguel M. Delgado	El padrecito	Sebastián	
1965	Miguel M. Delgado	El señor doctor	Salvador Medina	
1967	Miguel M. Delgado	Su excelencia	Lopitos	
1968	Miguel M. Delgado	Por mis pistolas	Fidencio Barrenillo	
1969	Miguel M. Delgado	Un Quijote sin mancha	Justo Leal, Aventado	
1971	Miguel M. Delgado	El profe	Sócrates García	
1973	Roberto Gavaldón	Don Quijote cabalga de nuevo	Sancho Panza	
1973	Miguel M. Delgado	Conserje en condominio	Úrsulo	
1976	Miguel M. Delgado	El ministro y yo	Mateo Melgarejo	
1978	Miguel M. Delgado	El patrullero 777	Diógenes Bravo / Badge Number 777	
1982	Miguel M. Delgado	El barrendero	Napoleón	

== Awards and nominations ==
Year	Award	Category	Film	Outcome
1952	Ariel Awards	Special Ariel		Won
1987	Ariel Awards	Golden Ariel		Won
1957	Golden Globe Awards	Best Performance by an Actor in a Motion Picture – Comedy or Musical	Around the World in 80 Days	Won
1961	Golden Globe Awards	Best Performance by an Actor in a Motion Picture – Comedy or Musical	Pepe	Nominated
1961	Laurel Awards	Top Male Comedy Performance	Pepe	Nominated
1962	Menorah Awards	Best Comic Actor	El analfabeto	Won

== See also ==
- Chespirito
- Mononymous person

== Sources ==
- Garcia Riera, Emilio, 1970. Historia documental del cine mexicano, vol. II.
- Leñero, Vicente. Historia del Teatro de los Insurgentes.
- Monsiváis, Carlos, 1999. Cantinflas and Tin Tan: Mexico's Greatest Comedians. In Hershfield, Joanne, and Maciel, David R. (Eds.), Mexico's Cinema: A Century of Film and Filmmakers, pp. 49–79. Wilmington, Delaware: Scholarly Resources, Inc. ISBN 0-8420-2681-9
- Morales, Miguel Ángel, 1996. Cantinflas: Amo de las carpas. México: Editorial Clío, Libros y Videos, S. A. de C. V. ISBN 968-6932-58-5
- Novo, Salvador, 1967. Nueva grandeza mexicana. México: Ediciones Era.
- Pilcher, Jeffrey M., 2001. Cantinflas and the chaos of Mexican modernity. Wilmington, Delaware: Scholarly Resources. ISBN 0-8420-2769-6
- Smith, Ronald L. (Ed.), (1992). Who's Who in Comedy pp. 88–89. New York: Facts on File. ISBN 0-8160-2338-7
- Stavans, Ilan, 1998. The Riddle of Cantinflas: Essays on Hispanic popular culture. Albuquerque: University of New Mexico Press. ISBN 0-8263-1860-6
