= Rosalío Solano =

Mexican cinematographer

Rosalío Solano (August 30, 1914 – August 20, 2009) was a Mexican cinematographer of the Golden Age of Mexican cinema, perhaps best known for his work in the film Talpa; which won him the Silver Ariel for Best Cinematography of 1957.

== Selected work ==
- My Wife Is Not Mine (1951)
- Streetwalker (1951)
- I Don't Deny My Past (1952)
- Nobody's Children (1952)
- Victims of Divorce (1952)
- Where the Circle Ends (1956)
- Corazón salvaje (1956)
- Talpa (1956)
- Happiness (1957)
- His First Love (1960)
- Tom Thumb and Little Red Riding Hood (1962)
- Tlayucan (1962)
- Always Further On (1965)
- La Valentina (1966)
- Su Excelencia (1967)
- 5 de chocolate y 1 de fresa (1968)
- Slaughter (1972)
- The Cay (1974)
- Do You Hear the Dogs Barking? (1975)
- Length of War (1976)
- La Casa del Pelícano (1978)
- Puerto Maldito (1979)
- La Pachanga (1981)
