= List of Mexican films of the 1910s =

A List of Mexican films of the 1910s, ordered by year of release from 1910 to 1919.

Title	Director	Cast	Genre	Notes
1910
Toma de posesión de Porfirio Díaz	Salvador Toscano	Porfirio Díaz	Documentary	
Maniobras militares en Anzures	Guillermo Becerril		Documentary	
Fiestas del centenario de la independencia IV	Guillermo Becerril		Documentary	
Fiestas del centenario de la independencia II	Salvador Toscano		Documentary	
1911
Viaje triunfal del apóstol de la democracia, Francisco I. Madero	Salvador Toscano	Francisco I. Madero	Documentary	
Propaganda para Pino Suárez	Salvador Toscano		Documentary	
Madero y Pino Suárez en la capital	Salvador Toscano	Francisco I. Madero, José María Pino Suárez	Documentary	
Elecciones primarias en México	Salvador Toscano		Documentary	
Toma de ciudad Juarez y el viaje del heroe de la revolución Don Francisco I. Madero	Salvador Toscano	Francisco I. Madero	Documentary	
General Reyes desde el balcón de su casa manifiesta al pueblo su adhesión al Sr. Madero y a los principales salvadores de la revolución	Salvador Toscano		Documentary	
Aspecto de la estación del ferrocarril mexicano el día de la llegada del general Reyes	Salvador Toscano		Documentary	
La Campaña electoral	Salvador Toscano		Documentary	
Historia de la revolución, desde la toma de ciudad Juarez hasta la salida del licensiado Leon de la Barra	Salvador Toscano		Documentary	
Toma de posesión de Don Francisco I. Madero	Salvador Toscano	Francisco I. Madero	Documentary	
Recibimiento a Madero en Lagos y Ocotlan	Salvador Toscano		Documentary	
Últimos sucesos sangrientos de Puebla y la llegada de Madero a esa ciudad	Guillermo Becerril	Francisco I. Madero	Documentary	
1912
Revolución en Veracruz	Enrique Rosas		Documentary	
El Aniversario del Fallecimiento de la suegra de Enhart	Salvador, Guillermo, Eduardo, and Carlos Alva		Comedy	
1913
Decena tragica I	Enrique Rosas		Documentary	
Decena tragica II	Guillermo Becerril		Documentary	
Revolución felicista	Guillermo Becerril		Documentary	
1914
La voz de su raza	Carlos Martínez Arredondo	Hector Herrera	Drama	
Tiempos Mayas	Carlos Martínez Arredondo	Elsa Calderon, Manuel Ciberol	Drama	
1915
1916
¡Los libertadores de México!	Carlos Martínez Arredondo	Carmen Beltran, Armando Camejo, Manuel Cirerol Sansores	History	Also known as 1810
Documentación nacional historica	Enrique Rosas		Documentary	
1917
Alma de sacrificio	Joaquín Coss		Drama, Romance	
Barranca trágica	Santiago J. Sierra	María Luisa Carvajal, Elena Natalie Castro, Jose Flores Alatorre, Santiago Sierra, Elena Sánchez Valenzuela	Drama	
El amor que huye	Carlos Martínez Arredondo	María Caballé, Maria de la Luz Gonzalez, Ángel de León	Drama	
En defensa Propia	Joaquín Coss		Drama	
La luz, tríptico de la vida moderna	J. Jamet, Manuel de la Bandera, Ezequiel Carrasco	Emma Padilla, Ernesto Agüeros	Romance	
La soñadora	Eduardo Arozamena, Enrique Rosas	Mimí Derba, Eduardo Arozamena, Nelly Fernández	Romance	
Tabaré	Luis Lezama		Historical, Melodrama	
Tepeyac	José Manuel Ramos, Carlos E. González, Fernando Sáyago		Drama	
La tigresa	Mimí Derba, Enrique Rosas	Salvador Arnaldo, Manuel Arvide, Juan Barba	Drama	
Triste crepúsculo	Manuel de la Bandera		Drama	
Los amores de Amparito	Carlos Martínez Arredondo		Comedy	
Aida	Enrique Rosas		Drama	
1918
Santa	Luis G. Peredo		Drama	
Fiestas de la reina de belleza en Yucatan	Carlos Martínez Arredondo		Documentary	
Las Ruinas de Uxmal	Carlos Martínez Arredondo		Documentary	
Costumbres Mayas	Carlos Martínez Arredondo		Documentary	
Sepelio de Quinito Valverde y del aviador Arnaldo Paniagua	Enrique Rosas		Documentary	
1919
El automóvil gris	Enrique Rosas	Joaquín Coss, Juan de Homs, Manuel de los Ríos	Action	
La banda del automóvil (La dama enlutada)	Ernesto Vollrath		Adventure, Drama	
Cuauhtémoc	Manuel de la Bandera		Drama	
La llaga	Luis G. Peredo		Drama	
Viaje redondo	José Manuel Ramos	Leopoldo Beristáin, Lucina Joya, Armando López, Joaquín Pardavé, Alicia Pérez	Drama	
El cultivo del henequen	Carlos Martínez Arredondo		Documentary	
Venganza de bestia	Carlos Martínez Arredondo	Marieta Fuller, Enrique Pacheco, Jose Rachini	Adventure	
La Caída de Carranza	Enrique Rosas		Documentary	
Emiliano Zapata en vida y muerte	Enrique Rosas		Documentary	
