= Héctor Herrera (disambiguation) =

Héctor Herrera (born 1990) is a Mexican footballer.

Héctor Herrera may also refer to:

- Héctor Belo Herrera (born 1905), Uruguayan fencer
- Héctor Herrera (runner) (born 1959), Cuban athlete
- Héctor Herrera (photographer) (born 1934), Mexican photographer
- Héctor Herrera, silent film actor, List of Mexican films of the 1910s
- Héctor Herrera (actor), Silver Ariel for best supporting actor in Lake Tahoe 2008
- Hector Herrera (animator), Mexican-Canadian animator best known for The Ballad of Immortal Joe
