= María Conesa =

Spanish and Mexican stage, television, film actress

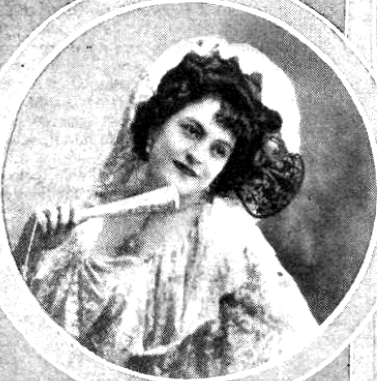
- María Conesa, 1912
- Born: María Conesa; December 12, 1892; Vinaròs, Spain
- Died: September 4, 1978 (aged 85); Mexico City, Mexico
- Resting place: Spanish Cemetery, Mexico City
- Other name: La Gatita Blanca (The Little White Kitten)
- Occupation: Actress
- Years active: 1901–1978
- Spouse: Manuel Sanz
- Children: 1

María Conesa, also known as La Gatita Blanca (The White Kitten) (December 12, 1892 – September 9, 1978), was a Spanish and Mexican stage, television, film actress and vedette. She was one of the principal stars of the Revue and Vaudeville in México and Latin America in the early 20th century.

== Biography ==
She began her career in Spain in the stage company named Aurora Infantil with her sister Teresita. Both highlighted in many plays. This caused that the actress La Zarina, jealous of the success of the girls ordered her murder. Teresita died stabbed on the spot, and María was saved by a miracle. Overcome the tragedy, María's father did everything possible to make her a big star.

She arrived to Mexico in 1901 with a company of children actors who played zarzuelas at the Teatro Principal. Later she doing a small role in La verbena de la Paloma. In, 1907 she was presented at the Teatro Albisu of Havana (Cuba), with La Gatita Blanca (The White Kitten), getting an overwhelming success. She took the nickname of La Gatita Blanca for the rest of her life. Her major success did not originate from her vocal powers but the playfulness of her performances in the dances, accompanied by suggestive lyrics, caused the sense in the public.

She returned to Mexico in 1907 consecrated her as the very first vaudeville star by the public of Barcelona and Havana. She appearing again in the Teatro Principal with her ultimate creation: La Gatita Blanca. She is also known as the little mother of the Spanish for her generosity to the poor Spanish indigents. Her other big hits were La alegre trompetería and Las musas latinas. Her popularity was so great that even a political party with her name was created: the PCE (Partido Conesista Estudiantil), which defended her of the attacks of the public and the press. In 1909 debuted at the Teatro Colón, with scandals and severe criticism in the press.

Political events in Mexico made her return to Spain in 1912, but she was an institution in Mexico, and returned in 1914 with a great excitement by review and public. She reappeared with the play La niña besucona although her greatest success of that season was La bella Lucerito.

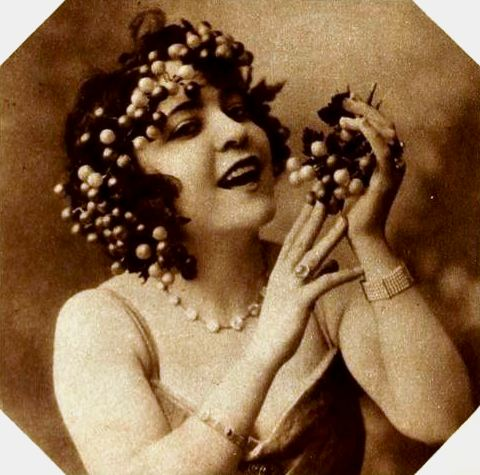
Spanish actress María Conesa, on page 52 of the January 1922 Photoplay.

In the heart of the Mexican Revolution, María continued the function. She had said: The bullets respect me. From 1915-1923, Conesa acted in the most important theaters in Mexico City and toured the interior of the republic. She was known as the vaudeville star of the Revolution. The Mexican revolutionary Pancho Villa fell in love with her when she cut a button of his shirt in the representation of the play La espercheleras. He tried to kidnap her, but she managed to slip of the revolutionary.

Later, Conesa together with Esperanza Iris and Prudencia Grifell, formed a stage company knows as Las Tres Gracias. María also gave impetus to the careers of other celebrated vaudeville stars, such as Celia Montalvan, Lupe Rivas Cacho, Aurora Walker La Walkiria, Mimí Derba and Lupe Vélez.

Maria Conesa married with Manuel Sanz, young descendant of a family of lineage. She became pregnant and had given birth out of wedlock. Mr. Sanz ended up being for all, "Mr. Conesa", and tired of showbiz of his wife, divorced her. "The White Kitten" was a personal friend of several Mexican presidents: Porfirio Díaz, Francisco I. Madero, Venustiano Carranza, Alvaro Obregón and Plutarco Elías Calles The musician Agustín Lara was so impressed by her, that he composed two themes: La guapa y Monísima mujer.

She also became a stage entrepreneur of the Teatro Virginia Fábregas. She was also accused of nexus with the Mexican criminal gang La Banda del Automovil Gris. The rumors says that Juan Mérigo, leader of the gang, stole jewelry and houses for María.

She also appeared on radio, television, nightclubs and filmed several movies in Mexico. The Hollywood industry was interested in her. She did some testing and ended up rejecting the offer.

María was well known and respected in the Mexican show, where she counted with friends like Lupe Vélez, Dolores del Río, María Félix, Cantinflas and Arturo de Córdova, among others. She was immortalized by popular songs like Mi querído Capitán, El castigador y El morrongo, among others.

With the decline of the vaudeville and the revue, María agreed to make some inroads in film in the 1940s and 1950s, and even made a telenovela in the 1960s.

Her father, mother and brother died when María was in full triumph. After would die her ex-husband Manuel Sanz, her only son Tony, and her only grandson. She buried them all.

In August 1978, she starred in a zarzuela company in the Teatro de la Ciudad with the role of Aunt Antonia in la verbena de la Paloma. Nobody could imagine that with this function she was saying goodbye to her audience, playing precisely the same play that she made in Mexico. On September 4, excelled in every newspaper headlines that The eternal María Conesa was gone forever." She left all her property to the Universidad Nacional Autonoma de México. In 1981, Televisa produced the serie Toda una vida, inspired in the Conesa's life and starred by the Mexican actress Ofelia Medina.

== Filmography ==
=== Films ===
- El pobre Valbuena (1917)
- Payasos nacionales (1922)
- Refugiados en Madrid (1938)
- Madre a la fuerza (1940)
- Una mujer con pasado (1949)
- La rebelión de los fantasmas (1949)
- Hijos de la mala vida (1949)
- Between Your Love and Heaven (1950)

=== Television ===
- Las Abuelas (1965)
