= History of a Heart =

- Directed by: Julio Bracho
- Written by: Max Aub; Julio Bracho; Mauricio Magdaleno
- Produced by: Jesús Grovas
- Starring: Rosario Granados; Albert Carrier; Alma Delia Fuentes
- Cinematography: Raúl Martínez Solares
- Edited by: Gloria Schoemann
- Music by: Manuel Esperón
- Production company: Cinematográfica Grovas
- Release date: 22 August 1951
- Running time: 105 minutes
- Country: Mexico
- Language: Spanish

History of a Heart (Spanish:Historia de un corazón) is a 1951 Mexican drama film directed by Julio Bracho and starring Rosario Granados, Albert Carrier and Alma Delia Fuentes.

== Cast ==
- Rosario Granados as Isaura
- Albert Carrier as Fernando Sandoval
- Alma Delia Fuentes as Maria Elena
- Prudencia Grifell as Directora del colegio
- Beatriz Ramos as Virginia
- José María Linares-Rivas as Don Alberto
- Mimí Derba as Isabel
- Emperatriz Carvajal as Matilde
- Ismael Larumbe as Rodolfo
- Teresa Carvajal as Olga
- Enrique Díaz 'Indiano' as Jose, mayordomo
- Jorge Treviño as Don Melquiades
- Aurora Walker
- Felipe Montoya
- Maruja Grifell as Madre de alumna
- Conchita Gentil Arcos as Miembra educativa
- Diana Ochoa as Amiga de Isaura
- Lidia Franco as Invitada a fiesta

== Bibliography ==
- Jesús Ibarra. Los Bracho: tres generaciones de cine mexicano. UNAM, 2006.
