= He Who Died of Love =

- Directed by: José Díaz Morales
- Written by: Tito Davison; Théophile Gautier; Carlos León; Antonio Momplet; Miguel Morayta
- Starring: Rosario Granados; Julio Villarreal; Hilde Krüger
- Cinematography: Ignacio Torres
- Edited by: Mario González
- Music by: Elías Breeskin
- Production company: Los Artistas Asociados
- Release date: 8 November 1945
- Country: Mexico
- Language: Spanish

He Who Died of Love (Spanish:El que murió de amor) is a 1945 Mexican fantasy comedy film directed by Miguel Morayta. It stars Julián Soler, Luis Aldás, and Hilde Krüger. The film's sets were designed by the art director Luis Moya.

== Cast ==
- Julián Soler as Conde Octavio de Reminsky
- Luis Aldás as Carlos Verlan
- Hilde Krüger as Condesa María
- Amparo Morillo as Elisa
- Fanny Schiller as Tía Rita
- Pita Amor as Julia
- Rosa Castro as Tía de Carlos
- Jorge Trevino as General Sibelius
- Conchita Carracedo as Lolita, criada
- Fernando Cortés as Dr. Aladino Jr.
- Norma Ancira
- Alejandro Ciangherotti as Narrator
- Julio Daneri as Padrino en duelo
- Ángel Di Stefani as Invitado a recepción
- José Escanero as Empleado del conde
- Ana María Hernández as Invitada a recepción
- Ramón G. Larrea as Médico
- Héctor Mateos as Padrino de duelo
- Manuel Pozos
- José Ignacio Rocha as Anciano indigente
- Joaquín Roche as Mayordomo
