= Adultery (1945 film) =

1945 film directed by José Díaz Morales

- Directed by: José Díaz Morales
- Written by: Benito Pérez Galdós; José Díaz Morales
- Produced by: Francisco Hormaechea de la Sota
- Starring: Rosario Granados; Julio Villarreal; Hilde Krüger
- Cinematography: Víctor Herrera
- Edited by: Alfredo Rosas Priego
- Music by: Severo Muguerza
- Production companies: Columbus Films; Producciones Hormaechea
- Release date: 1 March 1945
- Country: Mexico
- Language: Spanish

Adultery (Spanish: Adulterio) is a 1945 Mexican drama film directed by José Díaz Morales and starring Rosario Granados, Julio Villarreal and Hilde Krüger.

== Plot ==
A man commits suicide due to his wife's infidelity. The man's father then attempts to determine by scientific means which of his granddaughters is not his biological grandchild.

== Cast ==
- Rosario Granados as Laura
- Julio Villarreal as Don Agustín Escandón
- Hilde Krüger as Graciela
- Prudencia Grifell as Doña Lupita
- Nuri Conde as María
- Carlos Amador as Pedro
- Maruja Grifell as Gregoria
- Roberto Corell
- Jesús Valero
- Edmundo Espino as Alcalde
- Estanislao Shilinsky as Damán
- Manuel Arvide
- Roberto Cañedo as Amante de Graciela
- María Gentil Arcos as Esposa de alcalde
- Ramón G. Larrea
- Eduardo Noriega as Amante de Graciela
- Ignacio Peón
- Paz Villegas

== Bibliography ==
- Goble, Alan. The Complete Index to Literary Sources in Film. Walter de Gruyter, 1999.
