= Albert Carrier =

Canadian-American actor (1919–2002)

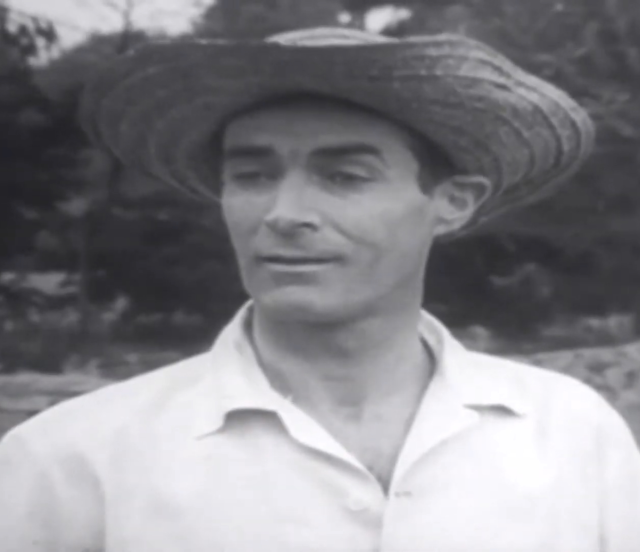
- Carrier in Lock-Up, 1961
- Born: Alberto Carrieri; October 16, 1919; Magog, Quebec, Canada
- Died: May 23, 2002 (aged 82); Los Angeles, California, U.S.
- Occupation: Actor
- Years active: 1950–1984
- Spouse: Beatriz Ramos (m. 1950, divorced)

Albert Carrieri (October 16, 1919 – May 23, 2002) was a Canadian-American film and television actor. He was best known for playing Pedro Quinn, a sugar mogul working with Alejandro Sosa (Paul Shenar) in the film Scarface (1983). He was also known for playing the role of the villainous Captain Jacques Tremaine in the film Major Dundee (1965).

== Life and career ==
Carrier was born in Magog, Quebec. He began his acting career in Mexico in 1950 during the Golden Age of Mexican Cinema, billed as 'Alberto Carrière'. In 1951, he played the lead role of Fernando Sandoval in the Julio Bracho film History of a Heart. Four years later, he moved to Los Angeles, California and gained his United States citizenship, thereafter appeared in numerous films and television programs.

In 1958, Carrier starred in the film Desert Hell, playing Sgt St. Clair. He appeared in films such as Two Weeks in Another Town, A New Kind of Love, The Secret Life of an American Wife, Fitzwilly, Thoroughly Modern Millie, Do Not Disturb, Tender Is the Night, Thunder in the Sun and Moment to Moment. During his screen career, in 1965, he played the villainous Captain Jacques Tremaine in Sam Peckinpah's film Major Dundee, and as Pedro Quinn, a sugar mogul working with Alejandro Sosa (Paul Shenar) in Brian De Palma's 1983 film Scarface, starring Al Pacino. He also guest-starred in numerous television programs including Adventures of Superman, 77 Sunset Strip, Maverick, The Twilight Zone, One Step Beyond, The Dick Van Dyke Show, Batman, Mission: Impossible, The F.B.I., The Rockford Files, and Three's Company. He retired from acting in 1984.

== Personal life and death ==
In 1950, Carrier married actress Beatriz Ramos in Mexico City. They divorced after he moved to the United States.

Carrier died on May 23, 2002 in Los Angeles, California, at the age of 82.
