= Mujeres que trabajan =

Mujeres que trabajan may refer to:

- Women Who Work (1938 film), an Argentine comedy film
- Women Who Work (1953 film), a Mexican drama film
