= Borrasca =

Borrasca (Spanish Borrasca, "storm") may refer to:

- Borrasca (TV series), a Mexican telenovela
- Borrasca (podcast), an American podcast series featuring Cole Sprouse
