= The War of the Pastries =

1944 film by Emilio Gómez Muriel

- Directed by: Emilio Gómez Muriel
- Written by: Celestino Gorostiza; Emilio Gómez Muriel; Rafael Solana
- Produced by: Diane Subervielle de Fontanals
- Starring: Mapy Cortés; Domingo Soler; Pedro Armendáriz
- Cinematography: Ignacio Torres
- Edited by: Gloria Schoemann
- Music by: Rodolfo Halffter
- Production company: Films Mundiales
- Distributed by: Clasa Films Mundiales
- Release date: 22 April 1944
- Running time: 98 minutes
- Country: Mexico
- Language: Spanish

The War of the Pastries (Spanish: La guerra de los pasteles) is a 1944 Mexican historical musical comedy film directed by Emilio Gómez Muriel and starring Mapy Cortés, Domingo Soler and Pedro Armendáriz. It was shot at the Clasa Studios in Mexico City. The film's sets were designed by the art director Jorge Fernández. It was loosely inspired by the Pastry War between France and Mexico in 1838.

== Synopsis ==
In the town of Tacubaya Suzette Remontel the daughter of a French pastry chef is engaged to the daughter of the mayor. However her preference for an army officer causes a diplomatic incident that threatens French military intervention.

== Cast ==
- Mapy Cortés as Suzette Remontel
- Domingo Soler as Coronel Roque Peñaranda
- Pedro Armendáriz as Antonio del Valle
- Fernando Cortés as Don André Remontel
- Delia Magaña as Hortensia
- Fanny Schiller as Tía Marieta
- Alfredo Varela as Perico
- Roberto Meyer as Don Narciso del Campo
- Jesús Valero as Bastonero
- Alfonso Jiménez as Rosillo
- Manuel Arvide as El Plenipotenciario
- Paz Villegas as Doña Fernanda
- Sofía Haller as Señora chismosa
- Alfredo Varela padre as Síndico
- María Douglas as Muchacha

== Bibliography ==
- Richard, Alfred. Censorship and Hollywood's Hispanic image: an interpretive filmography, 1936-1955. Greenwood Press, 1993.
- Serrano, Basilio . Puerto Rican Women from the Jazz Age: Stories of Success. 2019.
