= Carne de presidio =

- Directed by: Emilio Gómez Muriel
- Written by: Luis Alcoriza
- Produced by: Adolfo Grovas
- Starring: Pedro Armendáriz, Martha Roth, José María Linares-Rivas
- Cinematography: Jorge Stahl Jr.
- Edited by: Jorge Bustos
- Music by: Manuel Esperón
- Release date: 2 July 1952 (Mexico)
- Running time: 95 minutes
- Country: Mexico
- Language: Spanish

Carne de presidio (English: Meat in Prison) is a 1952 Mexican crime drama film directed by Emilio Gómez Muriel and written by Luis Alcoriza.
