= The Stronger Sex (1946 film) =

1946 film by Emilio Gómez Muriel

- Directed by: Emilio Gómez Muriel
- Written by: Max Aub; Agustín M. Carnicero; Humberto Gómez Landero; Miguel Morayta
- Produced by: José Luis Bueno
- Starring: Mapy Cortés; Rafael Baledón; Ángel Garasa; Delia Magaña; Emperatriz Carvajal; Alma Rosa Aguirre; Elsa Aguirre
- Cinematography: Agustín Martínez Solares
- Edited by: Jorge Bustos
- Music by: Ernesto Cortázar; Jose de la Vega; Rosalío Ramírez
- Production company: Clasa Films Mundiales
- Distributed by: Clasa-Mohme
- Release date: 23 May 1946
- Running time: 81 minutes
- Country: México
- Language: Spanish

The Stronger Sex (Spanish: El Sexo Fuerte) is a 1946 Mexican comedy film directed by Emilio Gómez Muriel and starring Mapy Cortés, Rafael Baledón, Ángel Garasa, Delia Magaña and Emperatriz Carvajal. This film marked the film debut of the Aguirre sisters (Elsa Aguirre and Alma Rosa Aguirre).

It was shot at the Clasa Studios in Mexico City. The film's sets were designed by art directors Jorge Fernández and Edward Fitzgerald.

== Synopsis ==
Two men are shipwrecked on a remote island ruled entirely by women. They discover that men have been reduced to an inferior, slave-like status. However, the arrival of the two outsiders soon disrupts the social hierarchy of the island.

== Cast ==
- Mapy Cortés as Reina Eva XLV
- Rafael Baledón as Adán Preciado
- Ángel Garasa as Curro Calvo
- Delia Magaña as Secretaria de Eva XLV
- Emperatriz Carvajal as Ministra de guerra
- José Pidal as Don León
- Evelia Martínez as Subastadora
- Olga Leticia Mendoza as Sargenta 1
- América Imperio as Sargenta 2
- Pedro D'Aguillón as Operador
- Alma Rosa Aguirre as Pacienta 1a
- Elsa Aguirre as Ministra de salubridad
- Elisa Christy as Ministra de gobernación
- Julio Daneri as Prisionero
- José Escanero as Prisionero
- Héctor Mateos as Hombre en cabaret
- Francisco Reiguera as Prisionero
- Humberto Rodríguez as Futuro esposo
- Hernán Vera as Prisionero

== Bibliography ==
- Riera, Emilio García. Historia documental del cine mexicano: 1943-1945. Universidad de Guadalajara, 1992.
