= Blanca de Castejón =

Puerto Rican actress (1906–1969)

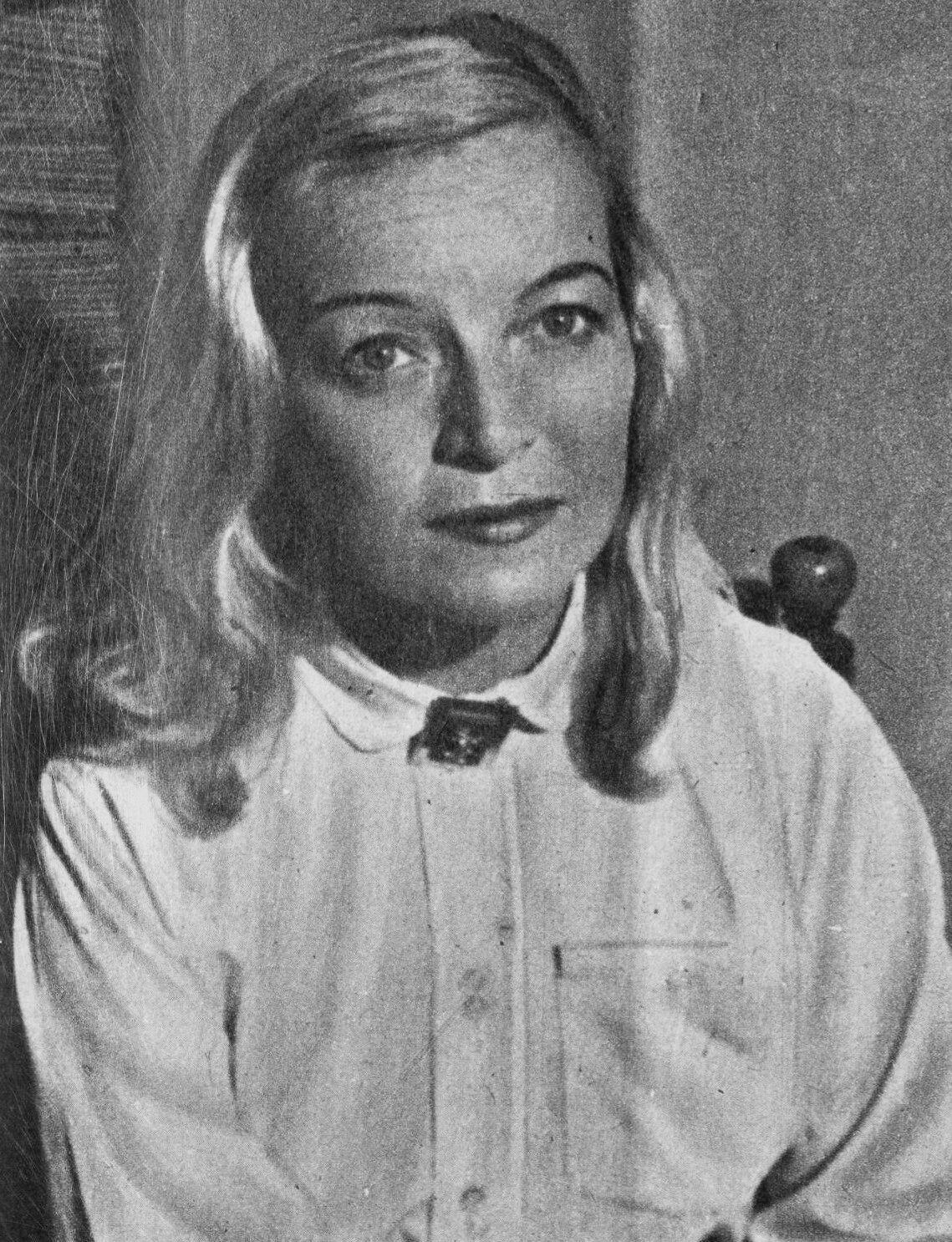
- Blanca de Castejón in 1955
- Born: May 13, 1906; Comerío, Puerto Rico
- Died: December 26, 1969 (aged 63); Mexico City, Mexico
- Occupation: Actress
- Spouse: Rafael Banquells (m. 1934; div. 1942)

Blanca de Castejón (May 13, 1906 – December 26, 1969) was a Puerto Rican actress who worked in the Golden Age of Argentine cinema in the 1930s and especially the Golden Age of Mexican cinema since the 1940s, where she achieved the greatest success and recognition. She was born in Comerío, Puerto Rico, and died in Mexico City.

Castejón began her career working for FOX in 1931. By the following year, had debuted in Mexico as part of an international career that would also take her to Spain, Uruguay and Argentina. She appeared in Crimen a las tres (1935), Carnaval del Diablo (1936), Mis dos Amores (1938), Los Hijos Mandan (1938), Las Dos Huérfanas (1941), Ave sin nido (1943), La razón de la culpa (1943), Que hombre tan simpático (1943), La Mujer del otro (1948) and Mamá me quita los novios (1952), among others.

== Life and career ==
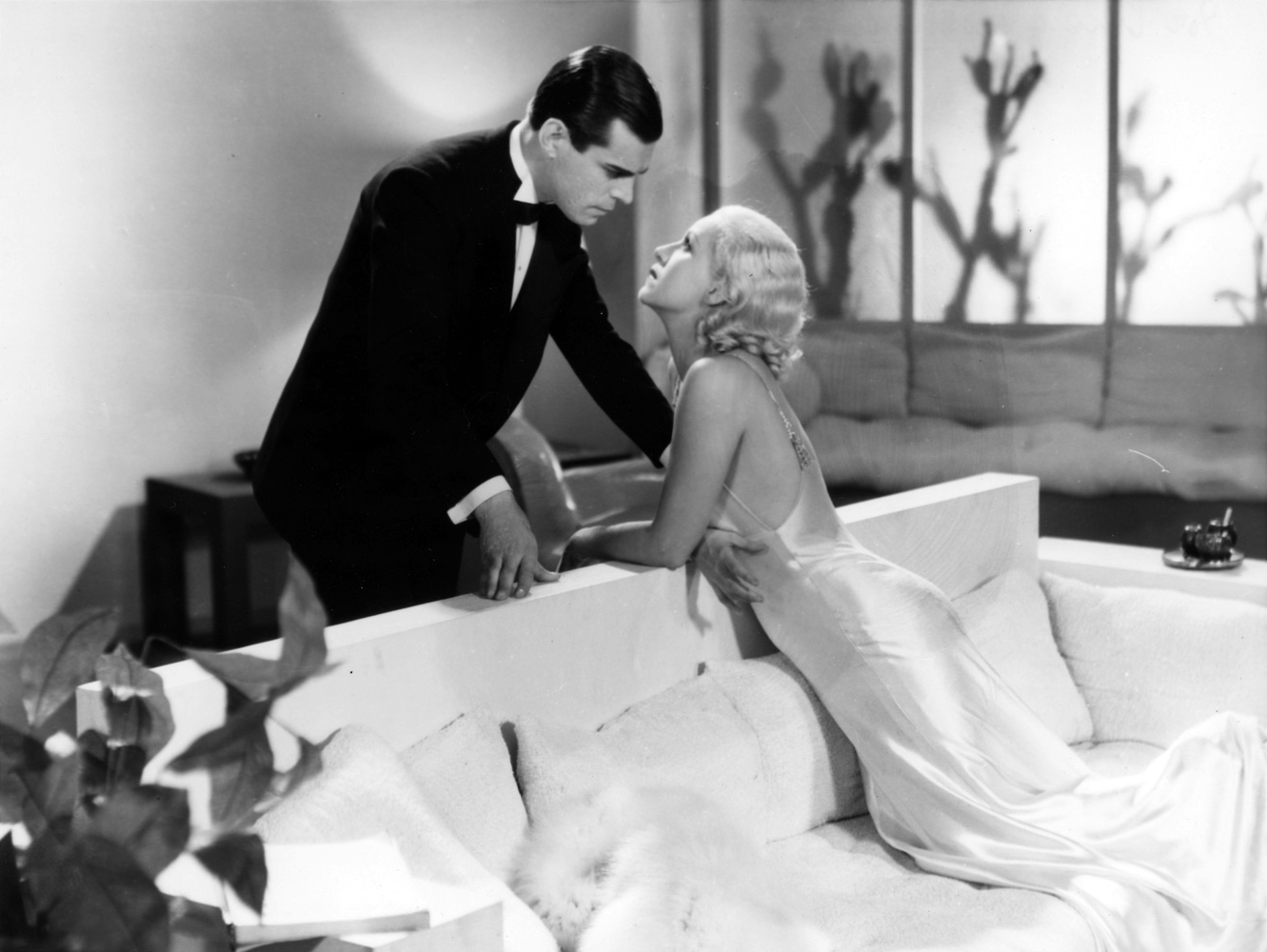
With José Gola in a film still for the 1935 Argentine film Por buen camino, directed by Eduardo Morera.

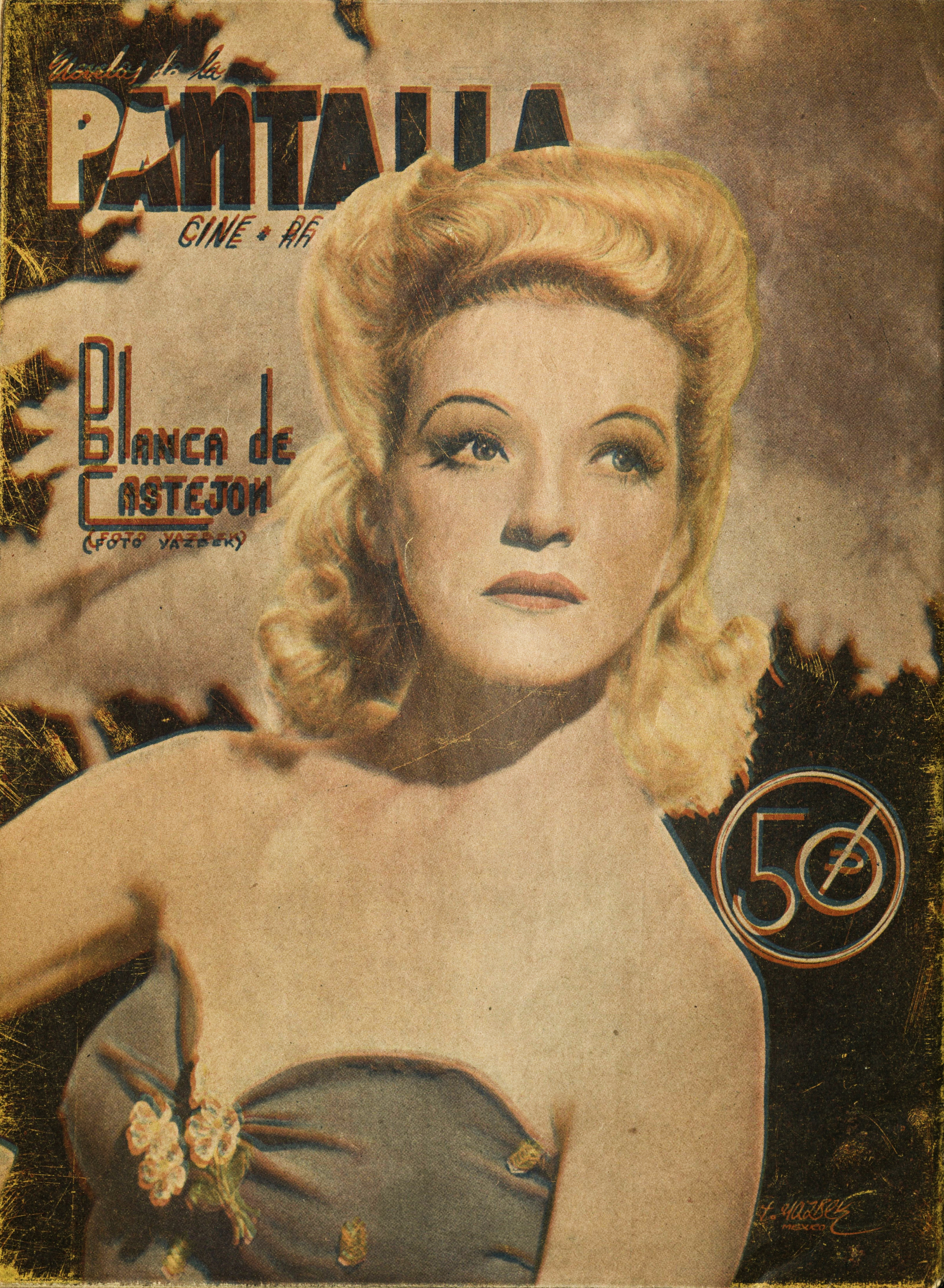
Blanca de Castejón in the Novelas de la Pantalla magazine in 1945

Blanca de Castejón Otero was born in Comerío, Puerto Rico, to Rafael Castejón Arnáiz, a telegraph operator, and Josefa Otero Rivera, a housewife. Had a younger sister named Margarita, a dancer. She began her career by participating in the theater and radio of Puerto Rico. Her instructors felt that Castejón dominated most genres.

Castejón was contracted by Fox, for whom she made her Hollywood debut in 1931's Resurrección, one of three films she made for Fox's Spanish-language unit. Afterwards she appeared in El impostor (1931) and Eran Trece (1931) for the studio. After stops in Mexico City and Havana, where she worked in the theater, Castejón went to Buenos Aires, where she made two feature films: Crimen a las tres (1935, a box-office flop) and Por buen camino (1935).

By the late 1930s she returned to Hollywood and starred in Spanish-language films, notably Mis dos amores (1938), starring the popular Mexican star Tito Guizar, and Los hijos mandan (Gabriel Soria, 1939), with Fernando Soler and Arturo de Córdova. Castejón co-wrote the screenplay of Los hijos mandan and both films were produced by Puerto Rican Rafael Ramos Cobián. The actress was married to Mexican actor Rafael Banquells when she relocated to Mexico City and joined the national film industry, where she made about thirty movies, taking part in what is known as the Golden Age of Mexican Cinema. Though she initially starred in melodramas like La razón de la culpa (Juan José Ortega, 1943), with Pedro Infante and María Elena Marqués, and Divorciadas (Alejandro Galindo, 1943), with René Cardona and Delia Magaña, Blanca de Castejón became best known for her supporting roles in comedies with popular comedians like Luis Sandrini and Fernando Soler. She won the 1954 Ariel award (Mexico's version of the Oscars) for her supporting role as a ditzy socialite in Escuela de vagabundos (School for Tramps), a very popular remake of the 1938 screwball comedy Merrily We Live, which reunited her with Pedro Infante. Castejón won the 1956 Ariel de Plata for co-starring in Escuela de Vagabundos (1955). She also appeared in a sequel of sorts, Escuela para suegras (1956). Castejón's last film was Los Signos del Zodiaco (1963).

Blanca de Castejón died in Mexico City, in 1969.

== Filmography ==
- Resurrection (1931)
- El impostor (1931) – Sandra
- Esclavas de la moda (1931) – Dora Durke
- Eran trece (There Were Thirteen) (1931) – Peggy Minchin (credited as Blanca Castejón)
- Crimen a las tres (1935)
- Por buen camino (1936)
- El carnaval del diablo (1936)
- Mis dos amores (1938) – Rita Santiago
- Los hijos mandan (1939)
- Qué hombre tan simpático (1943) – Doña Blanca
- La razón de la culpa (1943) – María de la Paz
- Ave sin nido (1943) – Anita de Medina
- Divorciadas (1943) – Cristina
- Imprudencia (1944)
- ¡Ya tengo a mi hijo! (1946) – Ana María
- Los maridos engañan de 7 a 9 (1946)
- Yo soy tu padre (1948) – Doña Carmen
- Cuide a su marido (1950) – Rosario
- Yo también soy de Jalisco (1950)
- Nosotras las taquígrafas (1950) – Blanquita
- My Goddaughter's Difficulties (1951) – Doña Carmen Martínez
- Todos son mis hijos (1951) – Doña María de Salgado
- Mamá nos quita los novios (1952) – Amadora
- Prefiero a tu papá (1952) – Anita Adalis
- Escuela para vagabundos (School for Tramps) (1955) – Emilia de Valverde
- El gallo colorado (1957)
- Escuela para suegras (School for Mothers-In-Law) (1958) – Amalia
- Mientras el cuerpo aguante (1958) – Regina Sarmiento
- Tres lecciones de amor (1959) – Doña Angustias
- Vagabundo y millonario (1959) – María de Aguilar
- Los signos del zodiaco (1963) – Lola Casarini

== See also ==
- List of Puerto Ricans
