= Ronald Chase =

American film director (1934–2025)

Ronald Chase (December 29, 1934 – December 20, 2025) was an American artist, photographer, educator, independent film maker and opera designer. His work with projection and film has been called "one of the most exciting developments in the history of opera stage presentation."

== Life and work ==
Chase was born in Seminole, Oklahoma. He studied dance, design and directing at Bard College, where he joined the Jean Erdman Dance Group. He toured with the José Limón Dance Company on their first European tour in the fall of 1956. After the tour he remained in Europe (Italy and Spain) to study painting. He then established a studio in the Gaspe Peninsula (Perce) in Canada. His first exhibits were at the Galerie Libre in Montreal (1962) and the Byron Gallery in New York City (1963). His work then entered the collections of the Montreal Museum of Fine Arts and the Boston Museum of Fine Arts. In the spring of 1964 he moved to San Francisco and continued his painting.

Chase died on December 20, 2025, at the age of 91.

== Photography ==
In the early 1980s Chase began experimenting with photography. He manipulated photographs using large format Xerox copiers. His work with figures and abstract imagery was given a show at the George Eastman House in 1984. His photographic work then entered the collections of the Metropolitan Museum of Art, the George Eastman House, and the Memorial Art Gallery in Rochester, New York among others.

== Film ==
In 1963, Chase began making short experimental films with Fragments, written by Mary Lee Settle and filmed in the Hudson Valley. In 1964, he began experimenting with using film projections in theater and dance performances. These experiments produced The Covenant, a dance film made with Elizabeth Harris and the composer Pauline Oliveros, followed by dramatic shorts including Chameleon and Clown, which was featured at the 1969 Ann Arbor Film Festival, and Parade, a short documentary of the first Gay & Lesbian Pride Parade in San Francisco.

Chase produced and directed two features in the 1970s. Bruges-La-Morte, starring Richard Easton (and the film debuts of Nickolas Grace and Anthony Daniels), premiered at the Rotterdam Film Festival 1978 and was awarded the Critics Prize at the International Film Festival Ghent in 1980. LULU, starring Paul Shenar and Elisa Leonelli and adapted from the play by Frank Wedekind, was screened at the Berlin International Film Festival, Filmex, and Rotterdam Film Festival, among others. It was chosen as one of the three best films of 1978 by Pariscope, but could not be released because of a copyright conflict with the estate of Alban Berg.

== Film and projection in opera ==
Chase's first combined film and opera with director Richard Pearlman, then head of the Washington Opera, in a production of Britten's The Turn of the Screw (with Benita Velinti in her first dramatic role). Chase produced film and projections with Pearlman for the world premiere of The Who's Tommy at the Seattle Opera in 1971. Around this time Chase met director Frank Corsaro and their mutual interest in film led to their 40-year collaboration in opera, film and projection in a series of innovative productions including Berg's Lulu at the Houston Opera in 1975, Korngold's Die Tote Stadt at the New York City Opera in 1975, Poulenc's Les mamelles de Tirésias at the Opera Theater of St. Louis in 1983 and Strauss' Die Frau ohne Schatten at the Lyric Opera of Chicago in 1984. Due to injuries Corsaro suffered during a car crash, Gerald Freedman replaced him in collaborating with Chase on a production of Ginastera's Beatrix Cenci that opened the John F. Kennedy Center for the Performing Arts on September 10, 1971. The film Chase produced for Beatrix Cenci received the San Francisco Museum of Modern Art's first SECA award in film in 1972. Chase produced his first animated films for theater in collaboration with Maurice Sendak for Ravel's L'enfant et les sortilèges at Glyndebourne in 1987. In 1992 Chase and Corsaro reunited to produce Busoni's Doktor Faust at the New York City Opera.

== Educator ==
In 1993, Chase created the San Francisco Art & Film Program for Teenagers, a non-profit devoted to making the arts accessible and an important presence in young people's lives. The program developed out of Saturday gallery walks for students of San Francisco School of the Arts High School to include weekly film screenings, a film workshop, and free tickets to cultural events, available to all San Francisco Bay Area students. SF Art & Film has been cited as one of the most comprehensive art education programs in the United States, and continues to serve more than 600 young people a year.

== Filmography ==
- Fragments (1963)
- The Covenant (1965)
- Chameleon (1969)
- Clown (1969)
- Sally Simpson (1970)
- Parade (1971)
- A Village Romeo (1971)
- Cathedral (1971)
- SAN FRANCISCO CHRISTMAS BREAKFAST (1971)
- SCENE ONE TAKE ONE: Variations on a Man, a Woman and a Gun (1971)
- Beatrice Cenci (1972)
- Lulu (1978)
- Bruges-La-Morte (1978)
- FANTASIA on The Childhood of BUSONI (1981)
- Ball (2005)
- Tests I love to Take (2006)
- Jezebel (2006)
- Home (2007)
- FARBER (Color) (2019)

== Bibliography ==
- Maverick, by Frank Corsaro, The Vanguard Press, Inc, 1978. ISBN 0-8149-0790-3
