= Oh, What Times, Don Simon! =

1941 film

- Directed by: Julio Bracho
- Written by: Neftali Beltrán; Julio Bracho
- Produced by: Armando Espinosa; Agustín J. Fink
- Starring: Joaquín Pardavé; Arturo de Córdova; Mapy Cortés
- Cinematography: Gabriel Figueroa
- Edited by: Emilio Gómez Muriel
- Music by: Raúl Lavista
- Production company: Films Mundiales
- Distributed by: Films Mundiales
- Release date: 19 September 1941
- Running time: 102 minutes
- Country: Mexico
- Language: Spanish

Oh, What Times, Don Simon! (Spanish: ¡Ay, qué tiempos señor don Simón!) is a 1941 Mexican period musical comedy film directed by Julio Bracho and starring Joaquín Pardavé, Arturo de Córdova and Mapy Cortés. It was shot at the Clasa Studios in Mexico City. The film's sets were designed by the art director Jorge Fernández.

== Cast ==
- Joaquín Pardavé as Don Simón
- Arturo de Córdova as Miguel
- Mapy Cortés as Inés
- Anita Blanch as Beatriz de Alpuche
- Miguel Montemayor as Ramoncito
- Dolores Camarillo as Adelaida Méndez
- Agustín Isunza as Licenciado Alpuche
- Luis G. Barreiro as Oropeza, el poeta
- Consuelo Guerrero de Luna as Caritina Méndez
- José Ortiz de Zárate as Don Roque
- Diana Bordes as Josefina
- Carlos Martínez Baena as Cura Camacho
- María Luisa Carvajal as Tiple de ópera
- Paco Zarate as Tenor
- Chelo Villarreal as Coco Anchondo
- Víctor Velázquez as Amigo de Miguel
- Edmundo Espino as Comandante Rocha
- Armando Velasco as Sebastián, mayordomo
- David Valle González as Nicolas, cochero
- Humberto Rodríguez as Amigo de don Simón

== Bibliography ==
- Avila, Jaqueline. Cinesonidos: Film Music and National Identity During Mexico's Época de Oro. Oxford University Press, 2019.
- Riera, Emilio García. Julio Bracho, 1909-1978. Universidad de Guadalajara, 1986.
