= Rosauro Castro =

1950 film

- Directed by: Roberto Gavaldón
- Written by: Robert Quigley; Roberto Gavaldón; José Revueltas
- Produced by: Pedro Armendáriz; Roberto Gavaldón; César Santos Galindo
- Starring: Pedro Armendáriz; Carlos López Moctezuma; María Douglas
- Cinematography: Raúl Martínez Solares
- Edited by: George Crone
- Music by: Antonio Díaz Conde
- Production company: Cinematográfica Azteca
- Release date: 22 December 1950
- Running time: 90 minutes
- Country: Mexico
- Language: Spanish

Rosauro Castro is a 1950 Mexican drama film directed by Roberto Gavaldón and starring Pedro Armendáriz, Carlos López Moctezuma and María Douglas. It was shot at the Azteca Studios in Mexico City. The film's sets were designed by the art director Gunther Gerzso.

== Cast ==
- Pedro Armendáriz as Rosauro Castro
- Carlos López Moctezuma as Don Antonio, presidente municipal
- María Douglas as Marta
- Carlos Navarro as Chabelo Campos
- Arturo Martínez as Lic. García Maza
- Mimí Derba as Doña Margarita, madre de Rosauro
- Enriqueta Reza as Madre de Pedro Cardoza
- Antonio del Puerto as Ángel Castro - hijo de Rosauro
- Rogelio Fernández as Fidel, esbirro de Rosauro
- Isabel del Puerto as Esperanza
- Conchita Gentil Arcos as Señora Campos, madre de Chabelo
- Rosa María Ladrón de Guevara as Celia
- Ignacio Villalbazo as Sabino, esbirro de Rosauro
- Agustín Fernández as Rubén, hermano de Pedro
- Salvador Godínez as Hermano de Pedro

== Bibliography ==
- Hershfield, Joanne; Maciel, David R. Mexico's Cinema: A Century of Film and Filmmakers. Rowman & Littlefield Publishers, 1999.
- Stock, Anne Marie (ed.) Framing Latin American Cinema: Contemporary Critical Perspectives. University of Minnesota Press, 1997.
