= Mis dos amores =

1938 film directed by Nick Grinde

- Poster for the film
- Directed by: Nick Grinde
- Screenplay by: Milton Raison
- Story by: José Antonio Miranda
- Produced by: Rafael Ramos Cobián
- Starring: Tito Guízar; Blanca de Castejón; Emilia Leovalli
- Cinematography: Arthur Martinelli
- Edited by: Martin G. Cohn
- Music by: Ernesto González
- Production company: Cobian Productions
- Distributed by: Paramount Pictures
- Release date: August 11, 1938 (US)
- Running time: 58 minutes
- Country: United States
- Language: Spanish

Mis dos amores is a 1938 American Spanish-language drama film. Directed by Nick Grinde, the film stars Tito Guízar, Blanca de Castejón, and Emilia Leovalli. It was previewed in New York City on August 11, 1938, and opened in San Juan, Puerto Rico on October 4. During production, its working title was Mi primer amor, and it was the first of a series of films produced by U.S. film studios aimed at the Spanish-language market in North and South America.

== Cast list ==
- Tito Guízar as Julio Bertolin
- Blanca de Castejón as Rita Santiago
- Emilia Leovalli as Mercedes Bertolin
- Romualdo Tirado as Rafael Bertolin
- Juan Torena as District attorney José Miranda
- Carolina Segrera as Ana Celia Ramos
- Carlos Villarías as Don Antonio Santiago
- Evelyn Del Rio as Anita Ramos
- Paul Ellis as El Chato
- Martin Garralaga as Alfonso Hernández
