= Mapy Cortés =

Puerto Rican actress (1910–1998)

- Born: María del Pilar Cordero; March 1, 1910; Santurce, San Juan, Puerto Rico
- Died: August 2, 1998 (aged 88); Isla Verde, Puerto Rico
- Occupation: Actress
- Years active: 1933–1986
- Spouse: Fernando Cortés

Maria del Pilar Cordero (March 1, 1910 – August 2, 1998), better known as Mapy Cortés, was a Puerto Rican actress who acted in many films during the Golden Age of Mexican cinema. She also performed in Spain, Cuba, Argentina, Peru, Ecuador.. Besides this, she also performed as a singer and producer. Cortés was known by her nickname of Novia de América.

== Biography ==
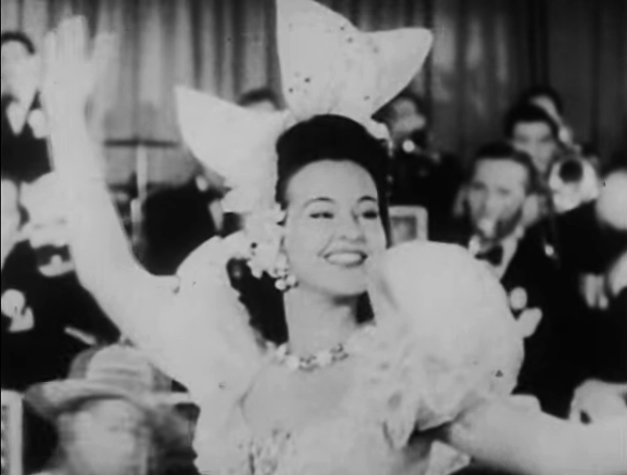
Mapy in the 1942 RKO film Seven Days Leave

Cortés appeared in the U.S. State Department propaganda short film "Mexican Moods".

She was born María del Pilar Cordero Berrios on March 1, 1910, in San Juan. Cortés first became involved with media in the radio of Puerto Rico. She also performed in theatre. In 1933, Cortés was cast in the Spanish film Dos Mujeres y un Don Juan. She remained in this country, later appearing in El Paraíso Recobrado two years later. In 1936, Cortés appeared in several films including No me Mates, Gato Montes and Amor Gitano. In the latter she met fellow Puerto Rican actor Fernando Cortés, whom she would marry and take his last name. In 1937, she appeared in ¡Centinela, alerta!. This was followed by zarzuelas Las Tandas del Principal, En Tiempos de Don Porfirio, La Hija del Regimiento and El Globo de Cantoya. In Argentina she appeared in Un tipo de suerte. Cortés' final production in Spain was Un tipo con suerte, released in 1938. She left the country after the outbreak of the Spanish Civil War. Working in Cuba, Cortés performed in Ahora seremos felices.

In 1941, she debuted in Mexico with La liga de las canciones, her first role portraying a Puerto Rican. Her films sold well and were followed by El Conde de Monte Cristo, Internado para Señoritas and Las Cinco Noches de Adán. She and Fernando would produce films throughout Latin American during the following decade, with his husband first directing her in La Pícara Susana, which was followed by La Corte del Faraón and La Posada del Caballo Blanco.

In 1942, Cortés made her only foray into Hollywood cinema, playing a singer in the RKO wartime musical comedy Seven Days' Leave. Her eponymous character is engaged to Victor Mature's soldier character before he falls in love with a socialite played by Lucille Ball. Being fully bilingual, benefitted her during the production. During the promotion, a faux persona was created for her, claiming that she was a decade younger and single. Her performance was well received by critics and the movie sold well, but Cortés decided to return to Latin America citing the treatment with Hispanic actors.

After filming Seven Days Leave, Mapy Cortés returned to Mexico City and played roles in contemporary romantic comedies and nostalgia musicals set during the Mexican Belle Époque. The 1945 Mapy Cortés vehicle La pícara Susana / Mischievous Susana marked the directorial debut of her husband Fernando. In Puerto Rico, the couple was actively involved in the establishment of the first television station, WKAQ-TV. There, they debuted on March 28, 1954, with La Mujer Asesinadita, produced by her nephew Paquito Cordero. They went on to perform in the series Mapy y Papi. Both shows were comedies. In 1959, she appeared in Dormitorio para Señoritas. Cortés was also involved in her husband's co-productions with Mexican interests, which included Los Expatriados (1963). In 1986, Cortés appeared in the telenovela Marionetas along her niece Mapita.

== Personal life ==
Cortés adopted her niece Mapita Mercado, who would also take the surname Cortés. She moved along the couple and in 1958 debuted as an actress in Misterios de Ultratumba, later appearing in films and telenovelas. Years later, Olga San Juan would credit Cortés with inspiring her to become an actress.

After Fernando died, Mapy returned to Puerto Rico and led a relatively quiet life. In 1998 she died at her home of a heart attack. She was buried at the Puerto Rico Memorial Cemetery in Carolina, Puerto Rico.

== Filmography ==
- Dos mujeres y un don Juan / Two Women and a don Juan (1933, Spain)
- El paraíso recobrado / The Recovered Paradise (1935, Spain)
- No me mates / Don't Kill Me (1935, Spain)
- El gato montés / The Wildcat (1936, Spain)
- ¡Centinela, alerta! / Guard, Alert! (1936, Spain)
- El amor gitano / Gypsy Love (1936, Spain)
- Un tipo de suerte / A Lucky Guy (1938, Argentina)
- Ahora Seremos Felices / We Will Be Happy Now (1938, Cuba)
- Papá se desenreda / Dad Untangles (1940, Mexico)
- Cinco minutos de amor / Five Minutes of Love (1941, Mexico)
- ¡Ay, qué tiempos, señor don Simón! / Oh, What Times, Don Simon! (1941, Mexico)
- La liga de las canciones / The League of Songs (1941, Mexico)
- El gendarme desconocido / The Unknown Policeman (1941, Mexico)
- El conde de Monte Cristo / The Count of Monte Cristo (1942, Mexico)
- Las cinco noches de Adán / Adam's Five Nights (1942, Mexico)
- Seven Days' Leave (1942, United States)
- Yo bailé con Don Porfirio / I Danced with Don Porfirio (1942, Mexico)
- Internado para señoritas / Girls' Dormitory (1943, Mexico)
- El globo de Cantolla / Cantolla's Balloon (1943, Mexico)
- La corte del faraón / The Pharaoh's Court (1943, Mexico)
- La guerra de los pasteles / The War of the Pastries (1944, Mexico)
- La hija del regimiento / The Daughter of the Regiment (1944, Mexico)
- La pícara Susana / Mischievous Susana (1945, Mexico)
- Un beso en la noche / A Kiss at Night (1945, Mexico)
- Amor de una vida / Love of a Lifetime (1945, Mexico)
- El amor las vuelve locas / Love Makes Them Crazy (1946, Mexico)
- Los maridos engañan de 7 a 9 / Men Cheat from 7 to 9 (1946, Mexico)
- El sexo fuerte / The Stronger Sex (1946, Mexico)
- No te cases con mi mujer / Don't Marry My Wife (1947, Mexico)
- Al marido hay que seguirlo / A Husband Must Be Followed (1948, Argentina)
- Las tandas del Principal / The Shows at the Principal Theater (1949, Mexico)
- Recién casados... no molestar / Newlyweds.. Do Not Disturb (1950, Mexico)
- Venezuela también canta / Venezuela Also Sings (1951, Venezuela)
- Lamento borincano / Puerto Rican Lament (1963, Mexico/Puerto Rico co-production)
- En mi viejo San Juan / In My Old San Juan (1965, Mexico/Puerto Rico co-production)
- Luna de miel en Puerto Rico / Honeymoon in Puerto Rico (1966, Mexico/Puerto Rico co-production)

== See also ==
- List of Puerto Ricans

== Bibliography ==
- Agrasánchez Jr., Rogelio (2001). Bellezas del cine mexicano/Beauties of Mexican Cinema. Archivo Fílmico Agrasánchez. ISBN 968-5077-11-8.
- Ortiz, Roberto Carlos. "Puerto Rican Sugar: The Transnational Film Career of Mapy Cortés." Centro Journal 17.1 (Spring 2005): 122-139.
- Rivera, Miluka (2010). Legado Puertorriqueño en Hollywood: Famosos y Olvidados. Kumaras Center for the Arts and Etiquette. ISBN 9780578069937.
