= Peter, Paul and Nanette =

- Directed by: Erich Engels
- Written by: Erich Engels
- Starring: Hermann Thimig; Hans Junkermann; Hilde Krüger
- Cinematography: Hugo von Kaweczynski
- Edited by: Paul May
- Music by: Franz Grothe
- Production company: Tobis Film
- Distributed by: Union-Tonfilm-Produktion
- Release date: 15 January 1935
- Country: Germany
- Language: German

Peter, Paul and Nanette (German: Peter, Paul und Nanette) is a 1935 German comedy film directed by Erich Engels and starring Hermann Thimig, Hans Junkermann and Hilde Krüger.

== Cast ==
- Hermann Thimig as Peter Pellmann / Paul Polter
- Hans Junkermann as Arthur Bergmann
- Hilde Krüger as Nanette, seine Tochter
- Olga Limburg as Ida, seine Schwester
- Paul Heidemann as Martin Götz
- Hilde Hildebrand as Mary
- Paul Henckels as Professor Leblanc
- Jakob Tiedtke as Sebastian
- Wolfgang von Schwindt as Max
- Hans Richter as Fritz
- Paula Denk as Adele
- Jupp Hussels as Verleger

== Bibliography ==
- Waldman, Harry. Nazi Films In America, 1933-1942. McFarland & Co, 2008.
