= Don't Lose Heart, Suzanne! =

1935 film

- German film poster
- German: Nur nicht weich werden, Susanne!
- Directed by: Arzén von Cserépy
- Written by: Peter Hagen (novel); Hans Hömberg; Georg Mühlen-Schulte; Gerd Tolzien
- Starring: Jessie Vihrog; Veit Harlan; Willi Schur
- Cinematography: Guido Seeber
- Edited by: Willy Zeunert
- Music by: Erwin Offeney; Marc Roland
- Production company: Cserepy-Tonfilmproduktion
- Distributed by: Normalton-Film
- Release date: 24 January 1935
- Country: Germany
- Language: German

Don't Lose Heart, Suzanne! (German: Nur nicht weich werden, Susanne!) is a 1935 German drama film directed by Arzén von Cserépy, and starring Jessie Vihrog, Veit Harlan, and Willi Schur.

== Plot ==
The film takes place in the film milieu towards the end of the Weimar Republic against the background of the world economic crisis. The title character Susanne is an unemployed extra who, through an assistant director, finds a supporting role in the kitsch film Love Me in Honolulu. The producers are Jews who are portrayed as greedy and lustful and at the same time run an illegal casino. When a visitor commits suicide, the film producers kidnap Susanne and another actress as a distraction. Georg, Susanne's fiancé, frees the women. Together, they try to prove the guilt of the producers. When the National Socialists seize power, the producers are arrested and Susanne and Georg become a married couple.

== Background ==
The film's sets were designed by the art directors Erich Grave and Karl Vollbrecht. The film offered support to the Nazi Party's anti-Semitic stance by a negative portrayal of the two Jewish film producers. It received strong official backing, and a gala premiere was arranged for its release by Joseph Goebbels. To Goebbels' surprise and disgust, the first night audience booed, once the screening was over. The incident was largely hushed-up, and the film's director Arzén von Cserépy went back to his native Hungary in disgrace and never made another German film.

The film was a success, however, for the young actress Hilde Krüger. Following this film, she was given the patronage of Goebbels. She was to appear in twenty more films, and went on to be a spy for Germany.

== Cast ==
- Jessie Vihrog as Susanne Kirchner
- Veit Harlan as Georg Brinkmann
- Willi Schur as General manager Sally Gold
- Ernst Rotmund as Production manager Archinowitz
- Maly Delschaft as Hilde Keller
- Harry Frank as Tommy Silver
- Eugen Rex as director
- Hans Adalbert Schlettow as detective
- Rotraut Richter as Grete
- Ellen Bang as Lilli
- Josef Dahmen as Kurvenkarl
- Heinz Berghaus
- Gerhard Dammann
- Josefine Dora as Aunt Frieda
- Hugo Flink as editor
- Aribert Grimmer as commissioner
- Karl Harbacher
- Max Hochstetter
- Maria Krahn
- Hilde Krüger
- Hermann Picha
- Karl Platen
- Max Ralph-Ostermann as Schmidt - Lawyer
- Carla Rust
- Ernst Albert Schaach as Vice president
- Robert Thiem as Fredy Miller - director's assistant
