= Prudencia Grifell =

Spanish actress (1879–1970)

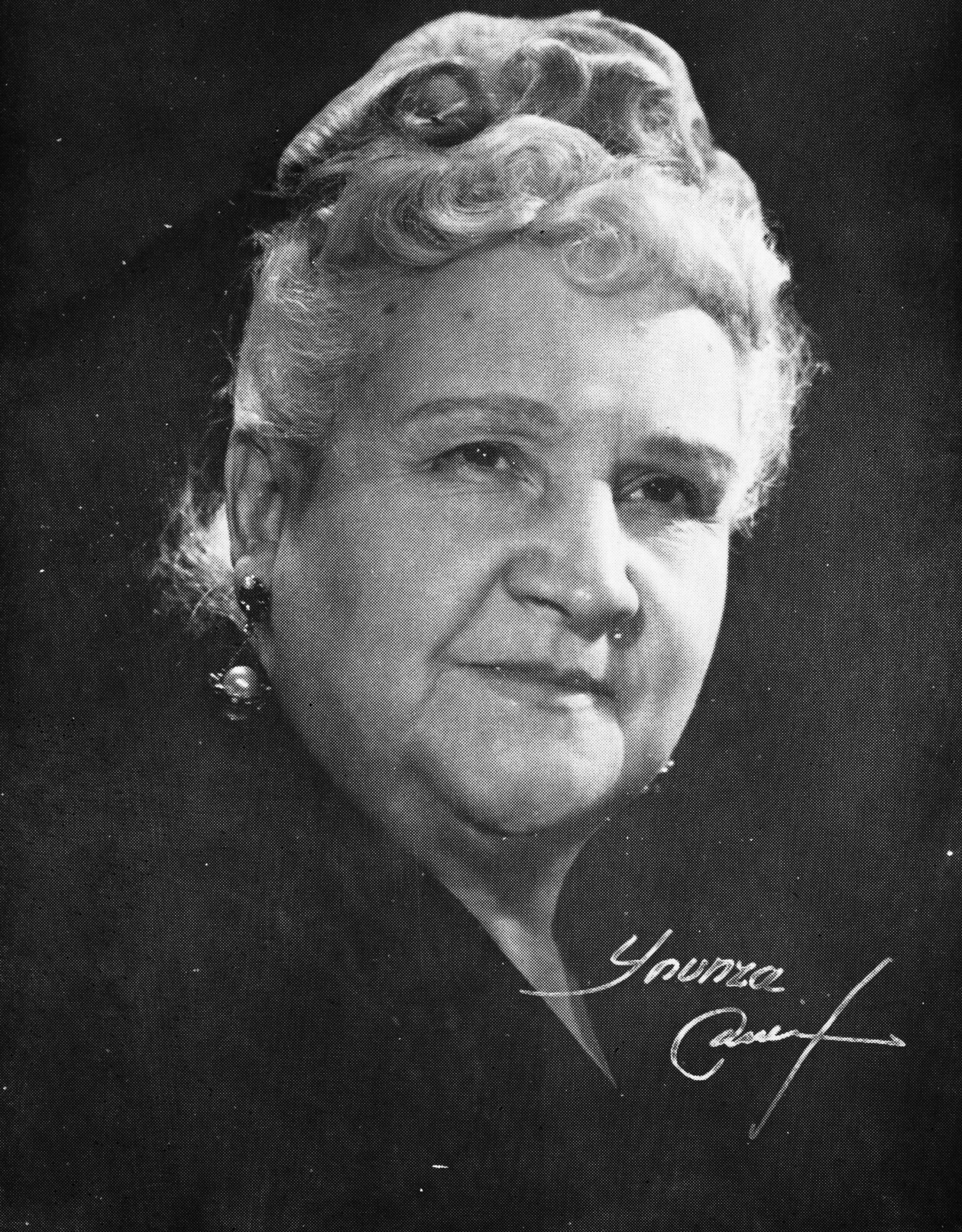
- Grifell in 1954
- Born: Prudencia María Victoria Grifell Masip; 27 December 1879; Lugo, Galicia, Spain
- Died: 7 June 1970 (aged 90); Mexico City, Mexico
- Resting place: Panteón Jardín, Mexico City
- Occupation: Actress
- Spouse: Paco Martinez (?-1956) (his death)
- Children: 5
- Awards: Ariel Award for Best Actress in a Minor Role; 1954 La Sexta Carrera; Ariel Award for Best Actress; 1956 Una Mujer en la Calle

Prudencia María Victoria Grifell Masip (27 December 1879 – 7 June 1970) was a Spanish actress and comedian.

== Telenovelas ==
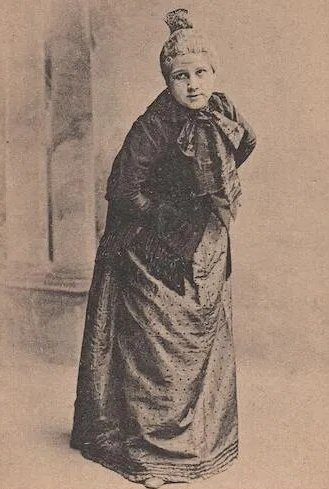
Grifell, c. 1904

- Plegaria en el camino (1969)
- Estafa de amor (1967)
- El despertar (1966) as Doña Remedios
- Sonata de otoño (1966)
- Las abuelas (1965)
- Corona de lágrimas (1964)
- Tres caras de mujer (1963)
- Borrasca (1962)
- La cobarde (1962)
- La madrastra (1962)
- Estafa de amor (1961)
- La leona (1961)
- Niebla (1961)
- Pensión de mujeres (1960)

== Films ==
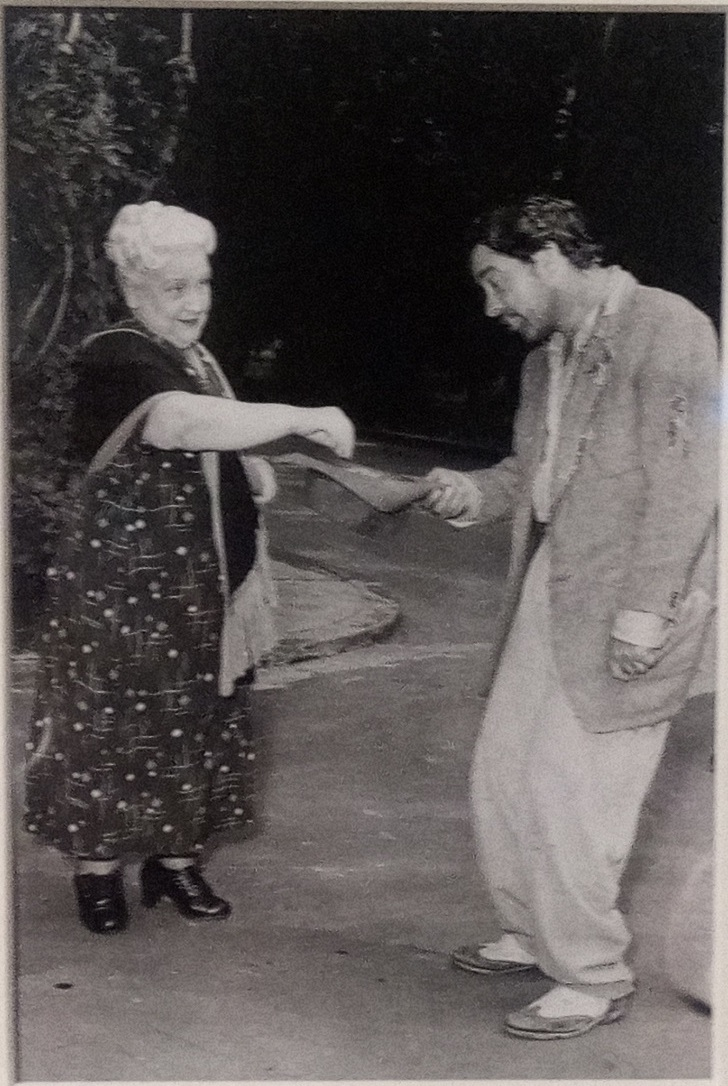
Grifell with Tin Tan in Escuela para suegras (1958)

- ¿Por qué nací mujer? (1970) as Doña Rosa
- Valses venían de Viena y los niños de París (1966)
- El señor doctor (1965)
- Caperucita y sus tres amigos (1961) as Red Riding Hood's Grandmother
- Senda prohibida (1961)
- ¡Mis abuelitas... nomás! (1961) as Paz
- Proceso de las señoritas Vivanco (1961)
- The White Sister (1960)
- La caperucita roja (1960) as Red Riding Hood's Grandmother
- La sombra del caudillo (1960) as Dueña del burdel
- Las señoritas Vivanco (1959) as Teresa Vivanco
- México nunca duerme (1959)
- La sonrisa de la Virgen (1958) as Marita's Grandmother
- El hombre que me gusta (1958) as Dona Rosa
- Raffles mexicano (1958)
- Préstame tu cuerpo (1958)
- Escuela para suegras (1958)
- Mi desconocida esposa (1958)
- Horas de agonía (1958)
- Pepito y el monstruo (1957)
- Pies de gato (1957)
- El organillero (1957)
- Sublime melodía (1956) as Doña Irene Angustias García Medina de López Mendía
- Pensión de artistas (1956)
- La tercera palabra (1956) as Angelina
- Viva la juventud (1956)
- Cara de ángel (1956)
- The Bandits of Cold River (1956)
- Tres melodías de amor (1955)
- After the Storm (1955)
- La fuerza del deseo (1955)
- El caso de la mujer asesinadita (1955)
- El plagiario (1955)
- The Murderer X (1955)
- El monstruo en la sombra (1955)
- Al diablo las mujeres (1955)
- Necesito un marido (1955)
- Una mujer en la calle (1955) as Nena
- Prisionera del pasado (1954)
- Un minuto de bondad (1954)
- When I Leave (1954)
- Ladrona (1954)
- Los dineros del diablo (1953)
- La sexta carrera (1953)
- Las infieles (1953/I)
- Seven Women (1953)
- Women Who Work (1953)
- Póker de ases (1952)
- Sister Alegría (1952)
- Genial Detective Peter Pérez (1952)
- El ruiseñor del barrio (1952) as Eugenia Castillejos
- Aquellos ojos verdes (1952)
- Dos caras tiene el destino (1952)
- My Adorable Savage (1952)
- Lodo y armiño (1951)
- María Cristina (1951)
- The Guests of the Marquesa (1951)
- Historia de un corazón (1951) as the school's principal
- Peregrina (1951)
- Recién casados... no molestar (1951)
- Tenement House (1951)
- Between Your Love and Heaven (1950)
- Ciclón del Caribe (1950)
- Immaculate (1950) as Dona Rosa
- Over the Waves (1950) as Calixta Gutiérrez de Alfaro
- Wife or Lover (1950)
- Nuestras vidas (1950)
- La dama del alba (1950) as María
- Ladronzuela (1949)
- Nosotros los rateros (1949)
- El miedo llegó a Jalisco (1949)
- Autumn and Spring (1949)
- Contra la ley de Dios (1949)
- La casa de la Troya (1948)
- Barrio de pasiones (1948)
- Soledad (1947)
- El amor abrió los ojos (1947)
- Los nietos de Don Venancio (1946)
- Sombra en mi destino (1946)
- La culpable (1946)
- Corazones de México (1945)
- Sierra Morena (1945)
- Adulterio (1945)
- Viejo nido (1944)
- El globo de Cantoya (1943)
- Internado para señoritas (1943)

== See also ==
- Foreign-born artists in Mexico
