= Immaculate (1950 film) =

1950 film

- Directed by: Julio Bracho
- Written by: Catalina D'Erzell (novel); Julio Bracho
- Produced by: Jesús Grovas
- Starring: Rosario Granados; Carlos López Moctezuma; Eduardo Noriega
- Cinematography: Raúl Martínez Solares
- Edited by: Gloria Schoemann
- Music by: Manuel Esperón
- Production company: Producciónes Grovas
- Distributed by: Producciónes Grovas
- Release date: 15 September 1950
- Running time: 126 minutes
- Country: Mexico
- Language: Spanish

Immaculate (Spanish: Inmaculada) is a 1950 Mexican drama film directed and co-written by Julio Bracho and starring Rosario Granados, Carlos López Moctezuma and Eduardo Noriega. It was shot at the Churubusco Studios in Mexico City. The film's sets were designed by the art director Jesús Bracho.

== Cast ==
- Rosario Granados as Consuelo
- Carlos López Moctezuma as Jorge Villagran
- Eduardo Noriega as Luis Angel
- Eva Martino as Lucia
- Prudencia Grifell as Dona Rosa
- Delia Magaña as Severina
- Mimí Derba as madre de Luis Angel
- Tana Lynn as La seductora
- Maruja Grifell as Madame
- Lupita Llaca as Rosalia
- Elda Peralta as Guillermina Perea
- Diana Ochoa as Merceditas, tendera
- Armando Arriola as Nacho
- Armando Velasco as Doctor
- Luis Mussot as Don Carlos
- Enrique Díaz 'Indiano' as Doctor
- Diana Bracho as Rosalía
- Ismael Pérez as Monchito
- Juan Orraca
- Nicolás Rodríguez
- Julieta Rubio
- Emma Fink
- Elda Martinez
- Mariano Requena
- Jesús Valero
- Roger Aaron Brown

== Bibliography ==
- Rogelio Agrasánchez. Cine Mexicano: Posters from the Golden Age, 1936-1956. Chronicle Books, 2001.
