= El diablo no es tan diablo =

- Directed by: Julián Soler
- Written by: Fernando Morales Ortiz; Julián Soler
- Produced by: Alfredo Ripstein
- Starring: Sara García; Julián Soler; Amparo Morillo; Fernando Soto
- Cinematography: Víctor Herrera
- Edited by: Carlos Savage
- Music by: Rosalío Ramírez; Federico Ruiz
- Production company: Alameda Films
- Distributed by: Alameda Films
- Release date: October 26, 1949
- Running time: 95 minutes
- Country: Mexico
- Language: Spanish

El diablo no es tan diablo is a 1949 Mexican fantasy comedy film directed by Julián Soler and produced by Alfredo Ripstein. It starred Sara García, Julián Soler, Amparo Morillo, and Fernando Soto. It was the first Mexican featured film that combined live-action and animation sequences.

== Plot ==
A bickering couple is visited by the devil, who suggests they switch roles to experience what the other does. He will take her place and stay home, and she will go to the office.

== Cast ==
- Amparo Morillo
- Emperatriz Carvajal
- Julián Soler
- Sara García
