= Hilde Krüger =

German actress

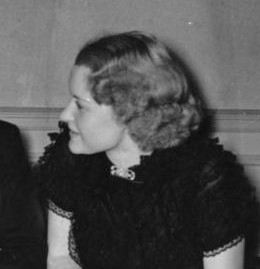
- Krüger in 1938.
- Born: 9 November 1912; Cologne, Germany
- Died: 8 May 1991 (aged 78); Lichtenfels, Germany
- Other names: Katerina Matilde Krüger; Hilda Krüger
- Occupation: Actress
- Years active: 1934–1958 (film)

Hilde Krüger (9 November 1912 – 8 May 1991) was a German film actress who eventually settled in Mexico.

== Life ==
Krüger was born in 1912. One source says she was born in Cologne while another claims her birth occurred in Berlin on 11 September 1914. Her dramatic success was assigned to the patronage of Joseph Goebbels, which happened after she appeared in the anti-Semitic film Don't Lose Heart, Suzanne! She appeared in twenty more films.

She is suspected of working as a spy for the Abwehr, the German intelligence department during the Second World War. She allegedly cultivated leading figures in Mexican society, including Undersecretary of the Treasury Ramón Beteta Quintana and Secretary of the Interior (and future president) Miguel Alemán Valdés. She had intended to settle in Hollywood, but she struggled to find work and had to leave for Mexico.

She died in 1991 on a visit to Germany; the death certificate lists her residence as an apartment in New York City.

== Selected filmography ==
- Playing with Fire (1934)
- She and the Three (1935)
- Stradivari (1935)
- Peter, Paul and Nanette (1935)
- Don't Lose Heart, Suzanne! (1935)
- Incognito (1936)
- The Man Who Couldn't Say No (1938)
- He Who Died of Love (1945)
- Adultery (1945)

== Bibliography ==
- Kenneth Schuyler Lynn. Charlie Chaplin and His Times. Simon and Schuster, 1997.
