= The Sixth Race =

1953 film by Miguel M. Delgado

- Directed by: Miguel M. Delgado
- Written by: Jorge Andere Dáher; Ramón Pérez Peláez
- Produced by: Eduardo Galindo; Jesús Galindo
- Starring: Rosario Granados
- Cinematography: Agustín Jiménez
- Edited by: José W. Bustos
- Music by: José de la Vega
- Production company: Producciones Galindo Hermanos
- Release date: 24 July 1953
- Country: Mexico
- Language: Spanish

The Sixth Race (Spanish: La sexta carrera) is a 1953 Mexican drama film directed by Miguel M. Delgado and starring Rosario Granados. It is set in the world of horse racing.

== Cast ==
- Amparo Arozamena
- Manolo Fábregas
- Rosario Granados
- Prudencia Grifell
- Wolf Ruvinskis
- Andrés Soler
- Fernando Soto "Mantequilla"
- Manuel Sánchez Navarro

== See also ==
- List of films about horses
- List of films about horse racing

== Bibliography ==
- María Luisa Amador. Cartelera cinematográfica, 1950-1959. UNAM, 1985.
