= Women Who Work (1953 film) =

1953 film by Julio Bracho

- Directed by: Julio Bracho
- Written by: Julio Alejandro; Julio Bracho; Edmundo Báez; Egon Eis
- Produced by: Sergio Kogan
- Starring: Rosita Quintana; Columba Dominguez; Alberto Carrière
- Cinematography: Alex Phillips
- Edited by: Jorge Busto
- Music by: Raúl Lavista
- Production company: Filmex
- Release date: 22 April 1953
- Running time: 99 minutes
- Country: Mexico
- Language: Spanish

Women Who Work (Spanish: Mujeres que trabajan) is a 1953 Mexican drama film directed by Julio Bracho and starring Rosita Quintana, Columba Dominguez and Alberto Carrière.

The film's art direction was by Jesús Bracho, who was the younger brother of the director.

== Cast ==
- Rosita Quintana as Claudia Sandoval
- Columba Domínguez as Isabel Villada
- Alberto Carrière as Alfredo Berman
- Andrea Palma as Laura Rosales
- Prudencia Grifell as Srita. Benavides
- Eva Martino as Perla Medina
- Anabelle Gutiérrez as Gloria Esparza
- Emperatriz Carvajal as Margarita
- Maruja Grifell as Espectadora desfile de modas
- Diana Ochoa as Empleada de Laura
- Rosario Gutiérrez as Lupe
- Patricia de Morelos as Modelo
- Irlanda Mora as Chica en pensión

== Bibliography ==
- Deborah R. Vargas. Dissonant Divas in Chicana Music: The Limits of la Onda. University of Minnesota Press, 2012.
