= Emilio Gómez Muriel =

Mexican film director (1910–1985)

Emilio Gómez Muriel was a prolific Mexican film director, active between the 1930s and the 1970s.

He is known for melodramas, but one of his first films was Redes (release: 1936), an attempt at social cinema with a mostly non-professional cast.

He won an award at the 1960 San Sebastian Film Festival for Simitrio.

== Selected filmography ==
- While Mexico Sleeps (1938)
- Café Concordia (1939)
- The 9.15 Express (1941)
- The Unknown Policeman (1941)
- Oh, What Times, Don Simon! (1941)
- When the Stars Travel (1942)
- Alejandra (1942)
- Another Dawn (1943)
- The War of the Pastries (1944)
- The Lieutenant Nun (1944)
- The Stronger Sex (1946)
- Nocturne of Love (1948)
- The Woman of the Port (1949)
- When the Night Ends (1950)
- Engagement Ring (1951)
- A Galician Dances the Mambo (1951)
- Carne de presidio (1952)
- Between Your Love and Heaven (1950)
- The Woman You Want (1952)
- A Divorce (1953)
- The Three Elenas (1954)
- The Empty Star (1958)
- La cigüeña distraída (1966)
- Rocambole contra las mujeres arpías (1967)
- Rocambole contra la secta del escorpión (1967)
- La Cama (1968)
- La Buscona (1970)

More of his films are the subject of articles on Spanish Wikipedia.
