= Paula Denk =

German actress

Paula Denk (German: [ˈpaʊ̯la dɛŋk]; 18 January 1908 in Namibia – 9 January 1978 in Munich) was a German actress. She was a star of stage, screen, radio and television whose career spanned five decades.

Denk’s list of acting credits begins in the 1930s, with films such as The Love Hotel (1933, as Lilo), Escapade (1936, as Vera, the bride) and the comedy Peter, Paul and Nanette (1935, as Adele), in which she was described as “a slender brunette, especially attractive as a pert maid” in a 1940 New York Times review.

During this period she also appeared in many stage productions, and was immortalized as one of the stars featured in a now-collectible set of cigarette cards in 1936, along with such popular international stars of the day as Marlene Dietrich and Cary Grant.

Denk was part of a circle that included writer Klaus Mann and famous actor/director Gustaf Gründgens. Among collaborations between Gründgens and Denk is a 1948 stage production of Anton Chekhov’s The Seagull, in which they starred as Trigorin and Irina. In 1951, Denk played Lavinia Chamberlayne in a radio adaptation of TS Eliot’s play The Cocktail Party (staged as Die Cocktail Party). Gründgens directed the production, which also starred his ex-wife, Marianne Hoppe. Recordings of the play remain available today.

In the 1950s, Denk began appearing in television roles, highlighted by a performance as Margot in Besuch aus der Zone (1958), and Leonida in Ein Tag in Paris (1966), in which Denk co-starred with Horst Tappert, who in 1975 would invite her to appear in an episode of his popular and long-running hit series, Derrick. Denk also appeared as Frau Price-Ridley in a popular adaptation of Agatha Christie’s The Murder at the Vicarage, produced in German as Mord im Pfarrhaus (1970).

== Selected filmography ==
- The Love Hotel (1933)
- Rosen aus dem Süden (1934)
- Peter, Paul and Nanette (1935)
- Family Parade (1936)
- Escapade (1936)
- Das Konzert (1956, TV film)
- Besuch aus der Zone (1958, TV film)
- Geliebt in Rom (1963, TV film)
- Ein Tag in Paris (1966, TV film)
- Mord in Pfarrhaus (1970, TV film)
- Derrick - Season 2, Episode 4: "Madeira" (1975)
