= Carlos López Moctezuma =

Mexican actor

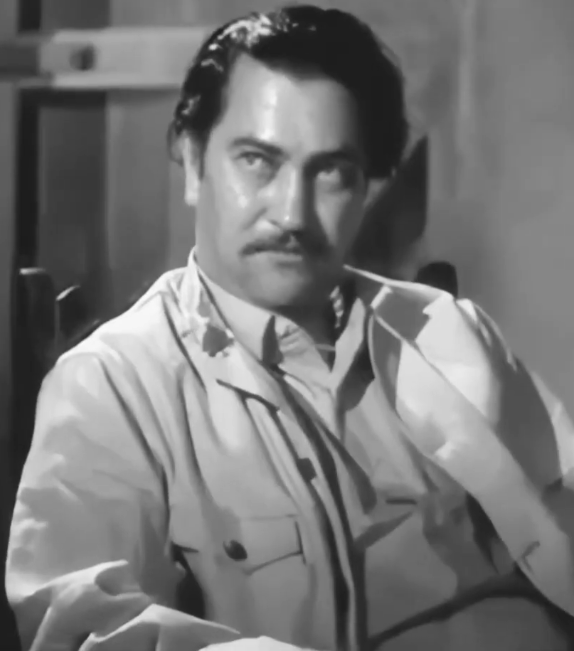
- Moctezuma in Canaima (1945)
- Born: Carlos López Moctezuma Pineda; 19 November 1909; Mexico City, Mexico
- Died: 14 July 1980 (aged 70); Aguascalientes, Mexico
- Occupation: Actor
- Years active: 1938–1980

Carlos López Moctezuma Pineda (19 November 1909 – 14 July 1980) was a Mexican film actor. He appeared in more than 210 films between 1938 and 1980. He starred in the film Happiness, which was entered into the 7th Berlin International Film Festival.

== Selected filmography ==
- Dos cadetes (1938)
- Three Peasants on a Donkey (1939)
- The Whip (1939)
- I Will Live Again (1940)
- The Unknown Policeman (1941)
- The 9.15 Express (1941)
- The Rock of Souls (1942)
- The Count of Monte Cristo (1942)
- Simón Bolívar (1942)
- Red Konga (1943)
- Christopher Columbus (1943)
- Lightning in the South (1943)
- A Woman of the East (1946)
- The Queen of the Tropics (1946)
- Hidden River (1948)
- Maclovia (1948)
- The Shadow of the Bridge (1948)
- Angels of the Arrabal (1949)
- Midnight (1949)
- Immaculate (1950)
- Rosauro Castro (1950)
- María Montecristo (1951)
- The Shrew (1951)
- The Trace of Some Lips (1952)
- The Naked Woman (1953)
- A Divorce (1953)
- The Proud and the Beautiful (1953)
- Take Me in Your Arms (1954)
- The Murderer X (1955)
- Happiness (1957)
- Una cita de amor (1958)
- La maldición de la llorona (1961)
- House of Women (1966)
- A Faithful Soldier of Pancho Villa (1967)
- La Gran Aventura Del Zorro (1976)
- Perro callejero (1978)
- Como México no hay dos (1979)
