= Qué hombre tan simpático =

- Starring: Carlos Orellana
- Release date: 1943
- Country: Mexico
- Language: Spanish

Qué hombre tan simpático is a 1943 Mexican film directed by Fernando Soler. It stars Carlos Orellana, Fernando Soler, Gloria Marín, Blanca de Castejón, Carlos Villarías, Rafael Banquells, Carolina Barret and Aurora Segura. It is a film adaptation of a play by Carlos Arniches.
