= The Trace of Some Lips =

1952 film

- Directed by: Juan Bustillo Oro
- Written by: Juan Bustillo Oro
- Based on: Collared by Cornell Woolrich
- Produced by: Jesús Grovas
- Starring: Rosario Granados; Carlos López Moctezuma; Rubén Rojo
- Cinematography: Raúl Martínez Solares
- Edited by: Gloria Schoemann
- Music by: Manuel Esperón
- Production company: Cinematográfica Grovas
- Release date: 6 March 1952
- Running time: 90 minutes
- Country: Mexico
- Language: Spanish

The Trace of Some Lips (Spanish: La huella de unos labios) is a 1952 Mexican mystery crime thriller film directed by Juan Bustillo Oro and starring Rosario Granados, Carlos López Moctezuma and Rubén Rojo. A film noir, it is based on a story by the American writer Cornell Woolrich. It was shot at the Churubusco Studios in Mexico City. The film's sets were designed by the art director Javier Torres Torija. It was a commercial success.

== Synopsis ==
After the mysterious death of her father, María is taken in by an acquaintance of his and lives in his house. She slowly gathers evidence that he may in fact be her father's murderer.

== Cast ==
- Rosario Granados as María
- Carlos López Moctezuma as César Villa
- Rubén Rojo as Felipe Rivas
- Luis Beristáin as Manuel Andrade
- Gilberto González as Luis Cortés
- Roberto Y. Palacios as Lee
- Humberto Rodríguez as Mesero
- Kika Meyer as Amante de Villa
- María Luisa Cortés as Empleada cabaret
- Jesús Gómez Murguía as Policía

== Bibliography ==
- Brill, Olaf (ed.) Expressionism in the Cinema. Edinburgh University Press, 2016.
- Piccato, Pablo. A History of Infamy: Crime, Truth, and Justice in Mexico. University of California Press, 2017.
- Reyes, Alvaro A. Fernández . Crimen y suspenso en el cine mexicano 1946-1955. El Colegio de Michoacán, 2007.
