= Ángel Garasa =

Spanish-Mexican actor

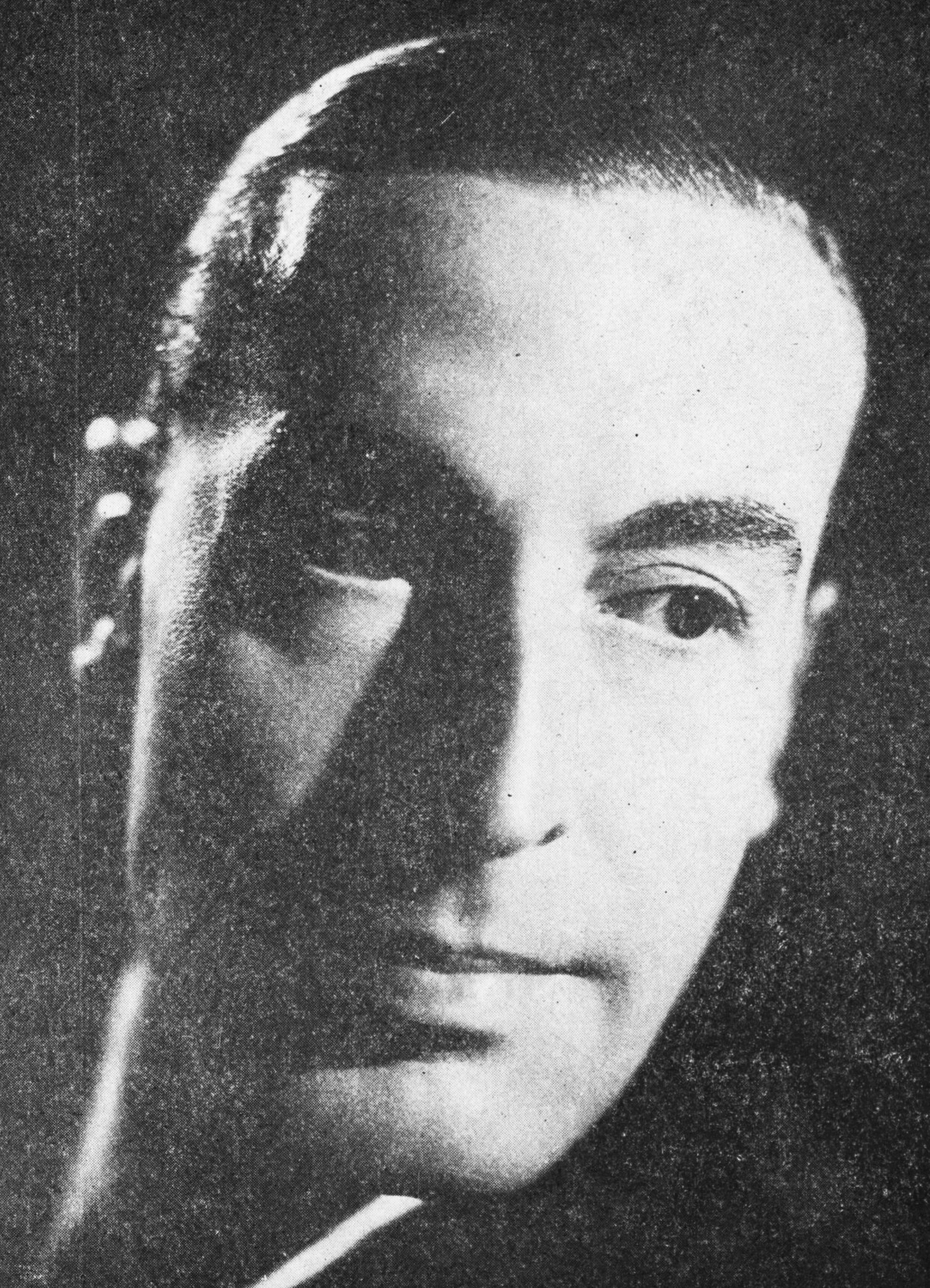
- Ángel Garasa in 1945
- Born: Ángel Garasa Bergés; 12 December 1905; Madrid, Spain
- Died: 27 August 1976 (aged 70); Mexico City, Mexico
- Occupation: Actor
- Years active: 1937–1976 (film)

Ángel Garasa Bergés (12 December 1905 – 27 August 1976) was a Spanish-Mexican film actor. Garasa was born in Madrid and emigrated to Mexico in 1937, fleeing the Spanish Civil War.

== Selected filmography ==
- Five Minutes of Love (1941)
- When the Stars Travel (1942)
- The Three Musketeers (1942)
- Beautiful Michoacán (1943)
- Romeo and Juliet (1943)
- El Ametralladora (1943)
- Caminito alegre (1944)
- The Lieutenant Nun (1944)
- Boom in the Moon (1946)
- The Stronger Sex (1946)
- Fly Away, Young Man! (1947)
- A Gypsy in Jalisco (1947)
- La casa de la Troya (1948)
- Doña Clarines (1951)
- You Had To Be a Gypsy (1953)
- The Photographer (1953)
- A Tailored Gentleman (1954)
- The Fair of the Dove (1963)
- Scandal in the Family (1967)
- Un Quijote sin mancha (1969)
- Las golfas (1969)
- The Rebellious Novice (1971)
- Poor But Honest (1973)

== Bibliography ==
- Pilcher, Jeffrey M. Cantinflas and the Chaos of Mexican Modernity. Rowman & Littlefield, 2001.
