= Emperatriz Carvajal =

Chilean actress

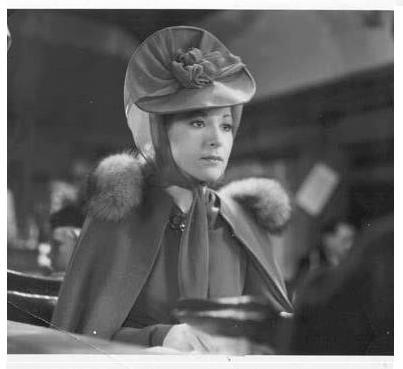
Emperatriz Carvajal in 1939

Emperatriz Carvajal (born in Chile; died in Mexico) was a Chilean actress and singer who worked extensively in Argentina and Mexico.

== Filmography ==
- 1935: Patrulla de avanzada
- 1938: La estancia del gaucho Cruz
- 1939: El sobretodo de Céspedes
- 1939: Our Land of Peace
- 1939: Caminito de gloria
- 1940: A Thief Has Arrived
- 1940: ¿Dónde está tu mujer?
- 1941: Un hombre bueno
- 1945: The Stronger Sex
- 1945: Las casadas engañan de 4 a 6
- 1946: Lágrimas de sangre
- 1949: El diablo no es tan diablo
- 1950: Menores de edad
- 1951: Historia de un corazón
- 1952: Si yo fuera diputado
- 1952: lsla de mujeres
- 1952: If I Were a Congressman
- 1953: Women Who Work
- 1953: Doña Mariquita de mi corazón
- 1953: Las infieles
- 1953: Lo que no se puede perdonar!..
- 1954: Yo no creo en los hombres
- 1955: Música, espuelas y amor
- 1955: La vida tiene tres días
- 1956: Cara de ángel
- 1956: El hombre que quiso ser pobre
- 1956: El médico de las locas
- 1957: Juventud desenfrenada
- 1957: Grítenme piedras del campo
- 1957: Vainilla, bronce y morir (Una mujer más)
- 1958: Mujer en condominio
- 1959: México nunca duerme
- 1959: Ángel del infierno
- 1962: Pecado de juventud
- 1966: La vida de Pedro Infante
- 1984: Cruz de olvido
- 1988: Los Psiquiatras Ardientes
