= Tres caras de mujer =

Mexican telenovela

- Genre: Telenovela
- Directed by: Ernesto Alonso
- Country of origin: Mexico
- Original language: Spanish
- No. of seasons: 1
- No. of episodes: 55

Production
- Executive producer: Ernesto Alonso

Original release
- Network: Telesistema Mexicano
- Release: 1963

Tres caras de mujer is a Mexican telenovela produced by Ernesto Alonso for Telesistema Mexicano in 1963.

== Cast ==
- Ernesto Alonso as Claudio
- Amparo Rivelles as Laura
- Ramón Bugarini
- José Gálvez as Gustavo
- Prudencia Griffel
- Miguel Manzano
- Guillermo Murray
- Graciela Orozco
- Carmen Salas
- Fanny Schiller as Tia Epifania
- Mercedes Pascual
- Malú Galán
- E. Diaz Indiano
- Manuel García
- Mario Vega
