= Escuela para suegras =

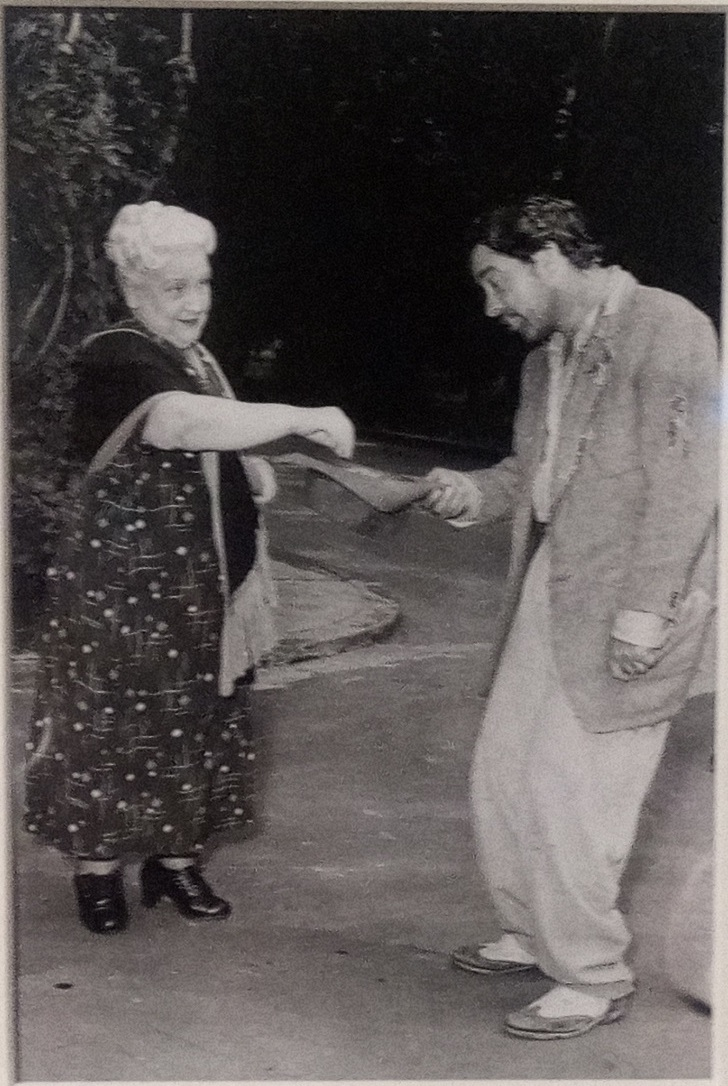
- Prudencia Grifell and Germán Valdés "Tin-Tan" (film still)
- Directed by: Gilberto Martínez Solares
- Written by: María Luisa Algarra (story); Gilberto Martínez Solares; Sixto Pondal Ríos (play)
- Produced by: Fernando de Fuentes
- Starring: Germán Valdés; Martha Mijares; Blanca de Castejón; Prudencia Grifell
- Cinematography: Jorge Stahl Jr.
- Edited by: Pedro Velázquez
- Music by: Luis Hernández Bretón
- Release date: 12 February 1958
- Running time: 85 minutes
- Country: Mexico
- Language: Spanish

Escuela para suegras ("School for Mothers-in-law") is a 1958 Mexican comedy film written and directed by Gilberto Martínez Solares and starring Germán Valdés "Tin-Tan", Martha Mijares, Blanca de Castejón, and Prudencia Grifell. It was adapted from a screenplay by the Argentine dramatist and poet Sixto Pondal Ríos. This film is also considered a parody of Escuela para vagabundos (1955), from Pedro Infante.

== Cast ==
- Germán Valdés "Tin-Tan"
- Martha Mijares
- Blanca de Castejón
- Óscar Pulido
- Prudencia Grifell (as Prudencia Griffel)
- Julio Monterde
- Marcelo Chávez (as Marcelo)
- Pompín Iglesias
- Eduardo Alcaraz (as Eduardo Arcaraz)
- Óscar Ortiz de Pinedo
- Joaquín García Vargas (as "Borolas")
- Jorgito Kreutzmann (as Jorge Kreutzman)
- Altia Michel
- Nacho Contla (as Ignacio Contla)
- Magda Monzón

== Release ==
The film was theatrically released in Mexico on 12 February 1958.

== Reception ==
The film was noted for its use of various musical genres and American car models.
