= The Lieutenant Nun =

- Directed by: Emilio Gómez Muriel
- Written by: Max Aub; Marco Aurelio Galindo; Eduardo Ugarte
- Produced by: Francisco A. de Icaza
- Starring: María Félix; Ángel Garasa; José Cibrián
- Cinematography: Raúl Martínez Solares
- Edited by: Jorge Busto
- Music by: Luis Hernández Bretón
- Production company: Clasa Films Mundiales
- Release date: 27 July 1944
- Running time: 88 minutes
- Country: Mexico
- Language: Spanish

The Lieutenant Nun (Spanish: La monja alférez) is a 1944 Mexican historical adventure film directed by Emilio Gómez Muriel and starring María Félix, Ángel Garasa and José Cibrián. It is based on the life of Antonio de Erauso (a.k.a. Catalina de Erauso).

The film's sets were designed by the art director Jorge Fernández.

== Cast ==
- María Félix as Catalina Erauso 'La Monja Alférez' / Don Alonso
- Ángel Garasa as Roger
- José Cibrián as Juan de Aguirre
- Delia Magaña as Elvira
- José Pidal as Don César, canónigo
- Fanny Schiller as Doña Úrsula
- Paco Fuentes as Don Miguel de Erauso
- Eugenia Galindo as Doña Cristina
- Esther Luquín as Beatriz
- Maruja Grifell as Reverenda madre
- José Goula as Don Claudio
- Lauro Benítez as Don Indalecio
- Jesús Valero as Sacerdote
- Manuel Sánchez Navarro as Don Diego Fernández de Córdova, Virrey del Peru
- Enrique García Álvarez as Don Ignacio de Aguirre
- Consuelo Guerrero de Luna as Lucinda

== Bibliography ==
- Klossner, Michael. The Europe of 1500-1815 on Film and Television: A Worldwide Filmography of Over 2550 Works, 1895 Through 2000. McFarland & Company, 2002.
