= Five Minutes of Love =

1941 film

- Directed by: Alfonso Patiño Gómez
- Written by: Manuel Arvide; José Carbo; Carlos Orellana; Alfonso Patiño Gómez
- Produced by: Emilio Arroyane; Fernando Méndez; Alfonso Patiño Gómez
- Starring: Arturo de Córdova; Mapy Cortés; Carlos Orellana
- Cinematography: Ross Fisher
- Edited by: Juan José Marino
- Music by: Miguel Lerdo de Tejada
- Release date: 11 December 1941
- Running time: 75 minutes
- Country: Mexico
- Language: Spanish

Five Minutes of Love (Spanish: Cinco minutos de amor) is a 1941 Mexican comedy film directed by Alfonso Patiño Gómez and starring Arturo de Córdova, Mapy Cortés and Carlos Orellana. The film's sets were designed by the art director Mariano Rodríguez Granada.

== Synopsis ==
Three different men believe that the same woman is their mistress, leading to a farcical situation.

== Cast ==
- Arturo de Córdova as Rafael de la Torre
- Mapy Cortés as Lulú
- Carlos Orellana as Don Ataulfo
- Ángel Garasa as Fredeslindo
- Alicia Ortiz as Delia
- Natalia Ortiz as Celeste
- Agustín Isunza as Federico
- Linda Gorráez as Elena
- Rodolfo Calvo as Comisario
- Carolina Barret as Sirvienta de Lulú

== Bibliography ==
- Gubern, Román. Cine español en el exilio, 1936-1939. Lumen, 1976.
- Riera, Emilio García. Historia documental del cine mexicano: 1941. Ediciones Era, 1969.
