= The Third Word =

- Directed by: Julián Soler
- Starring: Pedro Infante, Marga López, Sara García, Prudencia Griffel
- Release date: 1956
- Running time: 110 minutes
- Country: Mexico
- Language: Spanish

The Third Word (Spanish: "La tercera palabra") is a 1956 Mexican film based on the play of the same name written by Alejandro Casona and starring Pedro Infante, Marga López, Sara García and Prudencia Griffel.

== Plot ==
Two aunts hire Margarita (Marga López) to educate their wild nephew Pablo (Pedro Infante) who has lived his life on a rural mountain ranch and knows little of civilization. If he is not educated, then other close relatives threaten to delegitimize him of his inheritance of the ranch and hacienda.

After many difficulties, Margarita teaches Pablo to read and write as he in turn teaches her how to ride horses and hunt. From this, a romance buds between them. As his family gathers to ready Pablo to prove his sanity and ability to handle his inheritance, Margarita recognizes a previous lover in the lawyer present. When Pablo finds out, his distress at what he believes is a betrayal not unlike his mother allows his relatives to urge the psychologist to deem him unfit to inherit. Even when the psychologist sees through the family's manipulation, Margarita is unable to console Pablo and leaves. His aunts approach Pablo and help him to understand that of the forces he knew (God and death), there is a third one, love, or "the third word", and he races after Margarita to bring her back.
