= What Can Not Be Forgiven =

- Directed by: Roberto Rodríguez
- Written by: Carlos González Dueñas; Ricardo Parada de León; Roberto Rodríguez
- Produced by: Aurelio García Yévenes
- Starring: María Elena Marqués; Armando Calvo; Domingo Soler
- Cinematography: Jorge Stahl Jr.
- Edited by: Fernando Martínez
- Music by: Raúl Lavista
- Production company: Películas Rodríguez
- Release date: 9 October 1953
- Running time: 90 minutes
- Country: Mexico
- Language: Spanish

What Can Not Be Forgiven (Spanish: Lo que no se puede perdonar!..) is a 1953 Mexican drama film directed by Roberto Rodríguez and starring María Elena Marqués, Armando Calvo and Domingo Soler.

== Cast ==
- María Elena Marqués as Hortensia
- Armando Calvo as Jorge del Río
- Domingo Soler as Don Javier
- Emperatriz Carvajal as Rita
- Salvador Quiroz as Doctor
- Conchita Gentil Arcos as Nana Rafaela
- Héctor Godoy as Gerardo
- Cecilia Leger as Reverenda madre
- León Barroso as Pepe
- Manuel Casanueva as Cobrador de cuentas
- Lupe del Castillo as Abortista
- María Gentil Arcos as Hermana religiosa
- Miguel Ángel López as Hombre en lago
- Blanca Marroquín as Sirvienta
- Ignacio Peón as Hombre en aeropuerto
- Carlos Robles Gil as Hombre en baile
- Manuel Trejo Morales as Empleado banco
- Guillermo Álvarez Bianchi as Mesero

== Bibliography ==
- María Luisa Amador. Cartelera cinematográfica, 1950-1959. UNAM, 1985.
