= The Love Hotel =

1933 film

- Directed by: Carl Lamac
- Written by: Hans H. Zerlett
- Produced by: Robert Leistenschneider; Carl Lamac; Anny Ondra
- Starring: Anny Ondra; Mathias Wieman; Peter Voß
- Cinematography: Otto Heller; Josef Wirsching; Ernst Zahn
- Edited by: Ella Ensink
- Music by: Leo Leux
- Production company: Ondra-Lamac-Film
- Distributed by: Bayerische Film
- Release date: 19 December 1933
- Running time: 86 minutes
- Country: Germany
- Language: German

The Love Hotel (German: Das verliebte Hotel) is a 1933 German comedy film directed by Carl Lamac and starring Anny Ondra, Mathias Wieman and Peter Voß. It was shot at the Bavaria Studios in Munich. The film's sets were designed by the art directors Wilhelm Depenau and Erich Zander. A separate French-language version was also made.

== Cast ==
- Anny Ondra as Hanne Boll
- Mathias Wieman as Klaus Petermann
- Peter Voß as Joachim, Kunstmaler
- Max Gülstorff as Onkel Benjamin
- Erika Glässner as Ludmilla Dippel
- Paula Denk as Lilo, Tochter von Frau Dippel
- Josef Eichheim as Waldheim, Komponist
- Carl Walther Meyer as Erik, Kunstmaler
- Fritz Odemar as Spitzbein, Kammerdiener
- Karl Platen as Arzt
- Max Schreck as Hoteldirektor

== Bibliography ==
- Bock, Hans-Michael; Bergfelder, Tim, eds. (2009). The Concise Cinegraph: Encyclopaedia of German Cinema. New York: Berghahn Books. ISBN 978-1-57181-655-9.
