= Between Your Love and Heaven =

1950 film

- Directed by: Emilio Gómez Muriel
- Written by: Max Aub; Mauricio Magdaleno
- Based on: El Mistico by Santiago Rusiñol
- Produced by: Adolfo Grovas
- Starring: Rosario Granados; Roberto Cañedo; Rodolfo Acosta
- Cinematography: Raúl Martínez Solares
- Edited by: Gloria Schoemann
- Music by: Manuel Esperón
- Production company: Cinematográfica Grovas
- Release date: 30 November 1950
- Running time: 90 minutes
- Country: Mexico
- Language: Spanish

Between Your Love and Heaven (Spanish: Entre tu amor y el cielo) is a 1950 Mexican crime drama film directed by Emilio Gómez Muriel and starring Rosario Granados, Roberto Cañedo and Rodolfo Acosta. It was shot at the Clasa Studios in Mexico City. The film's sets were designed by the art director Gunther Gerszo. It was based on a play by Santiago Rusiñol which had previously been adapted into a 1926 Spanish silent film.

== Cast ==
- Rosario Granados as Martha Ortega
- Roberto Cañedo as Ramón
- Rodolfo Acosta as Miguel Ramírez
- Armando Soto La Marina as Pio
- Prudencia Grifell as Doña Francisca
- Andrés Soler as Don Andrés
- Carlos Martínez Baena as Padre Juan
- Juan Orraca as Sacerdote
- Pedro Ibarra as Matón I
- Lupe Inclán as Sebastiana
- Carmen Guillén as Matilde
- Enrique del Castillo as Doctor
- María Conesa as Señora Rojas
- Alejandro Ciangherotti as Lic. del Pozo
- José Chávez as Matón II
- Armando Velasco as Comisario
- Emma Rodríguez as Mercedes
- Kika Meyer as Cabaretera
- Lupe Carriles as Vecina chismosa
- Humberto Rodríguez as Portero

== Bibliography ==
- Riera, Emilio García. Historia documental del cine mexicano: 1949. Ediciones Era, 1969.
- Wilt, David E. The Mexican Filmography, 1916 through 2001. McFarland, 2024.
