= Suddenly, Love =

- Genre: Drama; Romance
- Written by: Katherine Coker
- Directed by: Stuart Margolin
- Starring: Cindy Williams; Paul Shenar; Eileen Heckart
- Music by: David Rose
- Country of origin: United States
- Original language: English

Production
- Producers: Ross Hunter; Jacques Mapes
- Cinematography: Robert B. Hauser
- Editors: Richard Bracken; Sidney Wolinsky
- Running time: 100 minutes
- Production company: Ross Hunter Productions Inc.

Original release
- Network: NBC
- Release: December 4, 1978

Suddenly, Love is a 1978 American TV movie, produced by Ross Hunter, about the romance between a woman who grew up in a poor neighborhood and a "socially prominent" attorney. The film premiered on NBC on December 4, 1978.

The Los Angeles Times said it had "considerable charm".

== Plot ==
During the 1950s Regina Malloy grows up in an abusive, low-class Brooklyn family. She receives encouragement from the neighborhood tailor, Mr. Luria, to pursue higher education. With the help of scholarships Regina studies to become an architect. Regina meets Jack Graham, a wealthy law school professor. They marry in the early 1960s and have a child Bobbi, but Jack's chronic health problems cause challenges in their lives.

== Cast ==
- Cindy Williams as Regina Malloy Graham
- Paul Shenar as Jack Graham
- Drew Barrymore as Bobbi Graham
- Eileen Heckart as Mrs. Malloy
- Scott Brady as Mr. Malloy
- Joan Bennett as Mrs. Graham
- Lew Ayres as Mr. Graham
- Kurt Kasznar as Mr. Luria
