= Carmen Beltrán =

Mexican-American writer

Carmen Celia Beltrán
- Born: Carmen Celia Beltrán; February 19, 1905; Durango, Mexico
- Died: May 26, 2002 (aged 97); Tucson, Arizona, United States
- Occupation: Writer
- Known for: Writing, directing and designing the play México Ayer Y Hoy

Carmen Celia Beltrán (February 19, 1905 – May 26, 2002) was a Mexican-American writer of poetry, plays, essays, and radio and religious dramas.

== Early life ==
Beltrán was born in Durango, Mexico, on February 19, one of seven children in her family. The Beltrán's were a family of musicians. Her mother, Guadalupe, played mandolin, all of her siblings played instruments, and her father a Major in the military band of Mexican President Porfirio Diaz. The dangers of the Mexican Revolution, combined with her father's political connections, forced the family to flee into the mountains of Durango. Beltrán would be hidden with Carmelite nuns until she was old enough to travel with the family to the United States. During the family's attempts to get to the United States, they were victims in the midst of a train heist, which left them stranded with no money or baggage in San Pedro de las Colonias.

The family arrived in San Antonio, Texas, after traveling for two years. Her father started a music studio and taught band classes, inspiring his daughter. Beltrán graduated from San Antonio High School in 1924 and began teaching Spanish and working for a Spanish language publishing firm. She wrote for Spanish-language journals in San Antonio and worked on radio. During this period she had a brief marriage and two daughters, Norma and Yolanda. At her death she had six grandchildren and many great grandchildren.

== Life in Tucson ==
When a year comes to an end, a page out of the album of our life is completed, and a new one is placed before us. What changes did take place in our spirit? If we could read very carefully the completed page forgetting its contents, what would we feel? Will it have been a wasted year? If we were happy, will a sigh escape us when the year ends?…
--"Meditaciones de año Nuevo" by Carmen Beltrán

Between 1938 and 1942 Beltrán moved to Tucson, Arizona due to respiratory problems. She became active in the Mexican American community and started writing articles for the Spanish language newspaper El Tucsonense and producing a weekly radio program called "Theatre of the Air." The radio show, in Spanish, focused on religious themes that were approved by the local clergy and by Catholic Bishop Daniel J. Gercke. She also wrote plays which were performed on the radio and at Holy Family Church. Beltrán would go on to write for Arizona-based magazines, the English language Tucson Daily Reporter and columns for La Voz. She also worked professionally as a secretary in a law firm, an interpreter independently and for the Industrial Commission of Arizona.

In 1952 Beltrán created the performance México Ayer Y Hoy, which reflected on the history of Aztec, colonial and independent Mexico. The drama opened on September 15 at Tucson High School and later in other venues. She wrote the script, directed the performances and designed the costumes which were made by local community members. For the play and her activities within the Mexican American community she was awarded the Humanitarian Award from the Mexican American Unity Council and the City of Tucson's Amistad Award for her work with local radio station KUAT. She was awarded a César Award and in 1992 the Arizona Historical Society founded the Carmen Celiá Beltrán Hispanic Theatre Archives. She died 26 May 2002 from breast cancer. (Note: The University of Arizona's Women's Plaza of Honor states she died in 2002.)

== Legacy ==
In 2006 Beltrán was honored with a place in the University of Arizona's Women's Plaza of Honor.
