= Severo Muguerza =

Severo Muguerza (1883–1952) was a composer of Spanish, Basque, and Neapolitan zarzuelas and operettas. He was born in San Sebastián, Guipúzcoa, País Vasco, Spain, and lived his later years in Cuba, Venezuela, and Mexico.

== Career ==
In 1911 Severo Muguerza and his orchestra accompanied the great Mexican soprano diva and actress, Esperanza Iris (1884–1962), known as the “Queen of Operetta” of zarzuelas and operettas, on one of the earliest phonographic recordings in the twentieth century, Aires De Primavera. Muguerza’s orchestra played La Cuarta Plana (1911), La Poupe (1911), Aires de Primavera (1911), Los Tres Deseos (1911), La Princesa del Dólar (1911), Vals de Amor (1911), Cura de Amor (1911), Maniobras de Otoño (1911), La Princesa de los Balkanes (1911), and La Hija del Príncipe (1911). Iris later built the Teatro Esperanza Iris in 1918, now called Teatro de la Ciudad Esperanza Iris, and is one of Mexico City’s oldest public venues for cultural events.

At Madrid's Teatro de la Latina in 1921, Severo Muguerza conducted the music for the one-act comic play La melindrosa (lyrics by Enrique F. Gutiérrez-Roig and Luis Gabaldón and music by Severo Muguerza) on April 15 and Noche de ronda, a zarzuela with lyrics by Jose M. Aracil and Eduardo Palacio-Valdes and music by Severo Muguerza, on July 29. ¡Al toro, que es una mona!, lyrics by Valeriano León with music by Severo Muguerza y Enrique Navarro Tadeo, was performed at the Teatro Novidades on September 22, 1922. A year later, El príncipe azul, a comic opera in one act (lyrics by Julio Torres and Rafael Robledo), was performed at the Teatro Ruzafa, in Valencia, Spain, on December 14, 1923.

On November 8, 1931, he directed an operetta at the Teatro Nacional, in which Caridad Suárez Valdés interpreted the role of 'Valencienne' in the La viuda alegre, alongside Esperanza Iris as ‘Ana de Glavary’, Manolo Villa as ‘Danilo’, and Panchito Naya as ‘Rosillón’. Muguerza directed Los diamantes de la corona at the Teatro Nacional January 30, 1932, with Panchito Naya, Estelita Echazábal, and Paco Salas.

Prior to the beginning of Spain's civil war (1936–39) and Francisco Franco's rise to power in 1939, Severo traveled to Latin America with Palmira Tomas Pardo, an opera singer from Barcelona, and her sister Carmen (1895-?), also a soprano and theatrical actress, to Caracas, Venezuela; Cuba; and later Mexico, settling in Cuernavaca.

Spain's civil war (July 18, 1936 to April 1, 1939) changed Mexico's cultural life overnight. The civil war killed several thousands and brought many intellectuals, musicians, and actors to Argentina, Colombia, Venezuela, and Mexico. Spanish musicians and actors joined Mexico's golden age of cinema, contributing themes based on civil war and injustice.

Severo Muguerza along with Antonio Díaz Conde, Gustavo Pittaluga, and Rodolfo Halffer wrote film scores for Venezuela's and Mexico's film industry between 1934 and 1945. Severo composed movie scores for Destino de Mujer (1934), directed by José Giaccardi and filmed in Venezuela. In Mexico he composed movie scores for Secreto eterno (1942), directed by Carlos Orellana; Adulterio (1943), directed by Spanish director José Díaz Morales; and Una Gitana en Mexico (1945) also directed by Spanish director José Díaz Morales.

== Personal life ==
Severo Muguerza had two children with actress María Berrio, who performed leading roles in both La melindrosa and Noche de ronda in 1921. Her daughter, actress Esperanza Muguerza Berrio (1916-?), married the legendary actor Carlos García Lemos. Esperanza's godmother was the Mexican diva Esperanza Iris. María Berrio's son, Virgilio Muguerza Berrio (1910-1976) was born in Arroyo Naranjo, La Habana, Cuba, and later settled in Buenos Aires.

On May 2, 1919, Severo departed from San Juan, Puerto Rico, for La Guaya, Venezuela, on the SS Julia. He listed his age as 34 and residence as Spain. On May 29, 1930, Severo again sailed from San Juan, Puerto Rico, bound for Santiago de Cuba on the SS Presidente Machado. At this time he listed his residence as Curacao. On April 17, 1933, he listed his residence as Havana, Cuba, and obtained an immigration permit to sail on the SS Presidente Machado from Santiago de Cuba to Puerto Rico and arrived on April 24, 1933.

In Mexico Muguerza married Palmira Tomás Pardo, and reported that his address was Caracas, Venezuela. On the marriage certificate, Palmira stated that she was from Barcelona, Cataluña, Spain, but her current address was Aldaco 8, Mexico City. Presiding over the wedding were Rosario Martin from Santander, Spain, and her husband Amador Perez from Asturias, Spain. At the time of her marriage Palmira had a son named Gustavo who was adopted by Severo Muguerza. Gustavo's father was a Czechoslovak named Sedergreg who had been killed while on a boat transporting refugees during World War II. Gustavo Muguerza Tomás (1918-1985) married Carmen Pérez Martín, the daughter of Rosario and Amador, who worked as a school administrator in Mexico City's public schools. He lived in Coyoacan, Mexico City, where he raised two sons, architect Gustavo Muguerza Perez (1947–2015) and Eduardo Muguerza Perez (1948–2022).

Severo Muguerza died of diabetes around 1952 at the Sanatorio Español in Mexico City.
