= Borrasca (TV series) =

- Genre: Telenovela
- Directed by: Ernesto Alonso
- Country of origin: Mexico
- Original language: Spanish
- No. of seasons: 1
- No. of episodes: 3

Production
- Production company: Telesistema Mexicano

Original release
- Network: Telesistema Mexicano
- Release: 1962

Borrasca (English: Storm) is a Mexican telenovela produced by Televisa and broadcast by Telesistema Mexicano in 1962.

== Cast ==
- Maricruz Olivier
- Prudencia Grifell
- Félix González
- Silvia Suárez
