= En defensa Propia =

1917 film

- Directed by: Joaquín Coss
- Written by: Mimí Derba
- Release date: 1917
- Country: Mexico
- Language: Silent

En defensa Propia ("In Self Defence") is a 1917 Mexican silent film directed by Joaquín Coss and starring Mimí Derba, María Caballé and Julio Taboada. This film marked the film debut of the comedian actress Sara García.
