= Alejandro Sosa =

Fictional character

- Paul Shenar as Alejandro Sosa in the 1983 film
- First appearance: Scarface (1983)
- Last appearance: Scarface: The World Is Yours (2006)
- Created by: Oliver Stone
- Based on: Roberto Suárez Gómez
- Portrayed by: Paul Shenar
- Voiced by: Fred Tatasciore (The World Is Yours)

In-universe information
- Full name: Alejandro Sosa
- Nickname: Alex
- Gender: Male
- Occupation: Drug lord
- Nationality: Bolivian
- Affiliation: Bolivian Cartel
- Birthplace: Bolivia

Alejandro "Alex" Sosa is a fictional character and the main antagonist in the American epic crime drama film Scarface (1983) and the action-adventure video game Scarface: The World Is Yours (2006). He is an international Bolivian drug lord and the chief supplier of cocaine for his business partner Tony Montana. Sosa is portrayed by Paul Shenar in the film and voiced by Fred Tatasciore in the 2006 video game, and speaks with an American accent. He is based on the Bolivian drug lord and trafficker Roberto Suárez Gómez.

== Overview ==
=== Scarface (1983) ===
Alejandro Sosa is presented in the film as a Bolivian landowner, hailing from a rich family, educated in England and currently the business brain and drug overlord of an empire that stretches across the Andes region. He is immensely wealthy and has extensive political and criminal connections, both in Latin America and the United States.

Frank Lopez (Robert Loggia) sends Tony Montana (Al Pacino) and Omar Suárez (F. Murray Abraham) to Cochabamba, Bolivia to make a drug deal with Sosa who asks them to guarantee the buying of a certain amount of cocaine every month. During lunch, one of Sosa's henchmen recognizes Suárez from New York City years ago as a police informant responsible for imprisoning Vito Duval and the Ramos Brothers (Nello and Gino) for life, and notifies Sosa. While Tony stays with Sosa, Suárez is sent back to Miami, Florida, only to be beaten and hanged to death from a helicopter by Sosa's henchmen, which Tony witnesses. Sosa gives immediate respect to Tony due to his honesty and straightforward demeanor, even agreeing that Omar fooling Lopez "could happen to anyone". Tony promises Sosa he will talk with Frank about sharing the risk, but Sosa warns Tony not to betray him. When a very displeased Frank hears of the developments, he refuses to believe Omar was a "stoolie," and even suspects Tony has some ulterior motives. Lopez and Tony separate after the argument and the latter continues to flirt with and even proposes marriage to Lopez's girlfriend Elvira Hancock (Michelle Pfeiffer). When Lopez becomes aware of Tony's aspirations regarding Elvira, he sends two hitmen to have him killed. The plan backfires and Tony kills the two hitmen. Tony and his right-hand man Manny Ribera (Steven Bauer) go to Frank's car dealership and has Manny kill Frank when he confesses he setup the hit. Tony then kills Mel Bernstein (Harris Yulin), a corrupt police detective under Frank's employ. Tony becomes a drug lord in Miami and for a while, enjoys a period of mutual business prosperity with Sosa.

When Tony is arrested for tax evasion, Sosa offers to use his government contacts to keep Montana from going to prison, despite Tony paying back taxes and large fines. In exchange, Montana is to assassinate a journalist who is threatening to expose Sosa's illicit activities. Montana agrees and heads to New York City with Sosa's henchman Alberto "The Shadow" (Mark Margolis), planning to detonate a bomb in the journalist's car. However, the journalist is unexpectedly accompanied by his wife and children, causing Montana to call off the hit. Shadow refuses and intends to detonate the bomb, causing Montana to shoot "The Shadow" in the head. Later, when Montana reaches his home, Sosa calls and chews Tony out for failing to assassinate the journalist, the car bomb being found, the journalist now having extra security, along with Sosa and his partners facing heavy repercussions. Sosa sends his assassins to Montana's home to finish him. Despite the casualties he inflicts, Montana is ultimately killed in the attack when Sosa's personal hitman "The Skull" (Geno Silva) sneaks up behind him, and shoots Montana in the back with a double-barreled shotgun, causing him to fall into the fountain with the symbolic "The World Is Yours" globe sign above it. This is notably similar to the final scene of the original Scarface film from 1932.

=== Scarface: The World Is Yours (2006) ===
In the 2006 action-adventure video game Scarface: The World is Yours, the ending of the film treatment was altered to establish that Tony won the climactic battle against Sosa's men, escaping before the police showed up, although Sosa had succeeded in ending Tony's drug empire. Tony quits using cocaine and the game focuses on Tony's efforts to rebuild his old drug empire on the ashes of his old one and to exact revenge upon Sosa.

Sosa is not seen (though his voice is heard through much of the game) until the final mission where he held a meeting with Gaspar Gomez (Cheech Marin) and George Sheffield (James Woods) regarding the fact that Tony has taken over all of Miami and is now after them. Montana confronts Sosa in his living room after killing Gomez and Sheffield, and wiping out Sosa's men in his mansion in Bolivia. Sosa tells Montana he warned him not to betray him, but Montana did, referring to the incident with the journalist in the film. Sosa says that in their business, sometimes children have to be killed, particularly so "heroes don't go on 60 Minutes", referring to the journalist who on national TV named him and many of his allies as reputed drug traffickers. Montana then executes Sosa by shooting him 30 times with an AK-47 (with an under-barrelled Remington Model 870), unloading the entire magazine, and leaving his bullet-riddled corpse slumped against his couch. Tony Montana heads back to Miami, Florida where he proceeds to celebrate his control of the city's drug trade, Sosa's assassination, and the destruction of Sosa's drug empire.

== Reception, influence and legacy ==
The character of Alejandro Sosa was well-received. Complex has ranked Sosa as 27th in its list of 50 best villains in movie history. Rapper Pitbull said in 2014 that "I wanted to be Sosa – educated, good-looking, a good dresser". The song "Criminology" by Wu-Tang Clan rapper Raekwon, from his debut studio album Only Built 4 Cuban Linx... (1995), begins with a dialogue between Montana and Sosa where Sosa calls the former a "fucking little monkey". Rapper Chief Keef popularly goes by the nickname "Sosa" and he named his fifth child "Sno" meaning "The White Sosa". Montana's killing, ordered by Sosa, has been listed by Complex as the 1st one in its "Top 50 Movie Assassinations" list. The character Colonel Sanders in the South Park episode "Medicinal Fried Chicken" is similar to Sosa. In fact, the character is a direct parody of Sosa. Sanders would paraphrase Sosa to drive the parody home by saying, "Don't fuck me, Eric. Don't you ever try to fuck me." This is Sosa's famous catchphrase, with Tony's name being switched with Eric Cartman's name, Cartman being the "Tony Montana" analogue of the episode.
