= Héctor Herrera (photographer) =

Mexican photographer (born 1934)

Héctor Herrera (born Mexico City, 1934) is a Mexican photographer, who opened the first important studio in Mexico, in Jardines del Pedregal. He took official portrait photographs of presidents Miguel de la Madrid and Carlos Salinas de Gortari. Herrera is the grandson, son, and father of professional photographers.
