= Alma de sacrificio =

- Directed by: Joaquin Cross
- Written by: José Manuel Ramos
- Produced by: Mimí Derba and Enrique Rosas
- Starring: Mimi Derba, Julio Taboada, Salvador Quiroz and Emilia Ruiz del Castillo
- Cinematography: Enrique Rosas
- Music by: Miguel Lerdo de Tejada
- Distributed by: Azteca Estudios
- Release date: 1917
- Running time: 1 hour, 10 minutes
- Country: Mexico
- Language: Silent

Alma de sacrificio (English: Soul Sacrifice) is a 1917 Mexican silent film by Azteca Estudios. Directed by Joaquin Cross, the 70-minute film features Sara García in a very early appearance as an extra.
