= La casa de la Troya =

- Directed by: Carlos Orellana
- Written by: Manuel Altolaguirre (adaptation & additional dialogue), Egon Eis (adaptation & additional dialogue), Carlos Orellana (adaptation & additional dialogue), Alejandro Pérez Lugín (novel)
- Produced by: Gonzalo Elvira, Rodolfo Lowenthal (uncredited)
- Starring: Armando Calvo; Rosario Granados; Ángel Garasa
- Cinematography: José Ortiz Ramos
- Music by: Antonio Díaz Conde
- Release date: 1948
- Country: Mexico
- Language: Spanish

La casa de la Troya ("The House of Troy") is a 1948 Mexican film based on Alejandro Pérez Lugín's novel of the same name. It stars Armando Calvo, Rosario Granados, Ángel Garasa and Luis Alcoriza.
