= La soñadora =

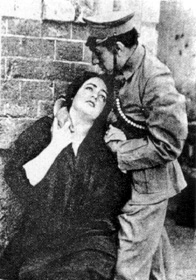
- Scene from film
- Starring: Mimí Derba, Eduardo Arozamena and Nelly Fernández
- Release date: 1917
- Country: Mexico
- Language: Silent

La soñadora ("The Dreamer") is a 1917 Mexican silent film. It starred Mimí Derba, Eduardo Arozamena and Nelly Fernández, and featured Sara García in a very early role as an extra.
