= Paul Shenar =

American actor (1936–1989)

- Shenar as Alejandro Sosa in Scarface (1983)
- Born: Albert Paul Shenar; February 12, 1936; Milwaukee, Wisconsin, U.S.
- Died: October 11, 1989 (aged 53); West Hollywood, California, U.S.
- Occupation: Actor
- Years active: 1971–1989
- Partner: Jeremy Brett (late 1970s)

Albert Paul Shenar (February 12, 1936 − October 11, 1989) was an American actor. A veteran Broadway and Shakespearean actor, he was one of the 27 founding members of the American Conservatory Theater. To film audiences, he was best known for his portrayals of Jenner in Don Bluth's The Secret of NIMH (1982) and drug lord Alejandro Sosa in Scarface (1983).

== Early life ==
Albert Paul Shenar was born February 12, 1936, in Milwaukee, Wisconsin, the second of four boys (one older brother John, two younger brothers Michael and Marc), born from Mary Rosella (née Puhek) and Eugene Joseph Shenar. He was of Polish and Slovene descent.

== Career ==
Shenar became involved in theater at an early age, working in Milwaukee playhouse productions. After graduating from high school, he enlisted in the United States Air Force. Following his military career he began acting again. He made his Broadway debut in a 1963 production of Six Characters in Search of an Author.

Shenar gained attention playing larger-than-life entertainment legends in late 1970s television films—Orson Welles in The Night That Panicked America and Florenz Ziegfeld, Jr., in Ziegfeld: The Man and His Women. He portrayed the character John Carrington in Part II of the miniseries Roots. In 1978, he starred in an avant-garde film adaptation of Frank Wedekind's Lulu, directed by Ronald Chase.

A founding member, actor, director and teacher of the American Conservatory Theater (ACT) in San Francisco, he played more than 40 roles there, including Hamlet, Oedipus Rex and Brother Julian in Tiny Alice.

In 1982, he provided the voice of Jenner, the main antagonist of Don Bluth's The Secret of NIMH; his performance in the film impressed Bluth so much that he wanted Shenar to also portray Space Ace's main antagonist, Commander Borf, but was unable to do so due to budget issues and the role ultimately went to Bluth himself.

In 1983, Shenar portrayed Alejandro Sosa, the main antagonist of Brian De Palma's Scarface. Despite the initially-mixed critical reception of the film, Shenar's performance of the Bolivian drug lord was widely well-received. Complex ranked Sosa as 27th in its list of 50 best villains in movie history.

Shenar continued to act during the late 1980s, including as supporting villain Paulo Rocca in the Arnold Schwarzenegger action film Raw Deal (1986). He had a recurring guest spot as twin brothers Jason and Justin Dehner on the primetime soap opera Dynasty. He did a stage version of Macbeth in Los Angeles and appeared in films like Best Seller, Man on Fire, and The Bedroom Window (all 1987). His last film role was in Luc Besson's The Big Blue (1988).

== Personal life ==
Shenar was gay, and was romantically involved with the English actor Jeremy Brett during the 1970s; they were in a relationship that reportedly lasted from 1973 to 1978. After the couple separated, they remained close friends until Shenar's death in 1989.

=== Illness and death ===
In 1983, Shenar was diagnosed with HIV/AIDS. He died from AIDS in West Hollywood on October 11, 1989, at age 53. His remains were cremated and given to his executor, Thomas Wiley.

== Filmography ==
=== Film ===
Year	Title	Role	Notes
1978	Lulu	Ludwig Schon	
1982	The End of August	Arobin	
1982	The Secret of NIMH	Jenner (voice)	
1983	Deadly Force	Joshua Adams	
1983	Scarface	Alejandro Sosa	
1986	Dream Lover	Ben Gardner	
1986	Raw Deal	Paulo Rocca	
1987	The Bedroom Window	Collin Wentworth	
1987	Man on Fire	Ettore	
1987	Best Seller	David Madlock	
1988	The Big Blue	Doctor Laurence	

=== Television ===
Year	Title	Role	Notes
1973	The ABC Afternoon Playbreak	Lieutenant Joe Moroni	Episode: "Alone with Terror"
1974	Columbo	Sergeant Young	Episode: "Publish or Perish"
1974	Owen Marshall, Counselor at Law	Blair	Episode: "House of Friends"
1974	Mannix	Johnny Sands	Episode: "The Dark Hours"
1974	Great Performances	De Guiche	Episode: "Cyrano de Bergerac"
1974	The Execution of Private Slovik	Crawford	TV movie
1975	Kojak	Arthur Harris	Episode: "Night of the Piraeus"
1975	Petrocelli	Archie LaSalle	Episode: "Death in Small Doses"
1975	The Invisible Man	Alexi Zartov	Episode: "Barnard Wants Out"
1975	Ellery Queen	Announcer Wendell Warren	Episode: "The Adventure of Miss Aggie's Farewell Performance"
1975	The Night That Panicked America	Orson Welles	TV movie
1976, 1977	Hawaii Five-O	Chadwick; Todd Daniels	Episodes: "A Killer Grows Wings" "See How She Runs"
1976	The Keegans	Rudi Portinari	TV movie
1976	Gemini Man	Charles Edward Royce	Episode: "Pilot"
1976	The Bionic Woman	Doctor Alan Cory	Episode: "The Ghosthunter"
1976	Wonder Woman	Lieutenant Wertz	Episodes: "The Feminum Mystique: Part 1" "The Feminum Mystique: Part 2"
1977	Roots	John Carrington	Episode: "Part II"
1977	The Hostage Heart	James Cardone	TV movie
1977	Young Dan'l Boone	Hammond	Episode: "The Pirate"
1977	Logan's Run	David Eakins	Episode: "Man Out of Time"
1977	The Mask of Alexander Cross	Alexander Cross	TV movie
1978	Ziegfeld: The Man and His Women	Florenz Ziegfeld	TV movie
1978	The Courage and the Passion	Nick Silcox	TV movie
1978	Suddenly, Love	Jack Graham	TV movie
1979	Family	Bob Gantry	Episode: "Moment of Truth"
1980	Hart to Hart	Michael Shillingford	Episode: "Night Horrors"
1980	Beulah Land	Roscoe Corlay	TV mini-series
1983, 1985	Dynasty	Jason Dehner; Justin Dehner	Episodes: "The Search", "Samantha", "The Californians"
1983	Scarecrow and Mrs. King	James Delano	Episode: "Service Above and Beyond"
1984	Paper Dolls	Jonathan Westfield	Episode: #1.1
1985	Brass	Schuyler Ross	TV movie
1985	Spenser: For Hire	Matthew Lowington	Episode: "Discord in a Minor"
1985	Streets of Justice	J. Elliott Sloan	TV movie
1985	Best of the Football Follies	Narrator	TV movie
1986	Dark Mansions	Phillip Drake	TV movie
1986	Rage of Angels: The Story Continues	Jerry Worth	TV movie
1987	Time Out for Dad	Chase	TV movie
