= Rosario Granados =

Argentine-born Mexican film actress

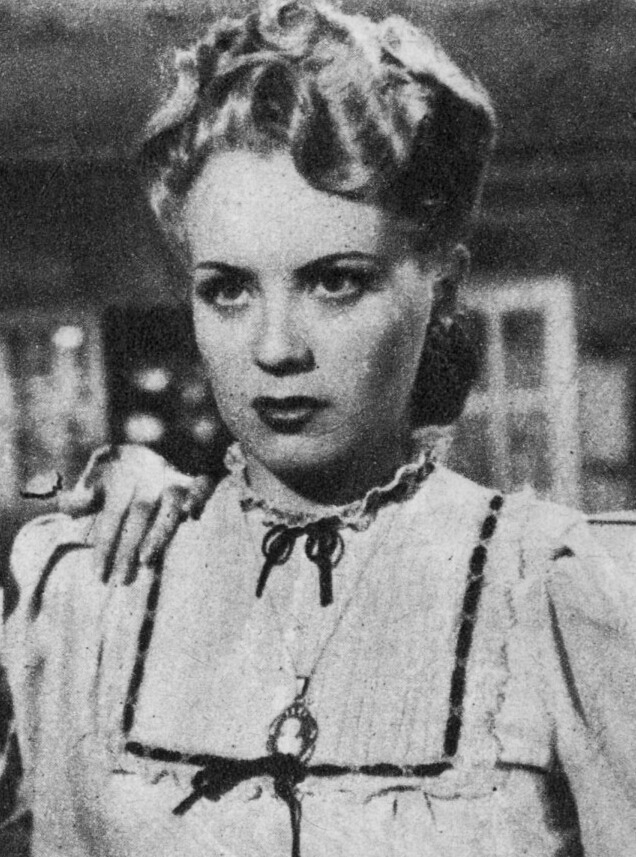
- Granados in 1948
- Born: Rosario Fiaschi Granados; 12 March 1925; Buenos Aires, Argentina
- Died: 25 March 1997 (aged 72); Mexico City, Mexico
- Other names: Rosario Granados; Charito Granados
- Occupation: Actress
- Years active: 1942–1990 (film)

Rosario Granados (12 March 1925 – 25 March 1997) was an Argentine-born Mexican film actress known for her roles in Mexican cinema. Granados starred in the 1949 comedy The Great Madcap (1949).

== Selected filmography ==
- The House of the Millions (1942)
- Adultery (1945)
- The Road to Sacramento (1946)
- Ecija's Seven Children (1947)
- The Secret of Juan Palomo (1947)
- The Kneeling Goddess (1947)
- La casa de la Troya (1948)
- The Great Madcap (1949)
- Between Your Love and Heaven (1950)
- Wife or Lover (1950)
- Immaculate (1950)
- The Cry of the Flesh (1951)
- The Trace of Some Lips (1952)
- A Woman Without Love (1952)
- The Sixth Race (1953)
- La Vida No Vale Nada (1955)
- The Medallion Crime (1956)

== Bibliography ==
- Acevedo-Muñoz, Ernesto R. Buñuel and Mexico: The Crisis of National Cinema. University of California Press, 2003.
