= Mimí Derba =

Mexican actress (1893–1953)

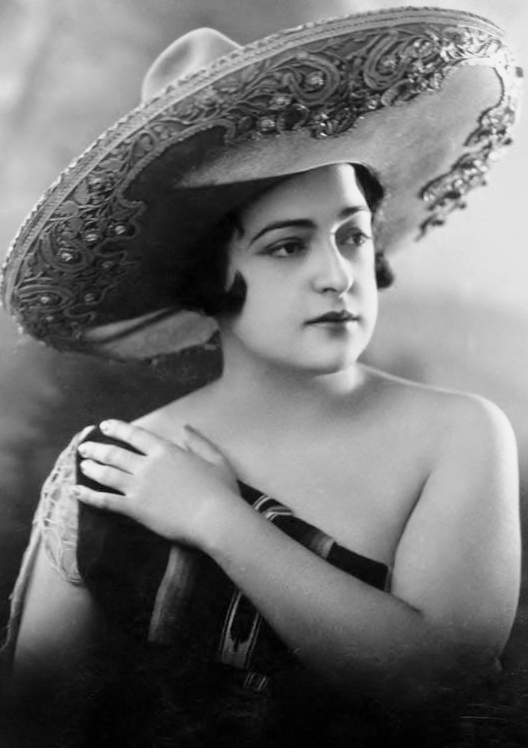
- Mimí Derba in 1925
- Born: María Herminia Pérez de León; 9 October 1893; Mexico City, Mexico
- Died: 14 July 1953 (aged 59); Mexico City, Mexico
- Occupations: Actress, film producer, film director, screenwriter
- Parent(s): Francisco Pérez de León and Jacoba Avendaño

María Herminia Pérez de León, better known as Mimí Derba (9 October 1893 – 14 July 1953) was a Mexican actress, screenwriter, and the first female film director in Mexico.

== Early life ==
At the age of seventeen in Derba sang for the Mexican theater; she transitioned from singing to acting in silent cinema.

== Career ==
=== Activism ===
Derba founded the first actors' union to negotiate wages, improve working conditions, and added benefits like health and pension plans. Due to starting this union, Derba lost film jobs.

=== Azteca Films ===
During the silent film era, Derba founded Azteca films with Enrique Rosas and produced five films in 1917. En defensa Propia was the first film made by Azteca films. Azteca films, however, faced the crisis of the Spanish pandemic in 1918, and as a result, her sixth film, Chapultepec was never finished. After an unsuccessful attempt to market Azteca's films abroad, she closed the company and retired from production. She continued to act and appeared in the film, Santa, one of Mexico's first sound film in 1931.” Films by Azteca Films include En Defensa Propia (1917), En la sombra (1917), Alma de sacrificio (1917), La soñadora (1917),La Tigresa (1917), and Chapultepec (1917).

While Mimí Derba owned Azteca films, she directed and produced La tigresa, about Eva, a budding actress willing to do anything to be the main character in a cruel and painful romance. She plots to convince a young woman to fall in love with the humble craftsman Bruno, but he ends up falling in love with Eva instead. Bruno later goes insane and admits himself into a madhouse where he is tormented with images of a tigress with Eva's face, attacking her in her delusions.

En Defensa Propia is Mimí Derba's second film and first screenplay for Azteca films. The story is about orphan Enriqueta, who must work hard for a living. She finds a job with the widower Julio Mancera, her young daughter. Julio and Enriqueta fall in love and get married. However, soon after their wedding, Julio's cousin returns from Europe and conspires to drive a wedge between the couple so they will break up. The cousin's plan almost works until they all end up at the same party one night, where she finds Julio, Enriqueta, and the other guests in a compromising situation.

== Selected filmography ==
- La Tigresa (1917)
- En Defensa Propia (1917)
- En la sombra (1917)
- Alma de sacrificio (1917)
- El automóvil gris (1919)
- Santa (1932)
- Martín Garatuza (1935)
- Women of Today (1936)
- Café Concordia (1939)
- La razón de la culpa (1942)
- Wild Flower (1943)
- María Eugenia (1943)
- Porfirio Díaz (1944)
- My Memories of Mexico (1944)
- The Hour of Truth (1945)
- Salón México (1949)
- Doctor on Call (1950)
- Treacherous (1950)
- Rosauro Castro (1950)
- Immaculate (1950)
- Oh Darling! Look What You've Done! (1951)
- My Wife Is Not Mine (1951)
- The Lie (1952)
- The Plebeian (1953)
