= Mexican film noir =

Mexican film noir consists of the Mexican contributions to film noir, a style of crime drama films originating in the United States during the mid-twentieth century. Also known as el cine negro in Spanish, these movies share similarities with their counterparts in the United States, including cynical attitudes toward society, nocturnal urban settings, and tales of corruption and violence. However, el cine negro has a distinctly regional take on the sub-genre, commonly discussing then-current Mexican cultural anxieties around economic development and sexuality.

== Origins ==
While Mexican noir officially began in the 1940’s, during the época de oro of Mexican cinema, there are earlier Mexican films with traits of the style. For example, El automóvil gris (1919), one of the first films ever made in Mexico, follows a gang robbery and subsequent criminal investigation, which contains elements of noir. Furthermore, there were numerous proto-noir Mexican movies, such as The Woman of the Port (1934).

The recognized start of Mexican film noir is with the ascent of Miguel Alemán Valdés to the presidency in 1946. Miguel Alemán was the first civilian Mexican president after a string of revolutionaries, and his reign, known as the alemanista era, was “a time of enormous industrialization and sudden wealth creation.” In an attempt to “modernize” Mexico, his policies “favored industry, big business, and foreign investment, producing economic growth but also deepening inequality and environmental destruction.” Along with severe corruption within his government, his administration left the Mexican people disillusioned and de-stabilized. These anxieties helped cultivate Mexican noir, which explored the corrupt, seedy underbelly of Mexican life.

The on-going American noir movement inspired Mexican noir filmmakers, as many Mexican leads in these films took inspiration from the “tough guy” personas of Hollywood. However, much of the influences on Mexican noir were local, not international. El cine negro was intertwined with regional genres like rumberas, which often explored similar themes of seedy nightlife and transgressive sexuality. Also, Alejandro Galindo’s pioneering urban dramas of the late 1930’s that looked at crime and the struggles of the working class led to directors like Roberto Gavaldón and Julio Bracho developing Mexican noir.

== Characteristics ==
Mexican noir shares many similarities with its counterpart in the United States. However, there are numerous distinctions, with Mexican noir tending to be more economically driven, romantic, and explicit.

- Economic focus: Instead of the jaded veterans and lonely men seen in American noir as a result of World War 2, Mexican noir tends to follow “strivers”, typically con men, politicians, or athletes. This is a result of Mexico’s rapid industrialization and wealth accumulation during the era. The quick economic ascent and consequent rampant corruption within the government left the Mexican people reeling. As said by Dave Kehr, “American noir is largely a product of war trauma; Mexican noir of economic trauma.”
- Anti-heroes: Mexican noir commonly centered unredeemable male protagonists who embodied hyper-masculinity. Unlike American noirs, which tended to shy away from completely morally-bankrupt leads, Mexican noirs such as Night Falls (1952) were more daring with the evilness of their main characters.
- Romance: In Mexican noir, romantic subplots are more heavily emphasized, with morally-centered female love interests who work to save the male lead from his errors and fight against corrupt anti-heroes. Love overall plays a large role in the regional genre, as many Mexican noirs focus on the consequences of obsessive love and lust.
- Sexuality: Mexican noir offers a franker and more explicit portrayal of sexuality than in the United States. The femme fatales are racier and dressed more scantily, and the omnipresent film setting is the nightclub, where cabaret dancers, prostitutes, adulterers, and pimps reside.

Many aspects of noir stayed the same across the border, including dark urban settings, moody cinematography, convoluted plots, and depictions of corruption and violence. For characteristics of film noir overall, see film noir.

== Notable films ==
Among the most important Mexican film noirs are:

- While Mexico Sleeps (1938): This is the first Mexican film to seriously show “moral corruption, urban sordidness, and social disenchantment”. It tells the story of an apothecary who is murdered at a drugstore and stars Arturo de Córdova.
- Another Dawn (1943): This film, directed and co-written by Julio Bracho, shows a battle between labor activists and corrupt politicians over possession of incriminating documents, along with a tragic love triangle and elements of rumbera.
- Twilight (1945): This film follows a respected surgeon who writes a clinical treatise book on mental illness that simultaneously recounts his descent into obsessive love. Arturo de Córdova and Gloria Marín star.
- The Other One (1946): This film tells the story of a woman who murders her twin and assumes her identity, which was remade in 1964 as Dead Ringer, with Bette Davis taking the dual role originally played by Dolores del Río.
- The Kneeling Goddess (1947): This film follows an affair between a cabaret singer (played by María Félix) and a businessman.
- May God Forgive Me (1948): In this movie, María Félix is a spy who suffers from war psychosis and reigns terror on men she meets.
- Victims of Sin (1950): This film tells the story of a cabaret dancer who finds an infant in a trashcan and raises it. Directed by Emilio Fernández and starring Ninón Sevilla.
- Rosauro Castro (1950): With Pedro Armendáriz in the title role, this film follows a crime boss in rural Mexico whose murder of a mayoral candidate is investigated by the government.
- In the Palm of Your Hand (1951): Inspired by Hollywood noirs with bloodthirsty couples like The Postman Always Rings Twice and Double Indemnity, a fortuneteller blackmails a widow in this Roberto Gavaldón movie.
- Night Falls (1952): This film, directed by Roberto Gavaldón and starring Pedro Armendáriz, follows the fall of a brutish, womanizing jai alai champion.

== Demise ==
Mexican film noir ended with the closing of the Miguel Alemán Valdés administration. In 1952, the mayor of Mexico City, Ernesto P. Uruchurtu, began to crack down on the cabaret scene and police movies coming out of the city. With this censorship and restrictive social climate, the noir movement died off.
