= Gonzalo de la Torre =

Gonzalo
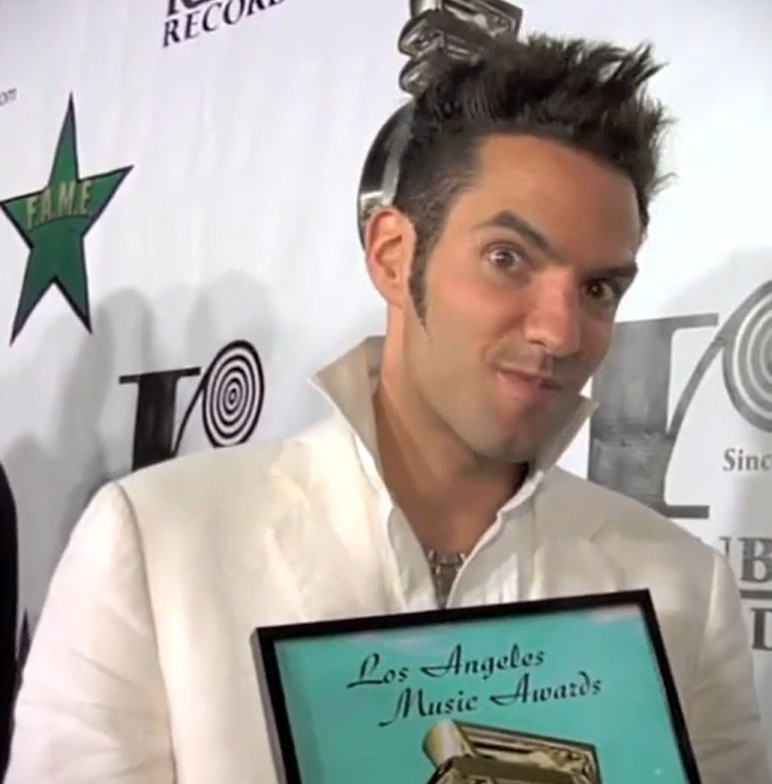
- de la Torre in 2011

Background information
- Born: Gonzalo de la Torre; February 1, 1977 (age 49)
- Origin: Mexico
- Genres: Rock, pop
- Occupations: Singer, songwriter, producer, director
- Instruments: Singer, guitar, bass, keyboard
- Years active: 1998–present
- Label: Tournesol media entertainment
- Website: www.210adios.com

Gonzalo de la Torre (born February 1, 1977, in Mexico City, Mexico), better known as "Gonzalo", is a Mexican-American singer, songwriter, director and producer. Gonzalo received singer-songwriter of the year at the 2010 Los Angeles Music Awards and Billboard World Song Contest Honorable Mention.

== Early life ==
From the age of 6, Gonzalo began singing and recorded in Lone Star Studios in Texas 2 years after. His love for singing and acting would continue to grow in drama throughout school, partaking in plays and extracurricular activities such as garage bands during middle school. Gonzalo began playing guitar at age 15 and taught the person who had sold him his first guitar a song he had learned after only one week. He continued singing in punk/rock bands as a teen, but felt limited in his artistic expression due to social phobia and onstage panic.

== Music career ==
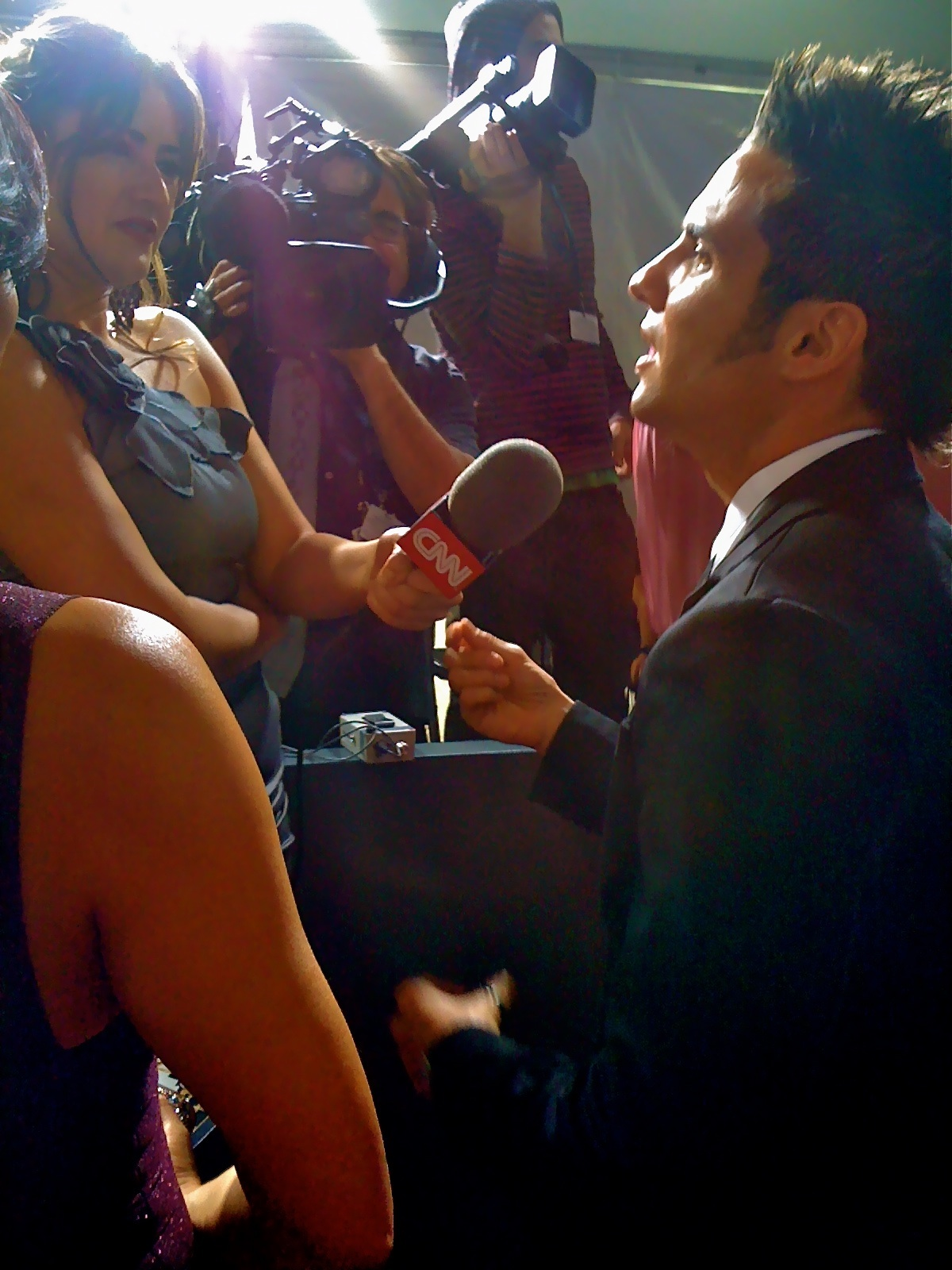
Gonzalo de la Torre at the 2010 Grammy Awards Red Carpet interviewed by CNN

In 2007, Gonzalo composed "If every Day were a Friday", after a 4-year writer's block and began his career of songwriting and composing, accumulating material that would later become his first album. After two years of writing, Gonzalo decided to move to South America to record his debut album, a half Spanish/half English compilation reflecting his culture and upbringing. He released his album titled 'Borderless' under the label Tournesol media entertainment and decides to move back to his hometown Mexico City with the objective of hearing himself on the radio, and after 12 months of arduous radio and TV promotion his single 'Sueño Sin Fin' reaches national radio exposure. In November 2010, his album receives 2 nominations for the 2010 Los Angeles Music Awards, consolidating his career as an international artist as well as recognition as a songwriter in English as well as Spanish, a statement of biculturalism. He is awarded Singer-Songwriter of the year at the 2010 Los Angeles Music Awards, and shortly after honorable mention by Billboard on its World Song Contest. Singles of his such as 'A Donde Vas?' are presented to Lphant Film Producer Pablo Segovia and Pedro Velasco to create a documentary short based on his music with the theme of migration to the US. The documentary becomes an official selection of the San Diego Latin Film Festival of 2011, and Gonzalo decides to move to Los Angeles to promote his material to the International market.

One of the songs in his debut album is a Spanish translation of "Hold Me Now" by the Thompson Twins, which was granted authorization by Tom Bailey himself. As of 2011, he is working in collaboration with both renowned artists from Mexico and the United States.

=== Remix ===
DJ Hoochy Papa from England remixes his controversial single based on migration 'A Donde Vas?' with an energetic dance spin.

== Discography ==
2010: Borderless

== Filmography ==
Gonzalo de la Torre directed and produced A Donde Vas? with the Association of Tournesol Media Entertainment and Lphant Films, a documentary officially selected to the San Diego Latin Film Festival of 2011.

== Post Music career ==
Gonzalo left the music industry in 2012 to support startups in media consulting.

== Telenovelas ==
- Josefina as Matias (2010)

== Primetime series and shows ==
- HSN (Mexico) as Co-host (2001)
