= Emma Padilla =

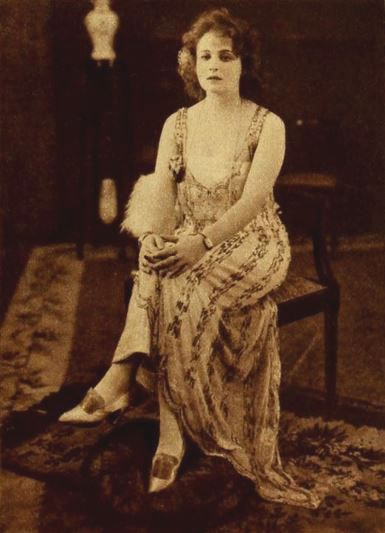
- Padilla in January 1922 issue of Photoplay
- Born: March 8, 1900; Mexico City, Mexico
- Died: July 2, 1966 (aged 66); Mexico City, Mexico

Emma Padilla (March 8, 1900 – July 2, 1966) was Mexico's first film star.

She was noted for her resemblance to, and copying the mannerisms of, Italian film star Pina Menichelli, particularly in La luz (1917), which was essentially a copy of the successful Italian film Il Fuoco (1915) starring Menichelli.

== Selected filmography ==
- La luz (1917)
- Hasta después de la muerte (1920)
