= Tournesol Media Entertainment =

- Type: film production and music production
- Country: Mexico, United States
- Availability: International
- Founded: 1998 by (as Tournesol Media Entertainment) Marco de la Torre
- Motto: Media Beyond Borders
- Owner: Independent (1998–present)
- Key people: Marco de la Torre (Founder)
- Launch date: September 16, 2003 (print); July 14, 2010 (film)
- Former names: Tournesol (1998); Tournesol Records (2009–present); Tournesol Media Entertainment (1998–present)
- Official website: www.tournesolmedia.com

Tournesol Media Entertainment (TMTV) is an American record label and film production company, setting the stage for cross-border music and films. Their debut documentary 'A Donde Vas?' was an official selection at the San Diego Latin Film Festival of 2011. The name Tournesol is derived from Sunflower in French, communicating the values and direction of the organization seeking culturally awakening topics, themes and production. The media organization has been known to cross-promote artists and branding in the United States, Latin America and Europe.
