= Tepeyac (film) =

- Directed by: José Manuel Ramos; Carlos E. Gonzáles; Fernando Sáyago
- Written by: José Manuel Ramos; Carlos E. Gonzáles
- Produced by: Enrique Rosas
- Starring: Beatriz de Córdova: Virgen de Guadalupe; Gabriel Montiel: Juan Diego Cuauhtlatoatzin; Pilar Cotta: Lupita Flores; Fray Juan de Zumárraga; Fray Bernardino de Sahagún
- Production company: Colonial
- Release date: 1917
- Running time: 64 min
- Country: Mexico

Tepeyac (Spanish: El milagro de Tepeyac, lit. 'The Miracle from Tepeyac') is a 1917 Mexican silent film directed by José Manuel Ramos, Carlos E. Gonzáles and Fernando Sáyago. It was rescued by Aurelio de los Reyes and restored by the National Autonomous University of Mexico and is Mexico's only surviving silent film in history.

== Plot ==
The full film Tepeyac from 1917

Lupita Flores knows her fiancé Carlos Fernández was in a boat sunk by a German submarine and she prays to the Virgin of Guadalupe.

Later on, she cannot sleep and starts reading a book about the apparition of Tonantzin as the Virgin of Guadalupe. The story follows Juan Diego, who sees a vision of the maiden at Tepeyac. Eventually, Carlos is saved and Lupita and Carlos go to Basilica of Our Lady of Guadalupe on December 12.

== Bibliography ==
- David E. Wilt: The Mexican Filmography 1916 through 2001. McFarland & Co Inc, Jefferson NC 2004. ISBN 978-0-7864-6122-6
- Rodrãguez, Paul A. Schroeder. “Latin American Silent Cinema: Triangulation and the Politics of Criollo Aesthetics.” Latin American Research Review, vol. 43, no. 3, 2008, pp. 33–58. JSTOR [JSTOR], doi:10.1353/lar.0.0049.
