= The Grey Car =

- Directed by: Enrique Rosas
- Written by: José Manuel Ramos, Enrique Rosas, Miguel Necoechea
- Produced by: Enrique Rosas
- Starring: María Tereza Montoya; Juan Canals de Homs; Juan Manuel Cabrera; Ángel Esquivel; Ángel Esquivel
- Production company: Azteca Films – Rosas y Cía
- Release date: December 11, 1919
- Running time: 117 minutes
- Country: Mexico

The Grey Car (Spanish: El automóvil gris) is a 1919 Mexican action film directed by Enrique Rosas which is the number 98 in 100 Mexican best movies.

== Synopsis ==
Detective Cabrera wants to re-establish peace in Mexico City after a vandalism wave.
