= Carmen Molina =

Carmen Molina may refer to:

- Carmen Molina (Breaking Bad), a character in Breaking Bad
- Carmen Molina (actress) (1920–1998), Mexican actress
