= The Martyr of Calvary =

1952 film

- Directed by: Miguel Morayta
- Written by: Gonzalo Elvira Sánchez de Aparicio; Miguel Morayta
- Produced by: Gonzalo Elvira; Raúl Mendizábal
- Starring: Enrique Rambal
- Cinematography: Jorge Stahl Jr.
- Edited by: José W. Bustos
- Release date: 2 April 1952
- Running time: 113 minutes
- Country: Mexico
- Language: Spanish

The Martyr of Calvary (Spanish: El Mártir del Calvario) is a 1952 Mexican drama film directed by Miguel Morayta about the life of Christ. It was entered into the 1954 Cannes Film Festival.

== Cast ==
- Enrique Rambal - Jesús (as Enrique Rambal Jr.)
- Manuel Fábregas - Judas (as Manolo Fabregas)
- Consuelo Frank - María Madre
- Alicia Palacios - Magdalena
- Miguel Ángel Ferriz - Pedro
- Carmen Molina - Marta
- José María Linares-Rivas - Caifás (as Jose Mª. Linares Rivas)
- Felipe de Alba - Andrés
- Luis Beristáin - Jefe Sinagoga
- Miguel Arenas - José de Arimatea
- Lupe Llaca - Verónica
- Alberto Mariscal - Anás el Joven
- Alfonso Mejía - Marcos
- José Baviera - Poncio Pilatos
- Fernando Casanova - Centurión
