= Luis Beristáin =

Mexican actor

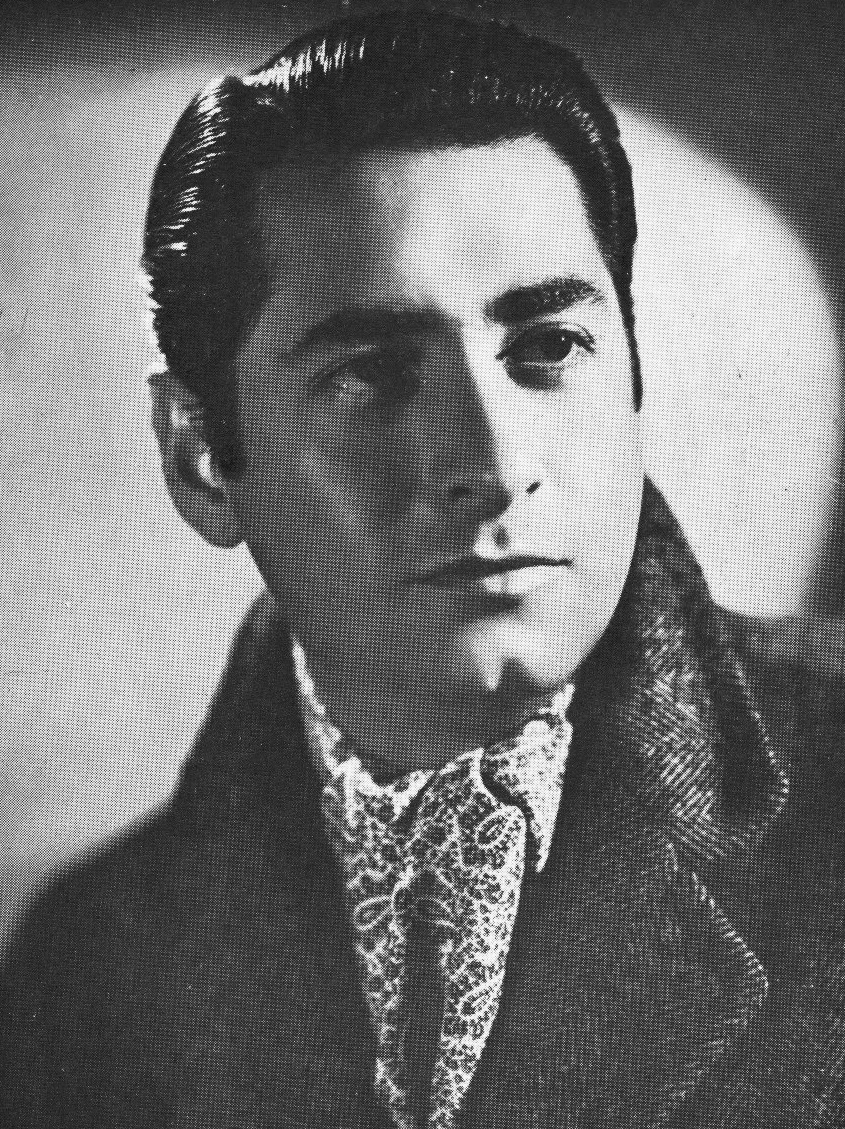
- Luis Beristáin in 1954
- Born: 20 June 1918; Mexico City, Mexico
- Died: 1 April 1962 (aged 43); Mexico City, Mexico
- Occupation: Actor
- Years active: 1945–1962
- Children: 3 sons

Luis Beristáin (20 June 1918 – 1 April 1962) was a Mexican film and television actor.

== Selected filmography ==
- Tragic Wedding (1946)
- Ecija's Seven Children (1947)
- The Secret of Juan Palomo (1947)
- Hypocrite (1949)
- Doctor on Call (1950)
- The Devil Is a Woman (1950)
- Women's Prison (1951)
- Among Lawyers I See You (1951)
- Get Your Sandwiches Here (1951)
- Tenement House (1951)
- Crime and Punishment (1951)
- The Martyr of Calvary (1952)
- The Trace of Some Lips (1952)
- The Plebeian (1953)
- My Mother Is Guilty (1960)

== Bibliography ==
- Edwards, Gwynne. A Companion to Luis Buñuel. Tamesis Books, 2005.
