= The Man Without a Face (1950 film) =

1950 film

- Directed by: Juan Bustillo Oro
- Written by: Juan Bustillo Oro
- Produced by: Juan Bustillo Oro; Gonzalo Elvira
- Starring: Arturo de Córdova; Carmen Molina; Miguel Ángel Ferriz
- Cinematography: Jorge Stahl Jr.
- Edited by: Jorge Bustos
- Music by: Raúl Lavista
- Production company: Oro Films
- Distributed by: Azteca Films
- Release date: 7 July 1950
- Running time: 91 minutes
- Country: Mexico
- Language: Spanish

The Man Without a Face (Spanish: El hombre sin rostro) is a 1950 Mexican mystery thriller film directed by Juan Bustillo Oro and starring Arturo de Córdova, Carmen Molina and Miguel Ángel Ferriz. It was shot at the Tepeyac Studios in Mexico City. The film's sets were designed by the art director Javier Torres Torija.

== Cast ==
- Arturo de Córdova as Juan Carlos Lozano
- Carmen Molina as Ana Maria
- Miguel Ángel Ferriz as Dr. Eugenio Britel
- Queta Lavat as Rosa Martínez
- Chela Campos as Cantante
- Fernando Galiana as Detective en Guadalajara
- Armando Sáenz as Novio de Rosa
- Ramón Sánchez as Hampón en cabaret
- Kika Meyer as Prostituta asesinada
- Wolf Ruvinskis as El Monstruo
- Julio Daneri as Jefe de Detectives
- Matilde Palou as Madre de Juan Carlos

== Bibliography ==
- Brill, Olaf (ed.) Expressionism in the Cinema. Edinburgh University Press, 2016.
- Reyes, Alvaro A. Fernández . Crimen y suspenso en el cine mexicano 1946-1955. El Colegio de Michoacán, 2007.
- Segre, Erica. Intersected Identities: Strategies of Visualisation in Nineteenth- and Twentieth-century Mexican Culture. Berghahn Books, 2007.
