= Carlos Villarías =

Spanish actor (1892–1976)

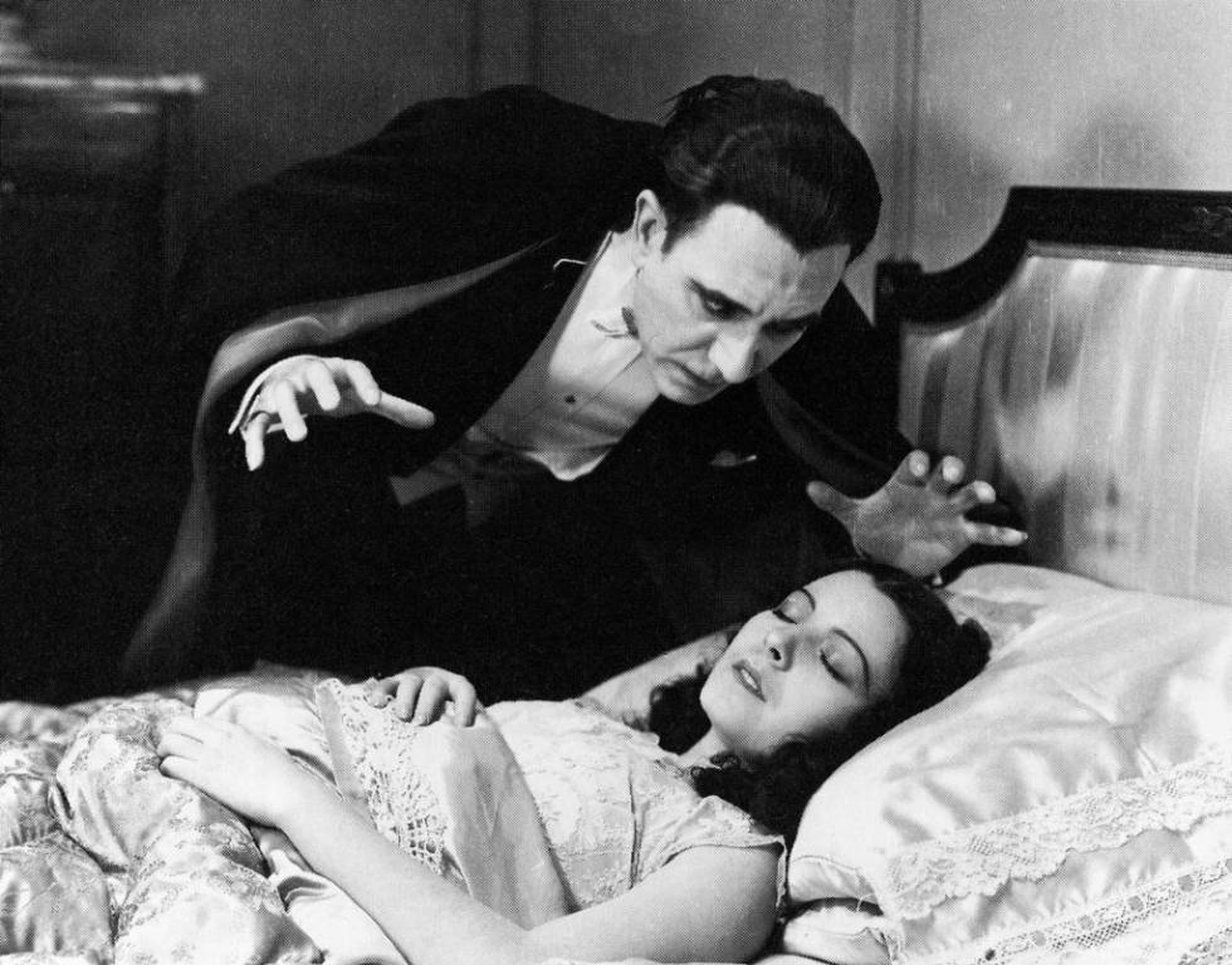
- Villarías as Count Dracula leaning over Lupita Tovar in Dracula
- Born: 7 July 1892; Córdoba, Spain
- Died: 27 April 1976 (aged 83); Los Angeles, California, U.S.
- Occupation: Actor
- Years active: 1917–1953

Carlos Villarías (7 July 1892 – 27 April 1976) was a Spanish actor born in Córdoba who died in California, United States. He is best known for his title role in the Spanish-language version of Dracula (1931), costarring Barry Norton and Lupita Tovar. The film was shot at night on the same sets used for the English-language version, starring Bela Lugosi.

== Selected filmography ==
Year	Title
1931	Dracula
1931	Road of Hell
1933	The California Trail
1935	The Mystery of the Ghastly Face
1937	Come on Ponciano
1938	Mis dos amores
1939	Frontiers of '49
1939	La Inmaculada
1943	Father Morelos
1944	Summer Hotel
1944	The Daughter of the Regiment
1944	Gran Hotel
1945	The Museum of Crime
1947	The Private Life of Mark Antony and Cleopatra
1947	Ecija's Seven Children
1947	The Secret of Juan Palomo
1948	Adventure in the Night
1949	Zorina
1949	Lola Casanova
