= Dracula (1931 English-language film) =

American film by Tod Browning

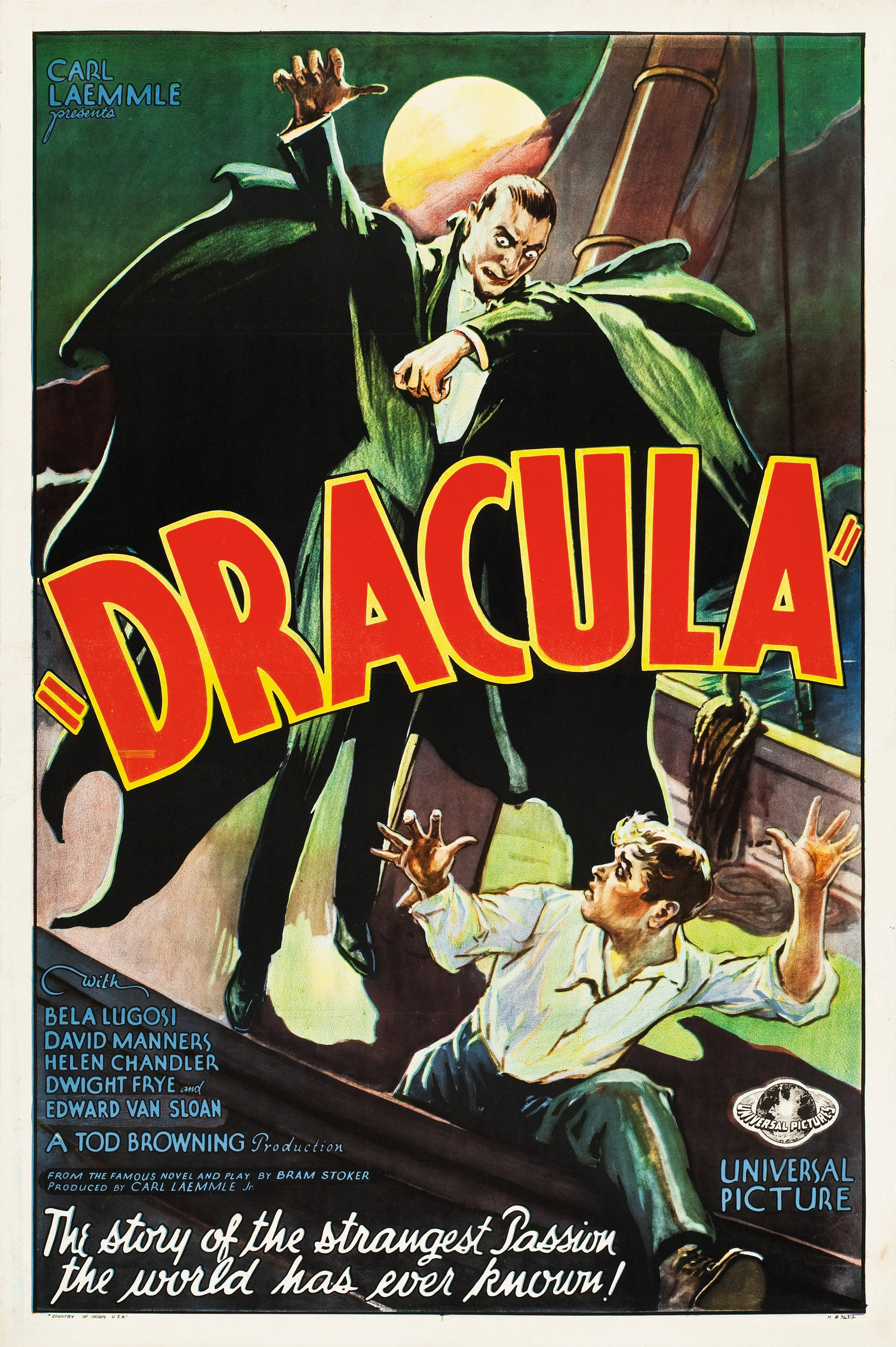
- Theatrical release poster
- Directed by: Tod Browning
- Screenplay by: Garrett Fort
- Based on: Dracula 1897 novel by Bram Stoker; Dracula 1924 play by Hamilton Deane and John L. Balderston
- Produced by: Tod Browning; Carl Laemmle Jr.
- Starring: Bela Lugosi; David Manners; Helen Chandler; Dwight Frye; Edward Van Sloan
- Cinematography: Karl Freund
- Edited by: Milton Carruth; Maurice Pivar
- Production company: Universal Pictures
- Distributed by: Universal Pictures
- Release dates: February 12, 1931 (New York); February 14, 1931 (United States)
- Running time: 74 minutes
- Country: United States
- Languages: English; Hungarian
- Budget: $341,191

Trailer

Dracula is a 1931 American pre-Code vampire film directed and co-produced by Tod Browning from a screenplay written by Garrett Fort and starring Bela Lugosi in the title role. It is based on the 1924 stage play Dracula by Hamilton Deane and John L. Balderston, which in turn is adapted from the 1897 novel Dracula by Bram Stoker. Lugosi portrays Count Dracula, a vampire who emigrates from Transylvania to England and preys upon the blood of living victims, including a young man's fiancée.

Produced and distributed by Universal Pictures, Dracula is the first sound film adaptation of the Stoker novel. Several actors were considered to portray the title character, but Lugosi, who had previously played the role on Broadway, eventually got the part. The film was partially shot on sets at Universal Studios Lot in California, which were reused at night for the filming of a concurrently produced Spanish-language adaptation of the same name, also produced by Universal.

Dracula was a commercial and critical success upon release and led to several sequels and spin-offs. It has had a notable influence on popular culture, and Lugosi's portrayal of Dracula established the character as a cultural icon, as well as the archetypal vampire in later works of fiction. In 2000, the film was selected by the United States Library of Congress for preservation in the National Film Registry as "culturally, historically, or aesthetically significant". As a published work from 1931, Dracula will enter the American public domain on January 1, 2027.

== Plot ==
Renfield is a solicitor traveling to Count Dracula's castle in Transylvania on a business matter. The local village people fear that vampires inhabit the castle and warn Renfield not to go there. Renfield refuses to stay at the village inn and asks his carriage driver to take him to the Borgo Pass. He is driven to the castle by Dracula's coach, with Dracula disguised as the driver. En route, Renfield sticks his head out of the window to ask the driver to slow down, but instead finds that the driver has disappeared, and a bat is leading the horses.

Renfield enters the castle and is welcomed by the charming and eccentric Count, who, unbeknownst to Renfield, is a vampire. They discuss Dracula's intention to lease Carfax Abbey in England, where he intends to travel the next day. Dracula drugs and hypnotizes Renfield into opening a window. Renfield faints as a bat appears, and Dracula's three wives close in on him. Dracula waves them away, then attacks Renfield himself.

Aboard the schooner Vesta, Renfield has become a raving servant to Dracula, who hides in a coffin and feeds on the ship's crew. When the ship reaches England, Renfield is discovered to be the only living person. He is sent to Dr. Seward's sanatorium adjoining Carfax Abbey. Elsewhere, at a London theater, Dracula meets Seward. Seward introduces his daughter Mina, her fiancé John Harker, and a family friend, Lucy Weston. Lucy is fascinated by Dracula. That night, Dracula enters her room and feasts on her blood while she sleeps. She dies the next day after a string of blood transfusions.

Renfield is obsessed with eating flies and spiders. Polymath doctor Professor Van Helsing analyzes his blood and discovers his obsession. He starts talking about vampires, and that afternoon, Renfield begs Seward to send him away, claiming his nightly cries may disturb Mina's dreams. When Dracula calls Renfield through the medium of a wolf howling, Renfield is disturbed by Van Helsing showing him wolfsbane, which Van Helsing says is used for protection from vampires.

Dracula visits Mina, asleep in her bedroom, and bites her. The next evening, he enters for a visit, and Van Helsing and Harker notice that he does not have a mirror reflection. When Van Helsing reveals this to Dracula, he smashes the mirror and leaves. Van Helsing deduces that Dracula is the vampire behind the recent tragedies.

Mina leaves her room and runs to Dracula in the garden, where he attacks her. The maid finds her. Harker wants to take Mina to London for safety, but is convinced to leave her with Van Helsing. Van Helsing orders Nurse Briggs to take care of Mina when she sleeps and not to remove the wreath of wolfsbane from her neck.

Renfield escapes from his cell and listens to the men discussing vampires. Before he is taken back to his cell, Renfield relates to them how Dracula convinced Renfield to allow him to enter the sanatorium by promising him thousands of rats full of blood and life. Dracula enters the Seward parlor and talks with Van Helsing. He states that Mina now belongs to him and warns Van Helsing to return to his home country. Van Helsing swears to excavate Carfax Abbey and destroy Dracula. Dracula attempts to hypnotize Van Helsing, but the latter's resolve proves stronger. As Dracula lunges at Van Helsing, he draws a crucifix from his coat, forcing Dracula to retreat.

Harker visits Mina on a terrace, and she speaks of how much she loves "nights and fogs". A bat flies above them and squeaks to Mina. She then attacks Harker, but Van Helsing and Seward save him. Mina confesses that Dracula has cursed her to become a vampire herself after she dies naturally and tells Harker their love is finished.

Dracula hypnotizes Briggs into removing the wolfsbane from Mina's neck and opening the windows. Van Helsing and Harker see Renfield heading for Carfax Abbey. Arriving there, they see Dracula with Mina. When Harker shouts to Mina, Dracula thinks Renfield has betrayed him by leading them there and shoves him down the staircase to his death. Dracula is hunted by Van Helsing and Harker, who know that Dracula is forced to sleep in his coffin during daylight, and the sun is rising. Van Helsing prepares a makeshift wooden stake from Dracula's coffin lid while Harker searches for Mina. Van Helsing impales Dracula through the heart, killing him, and Mina returns to normal.

== Cast ==
- Bela Lugosi as Count Dracula
- Helen Chandler as Mina Harker
- David Manners as John Harker
- Dwight Frye as Renfield
- Edward Van Sloan as Van Helsing
- Herbert Bunston as Dr. Seward
- Frances Dade as Lucy Weston
- Joan Standing as Nurse Briggs (in an error on the opening credits, she is misidentified as "Maid")
- Charles K. Gerrard as Martin

These individuals appear in uncredited roles: Director and co-producer Tod Browning was the off-screen voice of the harbormaster; Carla Laemmle, a cousin of producer Carl Laemmle Jr., appears at the start of the film as a woman in the coach carrying Renfield; Geraldine Dvorak, Cornelia Thaw, and Dorothy Tree appear as Dracula's brides.

== Background ==
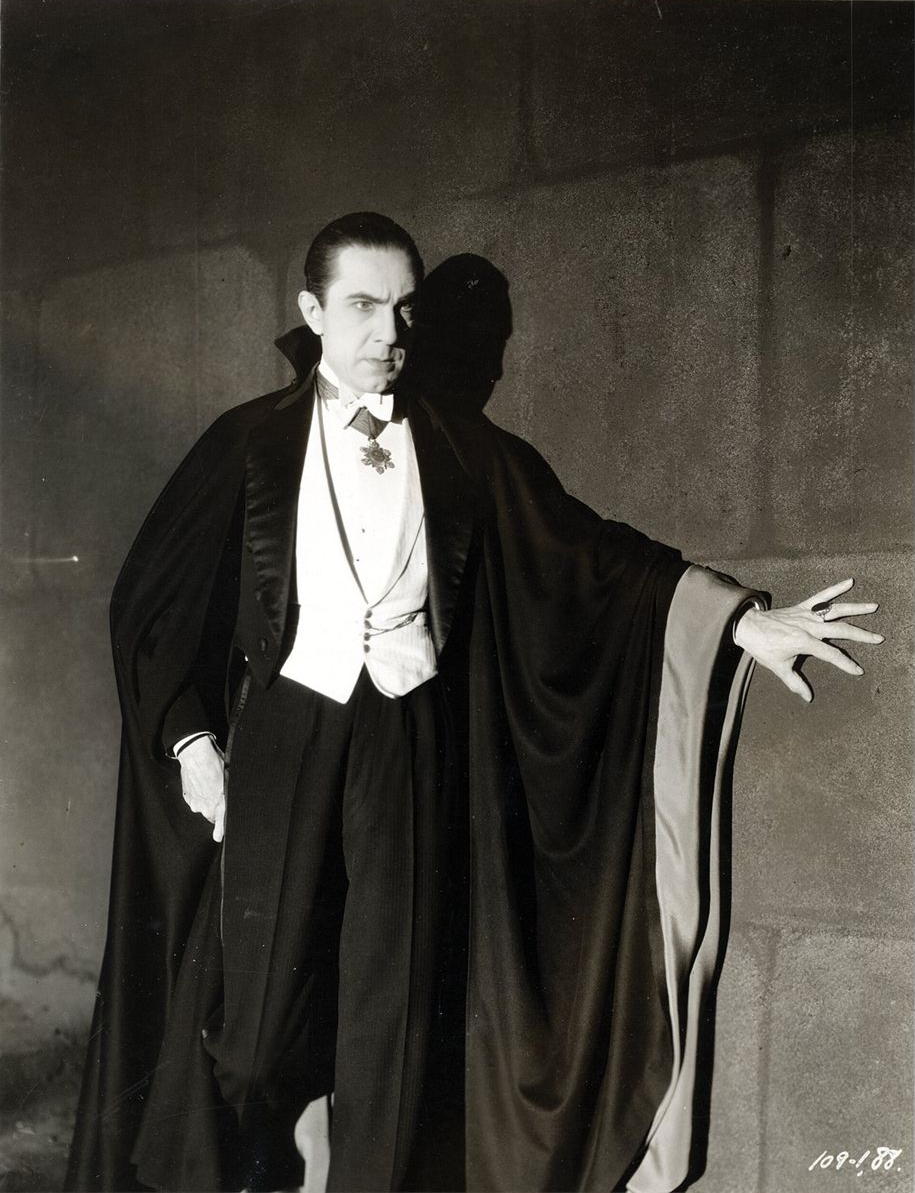
Bela Lugosi as Dracula

Bram Stoker's novel had already been filmed without permission as Nosferatu in 1922 by German Expressionist filmmaker F. W. Murnau. Stoker's widow sued for plagiarism and copyright infringement, and the courts decided in her favor, essentially ordering that all prints of Nosferatu be destroyed.

Universal Pictures paid $40,000 for all rights to the novel and the stage plays, so they would have the exclusive rights to the Dracula character. Universal also brought Pulitzer Prize-winning novelist Louis Bromfield to pen the script to fit this grand-scale vision. Bromfield tried to reconcile the novel and the stage play, and in his draft, he suggested that Dracula should be two people, a ghoulish old man at the beginning of the film, who by traveling to London and feeding on blood gets rejuvenated into the drawing-room Dracula of the theater. Jonathan Harker was supposed to travel to Transylvania in the opening scenes of the film. As in the stage play, Dracula was supposed to kiss Mina passionately on the lips. Those things never made it into movie, either because they were considered too expensive, were replaced by rewritten scenes, or were deemed too risky. Bromfield was soon replaced with Garrett Fort.

== Production ==
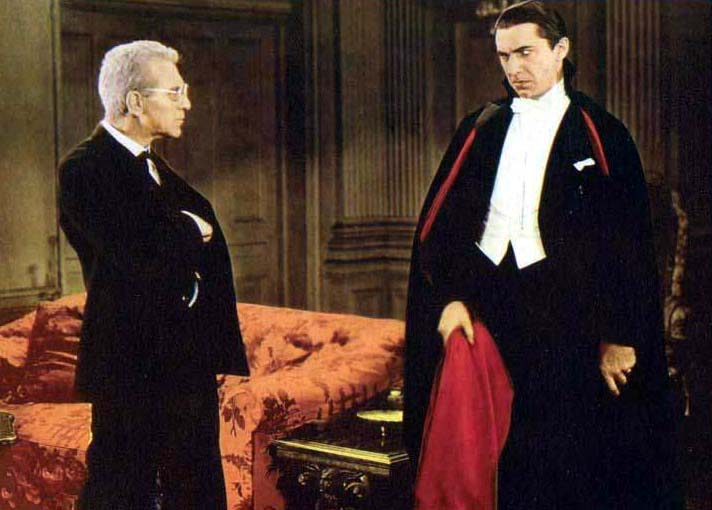
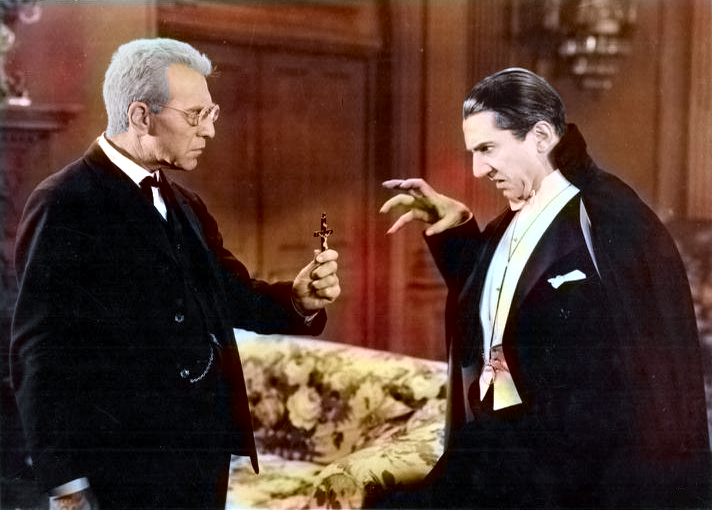
Colorized lobby cards of Edward Van Sloan as Van Helsing confronting Bela Lugosi as Dracula in the film

The film was originally intended for Conrad Veidt, who had just appeared in Universal's The Man Who Laughs (1928) and The Last Performance (1929). When Veidt returned to Germany fearing his English was not good enough for talkies, Universal looked to Lon Chaney, star of the studio's The Hunchback of Notre Dame (1923) and The Phantom of the Opera (1925). At the time, Chaney was under contract to Metro-Goldwyn-Mayer and had already decided a remake of The Unholy Three (1930) would be his first sound film. After his sudden death, casting the title role proved problematic. Initially, Laemmle was not at all interested in Lugosi, in spite of good reviews for his stage portrayal. Laemmle instead considered more established screen actors, with John Wray, fresh from his success in All Quiet on the Western Front (1930) being announced as cast in the role. Both Ian Keith and William Courtenay would be subsequently mentioned in the press of the time, with other actors considered, including Paul Lukas, Paul Muni, Chester Morris, and Joseph Schildkraut. Lugosi had played the role on Broadway, and to his good fortune, happened to be in Los Angeles with a touring company of the play when the film was being cast. Against the tide of studio opinion, Lugosi lobbied hard and ultimately won the executives over, due in part to him accepting a paltry $500 per week salary for seven weeks of work, amounting to $3,500.Lew Ayres was hired to play Jonathan Harker, only to be replaced with Robert Ames because of a filming conflict. Ames was himself replaced with David Manners following news reports of his messy divorce.

On September 29, 1930, Dracula began shooting at Universal City on a $355,050 budget on a 36-day schedule. Tod Browning shot scenes of Dracula's Castle and Borgo Pass in the first week of production. According to numerous accounts, the production is alleged to have been a mostly disorganized affair, (Note: In an interview with author and horror historian David J. Skal, David Manners (Jonathan Harker) claims he was so unimpressed with the chaotic production, he never once watched the film in the remaining 67 years of his life. However, in his DVD audio commentary, Skal adds, "I'm not sure I really believed him".) with the usually meticulous Tod Browning leaving cinematographer Karl Freund to take over during much of the shoot, making Freund something of an uncredited director on the film.

Manners recalled about the filming: "I can still see Lugosi, parading up and down the stage, posing in front of a full-length mirror, throwing his cape over his shoulder and shouting, 'I am Dracula!' He was mysterious and never really said anything to the other members of the cast, except "good morning" when he arrived and "good night" when he left. He was polite, but always distant". Lugosi struck Manners as a vain, eccentric performer: "I never thought he was acting, but being the odd man he was". Edward Van Sloan, who played Van Helsing on Broadway stage opposite Lugosi, reprised his role on screen. The actor wondered why the film version reduced the large mirror used in the play to the small cigarette box with a mirrored lid. (Note: In the original theatrical trailer (not shown above) Van Sloan performed the stage play's version of this scene to a wall-mounted mirror.)Despite Van Helsing becoming one of his most famous screen roles Van Sloan did not think much about the film – in a letter to his nephew he once wrote: "That reminds me of your failure to see the Dracula film on TV. How lucky you were.... What must it be like today...! Overplayed — over-written — altogether lousy". Bernard Jukes, who played the role of Renfield in the play on Broadway and during the 1928 tour, wanted that part in the film, but it went to Dwight Frye instead.

Tod Browning remembered actress Helen Chandler from the 1928 Broadway play The Silent House, and based on that maiden performance, chose her for Mina, the heroine, who becomes enslaved by Count Dracula. Her salary was $750 per week, making her the highest-paid member of the cast. At the time of the filming, she already battled severe alcoholism. She was known to laugh at Lugosi's mirror ritual at the shooting at times. Like some of her co-stars, despite this role becoming her most famous one, she did not care much about it: "It would be an awful fate, for instance, to go around being a pale little girl in a trance with her arms outstretched as in Dracula, all the rest of my screen career!"

At the beginning, the peasants are praying in Hungarian, and the signs in the village are also in Hungarian. That is because many Hungarians live near Borgo Pass in Transylvania, since Transylvania used to be part of Hungary since at the end of the 9th century, in the 19th century it was the Kingdom of Hungary within the Austro-Hungarian Empire. By the time the film was made, Transylvania had been part of the Kingdom of Romania since the end of World War I in 1920 by the Treaty of Trianon.

The scenes of crew members on the ship struggling in the violent storm were lifted from a Universal silent film, The Storm Breaker. Photographed at silent film projection speed, this accounts for the jerky, sped-up appearance of the footage when projected at 24 frames per second sound film speed and cobbled together with new footage of Dracula and Renfield. Jack Foley himself was the Foley artist who produced the sound effects. The picture was completed for a total cost of $341,191.20, which was under the original estimate of $355,050.

Before the film was even released, Lugosi worried that it would cause him to be type cast. He reportedly rejected an offer to reprise his role as Dracula in another stage tour of the play, stating: "No! Not at any price. When I'm through with this picture I hope to never hear of Dracula again. I cannot stand it...I do not intend that it shall possess me".

=== Cinematic process ===
The film's histrionics from the stage play are also reflected in its special effects, which are limited to fog, lighting, and large, flexible bats. Dracula's transition from bat to person is always done off-camera. The film also employs extended periods of silence and character close-ups for dramatic effect, and employs two expository intertitles and a closeup of a newspaper article to advance the story, a seeming holdover from silent films; a point made by online film critic James Berardinelli is that the actors' performance style seems to belong to the silent era. Director Tod Browning had a reputation as a silent film director, having made them since 1915, including 10 horror blockbusters with Lon Chaney, including The Unknown (1927), but he never felt completely at ease with sound films. He only directed six more films over an eight-year period, the best known being the notorious Freaks, a horror film with Olga Baclanova and a cast of actual carnival freaks that was pulled from distribution immediately, but is a cult favorite today. Browning directed his last film in 1939.

== Music ==
Owing to the costs of adding an original musical score to a film's soundtrack, no score had ever been composed specifically for the film. The music heard during the opening credits, an excerpt from Act II of Tchaikovsky's Swan Lake, was later reused for another Universal horror film, The Mummy (1932). During the theater scene where Dracula meets Dr. Seward, Harker, Mina, and Lucy, the end of the overture to Wagner's Die Meistersinger von Nürnberg can also be heard, as well as the dark opening of Schubert's "Unfinished Symphony" in B minor.

=== 1998 score ===
In 1998, composer Philip Glass was commissioned to compose a musical score for the film. The score was performed by the Kronos Quartet under the direction of Michael Reisman, Glass's usual conductor.

Of the project, Glass said: "The film is considered a classic. I felt the score needed to evoke the feeling of the world of the 19th century — for that reason I decided a string quartet would be the most evocative and effective. I wanted to stay away from the obvious effects associated with horror films. With [the Kronos Quartet] we were able to add depth to the emotional layers of the film".

The film, with this new score, was released by Universal Studios in 1999 in the VHS format. Universal's DVD releases allow the viewer to choose between the unscored soundtrack or the Glass score. The soundtrack, Dracula, was released by Nonesuch Records in 1999. Glass and the Kronos Quartet performed live during showings of the film in 1999, 2000, 2012 and 2017.

== Release ==
Dracula was a big gamble for a major Hollywood studio to undertake. In spite of the literary credentials of the source material, whether an American audience was prepared for a serious, full-length supernatural chiller was uncertain. Though American audiences had been exposed to other chillers before, such as The Cat and the Canary (1927), this was a horror story with no comic relief or trick ending that downplayed the supernatural. Despite this, Dracula proved to be a box-office success.

When the film finally premiered at the Roxy Theatre in New York City on February 12, 1931 (released two days later throughout the U.S.), newspapers reported that members of the audiences fainted in shock at the horror on screen. This publicity, shrewdly orchestrated by the film studio, helped ensure people came to see the film, if for no other reason than curiosity. Within 48 hours of its opening at the Roxy, it had sold 50,000 tickets, building a momentum that culminated in a $700,000 profit, the largest of Universal's 1931 releases.

=== Critical reception ===
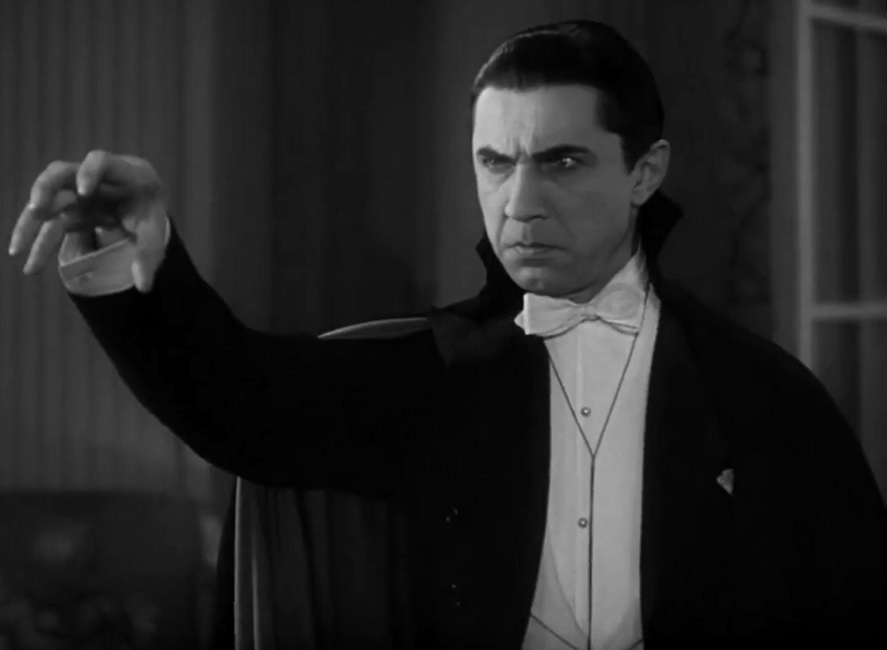
Bela Lugosi as Count Dracula

The film was generally well received by critics upon its release. Mordaunt Hall of The New York Times called it "the best of the many mystery films", characterizing Browning's direction as "imaginative" and Helen Chandler's performance as "excellent". Variety praised the film for its "remarkably effective background of creepy atmosphere" and wrote: "It is difficult to think of anybody who could quite match the performance in the vampire part of Bela Lugosi, even to the faint flavor of foreign speech that fits so neatly". Film Daily declared the film "a fine melodrama" and remarked that Lugosi had created "one of the most unique and powerful roles of the screen". Time called it "an exciting melodrama, not as good as it ought to be but a cut above the ordinary trapdoor-and-winding-sheet type of mystery film". John Mosher of The New Yorker wrote a negative review, remarking, "there is no real illusion in the picture" and "this whole vampire business falls pretty flat". The Chicago Tribune did not think the film was as scary as the stage version, calling its framework "too obvious" and "its attempts to frighten too evident", but still concluded that it was "quite a satisfactory thriller".

== Censorship ==
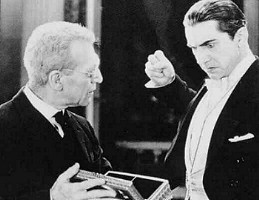
Edward Van Sloan (Van Helsing) showing Lugosi a mirror.

The film was originally released with a run time of 85 minutes; when it was reissued in 1936, the Production Code was enforced. For that reissue, two scenes are known to have been censored:

- Audio of Dracula's off-camera "death groans" at the end of the film were shortened by partial muting, as were Renfield's screams as he is killed; these pieces of soundtrack were later restored by MCA-Universal for its LaserDisc and subsequent DVD releases (with the exception of the 2004 multifilm "Legacy Collection" edition).
- The most significant deletion was an epilogue that played only during the film's initial run and was removed out of fear of encouraging a belief in the supernatural. In a scene similar to the prologue from Frankenstein, and also featuring Universal stalwart Edward Van Sloan, he reappeared in a "curtain speech" and informed the audience: "Just a moment, ladies and gentlemen! A word before you go. We hope the memories of Dracula and Renfield won't give you bad dreams, so just a word of reassurance. When you get home tonight and the lights have been turned out and you are afraid to look behind the curtains—and you dread to see a face appear at the window—why, just pull yourself together and remember that after all, there are such things as vampires!" This scene survived in a print from the British Film Institute but it was deemed "unusable" by Universal and only briefly shown in the Road to Dracula documentary. In April 2026, the missing epilogue was restored using silent 16 mm footage from a private collector, with audio reconstructed using generative AI.

== Alternative versions ==
In the early days of sound films, Hollywood studios commonly produced "foreign-language versions" of their films using the same sets, costumes, and so on. While Browning filmed during the day, at night George Melford used the sets to make the Spanish-language version starring Carlos Villarías as Conde Drácula. Long thought lost, a print of the Spanish Dracula was discovered in the 1970s, of which large sections had rotted away. In the early 1990s, a good copy was found in Cuba. The film was preserved in the National Film Registry of the Library of Congress.

A third, silent, version of the film was also released. In 1931, some theaters had not yet been wired for sound, and during this transition period, many studios released alternative silent versions with intertitles.

== Legacy ==
=== Retrospective assessments ===
In 1999, film critic Roger Ebert of the Chicago Sun-Times gave the film four out of four stars, praising Lugosi's performance and Freund's cinematography. He noted the film's lasting influence, and included it in his list of "Great Movies". Angie Errigo of Empire gave the film four out of five stars, commending Lugosi's performance as "the [Dracula] against which all others are measured", and writing that the film "is stagey and creaky, but it also has wonderful, unforgettable moments". John Oliver of the British Film Institute credited the film with establishing the "popular on-screen image of the vampire" and wrote that "the cinematic horror genre was born with the release of Dracula". He concluded that although he feels the film becomes almost "overly stage bound in its middle section, the virtues of its star performance and general visual style outweigh any such deficits".

On the review aggregator website Rotten Tomatoes, the film has an approval rating of 96% based on 52 reviews, with an average rating of 7.86/10. The site's critical consensus reads: "Bela Lugosi's timeless portrayal of Dracula in this creepy and atmospheric 1931 film has set the standard for major vampiric roles since". On Metacritic, which uses a weighted average, assigned Dracula a score of 71 out of 100 based on 10 critics, indicating "generally favorable" reviews.

=== Sequels and influence ===
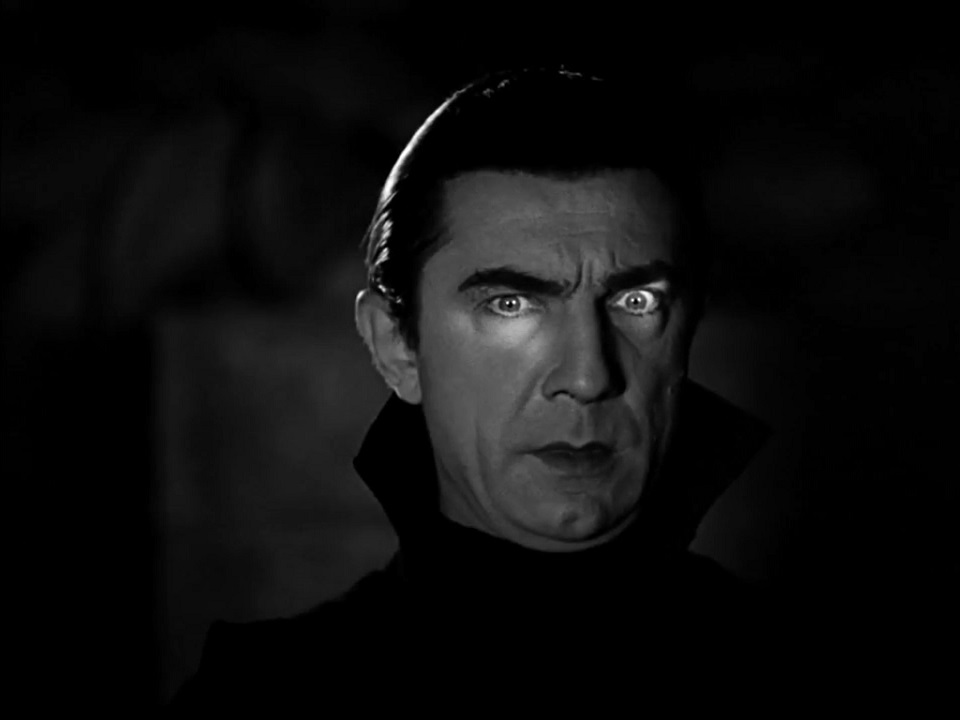
Bela Lugosi as Dracula

After the commercial and critical success of Dracula, Universal released Frankenstein (1931) later that year. Universal in particular would become the forefront of early horror cinema, with a canon of films including The Mummy (1932), The Invisible Man (1933), Bride of Frankenstein (1935), and The Wolf Man (1941).

Five years after the original release, Universal released Dracula's Daughter (1936), a direct sequel that starts immediately after the end of the first film. A second sequel, Son of Dracula (1943), starring Lon Chaney Jr., followed another seven years later. The Count returned to life in three more Universal films of the mid-1940s: House of Frankenstein (1944), House of Dracula (1945), and the comedy Abbott and Costello Meet Frankenstein (1948).

Universal would only cast Lugosi as Dracula in one more film, the aforesaid Abbott and Costello vehicle, giving the role to John Carradine for the mid-1940s "monster rally" films, although Carradine admittedly more closely resembled Stoker's physical description from the book. Many of the familiar images of Dracula are from stills of the older Lugosi made during the filming of the 1948 comedy, so two confusingly distinct incarnations of Lugosi as Dracula remain, 17 years apart in age.

As Lugosi played a vampire in three other movies during his career (Mark of the Vampire (1935), The Return of the Vampire (1943), and Mother Riley Meets the Vampire (1952)), this contributed to the public misconception that he portrayed Dracula on film many times, although the other vampire roles had him playing Dracula in all but name.

Director Chris McKay referenced Dracula in his film Renfield (2023), a film referred to by the director as a "quasi-sequel" to the original 1931 film. The film features Nicolas Cage as Count Dracula and Nicholas Hoult as Renfield compositing them into the background in place of Lugosi and Frye.

Since its release, Dracula has become widely regarded as a classic of the era and of its genre. In 2000, it was selected for preservation in the National Film Registry by the Library of Congress. It was also ranked 79th on Bravo's countdown of The 100 Scariest Movie Moments.

Dracula ultimately became a role that would prove to be both a blessing and a curse. Despite his earlier stage successes in a variety of roles, from the moment Lugosi donned the cape on screen, he was forever type cast as the Count.

Browning went on to direct Lugosi once more in another vampire thriller, Mark of the Vampire, a 1935 remake of Browning's lost silent film London After Midnight (1927) starring Lon Chaney.

Also, the film is recognized by American Film Institute in these lists:

- 2001: AFI's 100 Years...100 Thrills – #85
- 2003: AFI's 100 Years...100 Heroes & Villains:
  - Count Dracula – #33 Villain
- 2005: AFI's 100 Years...100 Movie Quotes:
  - Count Dracula: "Listen to them. Children of the night. What music they make." – #83

==== Influence on other notable Draculas ====
The actors who followed in Lugosi's shoes in playing Dracula, and who achieved significant fame in that role, had different attitudes to Lugosi's portrayal.

Christopher Lee, who played Dracula in a series of Hammer movies, said: "Anyhow, about the Lugosi Dracula. I was so disappointed. I absolutely had been wanting to see it for a long, long time. There are aspects of it, for instance, that I considered ridiculous. Dracula is played too nice at the beginning. Practically no menace in the character .. There is no shock or fright in it. Lugosi's hands too ... He held them out stiffly... making him look like a puppet. His smile was not always sinister, either". While thinking that Lugosi was in his younger days a wonderful looking man, who had tremendous presence and personality, Lee also thought that Lugosi "was not the right man to play Dracula from the point of view of nationality. Because Transylvania is in Romania and he was a Hungarian from the town of Lugos, hence his name". At the time that Bram Stoker wrote the novel, however, Transylvania was part of the Kingdom of Hungary, and about a million ethnic Hungarians still live there today. In addition to this, Lugoj, the town from which Lugosi came, is located in what can be considered Transylvania.

Gary Oldman, who played Dracula in Francis Ford Coppola's adaptation, considered Lugosi to be his favorite Dracula and said about his performance: "He was really on to something: the way he moved, the way he sounded". Oldman based his Dracula voice on Lugosi's voice.

=== Posters ===
The film's poster campaign was overseen by Universal advertising art director Karoly Grosz, who also illustrated the "insert" poster himself. Original posters from the 1931 release are scarce and highly valuable to collectors. In 2009, actor Nicolas Cage auctioned off his collection of vintage film posters, which included an original "Style F" one sheet that sold for $310,700; as of March 2012, it stood as the sixth-highest price for a film poster. In summer 2017, Metallica guitarist Kirk Hammett loaned his rare "Style C" poster to the Peabody Essex Museum in Salem, Massachusetts for an exhibition on horror film posters. In December that same year, an extremely rare "Style A" poster—one of only two known copies—sold at auction for $525,000, setting a new world record for the most expensive film poster.

Original 1931 posters

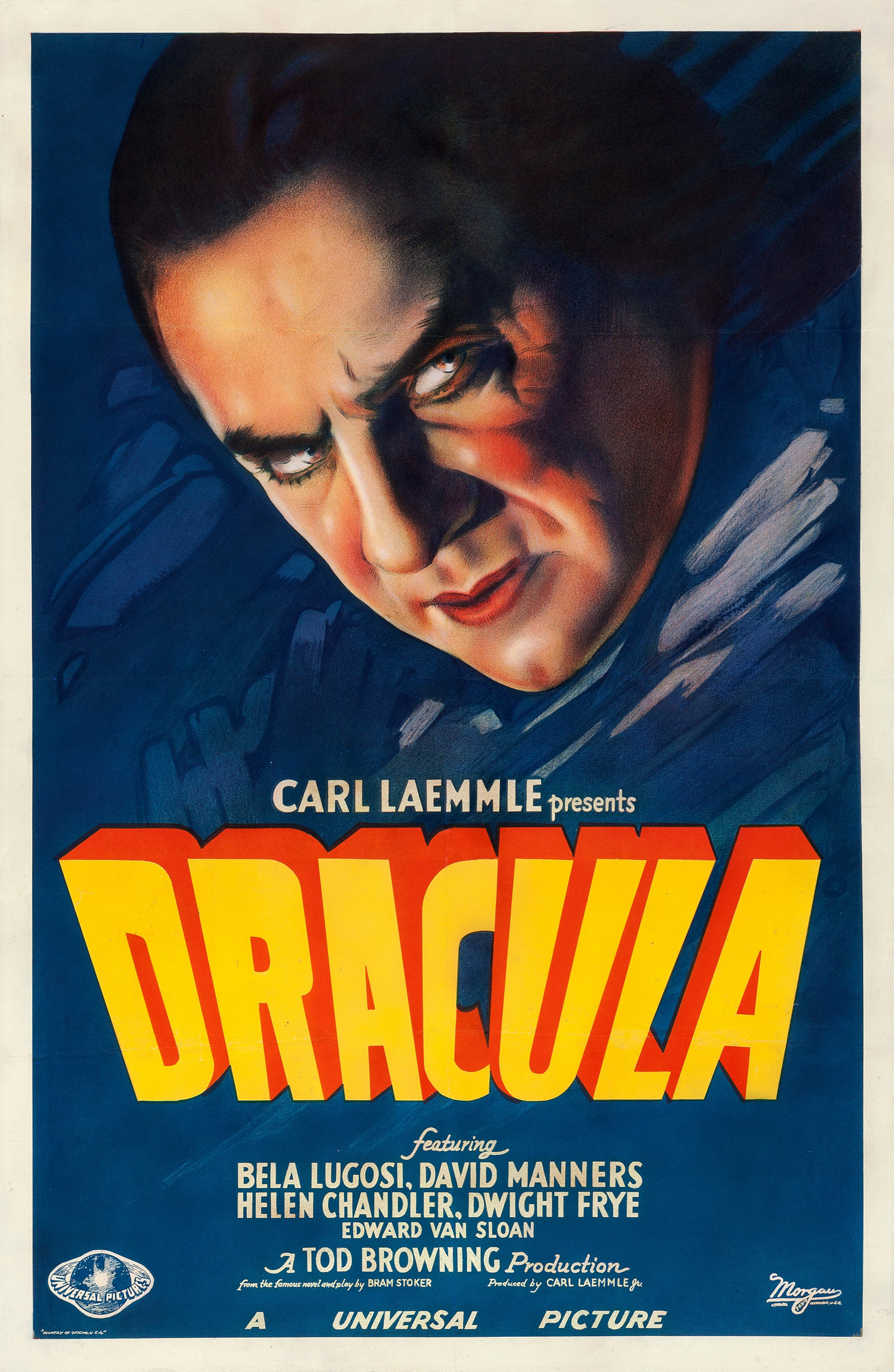
Style A one-sheet – most valuable film poster in the world in 2017

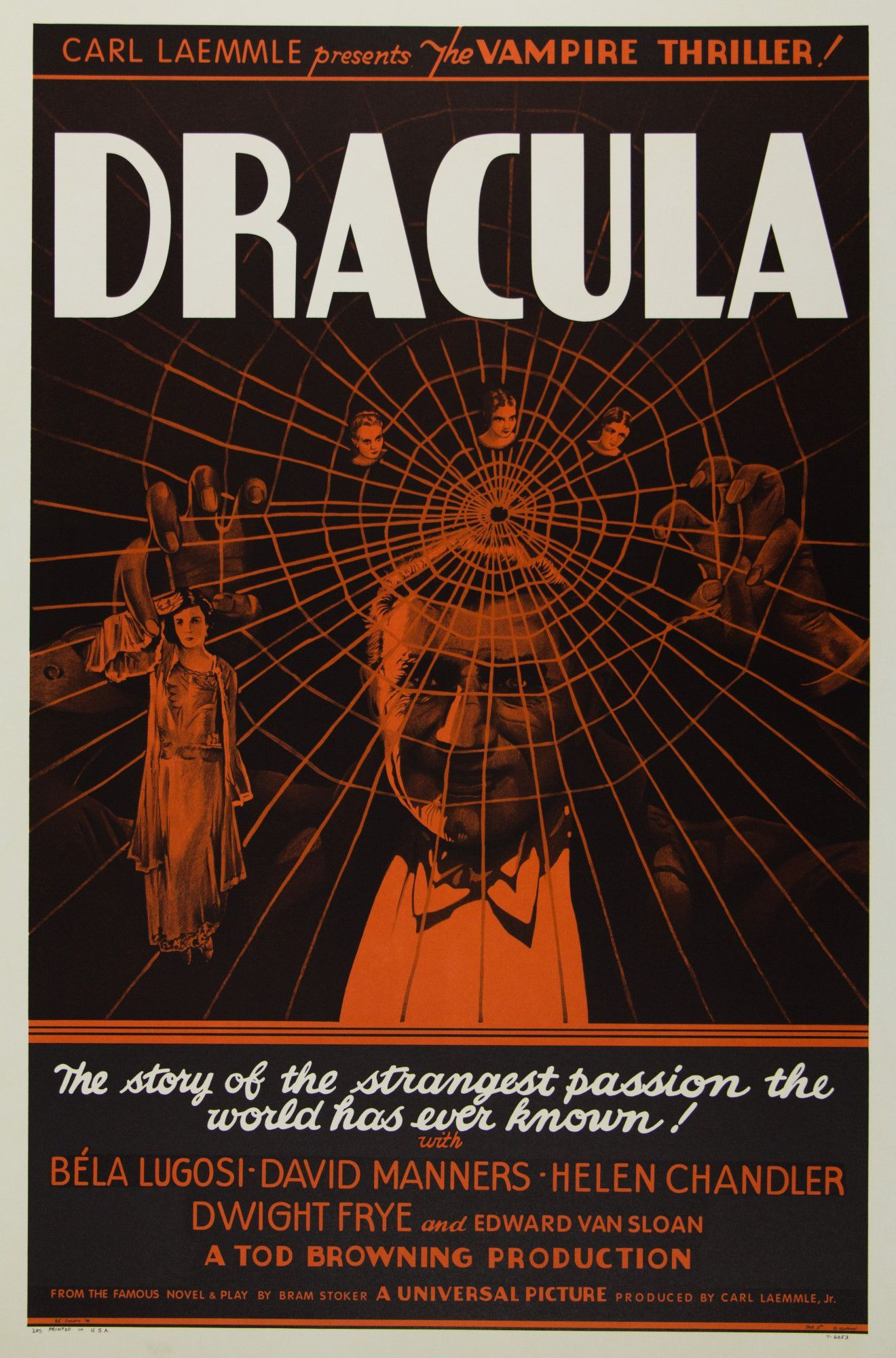
Style B one-sheet

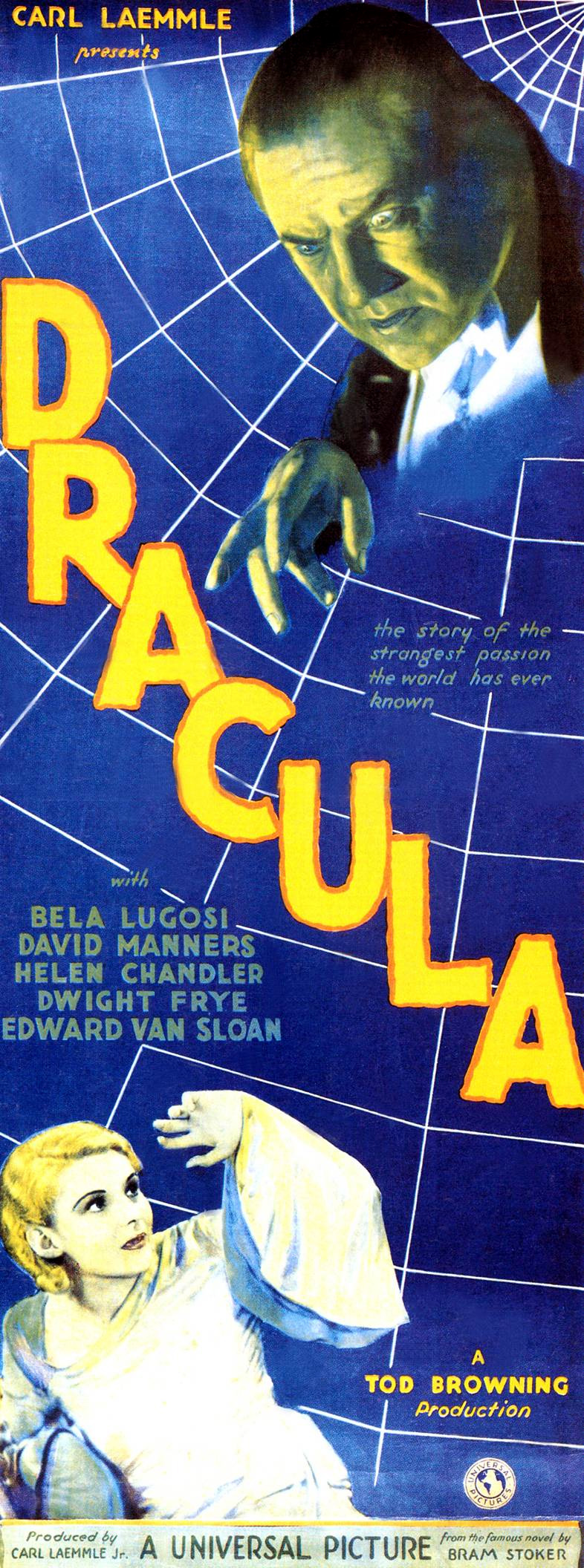
"Insert" poster by Karoly Grosz

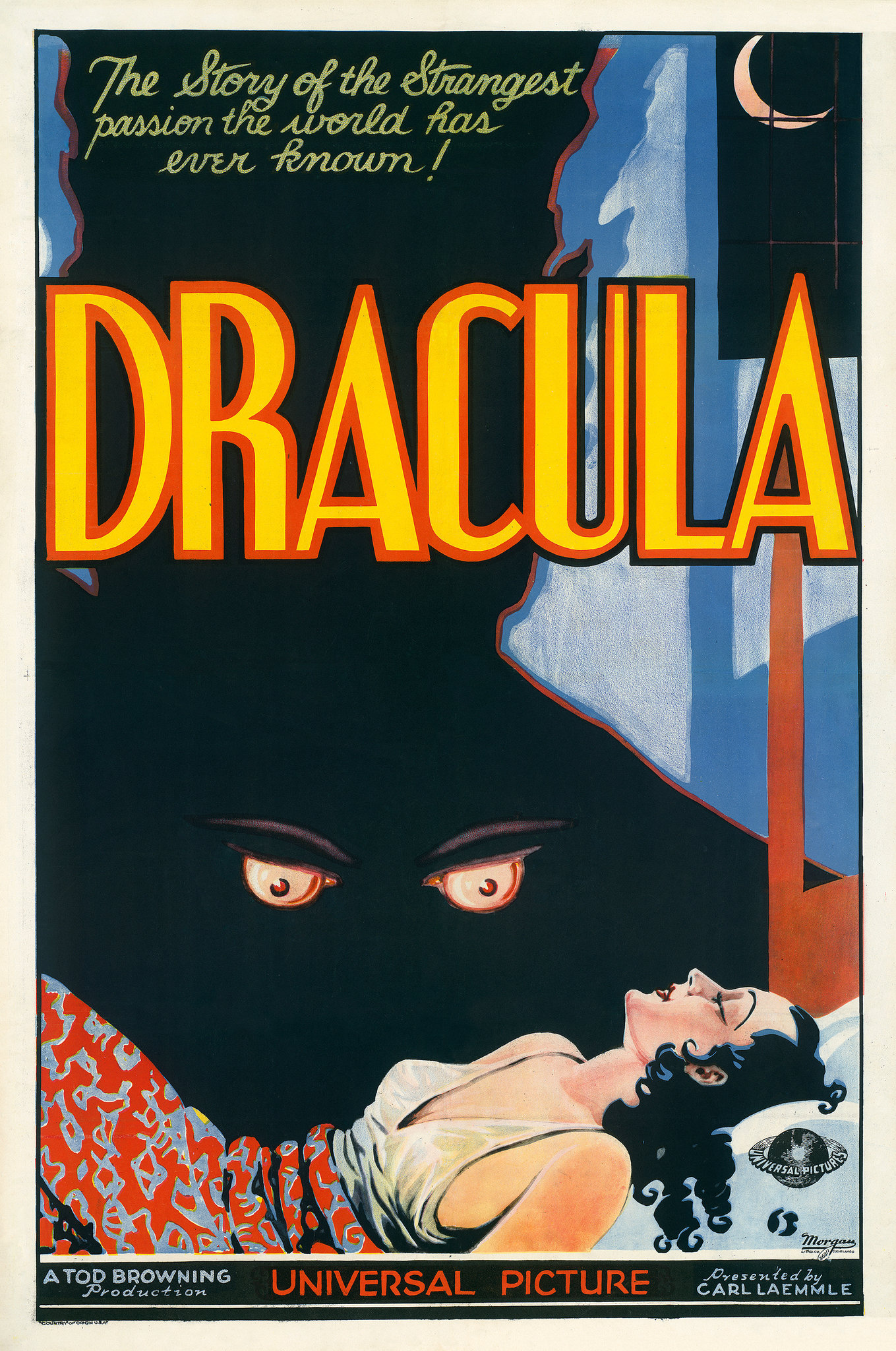
Style C one-sheet — scan of the copy owned by Kirk Hammett as of 2017

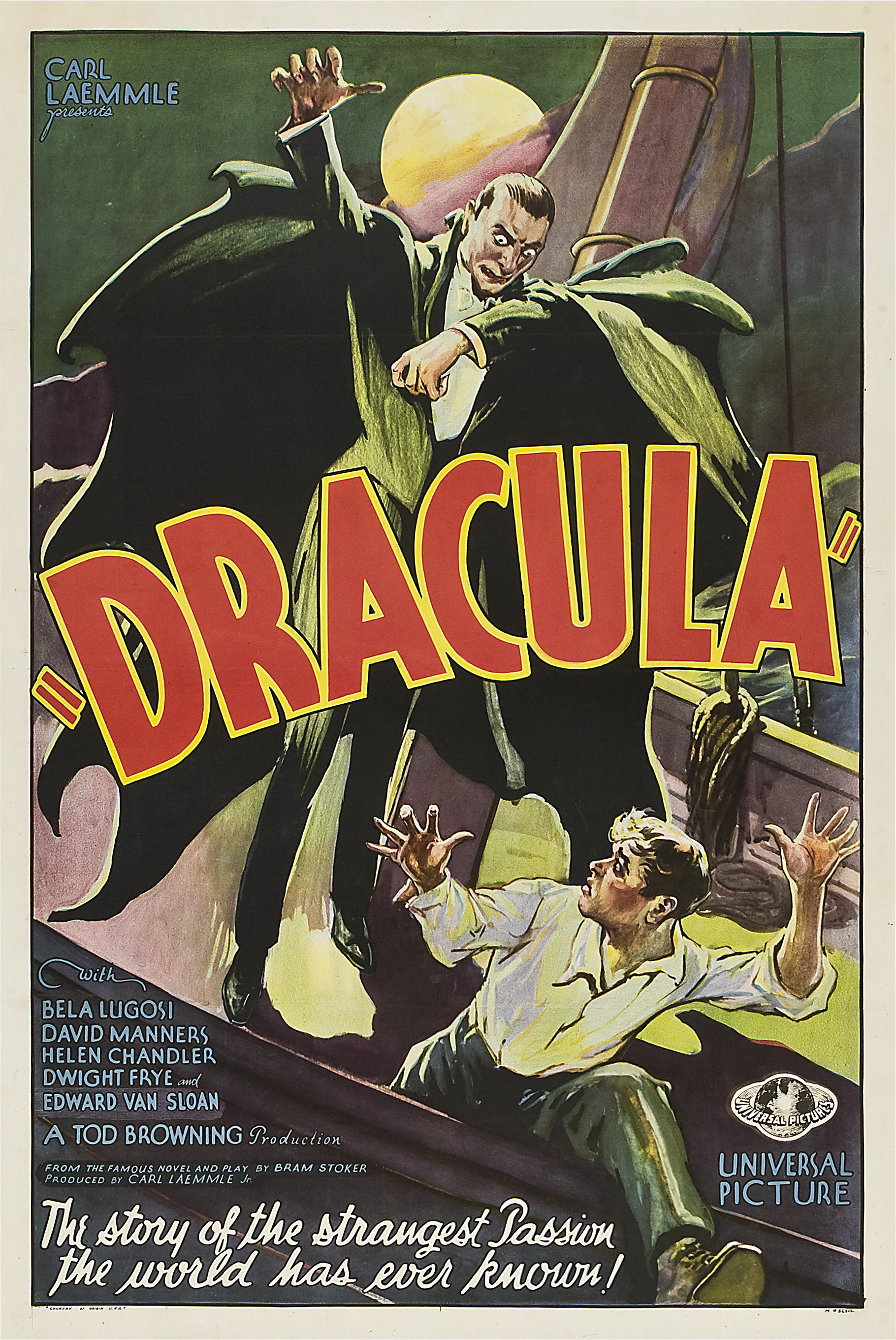
Style F one-sheet — scan of the copy sold by Nicolas Cage in 2009

After the film's original theatrical run, several theatrical reissues were promoted with new poster designs.

Theatrical reissue posters

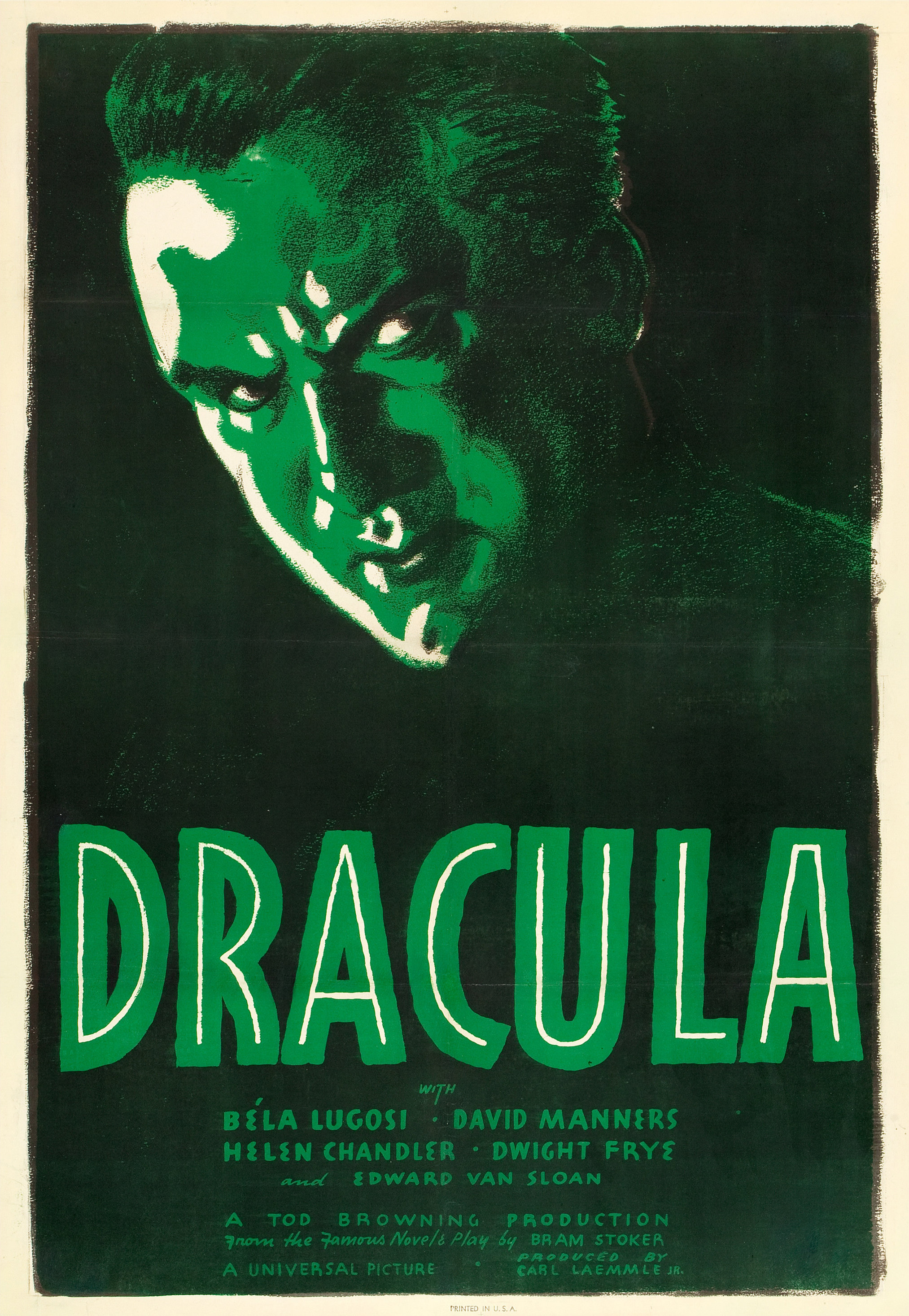
1938 one-sheet by Universal

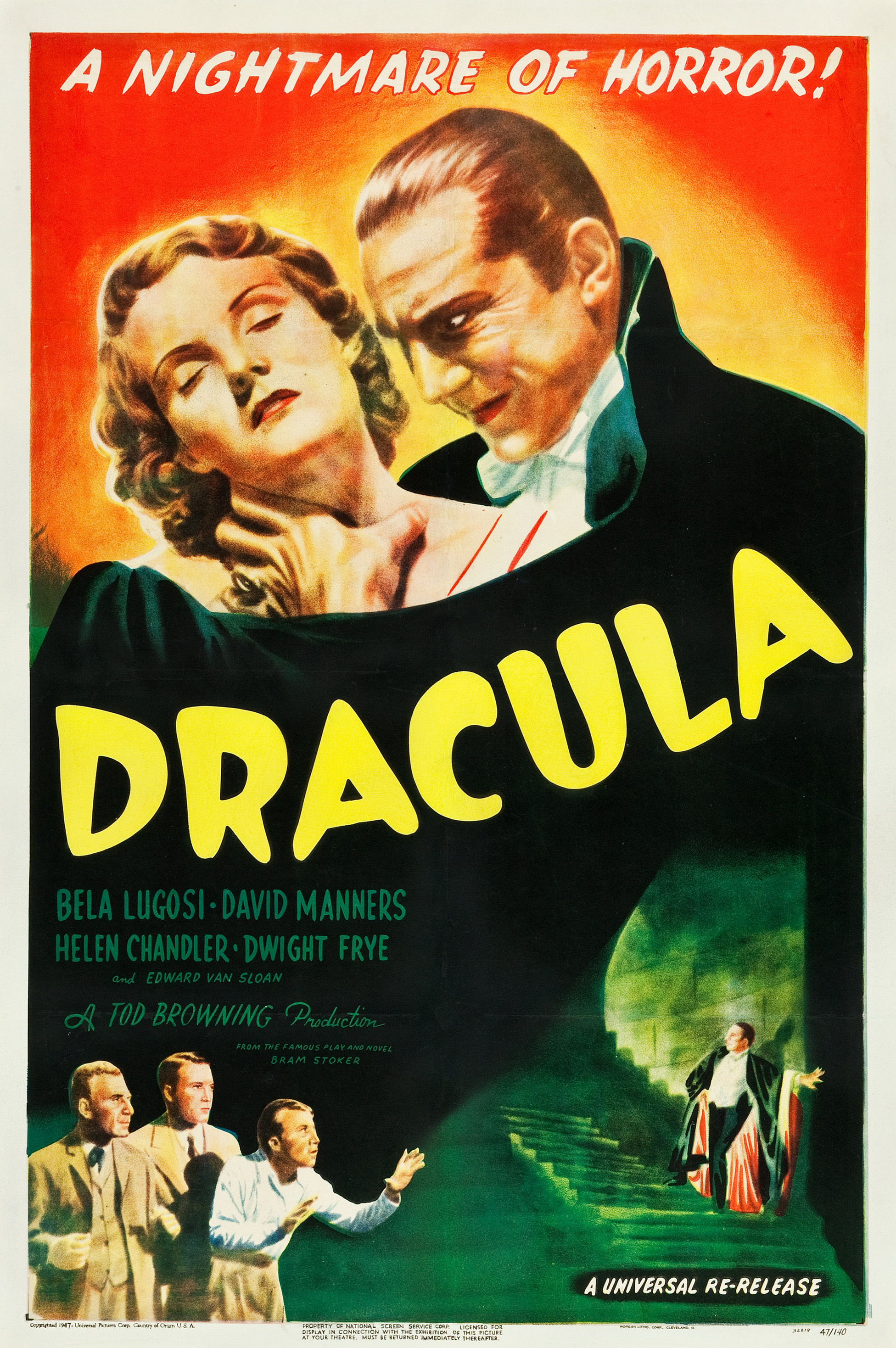
1947 one-sheet by Universal

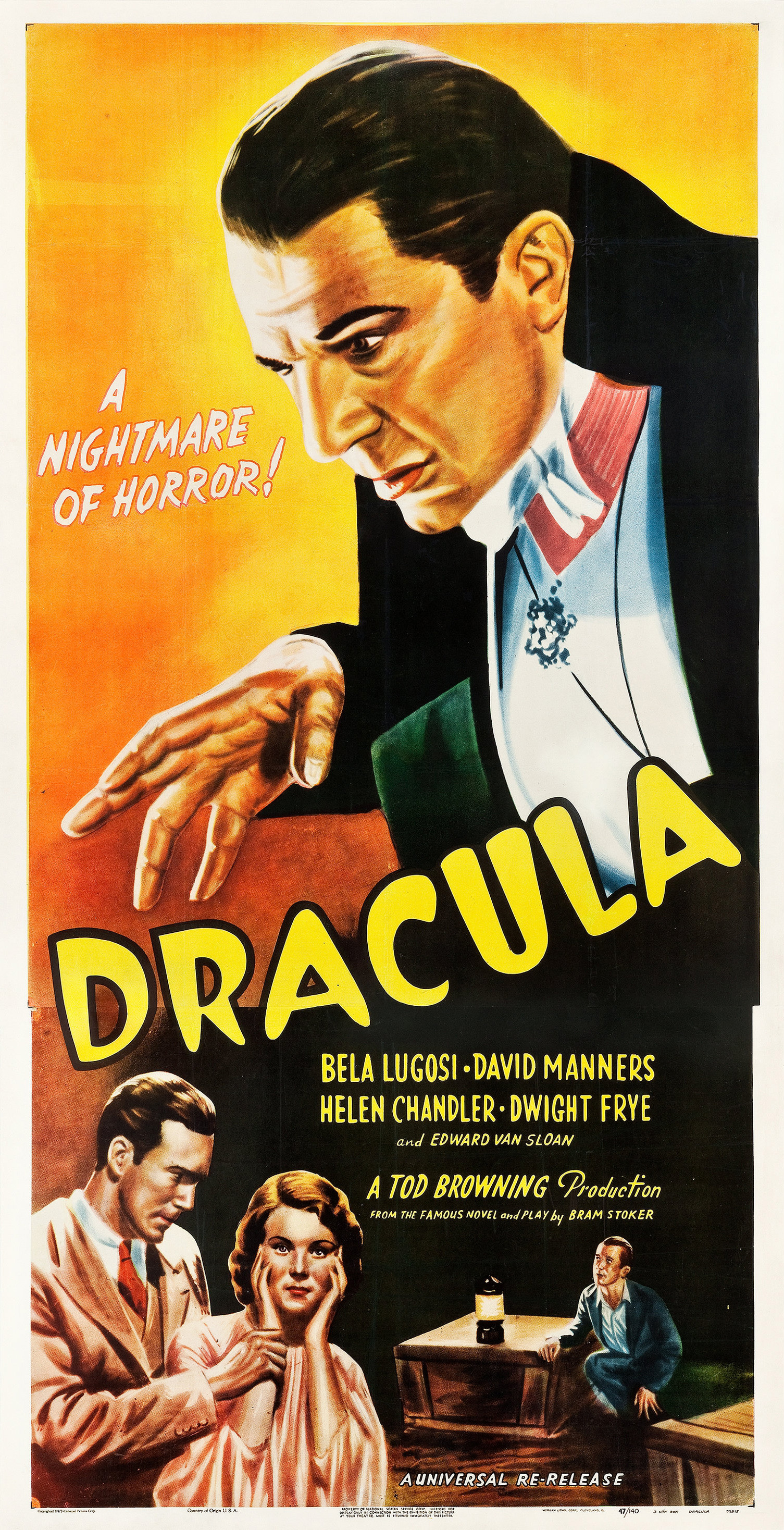
1947 three-sheet by Universal

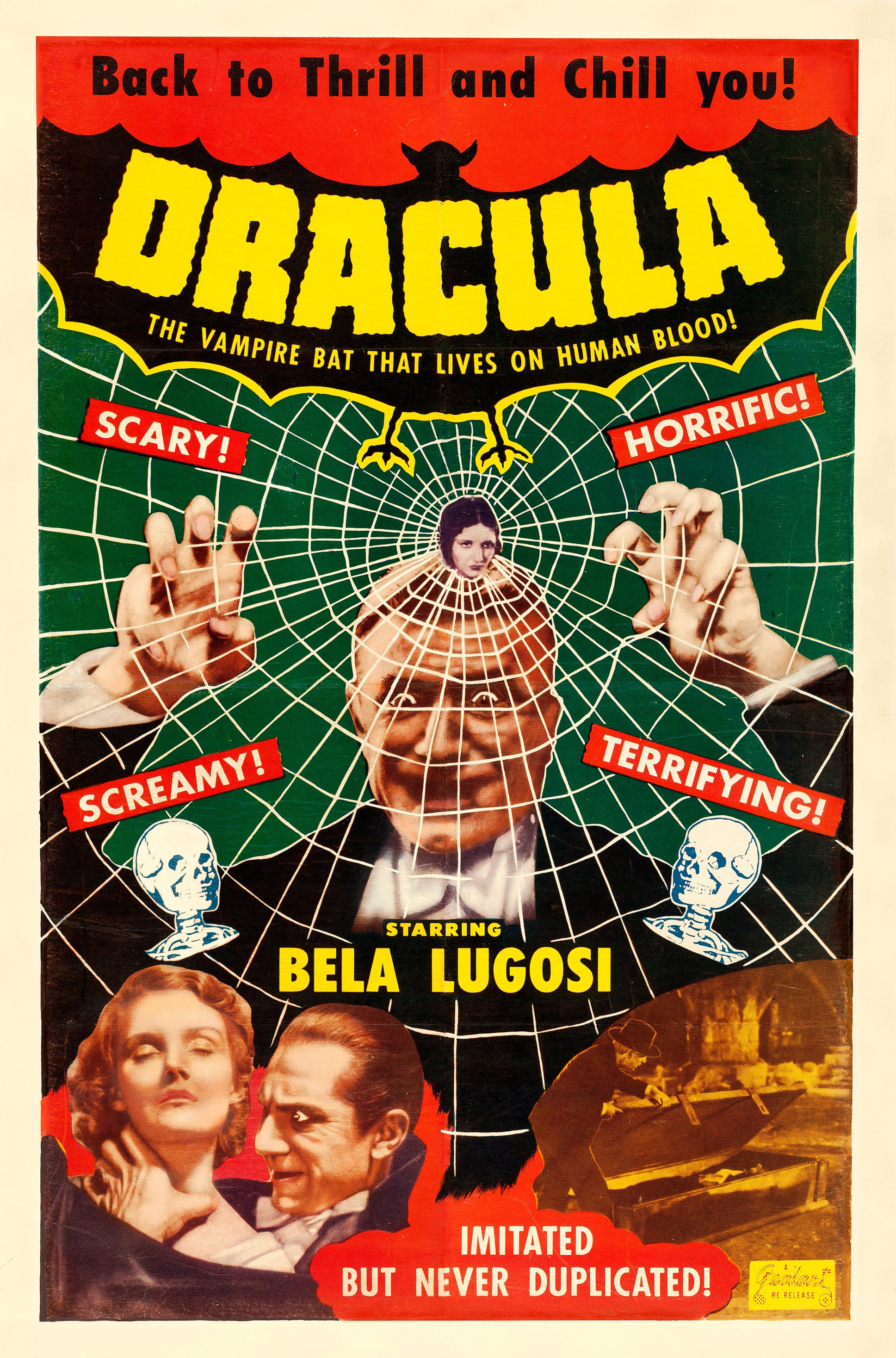
1951 one-sheet by Realart

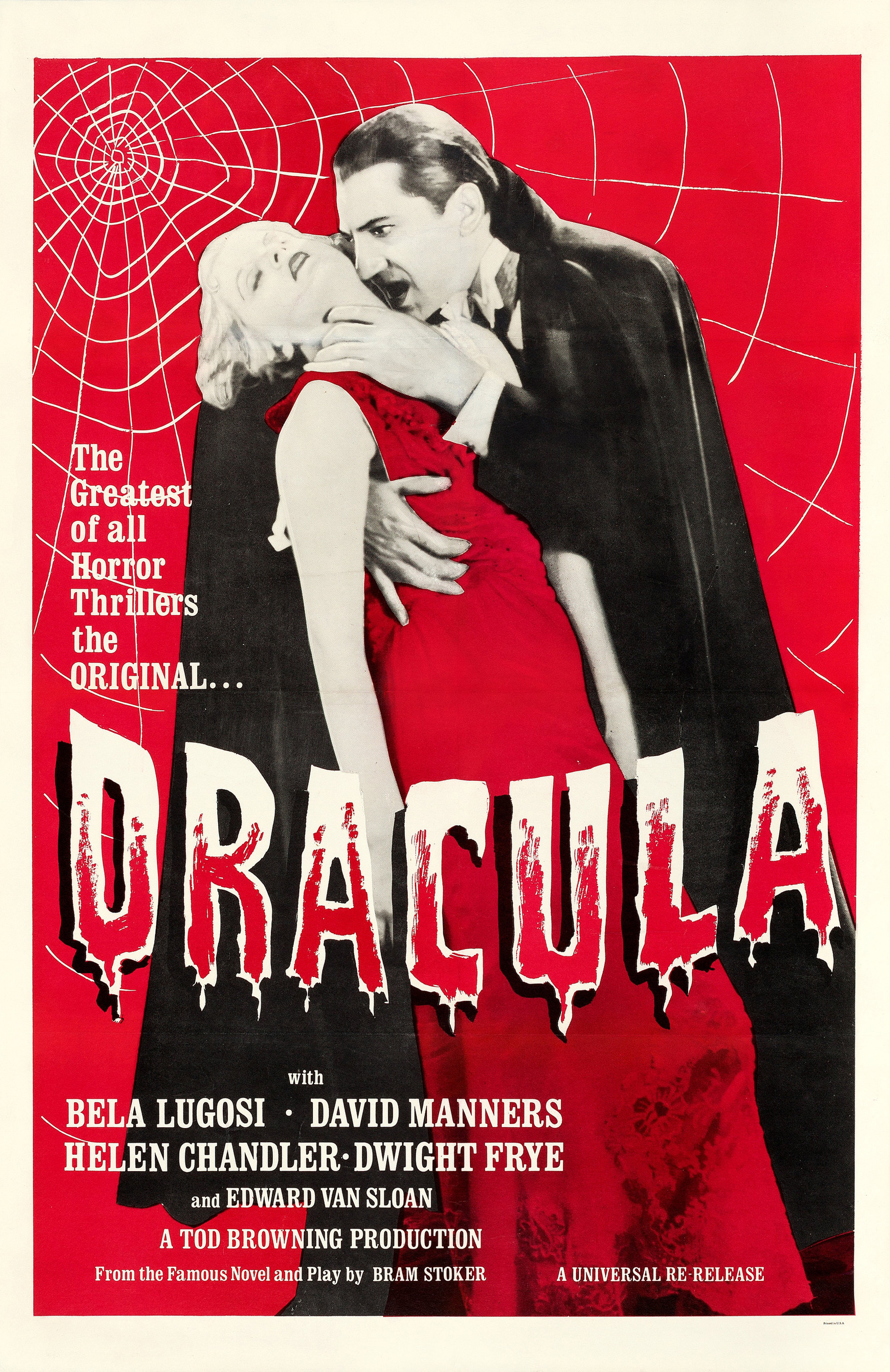
1960s one-sheet by Universal

=== Iconography ===
This film, and the 1920s stage play by Deane and Balderston, contributed much of Dracula's popular iconography, much of which vastly differs from Stoker's novel. In the novel and German silent film Nosferatu (1922), Dracula's appearance is repulsive; Lugosi portrays the Count as a handsome, charming nobleman. The Deane-Balderston play and this film also introduced the now-iconic images of Dracula entering his victims' bedrooms through French doors/windows, wrapping his satin-lined cape around victims, and more emphasis on Dracula transforming into a bat. In the Stoker novel, he variously transformed into a bat or a wolf, a mist or "elemental dust".

The now-classic Dracula line, "I never drink ... wine", is original to this film. It did not appear in Stoker's novel (although in the novel he does say "I do not sup.") or the original production of the play. When the play was revived on Broadway in 1977 starring Frank Langella, the line was added to the script.

Dracula's property at Purfleet is simply called Carfax in the novel; the film renames it Carfax Abbey.

== Home media ==
Between the 1960s and 1970s, Castle Films released an abridged version of Dracula on 8 mm film. In the 1980s, MCA Home Video released Dracula on Betamax, VHS, and Capacitance Electronic Disc (CED). In the 1990s, MCA/Universal Home Video released Dracula on VHS as part of the "Universal Monsters Classic Collection", a series of releases of Universal Classic Monsters films. The film was also released on LaserDisc.

In 1999, Universal released Dracula on VHS and DVD as part of the "Classic Monster Collection". In 2004, Universal released Dracula: The Legacy Collection on DVD as part of the "Universal Legacy Collection". This two-disc release includes both Dracula and the Spanish-language Dracula, as well as Dracula's Daughter, Son of Dracula, and House of Dracula.

In 2012, Dracula and the Spanish-language Dracula were released on Blu-ray as part of the Universal Classic Monsters: The Essential Collection box set, which also includes a total of nine films from the Universal Classic Monsters series. In September 2013, Dracula received a standalone Blu-ray release that also includes the Spanish-language Dracula. That same year, Dracula was included as part of the six-film Blu-ray set Universal Classic Monsters Collection, which also includes Frankenstein, The Mummy, The Invisible Man, Bride of Frankenstein, and The Wolf Man. The following year, Universal released Dracula: Complete Legacy Collection on DVD. This set contains seven films: Dracula, Drácula, Dracula's Daughter, Son of Dracula, House of Frankenstein, House of Dracula, and Abbott and Costello Meet Frankenstein. In 2015, the six-film Universal Classic Monsters Collection was released on DVD. In 2016, Dracula received a Walmart-exclusive Blu-ray release featuring a glow-in-the-dark cover. In September 2017, the film received a Best Buy-exclusive SteelBook Blu-ray release with cover artwork by Alex Ross. That same year, the seven-film Complete Legacy Collection was released on Blu-ray.

In August 2018, Dracula, the Spanish-language Dracula, Dracula's Daughter, Son of Dracula, House of Frankenstein, House of Dracula, and Abbott and Costello Meet Frankenstein were included in the Universal Classic Monsters: Complete 30-Film Collection Blu-ray box set. This box set also received a DVD release. Later in October, Dracula and the Spanish-language Dracula were included as part of a limited edition Best Buy-exclusive Blu-ray set titled Universal Classic Monsters: The Essential Collection, which features artwork by Alex Ross. Universal Pictures Home Entertainment released Dracula on 4K Ultra HD Blu-ray on October 5, 2021.

== See also ==
- Bela Lugosi filmography
- Dracula in popular culture
- Dracula (1979), based on the same Deane/Balderston play
- Gothic film – Notable films
- Universal Classic Monsters
