= Ecija's Seven Children =

1947 film

- Directed by: Miguel Morayta
- Written by: Miguel Morayta; Faustino Nadal Silva; Rafael M. Saavedra
- Based on: Ecija's Seven Children by Manuel Fernández y González
- Produced by: Francisco Ortiz Monasterio
- Starring: Julián Soler; Rosario Granados; Luis Beristáin
- Cinematography: Jorge Stahl Jr.
- Edited by: Fernando Martinez
- Music by: Luis Hernández Bretón
- Production company: Producciones México
- Distributed by: CIFESA (Spain)
- Release date: 3 July 1947
- Running time: 95 minutes
- Country: Mexico
- Language: Spanish

Ecija's Seven Children (Spanish: Los siete niños de Écija) is a 1947 Mexican historical drama film directed by Miguel Morayta and starring Julián Soler, Rosario Granados and Luis Beristáin. The film's sets were designed by the art director Javier Torres Torija. It is based on the novel of the same title by Manuel Fernández y González set during the Peninsular War. It was followed by a sequel The Secret of Juan Palomo.

== Cast ==
- Julián Soler
- Rosario Granados
- Luis Beristáin
- Pepita Meliá
- Rafael Banquells
- Roberto Banquells
- Florencio Castelló
- Alejandro Cobo
- Roberto Corell
- Rafael María de Labra
- María Douglas
- Haydee Gracia
- Francisco Jambrina
- Jorge Mondragón
- Anita Muriel
- Nicolás Rodríguez
- Mercedes Soler
- Hernán Vera
- Carlos Villarías

== Bibliography ==
- Carredano, Consuelo & Picún, Olga. Huellas y rostros: exilios y migraciones en la construcción de la memoria musical de Latinoamérica. Universidad Nacional Autónoma de México, 2017
- Hammer, Tad Bentley . International film prizes: an encyclopedia. Garland, 1991.
- Riera, Emilio García. Historia documental del cine mexicano: 1945. Ediciones Era, 1969.
