= The Black Sheep (1949 film) =

1949 film

- Directed by: Ismael Rodríguez
- Written by: Rogelio A. González; Ismael Rodríguez
- Produced by: Manuel R. Ojeda
- Starring: Fernando Soler; Pedro Infante; Andrés Soler
- Cinematography: Jack Draper
- Edited by: Fernando Martínez Álvarez
- Music by: Raúl Lavista
- Production company: Producciones Rodríguez Hermanos
- Release date: 24 December 1949
- Running time: 104 minutes
- Country: Mexico
- Language: Spanish

The Black Sheep (Spanish: La oveja Negra) is a 1949 Mexican drama film directed by Ismael Rodríguez and starring Fernando Soler, Pedro Infante and Andrés Soler. It was shot at the Tepeyac Studios in Mexico City. The film's sets were designed by the art director Carlos Toussaint. It was followed by a sequel filmed in the same year, No desearás la mujer de tu hijo.

== Cast ==
- Fernando Soler as Don Cruz Treviño Martínez de la Garza
- Pedro Infante as Silvano Treviño
- Andrés Soler as Tío Laureano
- Dalia Íñiguez as Doña Bibiana
- Virginia Serret as Justina
- Amelia Wilhelmy as Nana Agustina
- Amanda del Llano as Marielba
- Antonio R. Frausto as Nicho
- Francisco Jambrina as Sotero
- Guillermo Bravo Sosa as Jacinto
- José Muñoz as Chucho
- Salvador Quiroz as Doctor
- José Pardavé as José
- Wolf Ruvinskis as El Campeón Asesino
- Leopoldo Ávila as Representante del campeón

== Bibliography ==
- Mraz, John. Looking for Mexico: Modern Visual Culture and National Identity. Duke University Press, 2009.
- Riera, Emilio García. Historia documental del cine mexicano: 1949-1950. Universidad de Guadalajara, 1992
