= You Shall Not Covet Thy Son's Wife =

1950 film

- Directed by: Ismael Rodríguez
- Written by: Rogelio A. González; Ismael Rodríguez
- Produced by: Manuel R. Ojeda
- Starring: Fernando Soler; Pedro Infante; Andrés Soler; Carmen Molina
- Cinematography: Jack Draper
- Edited by: Fernando Martínez
- Music by: Manuel Esperón; Raúl Lavista
- Production company: Producciones Rodríguez Hermanos
- Distributed by: Clasa-Mohme
- Release date: 18 May 1950
- Running time: 113 minutes
- Country: Mexico
- Language: Spanish

You Shall Not Covet Thy Son's Wife (Spanish: No desearás la mujer de tu hijo) is a 1950 Mexican drama film directed by Ismael Rodríguez and starring Fernando Soler, Pedro Infante and Carmen Molina. It is the sequel to the 1949 film The Black Sheep. It was shot at the Tepeyac Studios in Mexico City. The film's sets were designed by the art director Carlos Toussaint. Fernando Soler won the Ariel Award for Best Actor for his performance while Andrés Soler was nominated for the Best Supporting Actor award.

== Cast ==
- Fernando Soler as Cruz Treviño Martínez de la Garza
- Pedro Infante as Silvano
- Andrés Soler as Tío Laureano
- Carmen Molina as Josefa
- Alejandro Ciangherotti as Régulo González Galindo
- Amelia Wilhelmy as Nana Agustina
- Amanda del Llano as Marielba
- Irma Dorantes as Polita
- Salvador Quiroz as Doctor

== Bibliography ==
- Heredia, Juanita. Transnational Latina Narratives in the Twenty-first Century: The Politics of Gender, Race, and Migrations. Springer, 2009.
- Mraz, John. Looking for Mexico: Modern Visual Culture and National Identity. Duke University Press, 2009.
- Riera, Emilio García. Historia documental del cine mexicano: 1949–1950. Universidad de Guadalajara, 1992
