= Francisco Jambrina =

Spanish-Mexican actor

- Born: December 3, 1902; La Rioja, Spain
- Died: January 21, 1967 (aged 64); Mexico City, Mexico
- Occupation: Actor
- Years active: 1934–1967 (film)

Francisco Jambrina Campos (December 3, 1902 – January 21, 1967) was a Spanish-born Mexican film actor.

== Selected filmography ==
- Every Madman to His Specialty (1939)
- Simón Bolívar (1942)
- Les Misérables (1943)
- Lightning in the South (1943)
- Michael Strogoff (1944)
- Twilight (1945)
- Fly Away, Young Man! (1947)
- Ecija's Seven Children (1947)
- The Secret of Juan Palomo (1947)
- The Genius (1948)
- Gangster's Kingdom (1948)
- Philip of Jesus (1949)
- The Great Madcap (1949)
- The Black Sheep (1949)
- Traces of the Past (1950)
- Women Without Tomorrow (1951)
- Good Night, My Love (1951)
- Soledad's Shawl (1952)
- The Night Falls (1952)
- Sister Alegría (1952)
- The Woman You Want (1952)
- The Three Perfect Wives (1953)
- Untouched (1954)
- The Miracle Roses (1960)
- My Mother Is Guilty (1960)

== Bibliography ==
- Pancho Kohner. Lupita Tovar The Sweetheart of Mexico. Xlibris Corporation, 2011.
