= The Secret of Juan Palomo =

1947 film

- Directed by: Miguel Morayta
- Written by: Manuel Fernández y González (novel); Miguel Morayta; Faustino Nadal Silva; Rafael M. Saavedra
- Produced by: Francisco Ortiz Monasterio
- Starring: Julián Soler; Rosario Granados; Luis Beristáin
- Cinematography: Jorge Stahl Jr.
- Music by: Luis Hernández Bretón
- Production company: Producciones México
- Distributed by: CIFESA (Spain)
- Release date: 4 December 1947
- Running time: 90 minutes
- Country: Mexico
- Language: Spanish

The Secret of Juan Palomo (Spanish: El secreto de Juan Palomo) is a 1947 Mexican historical drama film directed by Miguel Morayta and starring Julián Soler, Rosario Granados and Luis Beristáin. The film's sets were designed by the art director Javier Torres Torija. It received two Ariel Awards nominations. It was a sequel to the film Ecija's Seven Children.

== Cast ==
- Julián Soler
- Rosario Granados
- Pepita Meliá
- Luis Beristáin
- Rafael Banquells
- Florencio Castelló
- Roberto Banquells
- Roberto Cobo
- Roberto Corell
- Rafael María de Labra
- María Douglas
- Haydee Gracia
- Francisco Jambrina
- Jorge Mondragón
- Anita Muriel
- Nicolás Rodríguez
- Hernán Vera
- Carlos Villarías

== Bibliography ==
- Carredano, Consuelo & Picún, Olga. Huellas y rostros: exilios y migraciones en la construcción de la memoria musical de Latinoamérica. Universidad Nacional Autónoma de México, 2017
- Riera, Emilio García. Historia documental del cine mexicano: 1945. Ediciones Era, 1969.
