= Miguel Morayta =

Spanish film director

- Born: 15 August 1907; Villahermosa, Ciudad Real, Castilla-La Mancha, Spain
- Died: 19 June 2013 (aged 105); Mexico City, Mexico
- Occupations: Film director, screenwriter
- Years active: 1944-1978

Miguel Morayta (15 August 1907 – 19 June 2013) was a Spanish film director and screenwriter. He directed 74 films between 1944 and 1978. At the outbreak of the Spanish Civil War, Morayta was a Spanish artillery officer, who joined the Republican side. After Francisco Franco's victory, he left Spain for France and Africa, finally arriving in Mexico in 1941, where he started his career. He was living in Mexico when he died aged 105.

== Selected filmography ==
- The Stronger Sex (1946)
- Ecija's Seven Children (1947)
- The Secret of Juan Palomo (1947)
- Lost Love (1951)
- Road of Hell (1951)
- The Martyr of Calvary (1952)
- Tropical Delirium (1952)
- Pain (1953)
- Amor se dice cantando (1959)
- The Bloody Vampire (1962)
- La invasión de los vampiros (1963)
- Doctor Satán (1966)
- The Partisan of Villa (1967)
- La Bataille de San Sebastian (1968)
