= My Mother Is Guilty =

1960 film by Julián Soler

- Directed by: Julián Soler
- Written by: Julio Alejandro
- Produced by: Salvador Elizondo
- Starring: Marga López; Carlos Baena; Domingo Soler
- Cinematography: Alex Phillips
- Edited by: Rafael Ceballos
- Music by: Rosalío Ramírez
- Production company: Cinematográfica Filmex
- Release date: 14 April 1960
- Running time: 90 minutes
- Country: Mexico
- Language: Spanish

My Mother Is Guilty (Spanish: Mi madre es culpable) is a 1960 Mexican drama film directed by Julián Soler and starring Marga López, Carlos Baena and Domingo Soler.

The film's sets were designed by Jesús Bracho, who was the younger brother of Mexican film director Julio Bracho.

== Cast ==
- Marga López as Consuelo Moreno de Manterola
- Carlos Baena as Javier Manterola
- Domingo Soler as Ángel Guzmán
- Miguel Ángel Ferriz as Padre Roberto Romero
- Luis Beristáin as Luis Alcazar
- Francisco Jambrina as Arturo González
- Guillermo Orea as Álvaro de la Fuente
- Dolores Camarillo as Carmen, sirvienta
- Antonio Raxel as Doctor Alberto Amador
- Herbert Wallace as Carlitos
- Beatriz Aguirre as Lucía Arellano
- Luis Spota as Locutor
- Miguel Arenas as Rabino Mauricio Rosenthal
- Daniel Arroyo as Profesor de la Facultad
- Antonio Bravo as Dr. Ramos
- Sara Cabrera as Custodia carcel
- Jorge Casanova as Doctor
- Enrique García Álvarez as Profesor de la facultad
- Pepita González as Carcelera
- Jesús Gómez
- Carlos Hennings as Empleado en hospital
- Regino Herrera as Hombre en derrumbe
- Velia Lupercio as Espectadora estudio
- José Antonio Marros as Espectador estudio
- Magda Monzón as Espectadora en estudio
- Silvia Suárez as Espectadora en silla de ruedas
- Armando Velasco as Sacerdote

== Bibliography ==
- Emilio García Riera. Historia documental del cine mexicano: 1959–1960. Universidad de Guadalajara, 1994.
