= The Plebeian =

1953 film by Miguel M. Delgado

- Directed by: Miguel M. Delgado
- Written by: Eduardo Galindo; Ramón Pérez Peláez
- Produced by: Jesús Galindo
- Starring: Rosario Granados
- Cinematography: Jorge Stahl Jr.
- Edited by: Jorge Busto
- Music by: Manuel Esperón
- Release date: 12 February 1953
- Running time: 90 minutes
- Country: Mexico
- Language: Spanish

The Plebeian (Spanish: El plebeyo) is a 1953 Mexican drama film directed by Miguel M. Delgado and starring Rosita Arenas, Raúl Martínez and Chula Prieto.

== Cast ==
- Rosita Arenas as Virginia
- Raúl Martínez as Luis Enrique
- Chula Prieto as La güera
- José Baviera as Don Ricardo
- Wolf Ruvinskis as Lobo
- Alfredo Varela Jr. as Trompo
- Luis Beristáin as Juan
- Mimí Derba as Madre de Luis Enrique
- Beatriz Saavedra as Lupe
- Carlos Riquelme as Ingeniero Corrales
- Mario García 'Harapos' as Minero
- José Cháve as Minero
- Gregorio Acosta as Minero
- Stephen Berne as Invitado a fiesta
- Lupe Carriles
- José Luis Fernández as Minero
- Rogelio Fernández as Minero
- Isabel Herrera as Esposa de minero
- Regino Herrera as Minero
- Cecilia Leger as Esposa de minero
- Margarito Luna as Minero
- José Muñor as Doctor
- Lucrecia Muñoz as Sirvienta
- Rubén Márquez as Minero
- Antonio Raxel as Minero

== Bibliography ==
- María Luisa Amador. Cartelera cinematográfica, 1950-1959. UNAM, 1985.
