= Jorge Stahl Jr. =

Mexican cinematographer (1921–2003)

- Born: 7 July 1921; Mexico City, Mexico
- Died: 24 November 2003 (aged 82); Mexico City, Mexico
- Occupation: Cinematographer
- Years active: 1940–1990 (film)

Jorge Stahl Jr. (7 July 1921 – 24 November 2003) was a Mexican cinematographer. Active for several decades, he began his career in the Golden Age of Mexican Cinema.

== Selected filmography ==
- Song of Mexico (1945)
- Adam, Eve and the Devil (1945)
- The Golden Boat (1947)
- I Am a Charro of Rancho Grande (1947)
- Ecija's Seven Children (1947)
- The Secret of Juan Palomo (1947)
- Aunt Candela (1948)
- Los tres huastecos (1948)
- The Fallen Angel (1949)
- By the False Door (1950)
- Ritmos del Caribe (1950)
- The Mark of the Skunk (1950)
- The Man Without a Face (1950)
- Crime and Punishment (1951)
- Among Lawyers I See You (1951)
- Tenement House (1951)
- Corazón de fiera (1951)
- El revoltoso (1951)
- Paco the Elegant (1952)
- Carne de presidio (1952)
- Viajera (1952)
- The Three Happy Compadres (1952)
- The Martyr of Calvary (1952)
- Las locuras de Tin-Tan (1952)
- Cradle Song (1953)
- The Last Round (1953)
- Caribbean (1953)
- When You Come Back to Me (1953)
- The Plebeian (1953)
- What Can Not Be Forgiven (1953)
- Here Come the Freeloaders (1953)
- Garden of Evil (1954)
- Spring in the Heart (1956)
- A Woman's Devotion (1956)
- Comanche (1956)
- Escuela para suegras (1958)
- Enchanted Island (1958)
- Rebel Without a House (1960)
- Qué hombre tan sin embargo (1967)
- Pancho Tequila (1970)
- The Garden of Aunt Isabel (1971)
- Tívoli (1974)
- Conserje en condominio (1974)
- Letters from Marusia (1975)
- El ministro y yo (1976)
- La viuda negra (1977)

== Bibliography ==
- Gómez, Antonio, Ross, Julian, Hernández Adrián, Francisco-J. & Nagib, Lúcia (ed.) The Film Archipelago: Islands in Latin American Cinema. Bloomsbury Publishing, 2022.
- Reyes, Luis I. Made in Mexico: Hollywood South of the Border. Rowman & Littlefield, 2024.
