= Dracula (1931 Spanish-language film) =

1931 American horror film

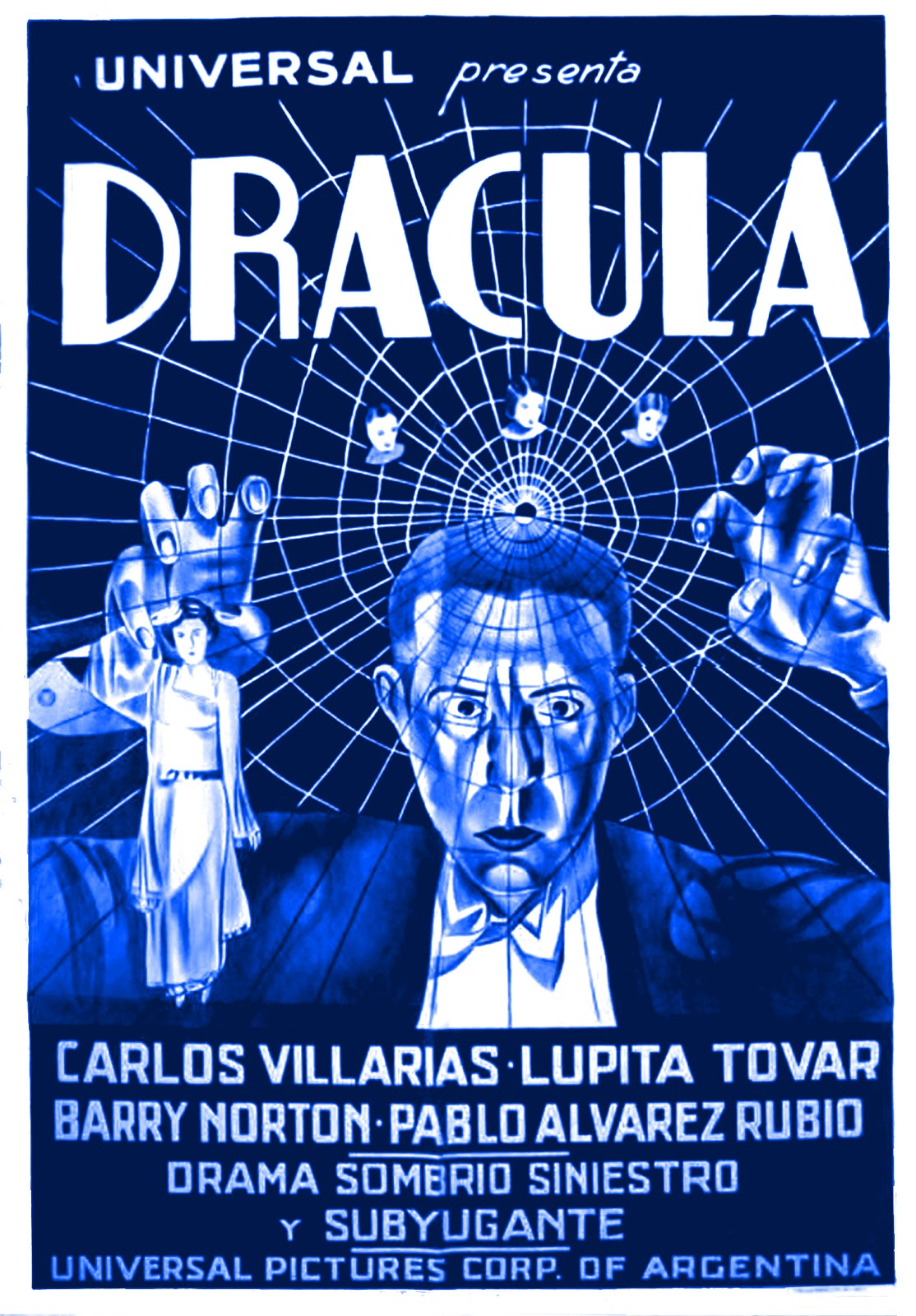
- Theatrical release poster
- Directed by: George Melford
- Screenplay by: Garrett Fort
- Spanish adaptation by: Baltasar Fernández Cué
- Based on: Dracula 1897 novel by Bram Stoker; Dracula 1924 play by Hamilton Deane and John L. Balderston
- Produced by: Carl Laemmle Jr.
- Starring: Carlos Villarías; Lupita Tovar; Barry Norton; Pablo Alvarez Rubio
- Cinematography: George Robinson
- Edited by: Arturo Tavares
- Production company: Universal Pictures Corp.
- Distributed by: Universal Pictures Corp.
- Release dates: March 1, 1931 (Havana); April 24, 1931 (New York)
- Running time: 104 minutes
- Country: United States
- Language: Spanish

Dracula is a 1931 Spanish-language American horror film directed by George Melford. The film is based on both the novel Dracula by Bram Stoker and its 1924 play adaptation by Hamilton Deane and John L. Balderston. It follows the eponymous vampire Conde Drácula as he travels from Transylvania to England to prey upon new victims. The film stars Carlos Villarías as Drácula, alongside Barry Norton, Pablo Alvarez Rubio, and Eduardo Arozamena.

Dracula was made as part of Hollywood studios' attempts to make films for foreign-language audiences. By 1930, Universal had focused primarily on developing Spanish-language films for the foreign market. Filming began on October 10, 1930, where it was shot on the same sets as Tod Browning's production of Dracula. Director Melford regularly watched daily filming from Browning's production, and applied what he saw to film his own version.

The film was released in Cuba in 1931 and for a long time was forgotten, only mentioned briefly by some horror film historians in the 1960s and 1970s. It received greater attention after a print for the film was found in New Jersey. A screening at the Museum of Modern Art in August 1977 led to a popular home video release on VHS in 1992. Critical reception to this film often compared the two versions of Dracula with some critics weighing the pros and cons of both based on the explicitness of the Spanish version with its costumes and scenes, the film's length, and the performance of Carlos Villarías as Count Dracula. In 2015, Dracula (Spanish version) was selected for preservation in the United States National Film Registry by the Library of Congress as being "culturally, historically, or aesthetically significant".

== Plot ==
Renfield, an English solicitor, makes a journey into Transylvania via stagecoach. He mentions his destination, Castle Dracula, to the locals who react with alarm. They tell him Drácula is a vampire and when he does not believe them, one insists he wear a cross. When he arrives at the Castle, the Count bids him welcome. After drinking drugged wine, Renfield collapses, still wearing the cross, and is bitten. Aboard ship, a now-enslaved Renfield laughs maniacally below as Drácula picks off the crew one by one. When the ship reaches England, he is the only living person found.

Drácula meets Dr. Seward and his family at the opera. Lucía is completely fascinated by him and that night becomes his victim. Professor Van Helsing is called in, and he recognizes the danger for what it is. He also realizes that Dr. Seward's patient Renfield is somehow tied up in events. But soon after meeting the Doctor's new neighbor, Van Helsing figures out that Drácula is a vampire—based on the fact that Drácula casts no reflection in the mirror. By now, Seward's daughter Eva is falling under his spell. To her horror, she feels increasingly weak and also increasingly wild—at one point attacking her fiancé Juan. With Seward's and Harker's help, Van Helsing seeks to trap Drácula, who outwits them and escapes with Eva by seizing control of a nurse's mind. They follow Renfield into Carfax Abbey—an act which ends with Drácula killing his slave by strangulation, and then tossing him from a tall staircase. Deep in the catacombs under Carfax, they find Drácula asleep and Eva still alive. Van Helsing drives a stake through the vampire's heart, and as Eva and Harker leave, Van Helsing prays over Renfield's body.

== Cast ==
Cast adapted from the opening credits.

- Carlos Villarías as Conde Drácula (Credited as Carlos Villar)
- Lupita Tovar as Eva Seward
- Barry Norton as Juan Harker
- Pablo Alvarez Rubio as Renfield
- Eduardo Arozamena as Van Helsing
- José Soriano Viosca as Doctor Seward
- Carmen Guerrero as Lucía
- Amelia Senisterra as Marta
- Manuel Arbó as Martín

== Production ==
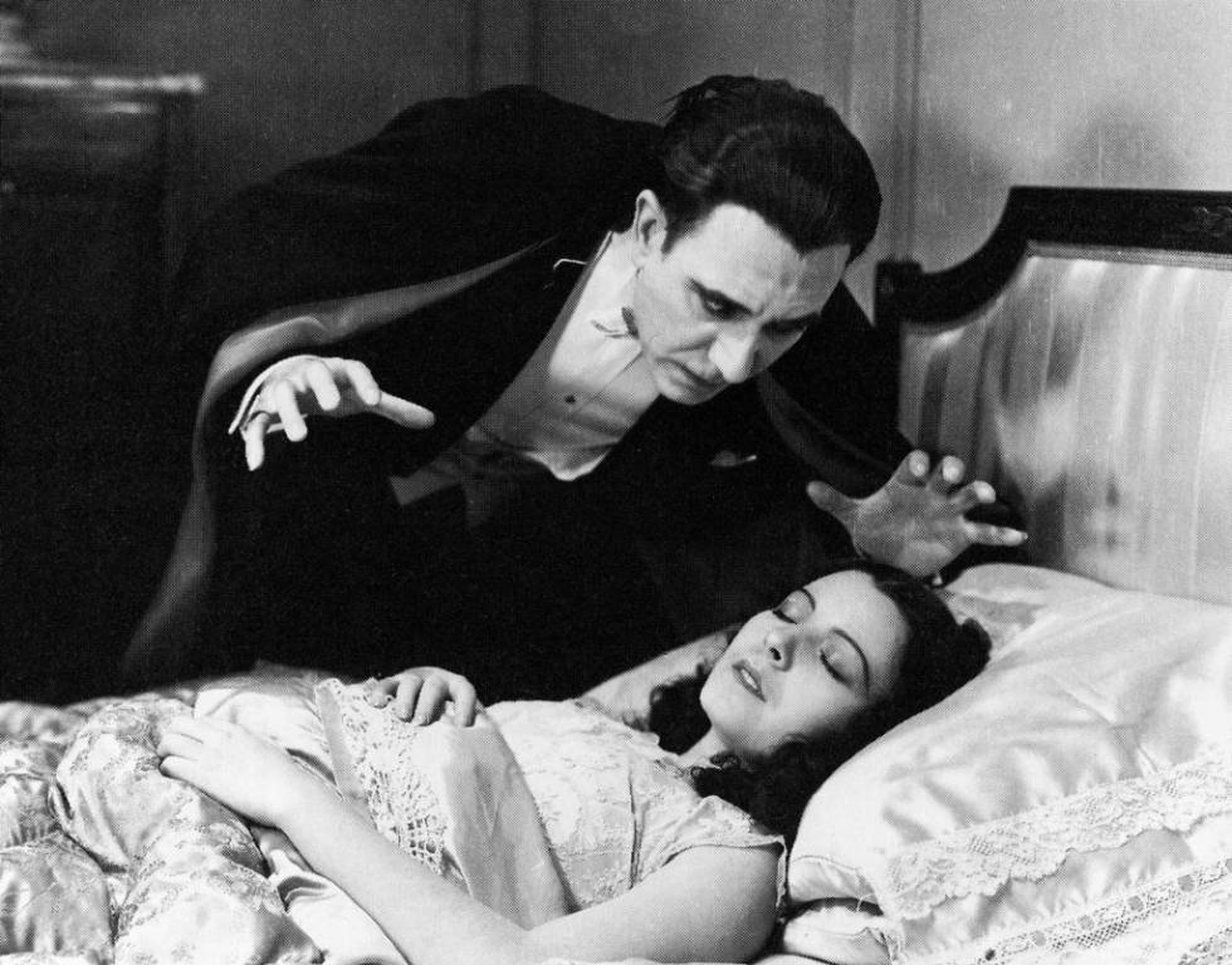
Lupita Tovar and Carlos Villarías in the film.

In the late 1920s, Hollywood studios depended on the successful exportation of their films to other countries. While silent films could easily be sold to other countries, sound film could not. By 1928, the preferred approach to the foreign-language market was to develop more than one version of a film using the same script, sets and costumes of the English-language original, but employing different actors who could speak the languages such as French, Spanish or German. In an April 30 issue of the Hollywood Filmograph, it was declared that Spanish-language films were "all the go and producers [were] spending millions of dollars on them". In February 1930, Universal announced that Paul Kohner would supervise numerous foreign-language productions, including several shot in Spanish. That September, Universal focused primarily on making Spanish-language versions of films for the potential market.

A Spanish-language version of Dracula was announced on October 1, 1930, with George Melford hired to direct, with actors Lupita Tovar and Carlos Villarías. Melford was a former actor who had made several directorial credits including the Rudolph Valentino film The Sheik (1921). After several years with Paramount, he began working at Universal often handling the directorial duties on Spanish version of studio films. These included the Spanish-language version of The Cat Creeps. Although Carl Laemmle Jr. is credited as the producer, the hand-on supervisor was 27-year-old Paul Kohner. The screenplay, which was adapted by Baltasar Fernández Cué from the English-language version by Garrett Fort, differs from the latter by expanding several dialogue exchanges, rearranging scenes and adding additional material with Renfield's flustered comic relief keeper, Martin.

On October 10, Melford began directing the film, shooting at night while Browning's crew would shoot during the day. At certain times, the crews would shoot on the same set. Filming lasted a total of 22 shooting days. Tovar discussed the Spanish-language production as to make it for "as little money as possible. They used the same sets and everything. And those [Spanish-speaking actors] were not demanding big salaries". Melford spoke no Spanish, but used an interpreter on set to direct the film. Melford studied the English-language footage filmed during the day and composed his own shots accordingly.

The film differs from Tod Browning's Dracula, as it has a running time of 104 minutes, making it almost half-hour longer than Browning's version. Costumes in this film are also somewhat different, such as actress Lupita Tovar's more low-cut nightgowns.

== Release ==
Dracula opened in Havana, Cuba on March 11, 1931, New York on April 24, and in Los Angeles on May 8. It was released in Spain in 1931. The film was distributed by the Universal Pictures Corp. On its screening in Los Angeles at the California Theatre, the theatre reported a box-office take of $5,600 for the film, which was less than the previous week's film, Paramount's Gente Alegre which grossed $6,600. By October 1930, The Hollywood Reporter described that foreign-language versions of films had been financial flops in every country, which led to studios dubbing pictures films to reach non-English speaking markets. Melford's Dracula was among the last of these multi-lingual types of productions.

The film was described by Rhodes as "largely forgotten" with only a few horror film historians mentioning it in the 1960s and 1970s. A copy of Dracula was discovered in a New Jersey warehouse in the 1970s, leading to a renewed interest towards the film following a screening of the film in New York sponsored by the Museum of Modern Art in August 1977. The print screened was incomplete, but sparked interest due to it being a largely unseen Universal horror film. A full print was found at the Cinemateca de Cuba in Havana leading to several meetings to convince the archive to allow their copy of the film to be lent out for restoration.

In October 1992, Universal released a restoration of this version of Dracula on VHS. Early home video copies of the film sold beyond the expectations of the Universal in the early 1990s. The film was released on DVD in 1999 and again in 2004 as part of the 2004 "Complete Legacy Edition". In 2012, Universal mounted a major restoration of both Browning's and Melford's Dracula for the Blu-ray release. In 2015, the Library of Congress selected the film for preservation in the National Film Registry, finding it "culturally, historically, or aesthetically significant".

== Reception ==
Among contemporary reviews, an anonymous reviewer in the Los Angeles Times commented that the film was "replete with the same thrills that characterized the original stage play" and that Count Dracula was "excellently portrayed by Carlos Villarias". The review noted that George Melford's direction was "unusually good, except for some parts, which tend to be slightly episodic in form. This has been offset by the splendid dialogue of B. Fernandez Cue, who has been responsible for not a few of the better adaptations".

The first major analysis of Dracula was by William K. Everson in his book More Classics of the Horror Film (1986). Everson proclaimed that the film made better use of sets like Dracula's Chambers than Browning's version and other events in the film such as the mist that appears out of Dracula's coffin and the sequence involving Dracula's travel to England. Everson also noted the "surprisingly erotic" qualities of the leading actress Lupita Tovar. David J. Skal's book Hollywood Gothic (1990) which included footage taken from a print of the film archived at the Cinemateca de Cuba, including footage missing from the Library of Congress copy that was screened in 1977. Skal concluded that the film was superior to Browning's film. Variety reviewed the video on its VHS release, commenting that Melford's film was "far less ambitious", noting fewer dolly and tracking shots. The review also commented that Melford's film felt more stage bound and its longer running time led to more "ponderous pauses and plodding dialog". Tom Weaver reviewed the film in Fangoria cautioning viewers on stating which film is better, proposing that "is it actually a better film than Lugosi's, or will it just seem better until the novelty wears off?"

The authors of the book Universal Horrors declared that "notwithstanding the discovery of a print of the director Rupert Julian's version of The Cat Creeps (1930), the Spanish version of "Dracula is the last great Universal horror discovery we're likely to see". While praising the faster pace of certain scenes, the authors found that some scenes were "disruptive to the film's sense of setting". The review also commented that Villaria's performance of Dracula was "the picture's most crucial weakness" and that "the performance underscores how much a personality piece the property is; like Sherlock Holmes, all his stage or movie renditions risk utter failure by its central casting" and that "Lugosi could convince anyone he was the King of the Vampires by simply striking a pose. For all of Villarias' mugging and facial gyrations, he looks like one of the count's foot soldiers". Mark Deming of AllMovie commented that "Melford's compositions and camera movements give his version a more fluid grace and subtly sinister mood, and, if his film's pace is a bit slower, the result has an effectively eerie undercurrent that Browning's sometimes lacks". Deming found that "most of the cast is just as good as, if not better than, their English-speaking counterparts" specifically noting Carmen Guerrero as Lucia (Lucy) and Lupita Tovar as Eva (Mina), Eduardo Arozamena as Van Helsing, and Pablo Alvarez Rubio as Renfield. Deming also found that "the Spanish-language Dracula (1931) suffers only when one compares Carlos Villarías' performance as Dracula to Bela Lugosi's; while Villarias is adequate, then as now, Lugosi owns the role". Paul Lenti of Variety also praised the female cast while finding that Villarias "lacks Lugosi's moth-to-the-flame allure and presence, his melodramatic pauses are almost comic".

A television series titled Y llegaron de noche (transl. And they arrived at night) for Vix+ was announced in 2022. The series is a comedic telling of the making of the film and features Eugenio Derbez in the role of Carlos Villarías and debuted in October 2024.

== Works cited ==
- Barnes, Mike (December 16, 2015). "'Ghostbusters', 'Top Gun', 'Shawshank' Enter National Film Registry". The Hollywood Reporter. Archived from the original on March 9, 2016.
- Browning, John Edgar; Picart, Caroline Joan (Kay) (2011). Dracula in Visual Media. McFarland & Company. ISBN 978-0-7864-3365-0.
- Del Barco, Mandalit (September 19, 2022). "Spanish Dracula Finds New Blood, More Than 90 Years After its Release". NPR. Archived from the original on September 19, 2022.
- Deming, Mark. "Dracula [Spanish Version]". AllMovie. Archived from the original on February 6, 2010.
- Esparza, Kike (September 20, 2024). "Eugenio Derbez se transforma en "Drácula" con "Y llegaron de noche"" [Eugenio Derbez transforms himself into "Dracula" with "Y llegaron de noche".]. El Informador (in Mexican Spanish). Jalisco, México. Archived from the original on September 20, 2024.
- Garvin, Glenn (October 27, 2015). "The Secret Story Behind the Other 'Dracula' and the Lead Actress Who Just Died at 106". Miami Herald. Archived from the original on October 29, 2015.
- Reyes, Xavier Aldana (2024). "Introduction: Vampires in Spain". In Bacon, Simon (ed.). The Palgrave Handbook of the Vampire. Palgrave Macmillan. ISBN 978-3-031-36252-1.
- Rhodes, Gary D. (2014). Tod Browning's Dracula. Tomahawk Press. ISBN 978-0-9566834-5-8.
- Weaver, Tom; Brunas, Michael; Brunas, John (2007) [1990]. Universal Horrors (2 ed.). McFarland & Company. ISBN 978-0-7864-2974-5.
- "Drácula (1931)". American Film Institute. Archived from the original on February 8, 2021.
- "Complete National Film Registry Listing". Library of Congress. Archived from the original on March 5, 2016.
- "2015 National Film Registry: "Ghostbusters" Gets the Call". Library of Congress. Archived from the original on November 7, 2017.
- ""Dracula" in Spanish Opens at California". The Los Angeles Times. May 11, 1931. Archived from the original on September 25, 2021 – via Newspapers.com.
- "Dracula (1931) Spanish Version". Dracula (Blu-ray). Universal Pictures. 2014. Event occurs at 00:00:32. 61163250.
