= Carmen Molina (actress) =

Mexican actress, singer and dancer

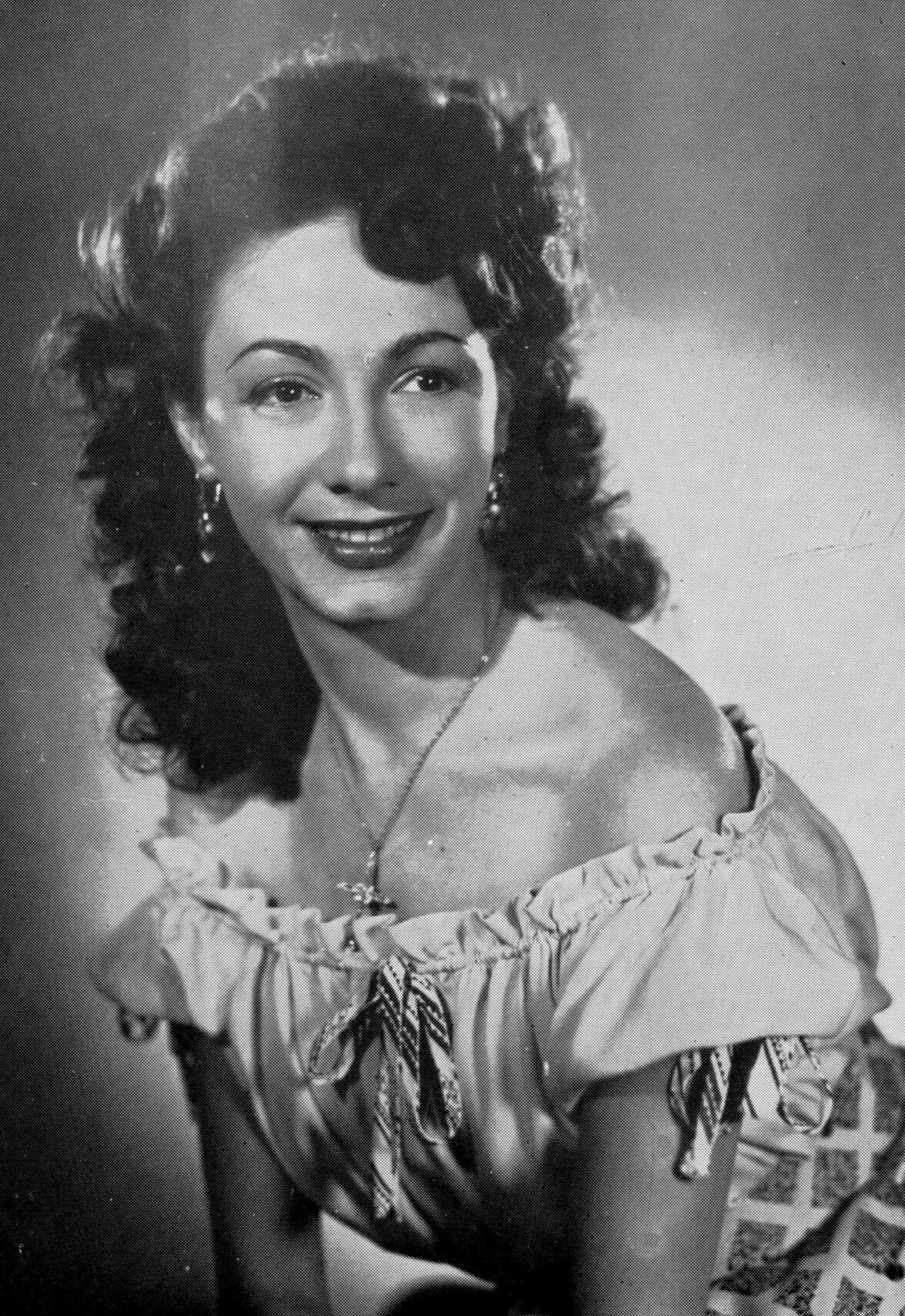
- Molina in 1954
- Born: 20 January 1920; Mexico City, Mexico
- Died: 17 October 1998 (aged 78); Mexico City, Mexico
- Occupations: Actor singer dancer
- Years active: 1936–1985

Carmen Molina (20 January 1920 – 17 October 1998) was a Mexican actress, singer, and dancer. She was considered a popular star of the Golden Age of Mexican cinema. Throughout her acting career, she was nominated for an Ariel Award for her supporting role in Las mañanitas (1948).

== Biography and career ==
Carmen Molina was born in Mexico City in 1920. She studied at the Nuestra Señora de los Ángeles school and made her film debut at the age of 16 with a small role in the movie ¿Qué hago con la criatura? (1936). Her subsequent projects would see her working with actors such as Cantinflas, Emilio Fernández, Sara García, Gloria Marin, Julián Soler, and Pedro Armendáriz in films such as No te engañes corazón (1937), Adiós Nicanor (1937), La gallina clueca (1941), and Simón Bolívar (1942). In 1944, she worked on Walt Disney's American production The Three Caballeros, a film that combined animation with live actors. The following year, she appeared in the film Song of Mexico, but despite these opportunities in Mexico, she was unable to land a leading role and had to settle for supporting roles in which she demonstrated her acting skills, as was the case with the film Las mañanitas (1948), starring the real-life couple Esther Fernández, one of the greatest divas of the previous decade, and Antonio Badú. For this performance, she received an Ariel Award nomination, losing to Columba Domínguez for her performance in Maclovia. Other important roles were in films such as Soy charro de levita (1949), starring Tin Tan and Rosita Quintana, Hipócrita (1949), alternating with Leticia Palma and Antonio Badú, Vino el remolino y nos alevantó (1950), No desearás a la mujer de tu hijo (1950), with Pedro Infante and Fernando Soler, and El hombre sin rostro (1950) with Arturo de Córdova.

Disappointed at not receiving the starring roles she felt she deserved, she took refuge in the theater and bid farewell to cinema with the film El mártir del calvario (The Martyr of Calvary, 1952). She returned ten years later, persuaded by her friend Mario Moreno Cantinflas to appear in one of his films, El extra (The Extra), and went on to make minor appearances. She enjoyed her greatest success on television, appearing in soap operas and television theater. In 1961, she was voted most outstanding actress and later best actress.

== Filmography ==
=== Film ===
| Year | Title | Role | Notes |
|---|---|---|---|
| 1936 | ¿Qué hago con la criatura? | Rosa, Juan's husband | |
| 1937 | Don't Fool Yourself Dear | Carmencita | |
| 1937 | Adiós Nicanor | Lupe | |
| 1941 | La gallina clueca | Pita | |
| 1942 | Simón Bolívar | María Teresa | |
| 1944 | Saint Francis of Assisi | Sta. Clara de Asis | |
| 1944 | The Three Caballeros | Mexican Girl | |
| 1945 | Canção do México | Specialty Dancer | |
| 1946 | Palabras de mujer | Bailarina | Uncredited |
| 1947 | Por culpa de una mujer | | |
| 1948 | The Well-paid | Julieta Rute | |
| 1948 | La casa de la Troya | Moncha | |
| 1948 | Las mañanitas | | |
| 1948 | Dueña y señora | Toña joven | |
| 1949 | Carta Brava | Nora | |
| 1949 | Rough But Respectable | Carmelita | |
| 1949 | Hypocrite | Aurora | |
| 1949 | Cuatro vidas | | |
| 1950 | Vino el remolino y nos alevantó | Toña Ramírez | |
| 1950 | You Shall Not Covet Thy Son's Wife | Josefa | |
| 1950 | The Man Without a Face | Ana María | |
| 1951 | La hija de la otra | Mercedes de Castroviejo | |
| 1952 | El mártir del calvario | Marta | |
| 1962 | Twist, locura de juventud | Tía Rita | |
| 1962 | The Extra | Actress who plays Margarita Gautier | |
| 1963 | Rostro infernal | Dr. Mendez Braun | |
| 1965 | Aventura al centro de la tierra | Julia | |
| 1969 | Amor y medias | | |
| 1979 | Naná | | |
| 1981 | Lagunilla, mi barrio | Hortensia Braniff | |
| 1982 | Lagunilla 2 | Hortensia | |
| 1983 | Los dos carnales | Doña Manuela | (final film role) |
