= Bamberg (disambiguation) =

Bamberg could refer to:

== Persons ==
- David (Fu Manchu) Bamberg (1904–1974), magician
- Carl Bamberg (1847–1892), German watchmaker
- Ernst Bamberg (1940–), German biophysicist
- Otto of Bamberg
- Theodore Tobias Bamberg (1875–1963), magician, stagename Okito

== Places ==
- Bamberg, Germany, a city in Bavaria
- Bamberg (electoral district), a federal electoral district
- Bamberg (district), a district in Bavaria, Germany surrounding, but not including the city of Bamberg
- Bamberg, Ontario, Canada
- Bamberg, South Carolina, United States
- Bamberg County, South Carolina, United States
- Bamberg (crater), a crater on Mars

== Other ==
- Bamberg Apocalypse
- Bamberg Magical Dynasty
- Brose Baskets Bamberg, a basketball club
- Psalter (Bamberg, Staatsbibliothek, MS A. I. 14)
- Archbishop of Bamberg
- Bishopric of Bamberg
- Bamberg-Refraktor, a large telescope in Berlin

== See also ==
- Bamberger
- Bamburgh
- Babergh (disambiguation)
