= Katy Jurado filmography =

Jurado with Charlton Heston in Arrowhead (1953)

This is a complete filmography of Katy Jurado. Jurado began her career in 1943. After a notable career in the Mexican films, she went to Hollywood in the late 1940s. During the 1950s and 1960s, she appeared in notable films such as High Noon (1952), Arrowhead, Broken Lance (1954), Trapeze (1956), One-Eyed Jacks, (1960), Stay Away, Joe (1968) and many others. She was the first Latin American and Mexican woman Golden Globe Award winner and Academy Award nominee. In 1992, she received the Golden Boot Award by her notable contribution to the western movies.

== Filmography ==
=== 1943 – 1949 ===
Year	Title	Role	Director	Other cast members
1943	No matarás	Susana	Chano Urueta	Carmen Montejo, Emilio Tuero, Sara García, Rafael Banquells
1943	Internado para señoritas	Student girl	Gilberto Martínez Solares	Mapy Cortés, Emilio Tuero, Prudencia Grifell
1944	La vida inútil de Pito Pérez	Soledad	Miguel Contreras Torres	Manuel Medel, Elvia Sacedo, Eduardo Arozamena
1943	Balajú	Lola	Rolando Aguilar	María Antonieta Pons, David Silva, Mario Tenorio
1944	La sombra de Chucho el Roto	Elisa	Alejandro Galindo	Tito Junco, Leopoldo Ortín, Emma Roldán
1944	The Museum of Crime	Sara Cardoso	René Cardona	David T. Bamberg, Pituka de Foronda, Emma Roldán
1944	Bartolo toca la flauta	Cleo	Miguel Contreras Torres	Manuel Medel, Esther Luquín, Eduardo Arozamena
1945	Soltera y con gemelos	Gloria	Jaime Salvador	Amanda Ledesma, José Cibrián, Ángel Garasa
1945	Guadalajara pués	Rosa	Raúl de Anda	Luis Aguilar, Joy Page, Clifford Carrr
1945	La Viuda celosa	Lucinda de Altas Torres	Fernando Cortés	Amanda Ledesma, Luis Aldás, Eva Calvo
1946	Caribbean Rose	Marga	José Benavides	María Elena Marqués, Víctor Junco, Arturo Soto Rangel
1947	El último Chinaco	Concha	Raúl de Anda	Luis Aguilar, Marga Lopez, Carlos López Moctezuma
1947	Nosotros los pobres	"La que se levanta tarde"	Ismael Rodríguez	Pedro Infante, Blanca Estela Pavón, Evita Muñoz
1948	Prisión de Sueños	Carlota	Víctor Urruchúa	Esther Fernández, Rodolfo Acosta, Roberto Cañedo
1949	Hay lugar para...dos	Kitty	Alejandro Galindo	David Silva, Fernando Soto, Olga Jiménez
1949	El Seminarista	Chayito	Roberto Rodríguez	Pedro Infante, Silvia Derbez, Arturo Soto Rangel
1949	Mujer de medianoche	The Stepmother	Víctor Urruchúa	Ernesto Alonso, Gloria Marín, Silvia Pinal

=== 1950 – 1958 ===
Year	Title	Role	Director	Other cast members
1950	El sol sale para todos	Amalia	Víctor Urruchúa	Gloria Marín, Delia Magaña, Gustavo Rojo
1950	Cabellera Blanca	"La Vampiresa"	José Díaz Morales	Fernando Fernández, Rosario Granados, Rubén Rojo
1951	Cárcel de Mujeres	Lupe	Miguel M. Delgado	Sara Montiel, Miroslava, María Douglas
1951	Bullfighter and the Lady	Chelo Estrada	Budd Boetticher	Robert Stack, Gilbert Roland, Joy Page
1952	High Noon	Helen Ramírez	Fred Zinnemann	Gary Cooper, Grace Kelly, Lloyd Bridges
1952	El Bruto	Paloma	Luis Buñuel	Pedro Armendáriz, Andrés Soler, Rosita Arenas
1953	Tehuantepec	Clara	Miguel Contreras Torres	Eduardo Fajardo, Enrique Rambal, Dan O'Herlihy
1953	The Sword of Granada	Lolita	Edward Dein	César Romero, Tito Junco, Rebeca Iturbide
1953	San Antone	Mistania Figueroa	Joseph Kane	Rod Cameron, Forrest Tucker, Rodolfo Acosta
1953	Arrowhead	Nita	Charles Marquis Warren	Charlton Heston, Jack Palance, Mary Sinclair
1954	Broken Lance	Señora Deverreaux	Edward Dmytryk	Spencer Tracy, Richard Widmark, Robert Wagner
1955	The Racers	María Chávez	Henry Hathaway	Kirk Douglas, Bella Darvi, César Romero
1955	Trial	Consuelo Chávez	Mark Robson	Glenn Ford, Dorothy McGuire, Arthur Kennedy
1956	Trapeze	Rosa	Carol Reed	Burt Lancaster, Tony Curtis, Gina Lollobrigida
1956	Man from Del Rio	Estella	Harry Horner	Anthony Quinn, Peter Whitney, Douglas Fowley
1957	Dragoon Wells Massacre	Mara Fay	Harold D. Schuster	Barry Sullivan, Dennis O'Keefe, Mona Freeman
1958	The Badlanders	Anita	Delmer Daves	Alan Ladd, Ernest Borgnine, Claire Kelly

=== 1961 – 1970 ===
Year	Title	Role	Director	Other cast members
1961	One-Eyed Jacks	María Longworth	Marlon Brando	Marlon Brando, Karl Malden, Pina Pellicer
1961	Y Dios la llamo Tierra	Marta	Carlos Toussaint	Ignacio López Tarso, David Silva, Manuel Capetillo
1961	Barabbas	Sara	Richard Fleischer	Anthony Quinn, Jack Palance, Silvana Mangano, Vittorio Gassman, Ernest Borgnine
1962	The Italian Brigands	Assunta Carbone	Mario Camerini	Vittorio Gassman, Ernest Borgnine, Rosanna Schiaffino
1963	La Bandida	"La Jarocha"	Roberto Rodríguez	María Félix, Pedro Armendáriz, Emilio Fernández
1966	Smoky	María	George Sherman	Fess Parker, Diana Hyland
1966	''High Noon: The Clock Strikes Noon Again (TV Movie)	Helen Ramirez	Robert Enders	Peter Fonda
1967	A Covenant with Death	Eulalia	Lamont Johnson	George Maharis, Laura Devon, Gene Hackman
1968	Stay Away, Joe	Annie Lightcloud	Peter Tewksbury	Elvis Presley, Burgess Meredith, Joan Blondell
1968	Any Second Now (TV Movie)	Señora Vorhis	Gene Levitt	Stewart Granger, Lois Nettleton
1968	La Puerta y La Mujer del Carnicero	Remedios	Ismael Rodríguez, Luis Alcoriza	Ignacio López Tarso, Manuel Lopez Ochoa
1969	A Man Alone	Ana	Harald Philipp	Robert Brown, Alberto Closas
1970	Faltas a la moral	Lilia	Ismael Rodríguez	Ana Martín, Alberto Vázquez, Andrés Soler

=== 1970 – 2002 ===
Year	Title	Role	Director	Other cast members
1971	The Fearmaker	Sara Verdugo	Anthony Carras	Paul Picerni, Sonia Amelio, Fernando Soler
1971	The Bridge in the Jungle	Angela, the Witch	Pancho Kohner	John Huston, Charles Robinson, Aurora Clavel
1971	A Little Game (TV Movie)	Laura	George Schaefer	Diane Baker, Ed Nelson
1971	The Boy and the Turtle (TV Movie)		Eugene Poinc	Henry Calvin, Gilbert Roland
1973	Pat Garrett & Billy The Kid	Señora Baker	Sam Peckinpah	James Coburn, Kris Kristofferson, Barry Sullivan, Bob Dylan, Emilio Fernández
1973	Fe, Esperanza y Caridad	Eulogia	Alberto Bojórquez, Luis Alcoriza, Jorge Fons	Sara García, Julio Aldama, Stella Inda
1972	Once Upon a Scoundrel	Aunt Delfina	George Schaefer	Zero Mostel, A Martinez, Rita Macedo
1975	El Elegido	Doña Paz	Servando González	Manuel Ojeda, Héctor Suárez, Patricia Reyes Spíndola
1976	Los albañiles	Josefina	Jorge Fons	Ignacio López Tarso, Salvador Sánchez, José Alonso
1976	Pantaleón y las visitadoras	"La Chuchupe"	Mario Vargas Llosa	José Sacristán, Pancho Córdova, Rosa Carmina
1978	The Recourse to the Method (El Recurso del Método)	La Mayorala	Miguel Littin	Nelson Villagra, Ernesto Gómez Cruz, Salvador Sánchez
1978	The Children of Sanchez	"Chata"	Hall Bartlett	Anthony Quinn, Dolores del Río, Lupita Ferrer, Lucía Méndez
1979	La Viuda de Montiel	Mama Grande	Miguel Littin	Geraldine Chaplin, Nelson Villagra, Ernesto Gómez Cruz
1981	La Seducción	Isabel	Arturo Ripstein	Viridiana Alatriste, Gonzalo Vega, Adriana Roel
1981	Barrio de Campeones	Leonor	Fernando Vallejo	Dionisio Rodríguez, Carlos Riquelme, Norma Lazareno
1981	D.F/Distrito Federal	La Solterona	Rogelio A. González	Julissa, Roberto Cobo, Andres García, Carmen Salinas
1981	Evita Perón (TV Movie)	Doña Juana	Marvin J. Chomsky	Faye Dunaway, Pedro Armendáriz, Jr., Rita Moreno, Jose Ferrer
1984	Under the Volcano	Señora Gregoria	John Huston	Albert Finney, Jacqueline Bisset, Emilio Fernández
1985	Lady Blue (TV Movie)	Doña Maria Theresa	Gary Nelson	Jamie Rose, Danny Aiello
1998	Divine	Mama Dorita	Arturo Ripstein	Francisco Rabal, Flor Edwarda Gurrola, Bruno Bichir
1998	The Hi-Lo Country	Meesa	Stephen Frears	Woody Harrelson, Patricia Arquette, Penélope Cruz
2002	Un secreto de Esperanza	Esperanza	Leopoldo Laborde	Imanol Landeta, Ana de la Reguera, Roberto Cobo

=== Short films appearing as herself ===
Year	Title	Notes
1960	Here's Hollywood	
1991	Grace Kelly: The American Princess	
1993	Memoria del Cine Mexicano	
1997	Un Buñuel Mexican	
2002	The Bronze Screen: 100 Years of the Latino Image in American Cinema	

=== Television ===
Year	Title	Role	Director	Other main cast members
1952	Mr. & Mrs. North; Episode : "These Latins"	Lolita Alvarez	Ralph Murphy	Barbara Britton, Richard Denning
1954	Climax! Episode : "Nightmare by Day"	Margo Nieto	John Frankenheimer	Mary Astor, Warner Anderson
1957	Playhouse 90; Episode : "Four Women in Black"	Sister Monica	Bernard Girard	Richard Joy, Helen Hayes
1959	The Rifleman; Episode : "The Boarding House"	Julia Massini	Sam Peckinpah	Chuck Connors, Johnny Crawford
1960	The Westerner; Episode : "Ghost of a Chance"'	Carlotta	Bruce Geller	Brian Keith
1962	Death Valley Days; Episode: "La Tules"	La Tules	Tay Garnett	Stanley Andrews, Rodolfo Acosta
1962	The Eleventh Hour; Episode: "Seventh Day of Creation"	Rose Ramírez	Jack Arnold	Jack Ging, Wendell Corey
1970	The Virginian under the rebranded name "The Men From Shiloh"; Episode : "The Best Man"'	Mama Fé	Russ Mayberry	Stewart Granger, Desi Arnaz
1972	Alias Smith and Jones; Episode: "The McCreede Feud"	Carlotta	Alexander Singer	Ben Murphy, Roger Davis, Cesar Romero
1977	Baretta; Episode : "Not on Our Block"	Rosa Canzone	Burt Brockenhorff	Robert Blake, Tom Ewell
1979	Tales of the Unexpected; Episode : "Man from the South"	Woman	Michael Tuchner	José Ferrer, Roald Dahl
1984	a.k.a. Pablo	Rosa Maria Rivera		Paul Rodriguez, Joe Santos, Mario Lopez, Hector Elizondo, Lupe Ontiveros
1994	Más allá del Puente	"La Jurada"	Carla Estrada	María Sorté, Angelica Aragón, Alfredo Adame
1996	Te sigo amando	Justina	Carla Estrada	Claudia Ramírez, Sergio Goyri, Luis José Santander

== Theatre ==
Year	Play	Role	Theatre	Other notable cast members
1956	Filomena Marturano	Filomena Marturano	Royal Theatre, New York City	Raf Vallone, Rino Negri
1973	The Red Devil Battery Sign		Shubert Theatre, New York City	Anthony Quinn, Claire Bloom
