= Bamberger =

Bamberger is a Bavarian and southern German toponymic surname, that indicates someone from Bamberg in Bavaria. Notable people with the surname include:

- Ana Maria Bamberger (born 1966), Romanian physician and playwright
- Ármin Vámbéry (born Bamberger) (1832–1913), Hungarian orientalist
- Bernard Jacob Bamberger (1904–1980), American rabbi and Biblical scholar
- Clarence Bamberger (1886–1984), American mining executive, politician and philanthropist
- Cyril Stanley Bamberger (1919–2008), Battle of Britain pilot
- Eugen Bamberger (1857–1932), German chemist
- Eugen von Bamberger (1858–1921), Austrian internist
- Florence E. Bamberger (1882–1965), American pedagogue
- Fritz Bamberger (painter) (1814–1873), German painter
- Fritz Bamberger (scholar) (1902–1984), German Jewish scholar
- George Bamberger (1923–2004), American baseball player
- Heinrich von Bamberger (1822–1888), Austrian pathologist
- Jakob Bamberger (1913–1989), German boxer and Porajmos survivor
- Jeanne Bamberger (1924–2024), American music educator
- Judith Bamberger, American mechanical engineer
- Lesley Bamberger (born 1965), Dutch billionaire, owner of Kroonenberg Groep
- Louis Bamberger (1855–1944), founder of the Institute for Advanced Study
  - Bamberger's, retail store that he founded
- Ludwig Bamberger (1823–1899), German politician, political economist and founder of Deutsche Bank
- Michael Bamberger (born 1960), writer
- Seligman Baer Bamberger (1807–1878), German rabbi, author and educator
- Simon Bamberger (1846–1926), American politician from Utah

Bamberger may also refer to a citizen of the German city of Bamberg or to organisations connected with that city:

- Bamberg Symphony Orchestra (Bamberger Symphoniker)

== See also ==
- Bamberg (disambiguation)
- Bambrzy
