= García brothers =

García brothers or Garcia Brothers may refer to:

- Carpa García (or the Garcia Brothers Show), a Mexican American carpa (travelling circus tent show)
- Latin Flavors, owned by the Garcia brothers
- Café Novelty, first owners were the García brothers
- The Brothers García, an American sitcom

== Music ==
- The Garcia Brothers (album), an album by Axe Murder Boyz
- The Garcia Brothers (Los Angeles band) 1990s
- Garcia Brothers, a Native American musical group in Ohkay Owingeh, New Mexico.
- Los Garcia Brothers, see 2008 – 28th Tejano Music Awards
- Mike and James Garcia, the hip-hop duo Axe Murder Boyz

== Sports ==
- the Garcia brothers, Deportivo Indiana Gladiadores U-17 Team
- Miguel Ángel García (boxer) and his brother Robert Garcia (American boxer)
- Raúl García (boxer) and his brother Ramón García Hirales
- Carlos Garcia (American soccer) and his brother Gabe Garcia (soccer)
