= The Headless Woman (1944 film) =

1944 film

- Directed by: René Cardona
- Written by: David T. Bamberg; René Cardona; Xavier Villaurrutia
- Produced by: Felipe Subervielle
- Starring: David T. Bamberg; Manuel Medel
- Cinematography: Gabriel Figueroa
- Edited by: Gloria Schoemann
- Music by: Manuel Esperón
- Production company: Films Mundiales
- Distributed by: Clasa-Mohme
- Release date: 30 March 1944
- Running time: 77 minutes
- Country: Mexico
- Language: Spanish

The Headless Woman (Spanish: La mujer sin cabeza) is a 1944 Mexican crime, horror and mystery film directed by René Cardona and starring David T. Bamberg and Manuel Medel. It is the second film in the Fu Manchu series with David T. Bamberg. The film's sets were designed by the art director Jorge Fernández.

== Cast ==
- David T. Bamberg as Fu Manchu
- Alfonso Bedoya
- Roberto Cañedo
- Cuquita Escobar
- Paco Fuentes
- Ramón G. Larrea
- Manuel Medel as Satanás
- Manuel Noriega
- Francisco Pando
- Ignacio Peón
- Carlos Riquelme
- Humberto Rodríguez
- Fernando Romero
- Ángel T. Sala
- Milisa Sierra
- Arturo Soto Rangel
- Jorge Trevino
- Jesús Valero

== Bibliography ==
- Cotter, Bob. The Mexican Masked Wrestler and Monster Filmography. McFarland & Company, 2005.

== See also ==
- Other Fu Manchu films by Cardona : El Spectro de la novia, El As negro, El Museo del crimen.
