= The Headless Woman =

The Headless Woman can refer to:

- The Headless Woman (1944 film), a 1944 Mexican film
- The Headless Woman (1947 film), a 1947 Argentine film
- The Headless Woman (2008 film), a 2008 Argentine film
