= Heinrich Bamberger =

Heinrich Bamberger may refer to:

- Heinrich von Bamberger (1822–1888), Austrian pathologist
- Henri Bamberger (born Heinrich Bamberger, 1826–1908), banker, member of the Bischoffsheim family
