= Yarabí Ávila Gonzalez =

Yarabí Ávila González (Judía)

Rector of UMSNH
- Incumbent
- Assumed office 2023
- Succeeded by: Gabriela Molina Aguilar

Secretary of Education of Michoacan
- In office October 2021 – November 2022

Personal details
- Party: PRI (until 2021); Unaffiliated (since 2021)

Yarabi Avila Gonzalez is a Mexican politician who served as the Secretary of Education for Michoacán from 2021 to 2022, and the President of the Red Juntos for Michoacan directive since 2023.

== Biography ==
Ávila Gonzalez speaks English and French. She learned English through a teacher training course at Universidad Michoacana de San Nicolás de Hidalgo (USMNH), and French through USMNH in 2002. She received a masters in education from the University of Baja California in 2013 and a masters in management from the University of Barcelona in 2009.

In 2014, she held several positions in the Michoacan state government and at USMNH, serving as comptroller for the university, the secretary of social policy for Michoacan, and the undersecretariat for administration for Michoacan. From 2015 to 2018, she was a deputy in the mayoral District X of northeast Morelia. From 2018 to 2021, Gonzalez served as a local deputy in the Michoacan legislature. Her political party was PRI until 2021, leaving the party immediately after becoming nominated for Secretary of Education.

From October 2021 to November 2022, Ávila Gonzalez served as the Secretary of Education for Michoacan. While secretary, she held anti-LGBT views and was subject to aletter demanding her resignation by various Michoacana feminist groups and activists. She resigned to become the rector of USMNH. In 2023, she was nominated and appointed president of the educational group Red Juntos for Michoacan.
