= Carpa =

Traveling theater

In Mexico and the Southwestern United States, the carpa (Spanish: "tent", from the Quechua karpa) theater flourished during the 1920s and 1930s. Like its American counterpart vaudeville, performance materials were varied, including comedic sketches, puppet shows, political satire, acrobatics, and dance.

Its name comes from the removable canvas-roofed structure, like that of circuses, used for the theaters' traveling tours through towns and cities. Unlike classic circuses, they offered very simple theater performances without elaborate scenery that were humorous or satirical, often musical, and close to the genre of popular magazines. They emerged in the Mexican capital and then in other cities of the country, replacing the "theater of the rich," whose functions had little or nothing to do with the plain people and whose prices were out of reach of their money.

Some well-known carpas include Carpa Valentina and Carpa Azcapotzalco. In the United States, Carpa Cubana, Carpa Monsavias, and La Carpa García were the best-known.

In order to be successful on the carpa stage, an actor had to establish an immediate rapport with the audience and get laughs quickly or risk being booed off stage. This limited the portrayals to stock characters. However, many who allowed their personalities to shine through the characters and who developed a knack for improvisation later found success in the cinema of Mexico, helping to create its Golden Age.

== Origin and development ==
Scholars derive the roots of the carpa from the medieval Mester de Juglaría or in the Mystery plays imported by the Spanish missions. The carpa emerged from seasonal theaters of the 1870s that performed Don Juan Tenorio for the Day of the Dead (November 1) and finished with religious plays for Christmas. This type of show was reserved for the privileged classes. This practice continued during the regime of Porfirio Díaz and the Mexican Revolution.

Following the Revolution, companies set up large carpas in Tacuba, Tacubaya, and Azcapotzalco, and some, like the Nacho Pérez carpa, toured the country. The theaters were permitted by the authorities as it kept the population distracted from the political, economic and social events that the country was experiencing. These temporary theatres allowed Mexico's urban underclass to forget their daily troubles and were encouraged by the government as an alternative to pulque halls and brothels.

Most carpa, especially at the beginning, mainly presented comedians, dancers and singers, sometimes magicians or conjurers and jugglers or ventriloquists. Generally, the performances consisted of three "tandas": the first included audiences of all ages, including children, and presented artists who were less known or attracted smaller audiences; in the second tanda, the quality of the show increased. The third, after 8 p.m., had the featured acts — from this emerged such well-known characters as Cantinflas and Manuel Medel, Manuel Medel, and later performers such as Resortes and Clavillazo.

== Boom period ==
The carpa were itinerant and performed the same day that it arrived in a town. This made the public identify more with the actors, since it was a closer coexistence: the inhabitants of the towns saw the performers in the process of setting up their tents. The carpas were economical, since the show was presented on a wooden stage and the chairs were arranged, they used tarpaulins or wooden boards to improvise the dressing rooms, but the public was quite demanding with the quality of the performances.

As the carpas boomed, they began to rent premises to perform. These premises were located mostly in Mexico City, where there were already established theaters, but the boom of the carpas and the tandas was so great that one was presented at the Palace of Fine Arts, with the staging of "Rayando el sol" by Roberto Soto, "El Panzón Soto", a marquee comedian known for his satire.

== Features ==
The show began with the arrival in a neighborhood or on a street of a truck that unloaded a modest tent with a dirt floor that could accommodate 100 spectators, and with no dressing rooms other than the lower part of a 6 by 8-meter parquet. There were also larger tents with capacity for 200 people and probably better dressing rooms, and with patched and powdered costumes like that of the medieval bank robbers, or perhaps feathers and sequins in better condition, and always with performers of all qualities: from beginners for the first and second tandas and experienced and talented artists for the third. Planks provided improvised benches where the public would sit (folding chairs, made of wood first, and sheet metal later, were provided later in the era).

== Social impact ==
Curiosity made townspeople stop to see how a modest place for shows was being put together... that instant was taken advantage of by the herald to announce the artists who would present in each of the tandas. Putting together the enclosure, the "gritones" (screams) begin to call the public to the event that will last part of the afternoon until they enter the night, extolling the artists and musicians. Those who attended the performances had the opportunity to meet the artists, singers, and comedians who the public heard on the radio, as well as stars who delighted with their dances and colorful costumes of sequins and feathers. The public, mostly workers and employees, but also journalists and art critics, arrived with the expectation of seeing musical numbers, current themes of political criticism expressed by characters from the neighborhood: Politicians and "catrines" were, mainly, the targets of the jokes and attacks of the neighborhood characters represented in the "little hair", the drunkard, the quarrelsome or the rogue, making them stand above those of the "upper class" by ridiculing them based on high-sounding words or incoherent speeches that left them perplexed and provoked the laughter of the public.

The realization of the desires for a dignified life and for social justice took shape in the carpa, long before in the social and political analyses of the period before the Revolution, but also during it and in the later stage; and the criticism that the Carpa embodied disappeared only because of the mediatization of television and the censorship that the governments applied to it.

== Plays ==
In addition to "carpas" with comic, musical and variety shows, there were some specializing in plays, such as el Tayita by the Padilla Brothers, where the actress Blanquita Morones made her debut, and which toured much of the national territory. One of the places that this el Tayita theater was most successful was in the port of Acapulco, where the famous comedian and magician El "Pipochas" worked in his intermissions, other of the people who worked at that time in the plays were Mr. "Jorge Lavat" and a child from the port of Acapulco, who in the intermissions towards imitations with singing phonomimics of artists such as "Sandro" and "Raphael" that child is called "David Pérez Vargas" and even work in a play next to a member of the "Padilla" family back in the years 70's this carpa was installed in the heart of the port, the place known today as "The Crafts Market" of the parasal.

One of the most remembered stagings was "Crown of Tears," a famous radio soap opera with Prudencia Griffel and which was later taken to the movies and television in soap opera format.

== Stock characters ==
- The Indian
- The pelado
- The shrew
- The corrupt policeman
- The bourgeois
- The dandy
