= Edmund von Neusser =

Austrian internist

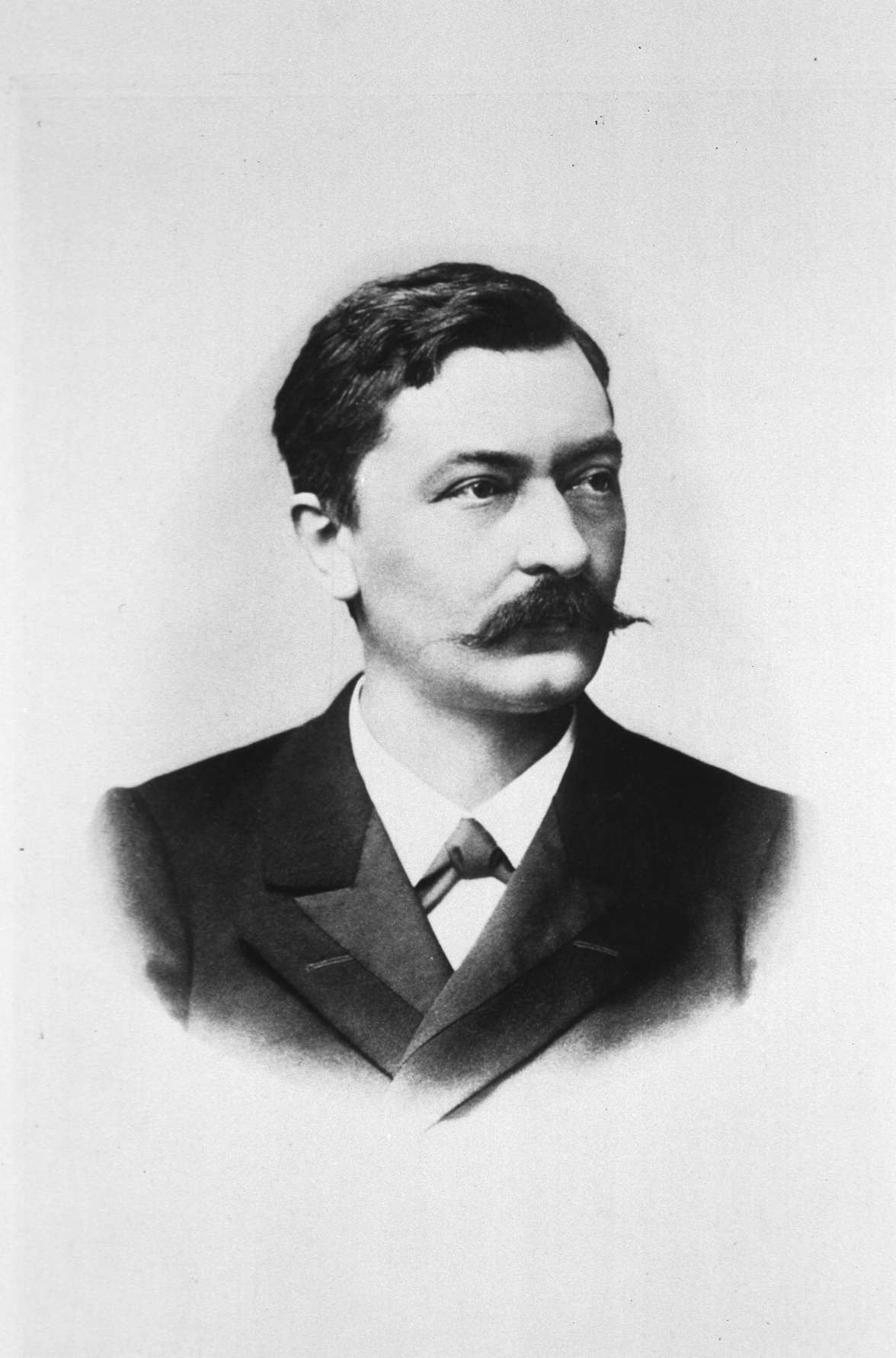
Edmund von Neusser (1852-1912)

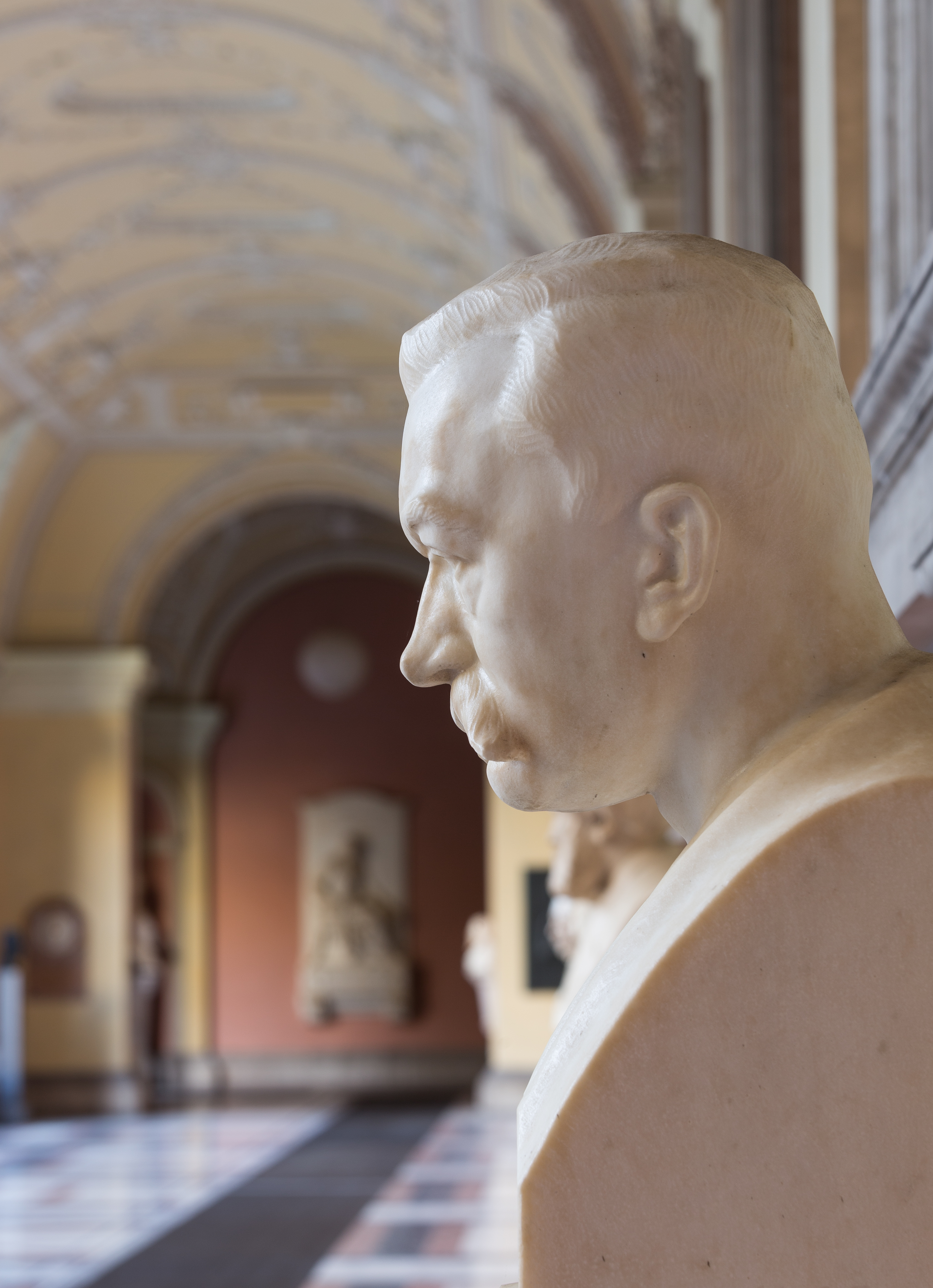
Bust of Edmund von Neusser in the Arkadenhof of the University of Vienna

Edmund von Neusser (1 December 1852 Swoszowice – 30 July 1912, Bad Fischau) was an Austrian internist of Polish origin.

He studied medicine in Kraków and Vienna, earning his medical doctorate in 1877. At the University of Vienna, he was a student of epidemiologist Anton Drasche. Beginning in 1880, he spent several years as an assistant to Heinrich von Bamberger in Vienna, afterwards being named primary physician at the Rudolfspital (1889). In 1893 he became a full professor and director of the second medical clinic in Vienna.

He specialized in disorders of the blood, circulatory system, liver and adrenal glands, and was considered an excellent diagnostician. In 1892, the Neusserplatz in Rudolfsheim-Fünfhaus (15th District of Vienna) was named in his honor, and in 1905 he was elevated to Austrian nobility.

== Associated term ==
- Neusser granules: Tiny basophilic granules sometimes observed in an indistinct zone about the nucleus of a leukocyte.

== Selected works ==
- Pellagra in Österreich und Rumänien, 1887 - Pellagra in Austria and Romania.
- Die Erkrankungen der Nebennieren, in: Spezielle Pathogie und Therapie, (Hg.) H. Nothnagel, 1897 - Diseases of the adrenal glands.
- Die Gallensteine, in: Deutsche Klnik, Bd. 5, 105 - Gallstones.
- Ausgewählte Kapitel der Klinischen Symptomatologie und Diagnostik, (four volumes); Three parts translated into English and published as "Clinical treatises on the symptomatology and diagnosis of disorders of respiration and circulation" (1907-1909).
