= Judith Bamberger =

American mechanical engineer

Judith Ann Bamberger is an American mechanical engineer whose research has concentrated on the measurement of physical properties in materials undergoing multiphase flow, especially through the use of ultrasound, and its applications in the cleanup of the Hanford Site. She is a senior research engineer at the Pacific Northwest National Laboratory, in its Energy and Environment Directorate.

== Education ==
Bamberger majored in physics and chemistry at Dickinson College. She has a master's degree in mechanical engineering from Pennsylvania State University, and completed her Ph.D. in mechanical engineering at Washington State University. Her 2013 doctoral dissertation, Characterizing and Modeling of Concentration Profiles during Pulsed Jet Mixing of Slurries, was supervised by Cecilia Richards.

== Recognition ==
Bamberger was named as an ASME Fellow in 2014. She was the recipient of the 2015 Tri-Cities Engineer of the Year Award.

== Personal life ==
Bamberger also competes as a triathlete.
