= Julius and Agnes Zancig =

American stage magicians and writers

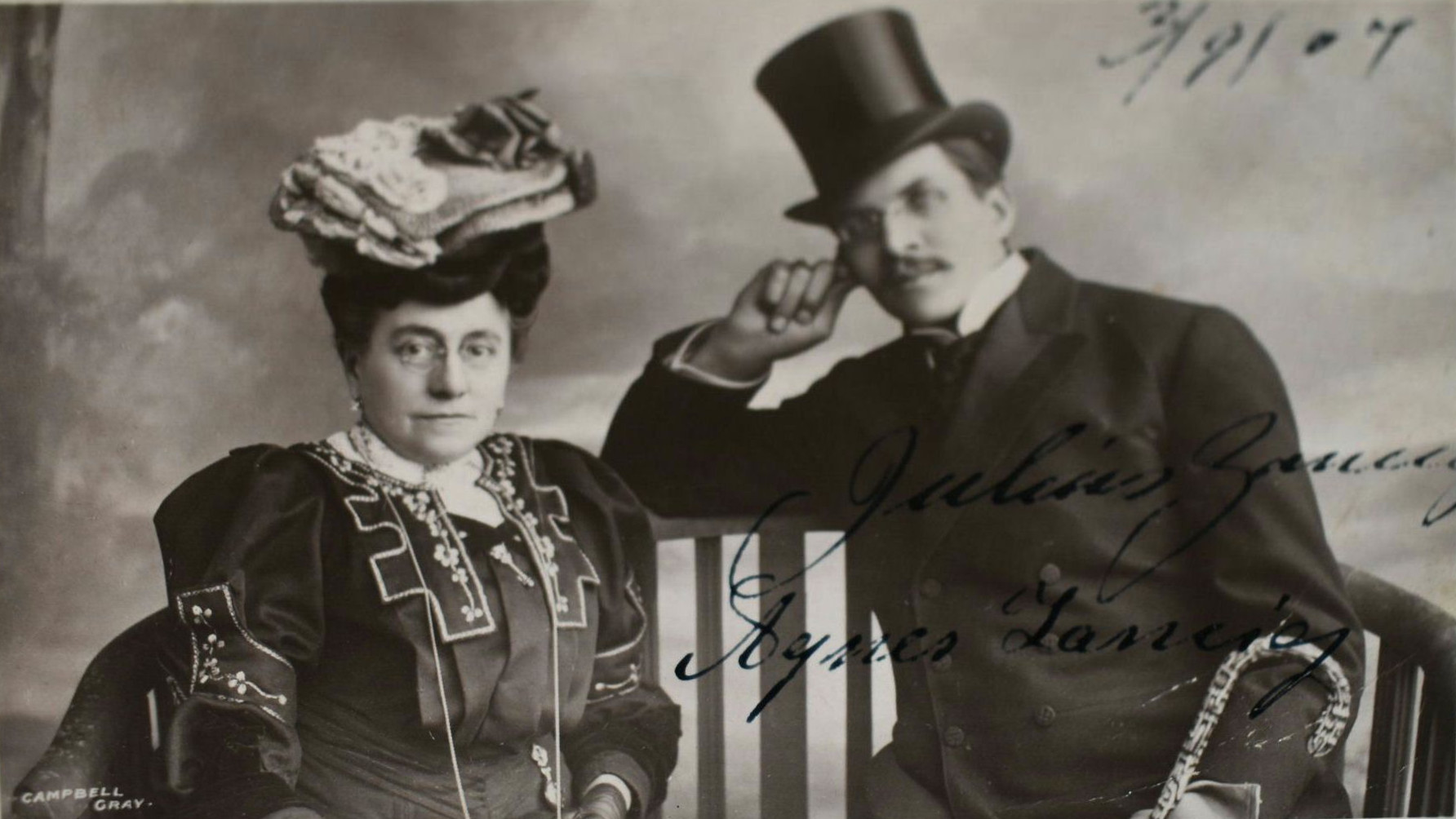
- Occupation: Mentalists

Julius and Agnes Zancig were American stage magicians and writers on occultism who performed a spectacularly successful two-person mentalism act during the late 19th and early 20th centuries.

Born Julius Jörgensen and Agnes Claussen in Copenhagen, Denmark, the Zancigs managed to fool many spiritualists into believing they had genuine psychic powers. Julius later confessed that their mentalist acts were based on a complex code that they had utilized.

== Career ==
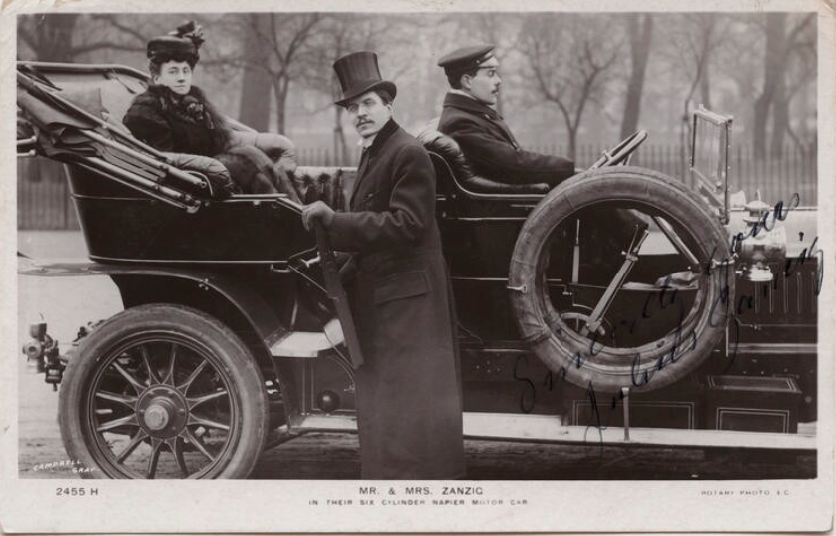
Julius and Agnes Zancig

Julius Zancig in his early career worked in iron smelting. Julius and Agnes had been childhood sweethearts in Denmark but grew apart, then met and fell in love again after both had emigrated to the United States. They were married in 1886. Julius later became interested in mentalism and with Agnes, took a mind reading act to the stage.

From their first professional appearance in the 1880s until Agnes's death in 1916, Julius and Agnes performed together as "The Zancigs". Their act was billed as "Two Minds with but one Single Thought". The Zancigs' act involved Agnes sitting blindfolded on stage while Julius would receive objects and written words from the audience; Agnes would then describe the objects using "telepathy". Lord Northcliffe, owner of the Daily Mail, used the tabloid to "influence opinion in favour of telepathy, which he believed took place between Julius and Agnes". The physicist Oliver Lodge and the author Arthur Conan Doyle also believed the Zancigs to be genuine.

As a performing duo, The Zancigs toured the world, visiting England, India, China, Japan, Australia, and South Africa. After several years of travel, they again settled in the United States. During the early 1900s, Julius Zancig wrote articles for magazines. Both individually and as a pair, Agnes and Julius also wrote and published several books on such occult methods of divination and fortune telling as cartomancy, palmistry, and scrying with a crystal ball. On the title pages of these books, they styled themselves "Prof. Zancig" and "Mdme. Zancig."

In 1916, at around age 59, Agnes died. Julius remarried to a schoolteacher named Ada, who had been born in Brooklyn, New York. Ada was a spiritualist, and she became Julius's new partner in the mentalism act. However, Ada was shy and was "ashamed to face the audience with a blatantly fake act". By 1917, Ada's dislike for public appearances had become so strong that Julius hired Paul Vučić (a.k.a. Paul Rosini) to take her place, under the stage-name "Henry." In 1917, Vučić, born in 1902 in Trieste to Serbian parents, decided to join the armed forces when the U.S. entered World War I and was replaced by David Theodore Bamberg (1904–1974), the teenaged son of the stage magician Theo "Okito" Bamberg. David Bamberg performed the Zancigs' mind-reading act with Julius under the stage name "Syko the Psychic".

In 1919, the Bamberg family left for Europe and Ada rejoined the act. During this time, Julius devoted more of his time to spiritualism, and the public was losing enthusiasm for the act.

== Retirement and private work for clients ==
During the 1920s, the Zancigs retired from touring. Julius was in his mid 60s, and the couple settled down to a quiet life as professional astrologers, tea-leaf readers, crystal ball seers, and palmists, working for private clients. For a while they resided in Philadelphia, Pennsylvania. Julius was a member of the Society of American Magicians.

He wrote his last book, on crystal gazing, in 1926. They were living in Ocean Park, California (now Santa Monica, California), when Julius died in 1929, at the age of 72.

== Method ==
The Zancigs worked their stage act by means of an extremely elaborate and undetectable verbal code, which in later years became known as the Zancig Code. In 1921 a small (but by itself essentially useless) portion of the Zancigs' methodology was published by their friend and fellow mentalist-magician, Alexander the Crystal Seer.

In 1924, the psychical researcher Harry Price claimed that Julius had revealed to him his method of using a code. Price later commented:

The Zancigs' performance took years of study to perfect, and several hours practice daily were needed to keep the performers in good form. I have the Zancigs' codes in my library and know the hard work that both Mr. Julius Zancig and his wife put into their 'act,' a matter which I have discussed with Mr. Zancig himself.

The spiritualists Arthur Conan Doyle and W. T. Stead were duped into believing that the Zancigs had genuine psychic powers. Both Doyle and Stead wrote that the Zancigs performed telepathy. In 1924, Julius confessed that their mind reading act was a trick and published the secret code and all the details of the trick method they had used under the title of Our Secrets! in a London newspaper.

Writing in 1929, the year of Julius Zancig's death, the British magician Will Goldston described their methods.

The pair worked on a very complicated and intricate code. There was never any question of thought transference in the act. By framing his question in a certain manner, Julius was able to convey to his wife exactly what sort of object or design had been handed to him. Long and continual practice had brought their scheme as near perfection as is humanly possible. On several occasions confederates were placed in the audience, and at such times the effects seemed nothing short of miraculous. All their various tests were cunningly faked, and their methods were so thorough that detection was an absolute impossibility to the laymen.

In the 1940s, Robert Nelson published a simple stage code which superficially resembled that of the Zancigs, but it did not permit the diversity of expression they had achieved.

To this day, the Zancig Code, also known as "Two Minds With But a Single Thought," is considered by many professional mentalists to be the most dauntingly complex two-person communication system of its type ever devised.

== In popular culture ==
When Stan Laurel, of the comedy team Laurel and Hardy, was approached by the fans who were starting the Laurel and Hardy fan club, "Sons of the Desert," he was asked to supply a motto for the lodge's logo and suggested a parody of the Zancigs' famous tag-line, "Two Minds Without a Single Thought!"

== Influence ==
In 1908 Julius Zancig met Edward Cyril De Hault Laston who became the stage performing mnemonist known as 'Memora'. It was Julius Zancig who promoted Laston's talents to W. T. Stead.

Through Theo Bamberg (aka "Okito"), in 1916, Julius Zancig met the man who would become the extraordinary magician Paul Rosini (1902-1948). Julius worked with Rosini and helped develop his showmanship, persona and act.

Julius influenced many magicians. In 1924, Harry Houdini wrote that "Mr. Jules Zancig is a magician, a member of the Society of American Magicians of which I have been the President for the past seven years. I believe he is one of the greatest second-sight artists that magical history records. In my researches for the past quarter of a century I have failed to trace anyone his superior. His system seems to be supreme."

== Publications ==
- Twentieth Century Guide to Palmistry (1900)
- New Complete Palmistry (1902)
- How to Tell Fortunes By Cards (1903)
- Two Minds With But A Single Thought (1907)
- Forty Lessons in Palmistry (1914)
- Adventures in Many Lands (1924)
- Crystal Gazing, The Unseen World: A Treatise On Concentration (1926)
