= Bamberg Magical Dynasty =

Dutch family of magicians

The Bamberg Magical Dynasty were a Dutch family of magicians, consisting of six generations of Bambergs. The Bambergs were an upper middle-class Jewish family. Three Bambergs were court magicians who entertained the Dutch royal family, and many of the Bambergs were also trained actors. This chain was unbroken for 165 years, from the 18th to the 20th centuries.

== Jasper Bamberg ==
The first of the Bamberg clan was Jasper Bamberg (1698–1780), who was not a magician but an alchemist and necromancer. He dabbled in chemistry, trying to change base metals into gold. As a necromancer, he tried to revive the dead. His methods were those of the illusionists, using smoke and mirrors. He used hidden magic lanterns that threw pictures on a smoke screen in a darkly lit room. Jasper projected the light off of a revolving mirror on a spindle giving those attending an eerie feeling.

It was written that he attended a dissertation on Cagliostro's theories of the philosopher's stone. The philosopher's stone was a mythical alchemist's tool, believed to help the alchemist turn base metals into gold.

== Eliaser Bamberg ==
Eliaser Bamberg (1760–1833) was the first of the clan to become a professional magician. He was the oldest (possibly adopted) son of Jasper. He was born in 1760 in Leyden, Holland.

Following the French Revolution, on February 1, 1793, France declared war against Holland, England, and Spain. Eliaser was thirty-three years old at that time and was drafted into the navy as a gunner for a Dutch man-of-war. Due to the explosion of a powder keg, one of his legs was badly injured and had to be amputated, after which he was discharged from duty. Eliaser started to make use of a hollowed-out wooden leg to make objects disappear. Eventually, his dexterity with this trick earned him the nickname Le Diable boiteux (French for "the lame devil" or "the crippled devil"). Eliaser performed tricks such as the cups and balls trick, card and coin tricks, and various other sleight of hand tricks, including making live frogs and fish disappear and reappear in a glass bowl of water. He performed in the streets of Leyden, in taverns and public squares, and also at the homes of wealthy patrons. He also used a large collection of automates, one of which was passed down to Robert-Houdin, another magician. Another one, the vaulted figure, was passed through generations of Bambergs. Eliaser eventually died in 1833 at the age of 73.

== David Leendert Bamberg ==
Eliaser had one son, David Leendert Bamberg (23 May 1787 – 29 January 1869). David began assisting Eliaser when he was nine years old. As a young man, David invented the color changing clay pipe trick. In his time, the Egg Bag trick became popular with magicians: a large woolen bag was shown and about fifteen eggs were slowly produced from it. Then a live hen was pulled from the bag. (Modern versions used a small felt or crepe satin bag and produces and vanishes just one egg.) David was the first in the Bamberg family to add the trick to his repertoire using his own method to produce the eggs and hen.

He was initiated into Freemasonry at Arnhem in 1812 and soon rose high in their ranks. In 1843, he became court mechanician (court magician) to William II of the Netherlands and was a favorite of his brother Prince Fredrick, who became friends with David.

David had four sons; two were actors and the other two were magicians. On January 29, 1869, David Leendert Bamberg died in Amsterdam at the age of 83.

== Tobias Bamberg ==
The tradition was passed to David's oldest son Tobias Bamberg (1812–1870). Like his father and grandfather, Tobias spoke French, German, English, and Dutch in his shows. Tobias was also a highly educated scholar.

He was known for his quick wit and sleight of hand. One of his tricks was called the Boomerang Coins, in which he counted about twenty coins onto a tray and the coins were poured in the spectator's hands. Five of the coins were given back to Tobias, who vanished them. The coins returned to the hand of the spectator.

Tobias and his son David Tobias also performed for William II, with Tobias also receiving the honor as court mechanician. Tobias Bamberg died on April 20, 1870, fifteen months after the death of his father. He was 58.

== David Tobias "Papa" Bamberg ==
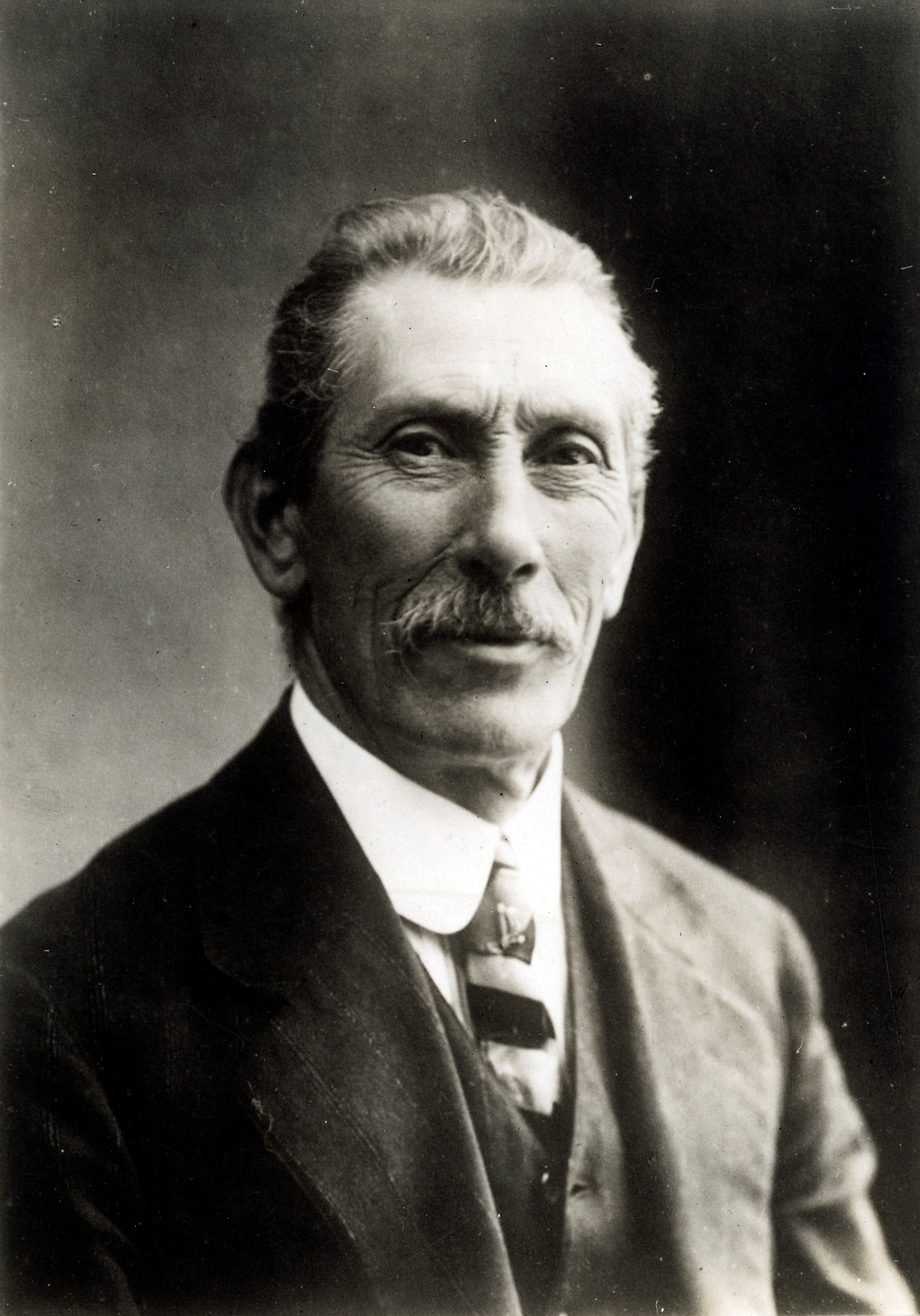
David Tobias Bamberg

Tobias had one son, David Tobias Bamberg (1843–1914), known as Papa Bamberg. Papa Bamberg had six sons, three of whom were magicians. He was originally not a magician, but an actor, mimic, and public speaker. However, after watching a performance of the illusionist Compars Herrmann, Papa changed his mind. In 1866, he gave his first performance in Rotterdam. From there he toured locations including Java, Sumatra, and Ceylon. After his return, Papa Bamberg performed at the Holland Royal Palace, where he was named court mechanician in 1870. He continued his work throughout his life, going on more tours (one with his son in 1907) and doing more royal performances. Papa died in 1914.

== Theo "Okito" Bamberg ==
Theo Bamberg (born Tobias Bamberg) (1875–1963) first appeared at the Holland royal palace with his father for Princess Wilhelmina's birthday when he was eleven years old. After impressing the royal family through this performance, Tobias (Theo) became known as the Smallest conjurer of the world.

In his performances, Tobias originally wore a Japanese kimono so as to more easily hide objects for his magic tricks. He adopted the stage name "Okito," an anagram of Tokio (the spelling of Tokyo at the time). Later, he switched to Chinese robes, finding them more convenient than the kimono, but since he was already well-known as Okito, he kept the name.

He subsequently changed his first name to Theodore (Theo) at the request of his English wife Lily, who disliked the name Toby as a nickname for dogs.

Theo Bamberg traveled the world, performing tricks like his improved production of a bowl of water, the floating ball, the Okito box, and the Sofa trick, among others. Theo retired in Chicago and made magic props for Joe Berg the magic dealer. He died in 1963.

== David "Fu Manchu" Bamberg ==
Theo had three children. His oldest was David Tobias Bamberg (1904–1974), who was known as "Fu Manchu" and toured the world with his own illusion show.

David made his first appearance aged four in Russia, as a little boy dressed up in Chinese clothes, whose father Okito produced him from a cloth. While David was still young, he joined the famous telepathist Julius Zancig. He worked as his partner after Zancig's wife Agnes died. He was with Zancig for a number of years playing the blindfolded medium. He completed his education in the United States and went to England to continue his studies, but instead began training to be a professional magician.

In 1921, he returned to the US and appeared in various magical acts before finding success in Europe. He presented his original comedy shadowgraph act in Vienna, subsequently touring all of Europe. Theo and David also worked together for a time. David later worked with the Great Raymond as an assistant. With the backing of a friend, David created his own show and toured the world as Fu Manchu.

David's only son, Robert, never became a professional magician, thus ending the magical dynasty of the Bambergs.
