= Aurelia (TV series) =

Television series

- Genre: Telenovela
- Country of origin: Mexico
- Original language: Spanish

Original release
- Network: Telesistema Mexicano
- Release: 1968

Aurelia, is a Mexican telenovela produced by Televisa and originally transmitted by Telesistema Mexicano.

== Cast ==
- Patricia Morán
- Enrique Aguilar
- Pituka de Foronda
- Sergio Bustamante
- Graciela Doring
- Mauricio Herrera
- Josefina Escobedo
- Alberto Galán
