= Pelado =

Term for lower-class urban people in Mexico

In Mexican society, pelado is "a term said to have been invented to describe a certain class of urban 'bum' in Mexico in the 1920s." It was used, however, much earlier. American travel writer Lewis Garrard used it in his book, "Wah-to-yah and the Taos Trail," his first-hand account of crossing the Plains to Taos, published in 1850. He wrote: "This hos has feelin's hyar," slapping his breast, "for poor human natur in any fix, but for these palous (pelados) he doesn't care a cuss."

== Historical background ==
Mexico has a long tradition of urban poverty, beginning with the léperos, a term referring to shiftless vagrants of various racial categories in the colonial hierarchical racial system, the sociedad de castas. They included mestizos, natives, and poor whites (españoles). Léperos were viewed as unrespectable people (el pueblo bajo) by polite society (la gente culta), who judged them as being morally and biologically inferior.

Léperos supported themselves as they could through petty commerce or begging, but many resorted to crime. A study of crime in eighteenth-century Mexico City based on arrest records indicates that they were "neither marginal types nor dregs of the lower classes. They consisted of both men and women; they were not particularly young; they were not mainly single and rootless; they were not merely Indian and casta; and they were not largely unskilled." None of the popular stereotypes of a young rootless, unskilled male is borne out by the arrest records. "The dangerous class existed only in the collective mind of the colonial elite."

They established a thieves' market across from the viceregal palace, which was later moved to the Tepito area of the working-class Colonia Guerrero. They spent much of their time in taverns, leading to the official promotion of theater as an alternative.

Initially, many of these plays were organized by the church, but the people soon set up their own theaters, where the humor of the taverns survived. The rowdy, often illegal stagings were no place for sophisticated plot lines or character development, and the carpa ("tent") theater relied heavily on stock characters who could deliver the audience quick laughs. The pelado became one of them.

== Significance of the term ==
Literally meaning "peeled" (barren, bleak, or exposed), the term referred to the penniless urban slum-dwellers or homeless, sometimes migrants from the countryside and un- and under-employed. Like the léperos before them, they were an underprivileged element with criminal tendencies—a threat to Mexican society. But in addition to their predecessors' problems adjusting to urban life and surviving, the "pelado" of the early twentieth century was also wedged between traditional and modern societies.

"Pelado" also means "bald" or "shaven" head, referring to the custom in jails and assistance institutions to cut the inmates' hair in order to prevent lice and other parasites. Thus, "pelado" becomes a catch-all term for low-class and popular-culture people.

As the Mexican government sought to define itself as modern, the philosopher Samuel Ramos saw the pelado as a symbol on Mexican identity. "The 'pelado' embodies a virile form of protest intended to mask a deep-seated sense of inferiority."

In Samuel Ramos's 1934 ontological study of the Mexican character, the pelado is described as "the most elemental and clearly defined expression of national character."

== Peladito ==
One shrewder, gentler subgenre of the pelado archetype is the peladito, a type epitomized by Cantinflas. According to the comedian, "the peladito [...] is the creature who came from the carpas with a face stained with flour or white paint, dressed in rags, the pants below the waist and covered with patches, the belt replaced by an old tie, the peaked cap representing a hat, the ruffled underwear that shows at any provocation, the torn shirt, and gabardine across his left shoulder."

== See also ==
- Chilango
