= No todo lo que brilla es oro =

Mexican telenovela

- Genre: Telenovela
- Directed by: Miguel Angel Herros; Guillermo Diazayas; Irene Sabido
- Starring: Pancho Córdova; María Rojo
- Country of origin: Mexico
- Original language: Spanish

Production
- Executive producers: Ernesto Alonso; Valentín Pimstein; Guillermo Gonzalez Camarena

Original release
- Network: Canal de las Estrellas
- Release: 1978

No todo lo que brilla es oro is a Mexican telenovela produced by Ernesto Alonso, Valentín Pimstein and Guillermo Gonzalez Camarena for Canal de las Estrellas in 1978.

== Cast ==
- Pancho Córdova
- María Rojo
- Roberto Cobo
- Luis Torner
- Lina Michel
- Pedro de Aguillón
- Héctor Ortega
- Pituka de Foronda
- Tita Greg
