= Madman and Vagabond =

1946 film

- Directed by: Carlos Orellana
- Written by: Ramiro Gómez Kemp; Carlos Orellana
- Produced by: Miguel Contreras Torres
- Starring: Manuel Medel; Meche Barba; Manuel Arvide
- Cinematography: Agustín Jiménez
- Edited by: Fernando Martínez
- Music by: Rosalío Ramirez; Federico Ruiz
- Production company: Hispano Continental Films
- Release date: 10 October 1946
- Running time: 92 minutes
- Country: Mexico
- Language: Spanish

Madman and Vagabond (Spanish:Loco y vagabundo) is a 1946 Mexican comedy film directed by Carlos Orellana and starring Manuel Medel, Meche Barba and Manuel Arvide. The film's sets were designed by the art director Carlos Toussaint.

== Cast ==
- Manuel Medel as Fortunato
- Meche Barba as Virginia
- Manuel Arvide as Licenciado
- José Jasso "El Ojón" as Cacahuate
- Beatriz Jimeno as Sara
- Chel López as Almirante Nelson
- Velia Martinez

== Bibliography ==
- Rogelio Agrasánchez. Cine Mexicano: Posters from the Golden Age, 1936-1956. Chronicle Books, 2001.
