= The Garden of Aunt Isabel =

- Directed by: Felipe Cazals
- Written by: Julio Alejandro; Jaime Casillas
- Starring: Jorge Martínez de Hoyos; Claudio Brook; Ofelia Guilmáin
- Cinematography: Jorge Stahl Jr.
- Edited by: Rafael Ceballos; Peter Parasheles
- Music by: Joaquín Gutiérrez Heras; Bernardo Segall
- Production company: Alpha Centauri
- Distributed by: Películas Mexicanas
- Release date: 1971
- Running time: 104 minutes
- Country: Mexico
- Language: Spanish

The Garden of Aunt Isabel (Spanish: El jardín de la tía Isabel) is a 1971 Mexican historical drama film directed by Felipe Cazals and starring Jorge Martínez de Hoyos, Claudio Brook and Ofelia Guilmáin. During the early 16th century, two Spanish ships are wrecked on the Mexican coast. A group of survivors set out on a trek to try to locate a famed El Dorado.

Most of the locations used were around the Maya archeological zone near Tulum, but some took place on Cozumel. Locals claim the film's animal handler released boa constrictors used in the film on the island after production wrapped, explaining the species' introduction there.

== Cast ==
- Jorge Martínez de Hoyos as Capitaine de Ballesteros
- Claudio Brook as Gonzalo de Medina
- Ofelia Guilmáin as Xeneta
- Gregorio Casal as Diego
- Jorge Luke as Roderico
- Javier Esponda as Césat
- Augusto Benedico
- Julián Pastor
- Germán Robles
- Alfonso Arau
- Claudio Obregón
- Martha Navarro
- Roberto Dumont
- Juan Peláez
- Carlos Fernández
- Dunia Saldívar
- Pilar Sen
- Lilia Aragón
- Gastón Melo
- Héctor Ortega
- Roberto Rivero
- Jorge Rado
- Alfredo Torres
- Farnesio de Bernal
- Aarón Hernán
- Carlos Nieto
- Carlos Cardán
- Carlos Jordán
- Ramón Fernández
- Mario Castillón Bracho
- Patricia Ferrer
- Max Kerlow
- Carlos Agostí
- Nathanael León
- Luis del Río
- Ramón Menéndez
- José Vidal
- Hernando Name

== Bibliography ==
- Mora, Carl J. Mexican Cinema: Reflections of a Society, 1896-2004. McFarland & Co, 2005.
