= Edward Cyril De Hault Laston =

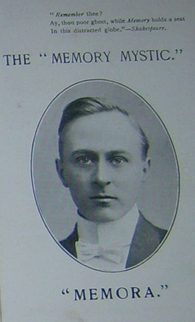
Edward Laston in about 1908

Edward Cyril De Hault Laston (27 April 1883 – 7 November 1951) was a British mnemonist, known for his stage performances and memory recall.

Laston was born in 1883 in Brixton, London, England, to parents Laura Elizabeth Browne and Samuel De Hornigold Laston. He was raised primarily by his mother after the death of his father in 1888, in both Camberwell, London and in various parts of India. In 1894 he is recorded as being schooled at Mussorie Stokes School in India and prior to this at La Martiniere College in Calcutta.

Laston's intention was to join the army, however, a case of rheumatic fever incapacitated him for commission. In 1907, Laston attended a performance of a popular memory man in a Dublin music hall. He admired the performance and set out to emulate what he had seen. Laston acquired a copy of Haydn's Dictionary of Dates and started committing them to memory. By 1908, he had memorised the dates of 1400 battles, and overall a total of 40,000 dates. By this time he had made connections and friends within the performing world, including the famous magicians of the time The Zancigs. In the same year, he offered £100 to anyone who could equal his performance. There is no record of anyone who succeeded in this challenge.

From 1908, for 15 years Laston performed in music halls and theatres up and down the UK, the US, and India. In the US he did a tour that included dates in New York, Boston, Seattle, and Chicago, as well as Calgary and Edmonton in Canada.

For most of his stage career he was known and billed as 'Memora', and in newspaper reviews was often referred to as the 'Human Encyclopedia'.

In 1911, Laston married Marian Lees in Balham, London.

In 1914, Laston wrote the book Memora: an Ideal Memory Trainer (Aids to Memory. Why We Forget and how We Remember). This was presented with the Memora War Game. The book was arranged and compiled by his mother Laura Madden (née Browne).

By the 1920s, Laston and his wife had moved to Asbury Park in New Jersey, US. He had retired from the stage to work in the hotel industry. By the 1940s he returned to the UK; he died in 1951 in Bexhill-on-Sea, East Sussex.

Edward Laston's great great great grandfather was the poet and Reverend Moses Browne of Morden College.
