= La culpa de los padres =

Mexican telenovela

- Genre: Telenovela
- Starring: Silvia Derbez
- Country of origin: Mexico
- Original language: Spanish

Original release
- Network: Telesistema Mexicano
- Release: 1963

La culpa de los padres is a Mexican telenovela produced by Televisa for Telesistema Mexicano in 1963.

== Cast ==
- Silvia Derbez
- Eduardo Fajardo
- Enrique Aguilar
- Sergio Márquez
- Fernando Luján
- Jana Kleinburg
- Pilar Sen
- Irma Lozano
- Aurora Alvarado
- Pituka de Foronda
- Imelda Miller
- Arturo Correa
- Arturo Ferrer
- Lilia Juáres
- Luis Lara
