= Héctor Ortega =

Mexican actor (1939–2020)

Héctor Ortega Gómez
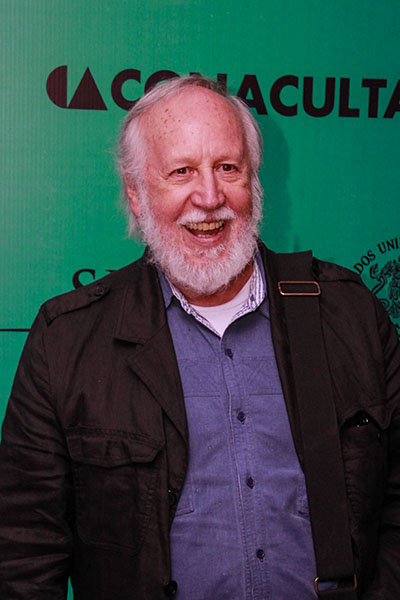
- Born: 12 January 1939; Mexico City, Mexico
- Died: 3 June 2020 (aged 81)
- Occupation: Actor
- Spouse: María Asunción Stoupignan
- Children: 1, Damián Ortega

Héctor Ortega Gómez (12 January 1939 — 3 June 2020) was a Mexican film, television, and theater actor. He was also a screenwriter and a director.

== Early life ==
In 1967 Ortega and María Asunción Stoupignan had a son, Damián Ortega, an artist who began his career as a cartoonist in the newspaper, La Jornada.

== Career ==
Ortega's early work as an actor was primarily in the theatrical field, his first work as an actor was in the film There are no thieves in this village (En este pueblo no hay ladrones) 1964 in which he portrayed an effeminate waiter. After his film debut he appeared in a multitude of films that include Los días del amor, La montaña sagrada, El hombre del puente.

He has appeared in many telenovelas, among them were: Colorina, Cicatrices del alma, Cenizas y diamantes, La última esperanza, La sombra del otro, El privilegio de amar, Mi destino eres tú, Aventuras en el tiempo, Alegrijes y rebujos, La verdad oculta and Querida enemiga.

Ortega has also had an extensive career in theater, both acting and directing.

He has appeared in productions such as ¡Ay Cuauhtémoc no te rajes!, El huevo de Colón, works that he also directed; and in 1822: El año que fuimos imperio for which he received the Best Actor Award by the Mexican Association of Theater Critics (Asociación Mexicana de Críticos Teatrales). He directed works such as Silencio: locos trabajando in which Mexican acting legends such as Héctor Suárez, Fernando Luján, Martha Navarro and Susana Alexander also participated. He directed the theater production Ensalada de locos with Manuel "El Loco" Valdés, Héctor Lechuga and Alejandro Suárez, as well as The accidental death of an anarchist (La muerte accidental de un anarquista) 1983 which was one of the most important works of his career, a production that he also appeared in.

He has also stood out as a scriptwriter and playwright, together with Alfonso Arau, Francisco Córdova and Emilio Carballido he co-wrote the original plot and screenplay for El aguila descalza in 1969. Working together with Arau, Alfonso de la Cabada and the caricaturist Eduardo del Río "Rius", and the comic book Los supermachos for the film Calzonzin Inspector in 1973. In 1976 for the film Cuartelazo, he wrote the original plot and together with Alberto Isaac and María Antonieta Domínguez wrote the screenplay.

In 1976 Ortega made his directing film debut with La palomilla al rescate. The following year he directed his second film Vacaciones misteriosas.

=== Union of Cinema Production Workers ===
In April 1994 Ortega was elected General Secretariat of the Central Committee of the Union of Cinema Production Workers, a four-year position that would last only 10 months. He had been part of the union for 17 years (STPC), a union comprised not only of people who work in cinema, but theater, night clubs and clowns as well. Ortega was dismissed in January 1995 after being accused by a sector of the union of a lack of commitment to its members.

In 2012 Ortega participated in the Bellas Artes reading promotional program "Leo… luego existo" (I read, therefore I exist) at the El Cubo in the Tijuana Cultural Center, where he read from his book "Revistas políticas" (Political Magazines).

== Filmography ==
=== Film ===
Film roles
Year	Title	Role	Notes
1965	There Are No Thieves in This Village	Mesero	
1971	El águila descalza	Factory worker / Transit police	
1971	Pubertinaje		(segment "Una cena de navidad")
1972	Los días del amor	General Terrazas	
1972	The Garden of Aunt Isabel		
1972	El vals sin fin	Francisco Madero	
1972	El rincón de las vírgenes	Gobernador	
1972	Los cacos		
1973	The Holy Mountain	Drug Master	
1973	El premio Nobel del amor		
1973	Those Years	Estrada	
1973	El profeta Mimi	Padre de Mimi	
1974	Cinco mil dólares de recompensa		
1974	Calzonzin Inspector	Periodista	
1975	Tívoli	Lic. Félix Pantoja	
1975	Las fuerzas vivas	Leandro	
1976	El hombre del puente	Secretario del presidente	
1976	La palomilla al rescate		Uncredited
1977	Cuartelazo	Belisarío Domínguez	
1978	Duro pero seguro	Periodista	
1979	Adriana del Río, actriz		
1981	Cuentos de Principes y Princesas		
1986	Outra Vez		
1987	Mariana, Mariana	Priest	
1987	Herencia maldita		
1987	El misterio de la casa abandonada	Librero	
1988	Punto de arroz		Short
1989	El costo de la vida		
1989	Santa sangre	Doctor	
1990	¡Maten a Chinto!	Inés	
1990	Tú decides sobre el sida		Short
1991	La leyenda de una máscara	Juan J. Luna	
1993	Fray Bartolomé de las Casas	Emperador Carlos V	
1995	Algunas nubes	Writer	
1995	Mujeres insumisas	Urtiz	
1996	Cuestión de gustos	Tío Eustaquio	Short
1999	Las delicias del poder	Santos Barboza	
1999	La paloma de Marsella		
2000	Por la libre	Felipe	
2001	Otaola o la república del exilio	Indalecio	
2002	Francisca		
2003	Lucía, Lucía	The Cannibal	
2003	La hija del caníbal	El Caníbal	
2006	El Cobrador: In God We Trust	Periodista 1	
2010	No eres tú, soy yo	Edmundo	

=== Telenovelas ===
Telenovela roles
Year	Title	Role	Notes
1978	No todo lo que brilla es oro		
1980-1981	Colorina	Toribio	4 episodes
1984	Los años felices	El Padrino	3 episodes
1986	Cicatrices del alma	Padre René	3 episodes
1987	Herencia maldita		Episode: " El motel"
1990	Cenizas y diamantes	Gabino	3 episodes
1993	La última esperanza	Don Moy	3 episodes
1996	La sombra del otro	Dr. Frank Gluck	
1997	No tengo madre	Ezequiel	3 episodes
1998–1999	El privilegio de amar	Valentín Fonseca	52 episodes
2000	Amigos para siempre	Crispín Ávila	2 episodes
2000	Mi destino eres tú	Anselmo Sánchez Pérez	3 episodes
2001	Aventuras en el tiempo	Kent Wolf	
2001	Navidad sin fin	Gregorio	1 episode
2003–2004	Alegrijes y rebujos	Don Darvelio Granados	5 episodes
2006	La verdad oculta	Santiago Guzmán / Fausto Guillén / Mario Genovés	121 episodes
2006–2007	Las dos caras de Ana	Leopoldo "Polo" Ribadavia	1 episode
2008	Querida enemiga	Toribio Ugarte	1 episode
2010	Zacatillo, un lugar en tu corazón	Abundio Zárate	129 episodes
2011–2012	Amorcito corazón	Padre Crisóstomo	
2012	Por ella soy Eva	Richard Fairbanks	Episode: "Pierde un negocio importante"
2013–2014	Por siempre mi amor	Doctor	8 episodes
2015–2016	Simplemente María	Priest	
2018	Hijas de la luna	Padre Camilo	20 episodes, (final appearance)

=== TV series ===
Television roles
Year	Title	Role	Notes
1973	Detective de hotel		
1983	Mi colonia la esperanza		
1989	Hora marcada	Lalo	Ep. "El motel"
1990	El motel de la muerte		TV movie
1997	Mujer, casos de la vida real		
1998	Qué nos pasa?		
2001	Diseñador ambos sexos	Papá de Jean Phillipe	Ep. 8: ¿Quién diablos es Jordy? Ep. 9 Cita a ciegas
2007	Vecinos	Don Severiano	Ep. "La última conquista"
2009	Hermanos y detectives		
2010	Gritos de muerte y libertad	Don Agustín Pomposo	Ep. "Retrato de una Leona"
2013	Como dice el dicho	Don Laco	

== Awards and nominations ==
- Mexican Association of Theater Critics – Best Actor Award for 1822: El Año en que Fuimos Imperio in 2002
- Ariel Award – Best Picture Award for Mariana, Mariana in 1987
- 19th Ariel Awards – Best Actor Nomination for Cuartelazo in 1977
- 15th Ariel Awards – Best Supporting Actor Nomination for El Rincón de las Vírgenes as Gobernador in 1972
- Ariel Award – Best Original Story for El águila descalza in 1972
- Ariel Award - Best Picture for El águila descalza in 1972

== Stage ==
- Para leer Cien años de Soledad 2008, Ortega also directed
- 1822, el año que fuimos imperio 1996

== Bibliography ==
2006 – Revistas Políticas. Las últimas revistas cómico políticas del siglo y del milenio

1994 - El cómico proceso de José K.: adaptación de la obra El proceso de Franz Kafka
