= Chilango =

Mexican slang demonym for residents of Mexico City

Chilango (pronounced [tʃiˈlaŋɡo]) is a Mexican slang demonym for natives of Mexico City. The Royal Spanish Academy and the Mexican Academy of Language give the definition of the word as referring to something "belonging to Mexico City", in particular referring to people native to Mexico City.

== History of the term ==
There are many theories on the origin of the word "chilango". One of them is that it derives from the Nahuatl word Ixachitlān, that actually refers to the whole of the American continent. The word "shilango" has also been documented to have been used in the Veracruz area to mean people from central Mexico, and coming from the Maya "xilaan" meaning curly or frizzy haired. Yet another theory is that it comes from the Nahuatl "chilan-co", meaning where the red ones are, and referring to the skin, reddened by the cold, and used to refer to Aztecs by the Nahua people in the Gulf of Mexico.

== See also ==
- Mexican Spanish
- Pelado

== Notes ==
- Etymology of "chilango" (in Spanish)
