= Carpa Valentina =

Carpa Valentina was a theatre troupe of the Mexican carpa (traveling tent) circuit during the 1920s and 1930s.

It was founded by a family of Russian circus performers who fled the turmoil of the 1919 Russian Civil War, arriving in the port of Manzanillo in 1923. The troupe consisted of Gregor Ivanoff, the father of the family, who Hispanicized his name to Gregorio Ivanova, his three daughters, his son-in-law Estanislao Shilinsky, a Lithuanian who wrote the material, and native Mexican performers. They set up their act in the Tacuba delegación of Mexico City.

In 1929, Mario Moreno ("Cantinflas") joined the troupe. Shilinsky coached the comedian, then eighteen years of age, and helped him refine his style. Together, the two turned the Carpa Valentina into the hottest ticket in town.

Moreno began courting Valentina Ivanova, the daughter for which the troupe was named, but her father never approved of the relationship and refused to increase the comic's salary despite his success. Fed up with the abuse, Moreno left the troupe, bringing his writer with him.
