= Murder in the Studios =

- Directed by: Raphael J. Sevilla
- Written by: David T. Bamberg; Raphael J. Sevilla; Adelaida Noriega; Ramón Pérez Peláez
- Produced by: José Sotomayor
- Starring: David T. Bamberg; María de los Ángeles Santana; Ricardo Mondragon
- Cinematography: José Ortiz Ramos
- Edited by: Juan José Marino
- Music by: Jorge Pérez
- Production company: Astro Films Mundiales
- Release date: 29 March 1946
- Running time: 86 minutes
- Country: Mexico
- Language: Spanish

Murder in the Studios (Spanish:Asesinato en los estudios) is a 1946 Mexican mystery film directed by Raphael J. Sevilla and starring David T. Bamberg, María de los Ángeles Santana and Ricardo Mondragon.

== Cast ==
- David T. Bamberg as Fu Manchu
- María de los Ángeles Santana as Elena Palmer
- Ricardo Mondragón as González
- José Morcillo as Bernal
- Ángel T. Sala as Lt. Palomino
- Freddie Romero as Lucifer
- José Pidal as Santos
- Víctor Velázquez as Pepe
- Antonio Pueyo
- Alma Lorena as Pola Blanqui
- Salvador Lozano as David Martín
- Ángel Di Stefani as Raúl Roldán
- Enriqueta Reza as Actriz criada
- Natalia Ortiz as Sirvienta de Elena
- Austy Russell
- Carlos Villarías as Doctor
- Enrique Zambrano
- Enrique Monato
- Lupe Garnica
- Esther Beltri
- Rosalba Durán
- Inocencio Pantoja
- Alfonso Alvarado
- Manuel Roche
- Roberto Cañedo as Camarografo
- Carlos Rincón Gallardo
- Arturo Soto Urena
- Lupe Carriles as Mesera
- Adolfo Ballano Bueno
- René Cardona as René Cardona
- Esther Luquín as Actriz
- Ramón Armengod as Ramón Armengod
- Raphael J. Sevilla as Director
- Pituka de Foronda
- Ana Lou Rodríguez

== Bibliography ==
- Paulo Antonio Paranaguá. Mexican Cinema. British Film Institute, 1995.
