= Damián Ortega =

Mexican visual artist (b. 1967)

- Born: Damián Ortega Stoupignan; July 1967 (age 58); Mexico City, Mexico
- Known for: Sculpture, installation, mixed-media art
- Father: Héctor Ortega

Damián Ortega (born July 1967) is a Mexican visual artist, known for his contemporary sculpture, installation art, and mixed-media art. He lives in Mexico City and Berlin.

== Early life and education ==
Damián Ortega was born in July 1967 in Mexico City, Mexico. His father is actor and filmmaker Héctor Ortega Gómez, and his mother is María Asunción Stoupignan.

== Career ==
One of Ortega's most well-known works is "Cosmic Thing" (2002), a large-scale installation composed of a disassembled Volkswagen Beetle suspended from the ceiling, with each part hanging individually in space.

== Honors and awards ==
- Hugo Boss Prize, 2007 (nominated)
- Smithsonian Artist Research Fellowship, 2014
- Inaugural recipient of the Ezratti Family Prize for sculpture at the Institute of Contemporary Art in Miami.
- 2023 Zurich Art Prize
