= Cuban pastry =

Cuban baked puff pastry–type pastries

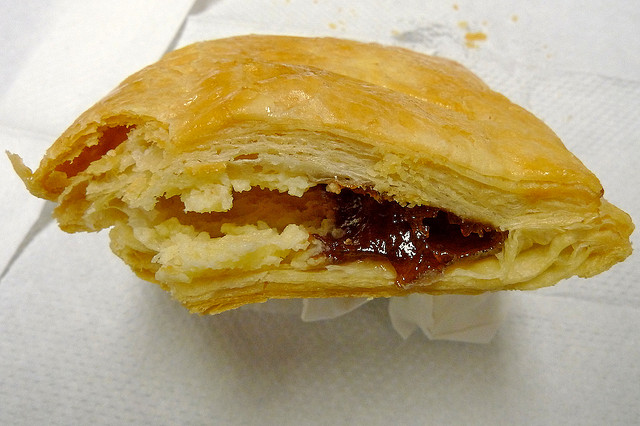
- Type: Pastry
- Place of origin: Cuba
- Main ingredients: Puff pastry, sweet or savoury filling

Cuban pastries (known in Spanish as pasteles or pastelitos) are baked puff pastry–type pastries filled with sweet or savory fillings.

Traditional fillings include cream cheese quesitos, guava (pastelito de guayaba) and cheese, pineapple, and coconut. The sweet fillings are made with sweetened fruit pulps. The cream cheese filling is also a slightly sweetened version of cream cheese, that resembles the flavor and texture of a cheesecake. The savory fillings are usually beef, but sometimes chicken or ham and cheese are used. The beef fillings consist of a seasoned but not spicy meat, made in a tomato-based sauce. It is typical to include raisins and green olives as part of the meat filling. It is also typical for a sweet glaze to be applied to the top of even savory fillings.

The pastries are typically consumed at any time as a snack. In Miami, one can find many "window cafeterias" with customers having a pastelito with coffee throughout the day.

They can be found at many Hispanic cafeterias and have also been introduced into the American retail market by Goya Foods. The pastries are also available in wholesale for the food service industry by several companies, including Hispanic wholesale frozen bakery manufacturer Latin Flavors.

== See also ==
- Empanadilla
- Haitian patty
- Pasteles
- Quesito
