= The Bewitched House =

1949 film

- Directed by: Fernando A. Rivero
- Written by: David T. Bamberg; Fernando A. Rivero; Norman Foster
- Produced by: Eduardo Quevedo
- Starring: David T. Bamberg; Katy Jurado
- Cinematography: Ignacio Torres
- Edited by: Rafael Portillo
- Music by: Jorge Pérez
- Production company: Producciones Eduardo Quevedo
- Release date: 1949
- Country: Mexico
- Language: Spanish

The Bewitched House (Spanish: La casa embrujada) is a 1949 Mexican mystery film directed by Fernando A. Rivero and starring David T. Bamberg and Katy Jurado. The film's sets were designed by the art director Luis Moya.

== Cast ==
- David T. Bamberg as Fu Manchu
- Mary Clark as Alicia
- Carlos Martínez Baena as Inocente de los Ángeles
- Alejandro Cobo as Manuel Beltrán
- Alfonso Bedoya as Vendedor de palomas
- Freddie Romero as Lucifer
- José Elías Moreno as Nicanor
- Ángel Di Stefani as Pitágoras
- Enriqueta Reza as Angelit
- Katy Jurado

== Bibliography ==
- Cotter, Bob. The Mexican Masked Wrestler and Monster Filmography. McFarland & Company, 2005.
