= Samuel Ramos =

Mexican philosopher and writer

Samuel Ramos Magaña
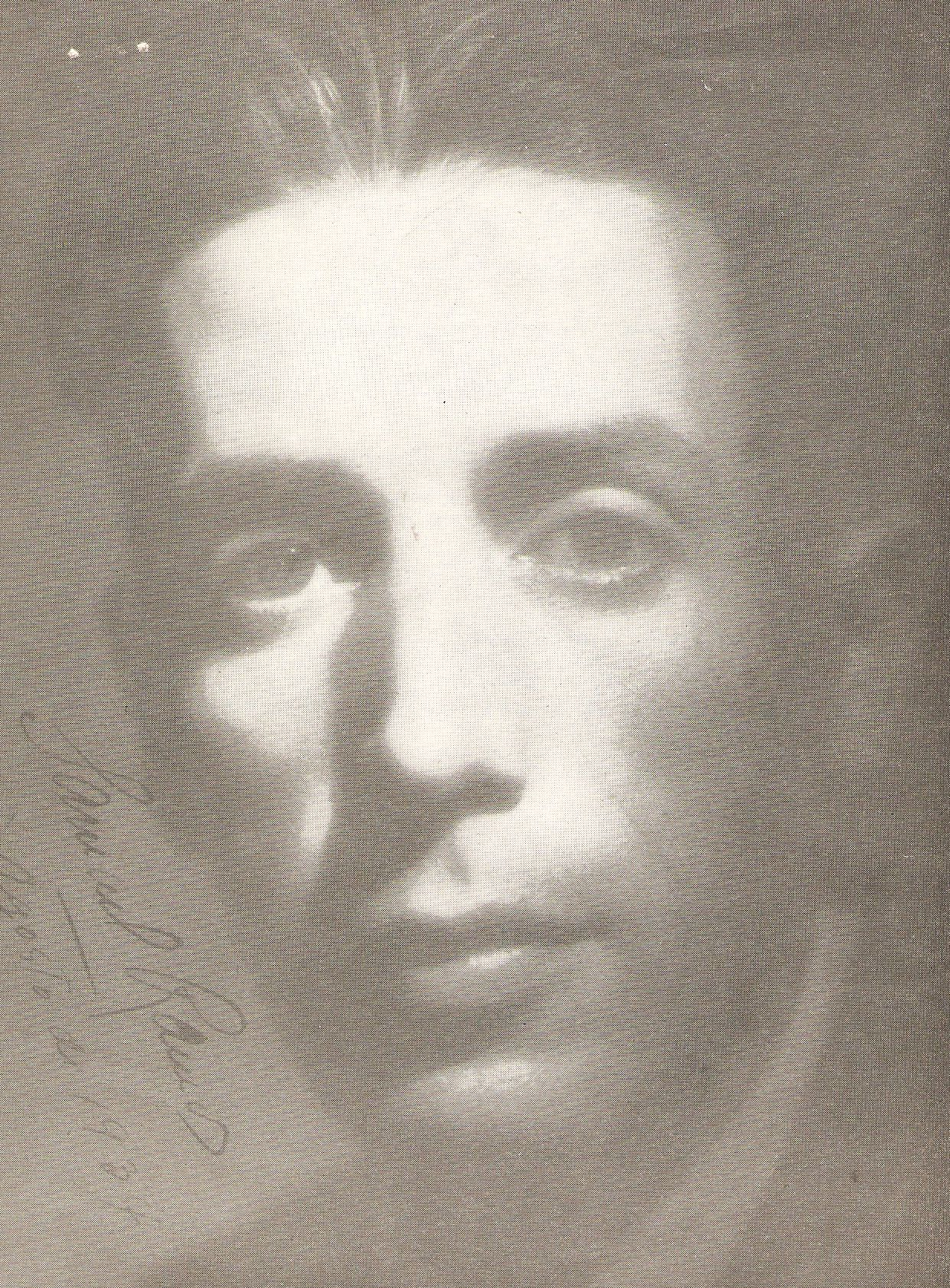
- Born: Samuel Ramos Magaña; 1897; Zitácuaro, Michoacán, Mexico
- Died: June 20, 1959 (aged 62)
- Occupation: Philosopher

Academic background
- Education: Universidad Michoacana de San Nicolás de Hidalgo (BA); Sorbonne; Collège de France; Sapienza University of Rome; National Autonomous University of Mexico (PhD)
- Doctoral advisor: José Torres Orozco

Academic work
- School or tradition: Analytic
- Institutions: National Autonomous University of Mexico
- Main interests: Identity · Metaphysics; Epistemology · Ethics

Samuel Ramos Magaña, PhD (1897 – June 20, 1959), was a Mexican philosopher and writer.

Ramos was born in Zitácuaro, Michoacán, and in 1909 entered the Colegio de San Nicolás Hidalgo (Universidad Michoacana de San Nicolás de Hidalgo). He published his first works in the school's student publication Flor de Loto. In 1915 he began to study philosophy under the tutelage of his mentor, José Torres Orozco.

He spent 1915, his first year of medical school in Morelia, and his second and third years at the Military Medical School in Mexico City. In 1919 he became part of the faculty of higher learning and taught introductory philosophy at the National Preparatory School and logic and ethics at the National Teachers School.

He pursued specialized degrees at the Sorbonne, the Collège de France, and at Sapienza University of Rome. Upon his return to Mexico, he continued to teach and served in the Ministry of Public Education.

In 1944 he earned his doctorate in philosophy from the National Autonomous University of Mexico (UNAM) and became head of the Faculty of Philosophy and Literature there. On July 8, 1952 he began a lifelong term as a member of the prestigious Colegio Nacional.

== Philosophy ==
His work concerns itself with the ontology of the Mexican nation. He sees the pelado, the "urban bum" of the 1920s and 1930s, as "the most elemental and clearly defined expression of national character". The machismo of the pelado, he argues, is the result of an inferiority complex (based on Alfred Adler's concept) and, since the pelado represents the entire country, the "character study" is extended to all of Mexico, and was one of the first post-Revolutionary attempts to define and assess the national character.

== Bibliography ==
- Filosofía de la vida artística. Buenos Aires: Espasa-Calpe Argentina, 1950.
- Philosophy of the Artistic Life translation, 2018.
- Hacia un nuevo humanismo. Mexico City: Fondo de Cultura Económica, 1962 (second edition).
- El perfil del hombre y la cultura en México. Buenos Aires: Espasa-Calpe Argentina, 1952 (second edition). Translated by Earle, Peter G. as Profile of man and culture in Mexico. Austin: University of Texas Press, 1962.
