= The Garcia Brothers (Los Angeles band) =

American Latin jazz conjunto

The Garcia Brothers are a Los Angeles-based Latin jazz conjunto formed pianist Robert Garcia, bassist Raul Garcia, and Rudy Garcia on timbales. Their debut album Jazz con Sabor Latino (1994) was recorded as an octet with a horns section and singer Rolando Mendosa on conga.
