= Pituka de Foronda =

Spanish actress (1918–1999)

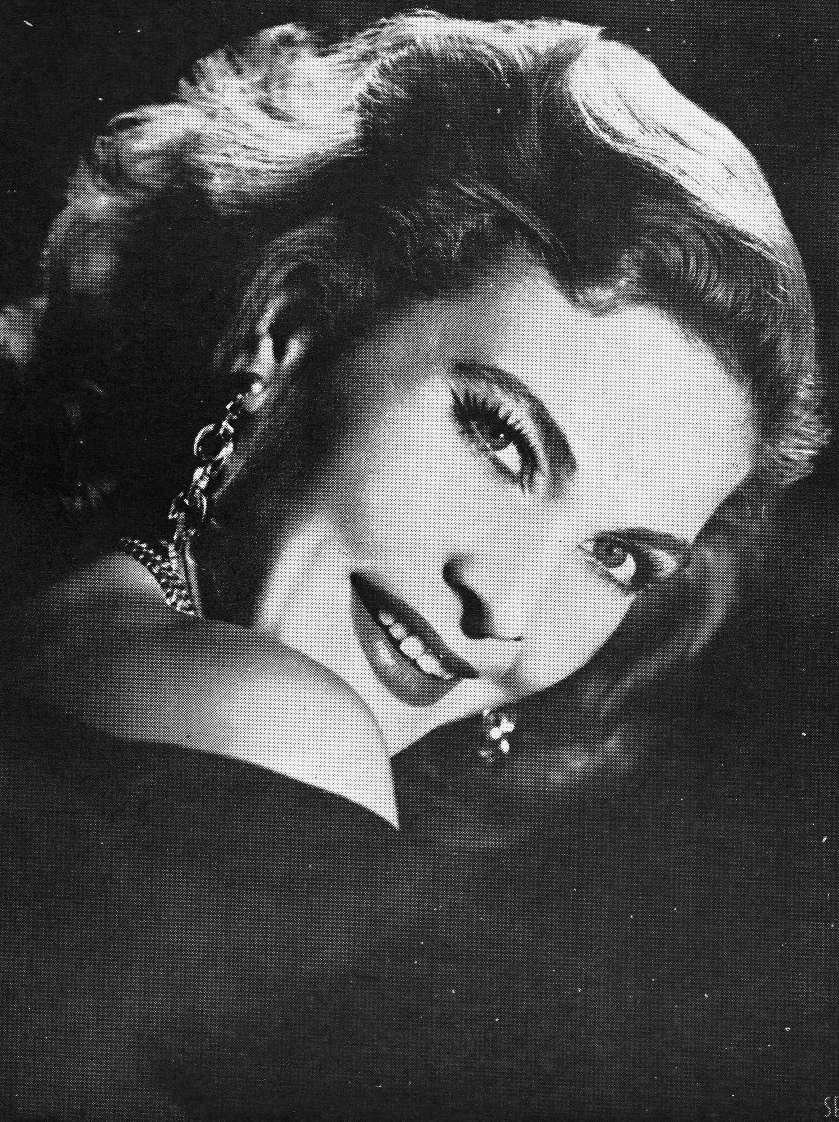
- De Foronda in 1954
- Born: Maria de las Mercedes Mariana y María del Carmen de Foronda y Pinto; 16 July 1918; Santa Cruz de Tenerife, Islas Canarias Spain
- Died: 12 November 1999 (aged 81); Mexico City, Mexico
- Occupation: Actress
- Years active: 1937-1999
- Spouse: Herbert Leighton Wallace (m. 1950; died 1999)

Maria de las Mercedes Mariana y María del Carmen de Foronda y Pinto (16 July 1918 – 12 November 1999), better known as Pituka de Foronda, was a Spanish actress. She appeared in more than twenty films from 1937 to 1996.

== Filmography ==
Film
| Year | Title | Role | Notes |
|---|---|---|---|
| 1937 | La serpiente roja | | |
| 1938 | Ahora seremos felices | Dora Valle | |
| 1942 | Regalo de reyes | Lucha | |
| 1942 | La abuelita | | |
| 1942 | La isla de la pasión | Maria | |
| 1942 | The Three Musketeers | | |
| 1943 | Maravilla del toreo | Fernanda | |
| 1943 | Tormenta en la cumbre | Ana | |
| 1944 | Como todas las madres | | |
| 1945 | The Museum of Crime | | |
| 1946 | Murder in the Studios | | |
| 1946 | Symphony of Life | | |
| 1953 | Los que no deben nacer | | |

TV
| Year | Title | Role | Notes |
|---|---|---|---|
| 1963 | La desconocida | | |
| 1963 | La culpa de los padres | | |
| 1966 | La sombra del pecado | | |
| 1967 | El cuarto mandamiento | | |
| 1968 | Aurelia | | |
| 1978 | No todo lo que brilla es oro | | |
| 1994 | Marimar | Tía Esperanza | |
| 1995 | Maria la del Barrio | Carolina Monroy | |
