= The Black Ace (1944 film) =

1944 film

- Directed by: René Cardona
- Written by: David T. Bamberg; René Cardona; Felipe Subervielle
- Produced by: Felipe Subervielle
- Starring: David T. Bamberg; Manuel Medel
- Cinematography: Gabriel Figueroa
- Edited by: Gloria Schoemann
- Music by: Manuel Esperón
- Production company: Films Mundiales
- Release date: 10 June 1944
- Running time: 78 minutes
- Country: Mexico
- Language: Spanish

The Black Ace (Spanish: El as negro) is a 1944 Mexican mystery film directed and co-written by René Cardona and starring David T. Bamberg and Manuel Medel.

== Cast ==
- David T. Bamberg as Fu Manchu
- Tony Díaz
- Janice Logan
- Chel López
- Manuel Medel
- Salvador Quiroz
- Charles Stevens

== Bibliography ==
- Cotter, Bob. The Mexican Masked Wrestler and Monster Filmography. McFarland & Company, 2005.
