= David Bamberg =

British-born itinerant magician

David Tobias "Theodore" Bamberg (Fu Manchu)
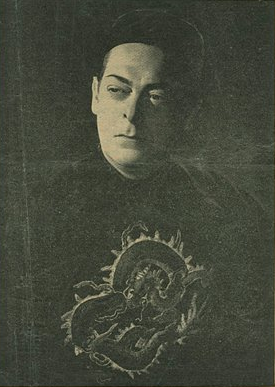
- Bamberg in 1956
- Born: David Tobias Bamberg; 19 February 1904; Derby, England, UK
- Died: 19 August 1974 (aged 70); Buenos Aires, Argentina
- Occupations: Magician, illusionist, shadowist, writer, performer

David Tobias "Theodore" Bamberg (best known by his stage name Fu Manchu) (19 February 1904 – 19 August 1974) was a British-born itinerant magician who traveled with his full evening magic show from the early to mid part of the 20th century. In Bamberg's autobiography, Robert Parrish wrote in the introduction that no other great illusionist could match Bamberg's skill. The Fu Manchu show was known for its comedy, drama, and color.

Bamberg was the sixth and final member of the Bamberg Magical Dynasty, a Dutch family of conjurers whose magical lineage was passed from each of the first-born sons.

== Early life ==
Bamberg was born in Derby, the eldest son of Tobias Bamberg, who performed as "Okito", and his wife Lillian Poole, daughter of Charles William Poole, one of the brothers who ran the famous Poole's Myriorama traveling Diaroma show in England. His father was from the Bamberg Magical Dynasty, a Dutch Jewish family of magicians. During Okito's European tour, Poole became pregnant. She continued to assist him, hiding her pregnancy through her Chinese robe. While in Russia, Poole feared that she would give birth there. They cancelled their contracts in Russia and returned to England. On 19 February 1904, Poole gave birth to their first son. He was named David, and would have one brother and one sister.

Bamberg stayed with his grandfather for a year, but was reunited with his father when he fulfilled the postponed contracts in Russia. It was in Russia that Bamberg first appeared on the stage, at the age of four, as a little Chinese boy being produced from a cloth. It was on their way to Norway that Julius and Agnes Zancig met Bamberg. Agnes predicted accurately that he would follow in her footsteps, although no one else believed it at the time.

After his European contract was through, Bamberg's father was approached by American vaudeville agent Martin Beck. He signed a six-month contract to play the Orpheum Circuit in the United States. He brought Lily and David to America to fulfill the dates. With the money he made in Europe and America, he decided to quit show business and settle in New York. He opened up a magic shop on the corner of Broadway and 28th Street called Bamberg Magic and Novelty Company with Joe Klein. Here he created exclusive magic tricks for magicians such as Harry Kellar, Frederick Eugene Powell, Bernard M.L. Ernst, Samuel Leo Horowitz, and many other leading magicians residing in the United States.

== Career ==
Bamberg performed his first trick in public when he was five years old at the Society of American Magicians meeting. It was a card trick in which he asked club president Harry Houdini to assist him. Bamberg later said that, "I venture to say that very few magicians ever had such a famous assistant." Bamberg said that he never went through the fireman/cowboy/aviator phase that most children his age went through. He constructed a toy theatre and envisioned being the world's greatest magician doing his big illusion show.

Business was bad and ready to close. Kellar convinced Bamberg's father to build illusions for the Thurston show, and Bamberg was to travel with the famous illusionist Howard Thurston and his show. In one point in the show, Thurston asked for the assistance of a boy and a girl. This was Bamberg's cue to jump up on stage. Here Thurston performed David Devant's trick, "Eggs From A Hat".

Howard taught young Bamberg his first card sleight. It was during this tour that Thurston presented Bamberg as his future successor. Thurston promised this to many magicians including Harry August Jansen aka "Dante". Bamberg had no doubt that one day he would be an illusionist with his own show. Through his father's connections, he met Houdini, Kellar, Horace Goldin, and the other leading magicians of the turn of the 20th century. In 1911, Bamberg's sister Dorothy was born in Grand Rapids, Michigan and she was known as the Grand Rapids Baby. Thurston was her godfather. The Bamberg family left the Thurston shortly after that and settled in Brooklyn, New York. It was there that Bamberg would sneak into his father's magic den by sliding under a bookcase. While there he learned from the books and magic tricks in what he called, "this magical paradise".

=== Syko the Psychic ===
In public school Bamberg was known as "the white-haired boy" because of his travels around the world. In the summer of 1917, at the age of 13, Bamberg became one of The Zancigs. He joined Julius Zancig, the world-famous telepathist and worked in partnership with him after Zancig's wife, Agnes, died. Zancig and his wife had been the most famous stage mentalists of their age. Bamberg, as "Syko the Psychic", learned their famous code and played the part of the blindfolded medium divining articles from the audience, solving mathematical problems, and ending with an impressive book test. He completed his education in America and went to England to further his studies, although this did not pan out, and he instead concentrated on becoming a professional magician. He attended performances at the Maskelyne family magic theatre at St. Georges Hall and watched all of the magicians who played there at the time.

=== Return to America ===
In 1921, Bamberg returned to the United States and appeared in various magical acts. He worked as an assistant to a Professor Seward who was a board walk astrologer in Atlantic City. When the Sawing a Woman in Half illusion craze hit, he found a broken down P. T. Selbit. David Bamberg traveled with one of Selbit's Divided Woman company in vaudeville. He worked as an extra in Hollywood.

He met Hilda Seagle who joined him in a mindreading via Zancig; the couple married on 2 November 1923. After working in night clubs during the Prohibition era, Bamberg went abroad again to pursue success. He presented his original comedy Shadowgraphy act in Vienna, then toured Europe. Bamberg also worked with his father, where he learned the "Chinese" act from the bottom up.

=== South America ===
Bamberg wanted to tour with his own show, but his father tried to dissuade him from doing so, suggesting he continue with his shadow act and not invite the stress of the big show. With his new wife Hilda, Bamberg had to find a steady job. He was working as Syko again doing sleight of hand and the shadow act in Bulgaria. It was through Ottokar Fischer in Vienna that Bamberg met the Great Raymond. He was asked to be his assistant for his tour through South America, and to bring a mechanic. The Wierner Magic club suggested a German by the name of Edmund Spreer. So the three of them, Spreer, Bamberg and his wife, left for Bahia, Brazil. When the Great Raymond left South America, Bamberg stayed. He tried to work with his shadow act, but to no avail. Then he heard that Harlan Tarbell was offering a course in magic. As Bamberg was unable to afford anything like that, he was sent the lessons free. With those lessons, he built up a successful act and found work in around that area.

=== Fu Manchu ===
With the advent of talking pictures, variety suffered. For Bamberg it was a choice between doing a big show or nothing. In 1928, he was in Argentina trying to fill dates when Dante brought his show to Buenos Aires. For 120 performances, Dante filled the Casino theatre, which impressed a film-distributorship executive named Walter Gaulke. He saw how much money a big illusion could bring in. By chance he saw David Bamberg hanging around the theatre and asked him if he could do such a show as Dante. Bamberg agreed and drew up the plans.

With Gaulke's backing, Bamberg toured the world as "Fu Manchu". His show was a success from the start. Eventually his productions became the most extravagant and superb show in the world. He was able to use the Fu Manchu name in places like South and Central America, the West Indies, Spanish Morocco, Portugal, and Spain. But, in March 1937 when he came back to the United States, he had to change his name to avoid a lawsuit. He was billed as "Fu Chan" when he played the Cervantes theatre in New York to a successful run.

=== Movie career ===
While performing in one of his own productions in Mexico, Bamberg was asked to star in three films. When the studio could not come up with scripts that satisfied him, he wrote them himself, and would eventually write and star in three more movies.

Planning on retiring, he was eventually urged to go back to the stage and created a new show called Crazimagicana. It premiered in February 1947 at the Teatro Nacional in Buenos Aires. The performance was a quick moving show using blackouts skits that were similar to vaudeville comedians Olsen and Johnson's Broadway revue, Hellzapoppin'. Bored with doing the same show every night, Bamberg eventually wrote a musical comedy called The Devil's Daughter. He wove into the script most of his illusions from past shows and reworked them into the plot. He reworked this play, tweaking it here and there, always having trouble with the second act. Then it finally dawned on him how to fix the problem, and he started the second act with a few new illusions instead of story and he felt it carried the plot story perfectly.

== Last years ==
David Bamberg made and lost many fortunes, always living for the moment and never able to save his money wisely. He did regain much of it by keeping his show running until on 19 March 1966 in Buenos Aires, aged 61, he gave his last full evening show. He retired and opened a magic shop there. In March 1972, Bamberg was admitted to the hospital for ten days and had to be put on oxygen; he reportedly stopped smoking. In a magic magazine, The New Tops, Argentine magic dealer Vernet wrote that Bamberg's typical day was to walk "at the intersection of Riobamba and Bartolome Mitre streets. There he sat facing north in a position from which he could see his shop and read an English newspaper or magazine while sipping his coffee and milk. Once inside Fu Manchu's Magic Center, he sat alone at a green-clothed table, leaning on his elbows waiting for someone to come in."

On 19 August 1974, David Bamberg died, aged 70. According to tradition among magical organizations, members of the Argentine Society of Magicians broke a wand at a memorial services for the last of the Bamberg dynasty. He had one son, Robert, who did not become a professional magician.

== Legacy ==
On 28 February 1965, Bamberg finished his first draft of his autobiography and sent it to many magician friends. Eventually the manuscript was divided into two books, Oriental Magic of the Bambergs by Robert Albo, Eric C. Lewis, and David Bamberg; and Illusion Show by David Bamberg.

A young boy in Cuba named Cesareo Pelaez saw shows by Fu Manchu and later, when he came to the United States, formed a magic production in the Bamberg tradition. On 20 February 1977, in Beverly, Massachusetts, Pelaez aka "Marco" presented Le Grand David and his own Spectacular Magic Company for weekend performances. "Marco", along with Seth the Sensational and David Bull as Le Grand David, presented a spectacular revue in the style of the Fu Manchu show. The vaudeville-inspired stage show continues to this day, after 35 years, honoring the tradition once carried by Bamberg.

After retiring and settling down in his shop in Buenos Aires, Argentina, Bamberg spent much of his time teaching and coaching magicians of the next generation. One of the magicians he taught was an adolescent Marcelo Contento. Contento learned shadowgraphy from Bamberg, and was the only person to fully do so. He went on to tour worldwide with his own shadow act which he developed from what he learned from Bamberg. However, the talent ended there, as Contento was diagnosed with a form of brain cancer and died before his son grew old enough to learn it from him.

Bamberg later published an autobiography titled "Illusion Show: A Life in Magic," which Orson Welles called the "greatest autobiography in magic." Welles and Bamberg were great friends and compatriots, going so far as to debunk phoney magicians together, as Welles would describe on The Dick Cavett Show.

== Selected filmography ==
- The Spectre of the Bride (1943)
- The Headless Woman (1944)
- The Black Ace (1944)
- The Museum of Crime (1945)
- Murder in the Studios (1946)
- The Bewitched House (1949)
