= Babergh =

Babergh may refer to the following places in England:

- Babergh Hundred, a defunct hundred of the county of Suffolk, said to be named for a "mound of a man called Babba"
- Babergh District, a local government district in Suffolk, named after the hundred
