= Universidad Michoacana de San Nicolás de Hidalgo =

Public university in Michoacán, Mexico

Michoacana University of San Nicolás de Hidalgo
- Universidad Michoacana de San Nicolás de Hidalgo
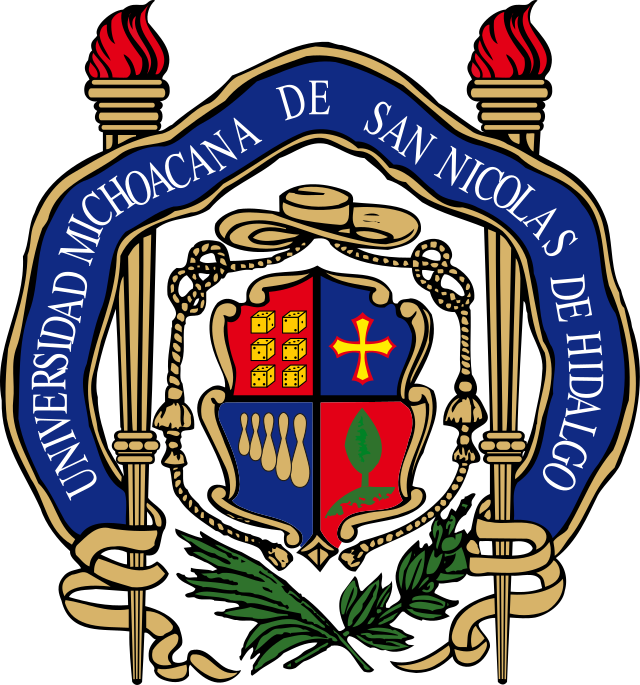
- Former names: Royal College of Saint Nicholas; National College of Saint Nicholas of Hidalgo (1847-1917)
- Type: Public university
- Established: 1540; 486 years ago (as Royal College of Saint Nicholas); 1917 (reopened)
- Rector: Yarabi Avila Gonzalez
- Faculty: 1,636
- Students: 58,224 (2023–24)
- Undergraduates: 43,846
- Postgraduates: 1,790
- Other students: 12,588
- Location: Morelia, Michoacán, Mexico; 19.6914°N 101.2069°W
- Campus: Morelia Uruapan
- Website: www.umich.mx

Michoacana University of San Nicolás de Hidalgo (UMSNH) is a public university in Morelia, Michoacán, Mexico, and the oldest institution of higher education in the Americas. The University grants philosophy, law, economics, computer science, medicine, architecture, and dentistry degrees, plus several other additional fields of study, mainly in Humanities, Science, Engineering and Arts.

== History ==
The institution's historical background dates back to 1540, the year in which Catholic Bishop Don Vasco de Quiroga founded the College of San Nicolás Obispo in the city of Pátzcuaro, with the purpose of training priests to help him in the evangelization of the natives of the vast territory under the jurisdiction.

During his episcopal administration, Vasco de Quiroga showed special concern for consolidating the incipient educational institution. Thanks to his negotiations, on May 1, 1543, Carlos V issued a royal certificate in which he agreed to assume the patronage of the college, for which, as of that date, it was called the Royal College of San Nicolás Obispo.

In 1566, by means of a "royal execution" it was arranged that, in the name of the Spanish monarch, the ecclesiastical council exercised the administration of the Quiroguiano campus. Faced with the demands of the post-Tridentine Church, to impart a new orientation to the formation of priests, in 1574 the chapter decided to transfer academic responsibility to the meritorious Society of Jesus.

=== Philosophical Research ===
The Universidad Michoacana de San Nicolás de Hidalgo has a long tradition in the teaching and research of philosophy. Throughout its history, the university has hosted several influential philosophers, including Samuel Ramos, María Zambrano, and Luis Villoro.

The university's Faculty of Philosophy "Dr. Samuel Ramos Magaña" is devoted to advanced academic training in philosophical studies, with particular strength in philosophical research aimed at strengthening, innovating, and expanding philosophical culture, reinforcing cultural identity, and fostering dialogue within contexts of cultural plurality.

The university also houses the Instituto de Investigaciones Filosóficas, whose primary objective is to advance philosophical research, particularly in the field of analytic philosophy. The institute is regarded as one of the leading centers for analytic philosophical research in Mexico.

=== Change of venue ===
In 1580, due to the change of the episcopal residence from Pátzcuaro to Valladolid, the Royal College of San Nicolás Obispo was also moved, where it merged with the College of San Miguel Guayangareo. The new cathedral headquarters represented a great advance for the strengthening of the bishopric of Michoacán. However, the training of priests continued without responding to the demands of the Council of Tridentine, widely reaffirmed during the Third Mexican Provincial Council of 1585.

To solve this deficiency, from 1590, the fourth bishop of Michoacán, Fray Alonso Guerra, insisted on converting the college into a Tridentine Seminary. Within the ecclesiastical council, this initiative found strong opposition, considering that, if the proposal was accepted, the founding objectives of the campus would be contravened. Upon the death of Bishop Guerra, it fell to his successor, Fray Domingo de Ulloa, to receive – on October 17, 1601 – from Clement VIII a bull in which, taking advantage of the infrastructure of San Nicolás, he ordered the establishment of a Council Seminary.

The council's reaction was immediate: in open contempt, by legal means it undertook an energetic defense that involved the civil and ecclesiastical authorities of New Spain in a confrontation that would last until the year 1610, when Pope Paul V he reversed his predecessor's order.

However, during that time the Colegio de San Nicolás regularly maintained its activities, without incorporating transcendental changes in its classrooms, where essentials were taught to attend the religious services of the Spanish and evangelize the indigenous. Concerned as the Valladolid society was in consolidating itself, it was little interested in its instructional institutions reaching the development of the European ones. The affirmation of the colonial project must have been necessary for the Creoles to feel the need to match their knowledge to that which was in vogue in the Spanish cloisters.

=== Viceroyalty ===
Consequently, at the end of the 17th century, the Colegio de San Nicolás undertook a profound reform of its regulations and constitutions, which served as the basis for modifying the study plan of the beginning of the 18th century, in which, among other disciplines, they included the subjects of Philosophy, Scholastic Theology and Moral Theology.

By royal decree of November 23, 1797, San Nicolás was granted the privilege of incorporating the chairs of Civil Law and Canon Law into his teaching.

It can be affirmed that at the beginning of the 19th century the campus was going through the most solid stage of its existence. Everything seemed to indicate that in the New Spain intellectual world he was embarking on an ascending career. However, the consequences of the independence movement, led by a select group of Nicolaita teachers and students, including Miguel Hidalgo y Costilla, José María Morelos, José Sixto Verduzco, José María Izazaga and Ignacio López Rayón, led the government to Viceregal decided to close it.

=== Independent Mexico ===
Once Mexican independence was achieved, the main concern of the new government focused on national reorganization based on a new project in which, for the first time on this soil, within the priority items, public education was considered. In this way, the actions aimed at the reopening of the campus began during the decade of the 1820s. After a long and painful negotiation between the Church and the State, on October 21, 1845, the ecclesiastical chapter ceded the patronage of the campus to the Michoacán Subdirectorate Board of Studies.

Provided with this legal basis, on January 17, 1847, Governor Melchor Ocampo proceeded to reopen it, under the name of Primitivo y Nacional Colegio de San Nicolás de Hidalgo. This marked the beginning of a new stage in the existence of the institution.

In the second half of the 19th century, chemistry, physics, cosmography, mathematics and biology burst into Nicolaitan classrooms. Laboratories and libraries were enriched by important acquisitions made by the Michoacan government in European countries, while their heritage increased through donations conferred by the state executive from secularized assets to Michoacan temples and convents. The winds of renewal that spread throughout the state during those years were carriers of solid foundations for the creation of a university in Michoacán.

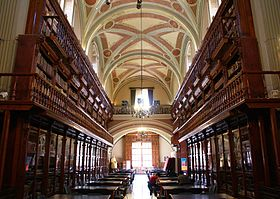
Public Library of UMSNH

This project was consolidated with the triumph of the Mexican Revolution when, a few days after the Michoacán government took office, the engineer Pascual Ortiz Rubio adopted the initiative, and on October 15, 1917, he managed to establish, with the characteristic of autonomy, the Michoacan University of San Nicolás de Hidalgo, made up of the College of San Nicolás de Hidalgo, the schools of Arts and Crafts, Industrial and Commercial for young ladies, Superior of Commerce and Administration, Normal for teachers, Medicine and Jurisprudence, in addition to the Public Library, the Michoacan Museum, the Museum of Independence and the State Meteorological Observatory.

As members of the first University Council, the directors of each campus were appointed; as rector, the engineer Agustín Aragón, who a few days later, for not accepting the constitutional protest to which the members of Congress forced him, resigned from his position. Faced with this setback, the nascent institution was adrift, until, in 1918, Dr. Alberto Oviedo Mota was appointed as the person in charge of initiating university activities.

The following year, Congress appointed Professor José Jara Peregrina as rector, who also promoted actions aimed at consolidating the university. Of these, the Constitutive Law and the creation of the first budget item stand out, which allowed it to correct the pressing needs. In 1920, according to the opinion of Governor Francisco J. Múgica, the university continued "as a group of schools that were independent of each other."

To remedy this abnormality, General Múgica modified the Constitutive Law and appointed new authorities. Ignacio Chávez, a young doctor from Michoacán recently graduated from the National University School of Medicine, occupied the rectory.

During his administration, profound academic and administrative reforms were undertaken, which included modifications to the study plans and programs of all schools. Medicine was the most favored, as the new rector incorporated a host of Michoacán doctors into his teaching staff: his colleagues Salvador González Herrejón, Adolfo Arreguín Vidales and Manuel Martínez Báez, in addition to Ignacio Chávez himself, who promoted a momentous turn to medical teaching in Michoacán.

Annually, the university awards the Father of the Nation Award to the students with the best average.

== Coat of arms ==
The university coat of arms is made up of elements from the coat of arms of the Quiroga family, which Don Vasco bequeathed to the college he founded, which mean: "Given in harmony, under the shadow of religion, fraternally united towards the light of knowledge and teaching, in peace and in victory, under the universality of science and humanities".

In 1917, when the Universidad Michoacana de San Nicolás de Hidalgo was founded, the new institution adopted the shield of the College, with which it sealed the official papers until 1919. From then on, the previous inscription was replaced by that of Universidad Michoacana de San Nicolás de Hidalgo, Morelia. This delay is easy to explain, since from that year the institution begins its academic activities regularly.

When Dr. Ignacio Chávez was rector, in 1921, a substantial transformation occurred in the coat of arms, by which the edges of the plaque were perfected, which remained divided into four quarters. In the first, the six dice appear arranged in two suits. In the first pair one and four points can be seen; in the second, two and five; in the third, three and six. In the second quarter is the flowered cross. In the third the five clubs appear, and in the lower left a mount added to a cypress in a straight position, ending in the lower part with a "spear point". Above and in front, the wide-brimmed episcopal hat and the episcopal pretensions embracing the plaque are preserved, which balance the graphic elements. The double circle takes a breath and opens to become a ribbon, supported by two lighted torches bearing the inscription UNIVERSIDAD MICHOACANA DE SAN NICOLAS DE HIDALGO. Two crossed branches finish off the bottom: one of laurel; the other, olive. It is necessary to consider that they are not clubs if these figures represent a harmonica, and it reads as follows: Dice, harmonica, a tree with a shadow and the cross, now if the symbols coincide, given to harmony under the shadow of the religion. The description of the symbol made by Rodolfo Jiménez Avalos, approximately in 1970 on a visit to the City of Quiroga.

In this regard, Chávez informs that he chose that shield for the nascent university based on the quartered family crest of its illustrious founder: Don Vasco de Quiroga. He only added the border that crowns it, where the name of the university is read, supported by two lit torches, related to science and humanistic culture. It is necessary to point out that, although Dr. Chávez makes this brief description of the shield, he says nothing about the colors, which, as has been mentioned, were red, green, white and gold.

This shield was preserved for a long time. In the sixties the third barracks was deformed: the five clubs were transformed into as many figures that resemble bowling pins.
