= Eugen von Bamberger =

Austrian internist (1858–1921)

Eugen von Bamberger (5 September 1858 – October 1921) was an Austrian internist born in Würzburg, Kingdom of Bavaria. He was the son of pathologist Heinrich von Bamberger (1822–1888).

He studied medicine at the Universities of Vienna and Würzburg, receiving his doctorate in 1882. Afterwards he worked as an assistant to Hermann Nothnagel (1841–1905) at the Allgemeines Krankenhaus in Vienna. From 1891, he was a director of internal medicine at the Rudolfsspital.

In 1889, he provided a detailed description of a condition that has become known as hypertrophic pulmonary osteoarthropathy. During the following year, French neurologist Pierre Marie (1853–1940) was able to differentiate the syndrome from acromegaly. The term "Bamberger-Marie disease" is sometimes used for hypertrophic pulmonary osteoarthropathy.

== Publications ==
- Veränderungen der Röhrenknochen bei Bronchiektasie. Wiener klinische Wochenschrift, 1889, 2: 226.
- Über Knochenveränderungen bei chronischen Lungen- und Herzkrankheiten. Zeitschrift für Klinische Medicin, Berlin, 1891, 18: 193-217.
- Ein Fall von osteoplastischem Prostatakarzinom. Wiener klinische Wochenschrift, 1899, Nr. 44. (with Richard Paltauf 1858-1924) -- treatise on osteoplastic carcinoma.
