= Ana-Maria Bamberger =

Romanian physician and playwright

Ana-Maria Bamberger is a playwright of Romanian origin working in French, English, German, and Romanian. Her plays are performed in theatres and at festivals in more than 15 countries. Bamberger studied medicine and worked in medical research at the National Institutes of Health in Bethesda, Maryland (United States) and at the University Medical Center Hamburg, Germany. She began writing plays in 2003, and attended a Playwriting Masterclass with Stephen Jeffreys at the Royal Court Theatre in London. She was Visiting Dramatist and Assistant Professor at the Paris School of Arts and Culture, the Paris Campus of Kent University. Bamberger has a close artistic relationship with the actress Olga Tudorache who performed in her first three plays.

== Life ==
Ana-Maria Bamberger is a playwright of Romanian origin working in French, English, German, and Romanian. Her plays are performed in theatres and at festivals in more than 15 countries.

A native of Bucharest, Bamberger studied medicine and worked in medical research at the National Institutes of Health in Bethesda, Maryland (United States) and at the University Medical Center Hamburg, Germany. She began writing plays in 2003. Playwriting Masterclass with Stephen Jeffreys at the Royal Court Theatre in London (2011). She was Visiting Dramatist and Assistant Professor at the Paris School of Arts and Culture, the Paris Campus of Kent University.

She formed a close artistic relationship with the actress Olga Tudorache who performed in her first three plays.

The FOYER Theater Magazin, 3Sat, described her plays as "psychologically subtle, combining humour and depth". The Süddeutsche Zeitung sees "a deep seriousness behind biting sarcasm".

== Selected plays and productions ==
=== Notre cher auteur ===
- 2026 Paris - Théâtre La Scène Parisienne

=== Carpe Diem ===
- 2025 Paris - Théâtre Funambule Montmartre

=== The Paradoxe of Desire ===
- 2024 Paris - Théâtre Le Guichet Montparnasse (French title: Le Paradoxe du désir)

=== One Whole Night ===
- 2023 Paris - Théâtre Le Guichet Montparnasse (French title: Une nuit entière)
- 2023 London - White Bear Theatre

=== Talking to you ===
- 2018 Paris - Théâtre Le Guichet Montparnasse (French title: Parler avec toi)
- 2022 Bucharest - Teatrelli (Romanian title: Să vorbesc cu tine)
- Radio adaptation - National Theatre Radio Bucharest

=== Criminals ===
- 2017 Bucharest - Romanian Playwrights' Theatre (Teatrul Dramaturgilor Români) (Romanian title: Infractorii)
- 2019 Paris - Théâtre Le Guichet Montparnasse (French title: Cambriolage)

=== The Stone (co-authored with Christoph M. Bamberger) ===
- 2013 Germany - Theater Paderborn (German title: Der Stein)
- 2014 Paris - Théâtre Studio Hébertot (Transfer: Théâtre Essaion Paris 2015, Festival Avignon - Théâtre des Corps Saints 2015) (French title: Le Rocher)
- 2014 London - Tristan Bates Theatre (Used title: Rock and a Hard Place)
- 2019 Salzburg - Kleines Theater
- Radio adaptation - National Theatre Radio Bucharest (Romanian title: Pietroiul)

=== 10 Questions ===
- 2011 Brighton - Marlborough Theatre
- 2012 Romania - Anton Pann Theatre (Romanian title: 10 Întrebari)
- 2014 Germany - Lichthof Theatre Hamburg (German title: 10 Fragen)
- Radio adaptation - National Theatre Radio Bucharest

=== Taxi Blues ===
- 2011 Bucharest - Nottara Theatre / Teatrul National Bucuresti 2015

=== Blind Date ===
- 2011 Hamburg - Kontraste Theater

=== Belvedere ===
- 2010 Hamburg - Kontraste Theater / Vagantenbühne Berlin
- 2011 Romania - Classic Theatre Arad
- 2012 London - White Bear Theatre
- 2020 Paris - Théâtre Le Guichet Montparnasse
- 2021 Madrid - Teatro Sanchinarro & Teatro Carril del Conde
- 2021 London - Old Red Lion Theatre
- 2022 Paris - Théâtre de Nesle (English)
- Radio adaptation - National Theatre Radio Bucharest, UNITER AWARD nomination

=== Three O'Clock ===
- 2010 Romania - National Theatre Sibiu, German Section
- 2010 Munich - Rosstall Theatre
- 2021 Germany - Stadttheater Weilheim
- Radio adaptation - National Theatre Radio Bucharest, Best actress Award, Grand Prix Nova

=== The Portrait of Donna T. ===
- 2008 Bucharest - Arcub Theatre / Transfer: Mic Theatre (Teatrul Mic) (Romanian title: Portretul doamnei T.)
- 2008 Germany - EuroCentral Theatre Bonn (German title: Das Portrait der Donna T.)
- 2011 Prague - ABC Theatre (Divadlo ABC)
- 2022 Paris - Théâtre Le Guichet Montparnasse (French title: Le Portrait de Madame T.)
- Radio adaptation - National Theatre Radio Bucharest, UNITER AWARD winner

=== Martha, Marina ===
- 2004 Bucharest - Theatrum Mundi / Transfer: Metropolis Theatre (Romanian title: Peste cu mazare)
- 2008 Munich - Rosstall Theatre (German title: Martha, Marina)
- 2011 New York City - Davenport Studio staged reading with Tony Award Winner Mary Louise Wilson & Mary McCann
- 2016 Avignon - Théâtre La Luna (French title: Poisson et petits pois)
- 2018 Paris - Théâtre Funambule Montmartre (French title: Poisson et petits pois)

=== November ===
- 2003-2012 Bucharest - National Theatre Bucharest (Romanian title: Noiembrie)
