= Carpa García =

Mexican American circus show

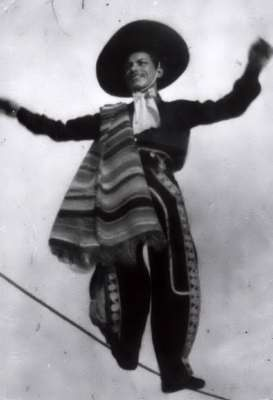
Pilár García on the high wire

La Carpa García, known in English as the García Brothers Show, was a Mexican American carpa (travelling circus tent show) that was active from 1914 – 1947. Carpa García consisted of performers from several families, including Manuel V. and Teresa García, Manolo and Florinda García, Raymond and Virginia García, Rodolfo García, Consuelo and Pilár García, Esther García Robinson, Esperanza, (who died at a very young age from a fall while performing an acrobatic act), and Aida García Castro and husband, Alfredo. Teresa García also had three talented children, Rafael, Juan, and Gilberta, from her previous marriage.

The Carpa Garcías most famous acts were a comedic routine by the character "Don Fito" and a tightrope performance by Pilár García.

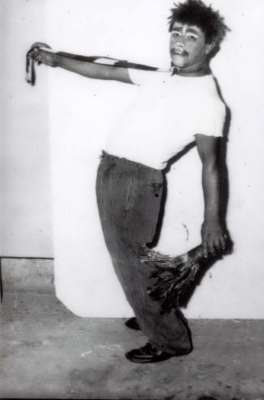
Rodolfo García as Don Fito

The carpa was most active in the Southwestern United States, performing in California, New Mexico, Arizona, and Texas. While there were other Mexican carpas, La Carpa García is historically recognized as one of the more popular and long-standing Mexican tent shows from the first half of the 20th century. It has been mentioned in several scholarly publications was featured prominently at Hertzberg Circus Museum in San Antonio, Texas from 1998 – 2002.

== History ==
The original touring company led by Manuel V. García and his family, began operations in San Antonio in 1914. Manuel and Teresa's children were very active in the circus and all had character roles or dancing parts in the show. Their son, Manolo, was a gifted musician who often served as ringmaster. Another son, Rodolfo, created a popular comedic character, Don Fito, who charmed audiences. Daughters Aida, Consuelo, Gilberta, Esperanza, and Esther, were beautiful and talented ladies who all danced and performed trapeze acts and other acrobatic feats. Others performers participated in popular and traditional dance numbers, contortionist acts, and magic shows. Their spouses and children also performed patriotic songs to rally the crowds during World Wars I and II.

Some members of the troupe also performed with other carpas, including Cubana and Monsiváis, as families became connected through marriage. After La Carpa Garcia disbanded, Rodolfo often portrayed Don Fito for sketches in and around San Antonio with other local comedians such as Pedro Gonzalez-Gonzalez, and Detective Correone. Manolo García became a bandleader and played in nightclubs and events in the city. He later joined other bands such as Sonora Estrella and the San Antonio policeman's band.

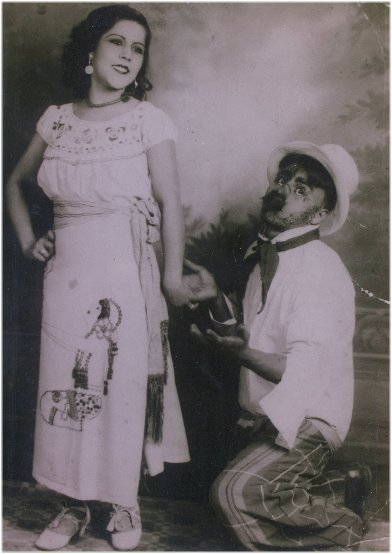
Aida García Castro and brother, Manolo García

The tent shows always incorporated a variety of entertainment including Mexican dances, hand sequined or embroidered costumes and traditional songs. The carpas were also venues for social commentary in the form of comedic sketches. In the late 1940s, at the end of the vaudeville-era traveling show, the carpa members settled in San Antonio, Texas. Family members retired from show business or went on to perform in the Ringling Bros. and Barnum & Bailey Circus and in San Antonio nightclubs and big bands. Others chose to go into education and law enforcement.

== Legacy ==
Artifacts, photos, and stories from La Carpa García were showcased at the Witte Museum in San Antonio during the summer of 2004 and was shown at The Bob Bullock Texas State History Museum in Austin, Texas, in 2006.
