= Cecilia Richards =

Canadian-American mechanical engineer

Cecilia Dianne (Cill) Richards is a retired Canadian and American mechanical engineer, known for her work on small-scale heat engines and on microelectromechanical systems. She is a professor emerita at Washington State University.

== Education and career ==
Richards majored in mathematics at the University of British Columbia, graduating in 1977. After graduation, she began working on solar energy with professors at the university, inspiring her interest in engineering. She continued at the university for a second bachelor's in mechanical engineering in 1981.

While working in industry as an engineer in Vancouver and Southern California from 1981 to 1986, she earned a master's degree in mechanical engineering through the University of British Columbia in 1985. Next, she entered doctoral study at the University of California, Irvine, completing her doctorate in 1990, under the supervision of Scott Samuelsen. She became the first woman to earn a doctorate in mechanical engineering there.

After postdoctoral research at the National Institute of Standards and Technology, Richards joined the Washington State University faculty as an assistant professor of mechanical and materials engineering in 1992. She was tenured as an associate professor in 1998 and promoted to full professor in 2005.

== Recognition ==
Richards was named as an ASME Fellow in 2014. In 2022 the Henry Samueli School of Engineering at the University of California, Irvine named her to its alumni hall of fame.
