= Psalter (Bamberg, Staatsbibliothek, MS A. I. 14) =

Bamberg State Library, Msc.Bibl.44 is an early 10th century Psalter made for Salomo III, the Abbot of St. Gall in 909. The Psalter has parallel texts with texts in two Latin versions, a Hebrew version, and a Greek version. In 972, the future Otto II when he, at the age of about seventeen, visited the monastery with his father, Otto I, had found a locked chest in the Abbey treasury, which he had demanded opened. When he found that it was full of manuscripts, he took those manuscripts he found interesting, including this one. Although many of the manuscripts were later returned, this one apparently was not.
