= Latin Flavors =

Frozen food manufacturer

- Company type: Private
- Industry: Wholesale frozen bakery manufacturer
- Genre: Cuban, Dominican, Puerto Rican, South American cuisine
- Founded: Miami, Florida, 2003
- Headquarters: Miami-Dade County, Florida, United States
- Website: http://www.latin-flavors.com

Latin Flavors is a Hispanic manufacturer of frozen foods sold throughout the United States, Latin America and the Caribbean, with headquarters in unincorporated Miami-Dade County, Florida. The primary product lines are pastries and breads formulated from Cuban, Puerto Rican, Caribbean and South American flavors and recipes.

Latin Flavors began in Cuba in 1921 when Valentin Garcia, of Spanish descent, and his brothers started their first bakery. They grew steadily and, in 1956, inaugurated a new facility and renamed the bakery La Gran Via in Havana, Cuba. The bakery continued to grow very rapidly, establishing a reputation as the best bakery in Cuba until the political differences in 1960 forced the family to abandon the business.

== Manufacturing ==
Latin Flavors produces a wide variety of pastries including Argentinean empanadas, Cuban pastries, Dominican pastries, Jamaican patties, Puerto Rican pastries and breads from South America and the Caribbean. Distribution is by independent and national wholesale distributors. The company also does custom manufacturing, currently private-labeling for several large national companies. Manufacturing at the plant is overseen by U.S. Department of Agriculture and U.S. Food and Drug Administration while adhering to Six Sigma manufacturing practices and methodologies.

== Company news ==
Latin Flavors was selected to support the friendly wager between the senators from Florida and Pennsylvania following the 2008 MLB World Series by providing Cuban pastries

== See also ==
- Cuban cuisine
- Dominican cuisine
- Puerto Rican cuisine
- South American cuisine
