= Okito box =

The okito box is a cylindrical box fitted to the size of a coin, used to perform coin magic. Invented by Tobias Bamberg, better known by the stage name Okito, who first discovered the effect using a pill box for indigestion tablets. In effect, one or more coins placed in the box seems to vanish, appear and penetrate the box. This is used to achieve tricks such as "Coin Through the Box and Hand" as well as "Okito box, Coin and Handkerchief", in which a signed coin transports from the box into the knot of a handkerchief.
