= The Spectre of the Bride =

1943 film

- Directed by: René Cardona
- Written by: David T. Bamberg; René Cardona; Agustín J. Fink; Xavier Villaurrutia
- Produced by: Felipe Subervielle
- Starring: David T. Bamberg; Narciso Busquets; Mimí Derba
- Cinematography: Gabriel Figueroa
- Edited by: Jorge Bustos
- Music by: Manuel Esperón
- Production company: Films Mundiales
- Release date: 2 September 1943
- Running time: 91 minutes
- Country: Mexico
- Language: Spanish

The Spectre of the Bride (Spanish:El espectro de la novia) is a 1943 Mexican mystery film directed and co-written by René Cardona and starring David T. Bamberg, Narciso Busquets and Mimí Derba.

== Cast ==
- Julio Ahuet
- David T. Bamberg as Fu Manchu
- Narciso Busquets as Juanito
- Mimí Derba
- Cuquita Escobar
- Josefina Escobedo
- Miguel Ángel Ferriz
- Manuel Medel as Satanás
- José Pidal
- Ángel T. Sala
- Agustín Sen
- Hernán Vera

== Bibliography ==
- Cotter, Bob. The Mexican Masked Wrestler and Monster Filmography. McFarland & Company, 2005.
