= Tobias Bamberg =

Professional magician

- 1910 poster showing Okito performing the floating ball trick
- Born: Tobias Leendert Bamberg; 1875
- Died: 1963 (aged 87–88)
- Other name: Okito
- Children: David Bamberg
- Parent(s): David Tobias Bamberg; Judic Simon Delden

Tobias "Theo" Leendert Bamberg (1875–1963) was a professional magician. Born in the Netherlands, Bamberg performed under the name Okito which is an anagram of Tokio (Tokyo). His father had been court magician to King William III of the Netherlands, making Okito the sixth generation in a family of outstanding magicians known as the Bamberg Magical Dynasty.

== Early life ==
Bamberg was the son of Judic Simon Delden and David Tobias Bamberg. His family were Dutch Jews. As a young boy, Theo Bamberg nearly drowned while ice skating. The accident left him almost completely deaf and as a result, he performed entirely in pantomime. As a young man, inspired by a performance of the great French magician, shadowist and mimic Felecien Trewey, Bamberg developed a shadowgraphy routine which he performed professionally, beginning in his early teens.

== Early career ==
In 1893, Bamberg created his first Japanese-style act in Berlin at the age of eighteen. Success was virtually immediate, but he eventually abandoned the show to elope with the theater manager's daughter. Shortly after, his new wife convinced him to change his name from "Tobias/Toby" to "Theodore/Theo". When he returned to performing, Bamberg altered his Japanese act to become a Chinese-style act to better facilitate a new illusion he had designed. Unlike William Ellsworth Robinson who performed as Chung Ling Soo, Bamberg didn't make an attempt to hide his European identity.

February 1907 brought the birth of his son David Bamberg (who would later perform under the stage name Fu Manchu) in England. Bamberg and his family eventually moved to the United States where, beginning in 1908, Okito worked as an off-stage assistant/advisor and on-stage feature in the shows of illusionist Howard Thurston. On the Thurston show, he was billed as "Europe's Greatest Shadowist."

== Later career ==
In 1909, through SAM, Bamberg had become friends with other notable magicians including Clement de Lion, Nate Leipzig, and many others. Frustrated with his lack of success, Theo sold his Okito act to a Brooklyn magician and plumbing contractor, W.J. "Doc" Nixon. It was in that year that Bamberg opened, with partner Joe Klein, the Bamberg Magic & Novelty Co. in New York City. The company was the primary representative of the German firm of Carl Willmann. While minding the store and toying with a pillbox, Bamberg invented his famous Okito box used to perform coin magic. Eventually, Bamberg returned to the road (playing vaudeville and variety theatres), selling his interest in the shop to Klein. Bamberg's skills were such that existing handmade props created by Bamberg are highly prized by collectors today. Many of Okito's props were described by Robert Albo in his Classic Magic with Apparatus and The Ultimate Okito series.

Eventually, Doc Nixon gave Theo the "Okito" title back. Discarding the old act, Okito built many larger effects that would make him into a legend. When he returned to Europe, success finally found him. He traveled the world working large prestigious contracts. He was reunited with his son David and made him his assistant like his father did and his father's father as well.

Following a South American and European tour in 1932, Theo decided to settle down and he returned to the Netherlands. Meanwhile, David had established himself in South America and persuaded his father to come and visit him. Okito did so just as the Nazis invaded Belgium and the Netherlands. As a result, all of his possessions were either confiscated or destroyed. Theo Bamberg, known as Okito and frequently billed on posters as The Mystic ended his last years in Chicago where he won the friendship, respect and admiration of everyone interested in magic. and died in 1963.

Squash Publishing is scheduled to release an anthology of selected Okito tricks, illusions, reminiscences and his never-before-published hand shadow routine.

== Works ==
- Okito (1921). Quality Magic. Will Goldston Ltd.
- Okito; Parrish, Robert (1952). Okito on Magic. Edward O. Drane.
