= The Museum of Crime =

- Directed by: René Cardona
- Written by: David T. Bamberg; René Cardona; Ramón Pérez Peláez
- Produced by: René Cardona; José Sotomayor
- Starring: David T. Bamberg; Pituka de Foronda; Ricardo Mondragón
- Cinematography: José Ortiz Ramos
- Edited by: Juan José Marino
- Music by: Jorge Pérez
- Production company: Astro Films Mundiales
- Release date: 20 December 1945
- Running time: 84 minutes
- Country: Mexico
- Language: Spanish

The Museum of Crime (Spanish: El museo del crimen) is a 1945 Mexican mystery film directed by René Cardona and starring David T. Bamberg, Pituka de Foronda and Ricardo Mondragón. It was one of a six-film series featuring Bamberg as Fu Manchu (four of which were directed by Cardona).

== Cast ==
- David T. Bamberg as Fu Manchu
- Pituka de Foronda as Margarita Palacios
- Ricardo Mondragon as Dr. Busquet
- Emma Roldán as Enfermera
- Ramón Vallarino as Manuel Ramos
- Katy Jurado as Sara Ramos
- Ángel T. Sala as Palomino
- Cuquita Escobar as Cuca
- Rafael Icardo as Belcebú
- Octavio Martinez as Dr. Andrade
- Conchita Gentil Arcos as Clementina Cardoso de Ramos
- José Morcillo as Vendedor
- Fernando Curiel as Dr. Antonio Osorio
- Carlos Villarías as Detective
- Enriqueta Reza as Sirvienta
- Ernesto Monato as Dr. Villanueva
- José Escanero as Manegador de hotel
- Humberto Rodríguez as Examinador médico

== Bibliography ==
- Cotter, Bob. The Mexican Masked Wrestler and Monster Filmography. McFarland & Company, 2005.
