= Heinrich von Bamberger =

Austrian pathologist (1822–1888)

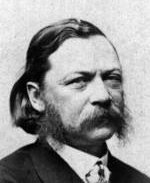
Heinrich von Bamberger

Heinrich von Bamberger (27 December 1822, Zwornarka, Kingdom of Bohemia – 9 November 1888, Vienna) was an Austrian pathologist. He was father to internist Eugen von Bamberger (1858-1921).

== Biography ==
In 1847, he earned his doctorate from the University of Prague, and from 1851 to 1854 was a clinical assistant to Johann von Oppolzer (1808–1871) in Vienna. In 1854, he became professor of therapeutic pathology at the University of Würzburg, returning to the University of Vienna in 1872, where he succeeded Oppolzer as professor of special pathology and therapy. Among his assistants in Vienna was internist Edmund von Neusser (1852–1912).

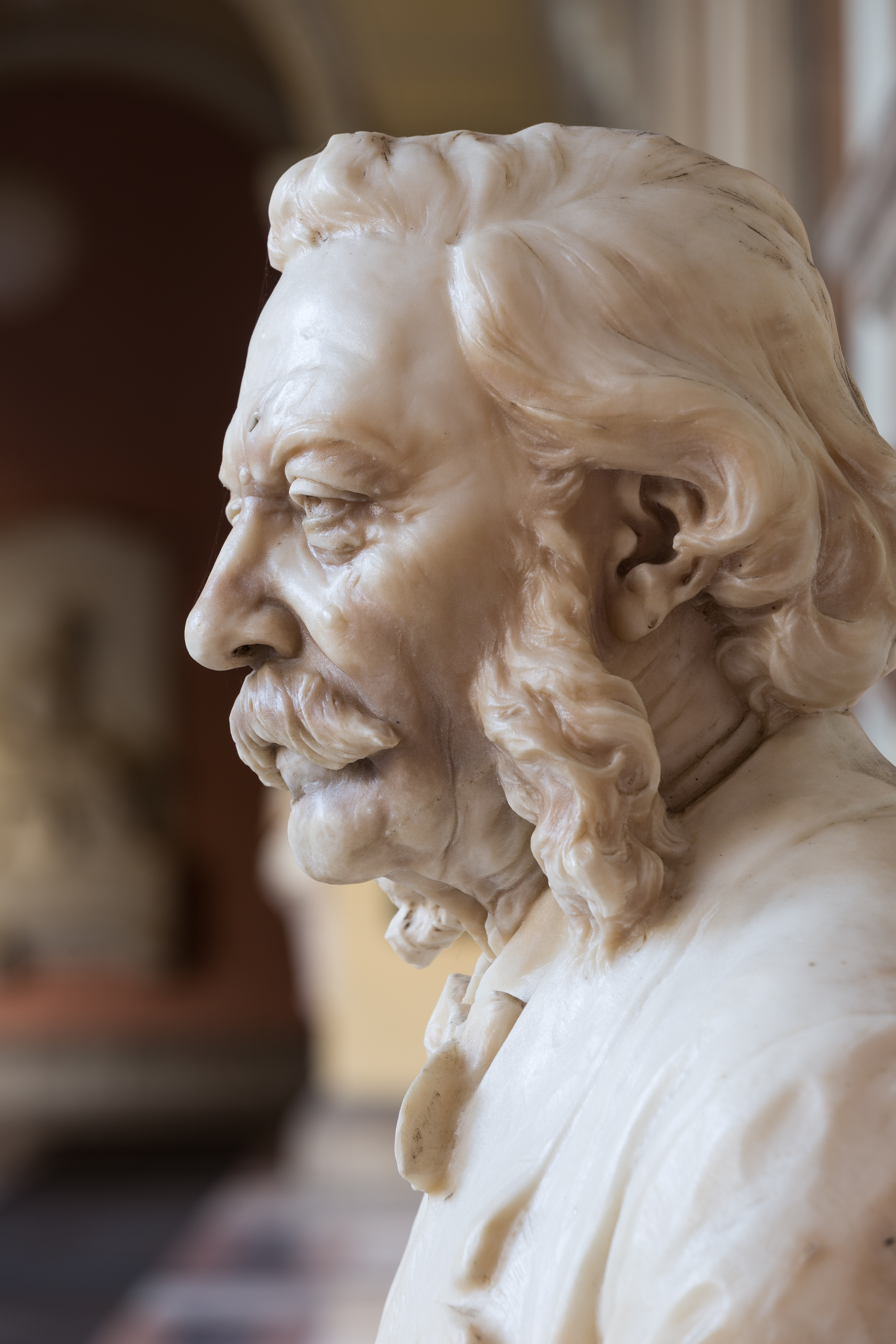
Bust of Bamberger in the Arkadenhof of the University of Vienna

Bamberger was a specialist in respiratory and circulatory pathology, remembered for his research involving diseases of the pericardium, heart tissues, and the larger vessels. He provided early descriptions of hematogenous albuminuria, uremic pericarditis and progressive polyserositis. The eponymous "Bamberger's disease" is named after him, characterized by spasmodic affections of the leg muscles.

In 1857, he published Lehrbuch der Krankheiten des Herzens (Handbook of diseases of the heart), one of the first textbooks dedicated to cardiac pathology. Another of his publications of note was Die Krankheiten des chylopoetischen Systems (On the diseases of the chylopoietic system, 1855).

== See also ==
- Pathology
- List of pathologists
