= Manuel Medel =

Mexican film actor and comedian

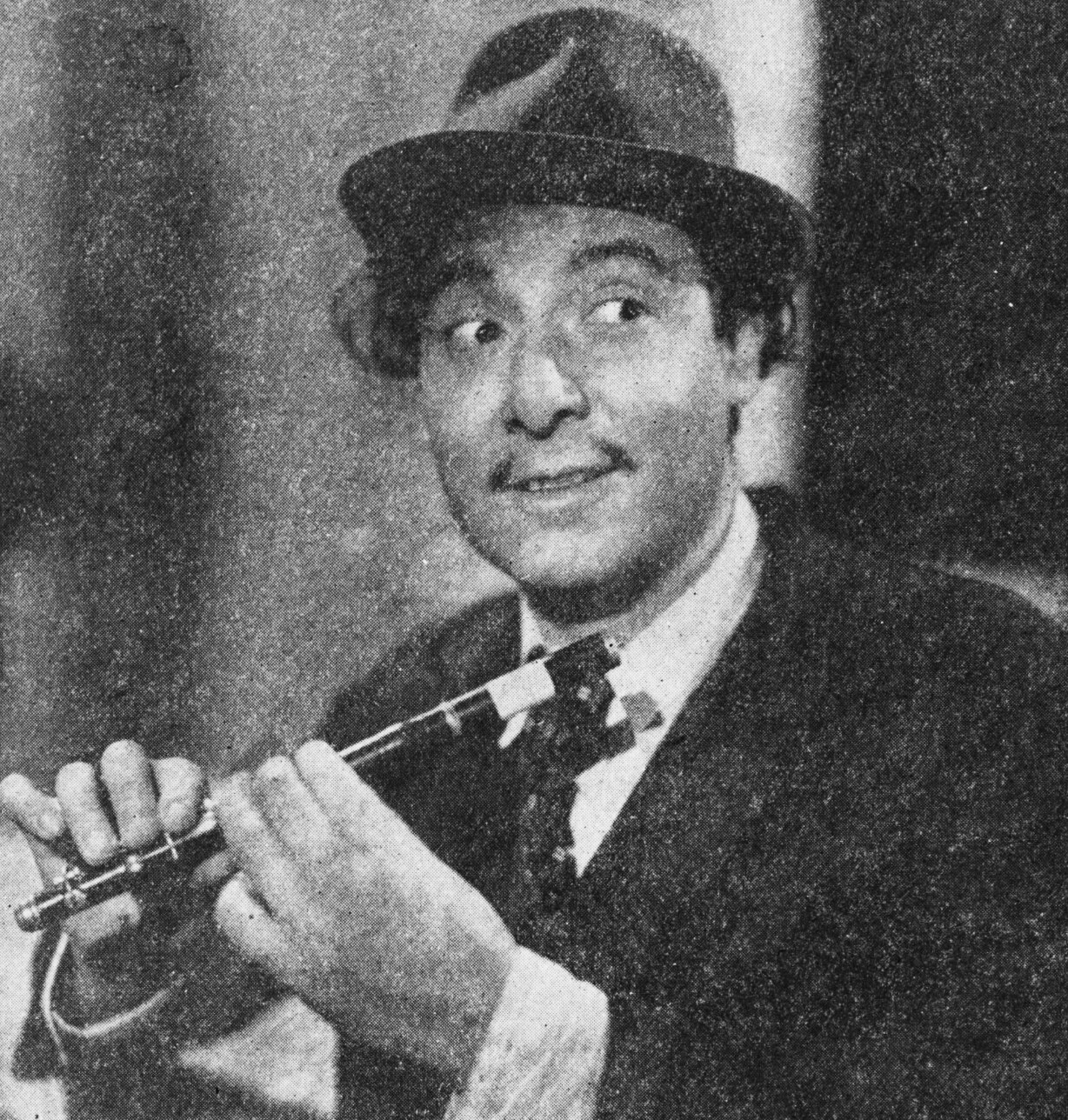
- Medel in 1945
- Born: 5 January 1906; Monterrey, Mexico
- Died: 14 March 1997 (aged 91); Mexico City, Mexico
- Occupation: Actor
- Years active: 1934 - 1986 (film)

Manuel Medel (1906 – 1997) was a Mexican film actor and comedian. During the late 1930s he teamed up with the rising star Cantinflas for three films.

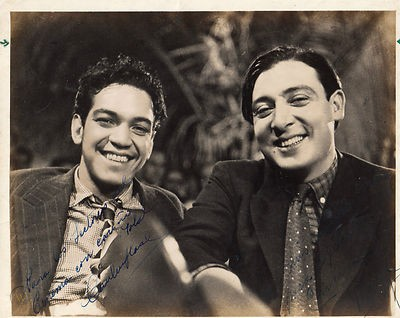
Manuel Medel and Cantinflas, circa 1938

== Selected filmography ==
- Such Is My Country (1937)
- Heads or Tails (1937)
- The Sign of Death (1939)
- The Spectre of the Bride (1943)
- The Headless Woman (1944)
- The Black Ace (1946)
- La vida inútil de Pito Pérez, The Useless Life of Pito Perez (1944)
- Madman and Vagabond (1946)

== Bibliography ==
- Mraz, John. Looking for Mexico: Modern Visual Culture and National Identity. Duke University Press, 2010.
