= National cinema =

Films associated with a nation-state

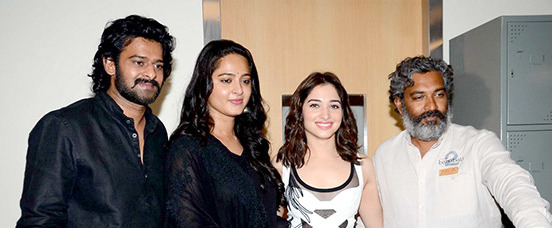
The Indian film industry produces movies in over 18 languages and sells more tickets than any other country in the world.

National cinema is a term sometimes used in film theory and film criticism to describe the films associated with a specific nation-state. Although there is little relatively written on theories of national cinema it has an irrefutably important role in globalization. Film provides a unique window to other cultures, particularly where the output of a nation or region is high.

== Definition ==
Like other film theory or film criticism terms (e.g., "art film"), the term "national cinema" is hard to define, and its meaning is debated by film scholars and critics. A film may be considered to be part of a "national cinema" based on a number of factors. Simply put, a "nation's cinema" can be attributed to the country that provided the financing for the film, the language spoken in the film, the nationalities or dress of the characters, and the setting, music, or cultural elements present in the film. To define a national cinema, some scholars emphasize the structure of the film industry and the roles played by "...market forces, government support, and cultural transfers..." More theoretically, national cinema can refer to a large group of films, or "a body of textuality... given historical weight through common intertextual 'symptoms', or coherencies". In Theorising National Cinema, Philip Rosen suggests national cinema is a conceptualization of: (1) Selected 'national' films/texts themselves, the relationship between them, which be connected by a shared (general) symptom. (2) an understanding of the 'nation' as an entity in synchronicity with its 'symptom'. And (3) an understanding of past or traditional 'symptoms', also known as history or historiography, which contribute to current systems and 'symptoms'. These symptoms of intertextuality could refer to style, medium, content, narrative, narrative structure, costume, Mise-en-scène, character, background, cinematography. It could refer to cultural background of those who make the movie and cultural background of those in the movie, of spectatorship, of spectacle.

== Canada ==
Canadian cultural and film critics have long debated how Canadian national cinema can be defined, or whether there is a Canadian national cinema. Most of the films shown on Canadian movie screens are US imports. If "Canadian national cinema" is defined as the films made in Canada, then the canon of Canadian cinema would have to include lightweight teen-oriented fare such as Meatballs (1979), Porky's (1981) or Death Ship (1980). Other critics have defined Canadian national cinema as a "...reflection of Canadian life and culture." Some critics argue that there are "two traditions of filmmaking in Canada": The "documentary realist tradition" espoused by the federal government's National Film Board and avant-garde films.

Scott MacKenzie argues that by the late 1990s, if Canada did have a popular cinema with both avant-garde and experimental elements, that was influenced by European filmmakers such as Jean-Luc Godard and Wim Wenders. MacKenzie argues that Canadian cinema has a "...self-conscious concern with the incorporation of cinematic and televisual images", and as examples, he cites films such as David Cronenberg's Videodrome (1983), Atom Egoyan's Family Viewing (1987), Robert Lepage's The Confessional (Le Confessionnal) (1995) and Srinivas Krishna's Masala (1991).

== France ==
- See French New Wave and cinema du look

France's national cinema includes both popular cinema and "avant-garde" films. French national cinema is associated with the auteur filmmakers and with a variety of specific movements. Avant-garde filmmakers include Germaine Dulac, Marie and Jean Epstein. Poetic Realism filmmakers include Jean Renoir and Marcel Carné. The French New Wave filmmakers include Jean-Luc Godard and François Truffaut. The 1990s and 2000s "postmodern cinema" of France includes filmmakers such as Jean-Jacques Beinex, Luc Besson and Coline Serreau.

== Germany ==
- See German New Wave

During the German Weimar Republic, German national cinema was influenced by silent and sound "Bergfilm" (this translates to "mountain film"). During the 1920s and early 1930s, German national cinema was known for the progressive and artistic approaches to filmmaking with "shifted conventional cinematic vocabulary" and which gave actresses a much larger range of character-types. During the Nazi era, the major film studio UFA was controlled by Propaganda Minister Goebbels. UFA produced "Hetzfilme" (anti-Semitic hate films) and films which emphasized the "theme of heroic death." Other film genres produced by UFA during the Nazi era included historical and biographical dramas that emphasized the achievements in German history, comedy films, and propaganda films.

During the Cold War from the 1950s through the 1980s, there were West German films and East German films. Film historians and film scholars do not agree whether the films from the different parts of Cold War-era Germany can be considered to be a single "German national cinema." Some West German films were about the "immediate past in sociopolitical thought and in literature". East German films were often Soviet-funded "socially critical" films. Some East German films examined Germany's Nazi past, such as Wolfgang Staudte's Die Mörder sind unter uns (The Murderers Are Among Us).

The New German Cinema of the 1970s and 1980s included films by directors such as Fassbinder, Herzog, and Wim Wenders. While these directors made films with "many ideological and cinematic messages", they all shared the common element of providing an "aesthetic alternativ(e) to Hollywood" films (even though Fassbinder was influenced by the works of Douglas Sirk) and "a break with the cultural and political traditions associated with the Third Reich"(159).

== Poland ==
After World War II, the Lódz Film School was founded in 1948. During the 1950s and 1960s, a "Polish School of Film" of filmmakers developed, such as Wojciech Has, Kazimierz Kutz, Andrzej Munk and Andrzej Wajda. According to film scholar Marek Haltof, the Polish School made films which can be described as the "Cinema of Distrust". In the late 1970s and early 1980s, Wajda, Krzysztof Zanussi and Barbara Sass made influential films which garnered interest outside of Poland. However, even though Western countries became increasingly interested in Polish cinema during this period, the country's film infrastructure and market was disintegrating.

== Mexico ==
- See Nuevo Cine Mexicano

Although it is difficult to determine and define a 'national cinema', much of what many consider Mexican national cinema, but not limited to, is Golden Age of Mexican Cinema and films that revolve around the Mexican Revolution. Unique trajectories of Mexican cinema's development shaped historically specific understandings of the ontology of the moving image, leading to unique configurations of documentation and fictionalization. The Revolution spilled across pages of the press, and became the primary subject of Mexican films produced between 1911 and 1916. There was a high interest in topicality in and capturing current events as they unfolded, re-staging, or combining both approaching, created a sensationalist appeal in these visual 'records' of death and injury. Compilation documentaries, such as Toscano's Memorias de un Mexicano in the years following the Mexican Revolution can be seen as part of a broader cultural politics of nationalism that worked to naturalize and to consolidate the political and ideological story of the revolution.

Later narrativized dramas, such as María Candelaria, The Pearl, Enamorada, Rio Escondido, Saián Mexico, or Pueblerina by Emilio Fernandez and/or Gabriel Figueroa, are often considered part of the Mexican national cinematic body. These films, and most popular films of the 1920s in Mexico, adopted David Bordwell's "cinematic norms": narrative linkage, cause and effect, goal oriented protagonists, temporal order or cinematic time, and filmic space as story space. But also, is noted to have incorporated visual folkloric style of José Guadalupe Posada, the deconstructing landscapes of Gerardo Murillo, and the low angles, deep focus, diagonal lines, and 'native' imagery in Sergei Eisenstein's Que Viva Mexico. Although a mélange of Western and Mexican influences coexist in Fernandez's films, his Mexican biography and locality leave a legacy of romanticizing Mexico and Mexican history, often presenting idyllic ranches, singing, and a charming life of the poor.

Although of European heritage, Luis Buñuel's work in Mexico is another example that presents 'symptoms' of Mexican national identity. Although less well received by lower classes, and more admired by upper classes, Buñuel's Los Olvidados (1950) stands as an example that a director's national heritage doesn't always have to contribute to the conceptualization of a nation's cinema. Rather than building the nation through celebration, the film presents problem, which contribute to a global identity and context of the nation state. Buñuel, however, is less interested in presenting some 'identity' of message, national or international, and remarked that "to ask whether the film is Mexican or not, is to resist, to seek, to disperse, the very mystery this film articulates for us".

Modern genres embraced and nurtured as 'Mexican national cinema' are often those of the social and family melodrama genre (the Golden Globe nominated Como agua para chocolate (1991) by Alfonso Arau), the working class melodrama (Danzon (1991) by Maria Novaro), the comedy (Sólo con tu pareja (1991) by Alfonso Cuarón) and the rural costumbrismo film (La mujer de Benjamin (1990) by Carlos Carrera). Changes in the politics of film industry institutions allowed these film texts and their directors to "transform the traditional filmic paradigm". Up to 60% of financial assistance for national, Latin American, and European productions were provided by the Instituto Mexicano de Cinematografia, new models of co-production were created, and distribution and sales channels were opened abroad.

== In other countries ==
Countries like South Korea and Iran have over the years produced a large body of critically acclaimed and award-winning films by the likes of Oscar winner Bong Joon-ho and the late Abbas Kiarostami.

== See also ==
- Musical nationalism
- Third World Cinema
- Cinephilia
- Transnational cinema
