= Un día de vida =

1950 melodrama film by Emilio Fernández

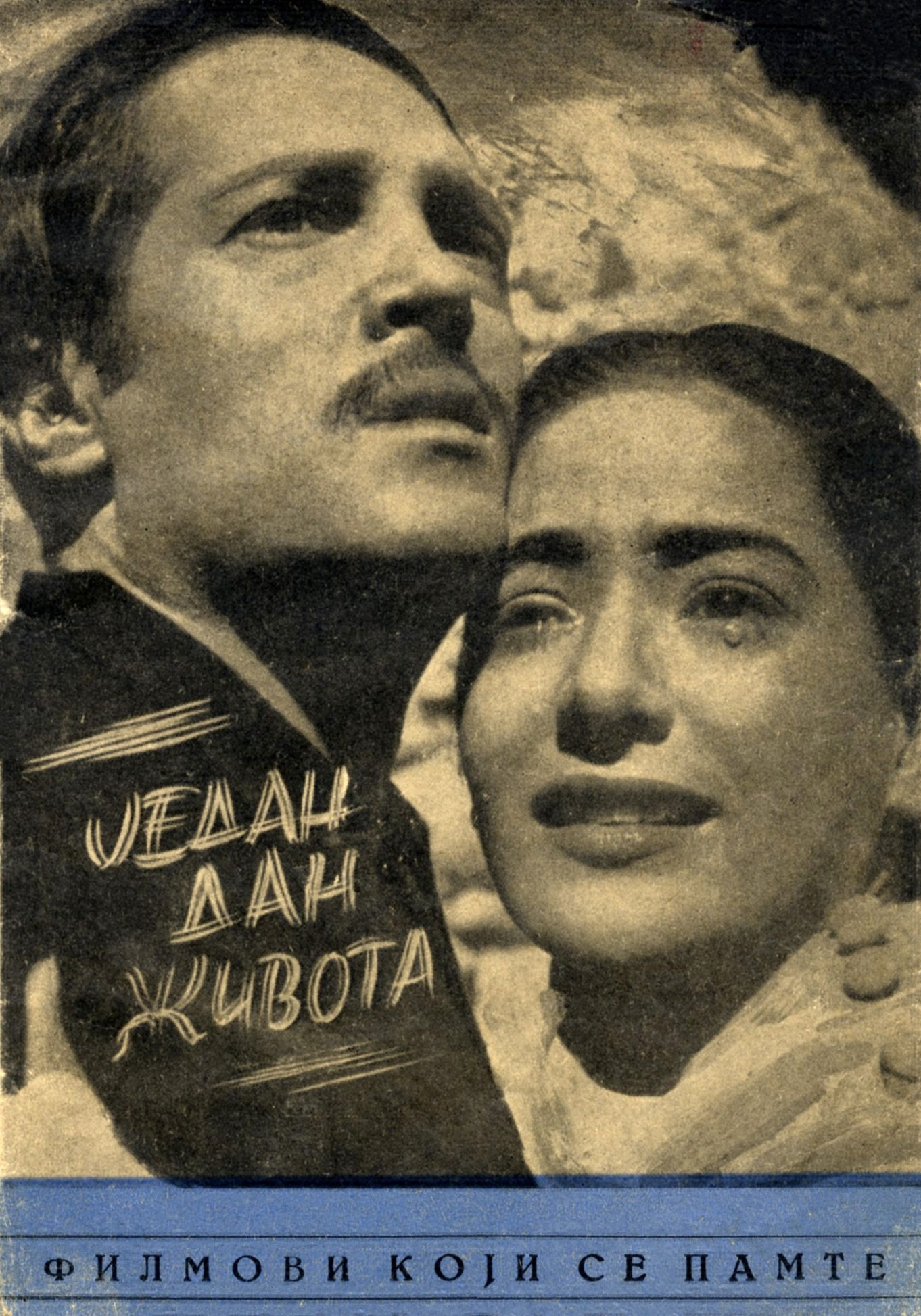
- Promotional pamphlet for the Yugoslav release
- Directed by: Emilio Fernández
- Screenplay by: Emilio Fernández; Mauricio Magdaleno
- Story by: Emilio Fernández
- Produced by: Alberto Ferrer
- Starring: Columba Domínguez; Roberto Cañedo
- Cinematography: Gabriel Figueroa
- Edited by: Gloria Schoemann
- Music by: Antonio Díaz Conde (composer); Fernando Fernández (singer)
- Production company: Cabrera Films
- Release date: November 11, 1950
- Running time: 97 minutes
- Country: Mexico
- Language: Spanish

Un día de vida (transl. One Day of Life) is a 1950 Mexican melodrama film directed by Emilio Fernández. Set during the Mexican Revolution, it stars Columba Domínguez as Belén Martí, a Cuban journalist, and Roberto Cañedo as Colonel Lucio Reyes, a Mexican military officer sentenced to death.

Fernández reunited many of the actors and much of the production team that had helped his films earn international success in the preceding years. Nevertheless, its domestic reception in Mexico, as well as elsewhere in Latin America, was poor. The film was nominated for only one Premio Ariel, the last any Fernández film would receive until 1975. It is considered a marginal work within the context of Mexican film history.

Circumstances resulting from the Tito–Stalin split, however, led to its late 1952 release in Yugoslavia as Jedan dan života (Serbo-Croatian Cyrillic: Један дан живота, transl. One Day of Life), where it became one of the most successful films of the era. By 1953, it was estimated that half of Belgrade's citizens had seen the film. According to Politika Ekspres, it was "the most watched film in Yugoslavia in the last fifty years". Its success led to the rise of Yu-Mex and it later became identified with the Yugo-nostalgia that resulted from the breakup of Yugoslavia in 1992.

== Synopsis ==
Belén Martí (Columba Domínguez), a journalist from Cuba, ventures on her own to Mexico in order to investigate and write about the Mexican Revolution then underway. She learns upon arriving that a revolutionary officer, Colonel Lucio Reyes (Roberto Cañedo), has been convicted of treason and sentenced to execution by firing squad for leading an armed revolt that protested the assassination of Emiliano Zapata. Reyes' childhood friend, General Felipe Gómez (Fernando Fernández), has been tasked with carrying out the sentence.

Martí idealizes Reyes as a hero fated to become a martyr for the Revolution. Her initial requests to meet with Reyes are rebuffed by his jailers, but she is permitted to send him a gift of Cuban cigars. Receiving these, Reyes reflects on the personal and cultural ties between the peoples of Mexico and Cuba.

Unable to meet Reyes, Martí travels to meet his mother, Mamá Juanita (Rosaura Revueltas), who lives in the village of Cieneguillas, near the ruins of Teotihuacán. Unaware of her son's fate, whom she expects to see the next morning to celebrate her feast day, she invites Martí to spend the night at her home, whom she compliments as a woman worthy of her son's affection. Martí, discomfited by the guilt she feels for knowing about Reyes' fate, refuses her offer.

The next day, while the village prepares for Mamá Juanita's feast day, a local band begins to play "Las mañanitas". Martí worries in anticipation of the moment when Mamá Juanita learns the truth about her son, but the old lady remains undaunted in her belief that he will come. Unexpectedly, Reyes arrives in the company of Gómez, who had conceded the visit as a last request to his friend, as well as a token of his own love for Mamá Juanita. "Las mañanitas" is played again and the mood turns celebratory. Martí is anguished by the truth, however, and rushes out to weep out of Mamá Juanita's sight.

Reyes becomes enthralled by Martí, whose surname reminds him of José Martí. A mutual romance develops. Martí pleads with Reyes and Gómez to devise a plan of escape, but the former refuses for fear of inadvertently making the townspeople complicit in the crime. The rejoicing continues, while Martí despairs. Then, at the end of the party, Mamá Juanita discloses to Martí that she had known about her son's sentence all along. The next day Reyes is executed. Mamá Juanita holds his body in her arms in the manner of a "mater dolorosa", while Martí and Gómez approach from behind.

== Cast ==
Starring cast is:

- Columba Domínguez as Belén Martí
- Roberto Cañedo as Colonel Lucio Reyes

Supporting cast includes:

- Fernando Fernández as General Felipe Gómez
- Rosaura Revueltas as Mamá Juanita
- Eduardo Arozamena as Pomposo
- Julio Villarreal as Manuel Ignacio Landa y Márquez del Toro Bravo
- Arturo Soto Rangel
- José Torvay as Don Manuel, schoolmaster
- Jaime Fernández as the lieutenant
- Agustín Fernández
- Salvador Quiroz

== Production ==
The filming of Un día de vida followed in the wake of a series of popular and critical successes for director Emilio Fernández and his production team. His 1943 film María Candelaria was awarded "Best Cinematography" at the 1946 Cannes Film Festival. His films had also been nominated at home for the Premio Ariel five consecutive times between 1946 and 1950 in the "Best Film" and "Best Director" categories, winning three times in the latter. For the production of Un día de vida, Fernández reassembled the team of artists that had brought him success in the past. He cast in the leads Columba Domínguez, his wife, and Roberto Cañedo, both of whom had been Premio Ariel winners in 1949 and 1950 respectively.

== Reception ==
=== Mexico ===
As a melodrama that combines themes of patriotism, family, and romance, Un día de vida is considered a typical product of the Golden Age of Mexican Cinema. Emilio Fernández, aided by Gabriel Figueroa's cinematography, created in the film an idealization of reality that depicted Mexico as both new and ancient, and Mexicans as a proud and humble people. The film also included elements of anti-imperialism and Hispanic American unity.

Nevertheless, interest in Fernández's films had dissipated by the time of the domestic release of Un día de vida on November 11, 1950. The film fared poorly in Mexico. Its only Premio Ariel nomination was in the "Best Actress" category for Rosaura Revueltas, which she lost. It was the last nomination that any of Fernández's films would receive until La Choca was nominated for and won "Best Director" and "Best Picture" at the XVII Premios Ariel in 1974. Un día de vida was subsequently released in the rest of Latin America, where it also failed to gain wider attention. The film has since been relegated to the margins of Mexican film history.

=== Yugoslavia ===
In the years immediately after World War II, a power struggle that erupted within the Eastern Bloc between the Soviet Union and Yugoslavia ultimately led to the Tito–Stalin split in 1948. With Soviet films no longer acceptable, Yugoslav authorities began importing films from elsewhere. American films were not considered as acceptable alternatives due to their perceived imperialism. According to Miha Mazzini, Yugoslav authorities found Mexican films to be ideologically suitable because they were non-threatening, but "talked about revolution in the highest terms".

Un día de vida was released in Yugoslavia as Jedan dan života (Serbo-Croatian Cyrillic: Један дан живота) in late 1952. It was among the first Mexican films screened in the country. By 1953, it was the most popular film in Yugoslavia, with over 250,000 tickets sold. Within two years of its release, it broke local records for viewership. As many as one in two people in Belgrade saw the film. Audiences became especially emotional when Reyes sings "Las mañanitas" to his mother, a scene that was later reported to have "made all of Yugoslavia cry". Aleksandar Vučo wrote in his review that "never before had a film provoked so many tears". Another writer, Voja Rehar, said:

Through Un día de vida, Mexico surrendered itself, said everything about itself. It spoke of its history and foresaw its future, it showed us its heart—we saw it and felt it. It was the first time when upon seeing Mexico, I thought of Yugoslavia. Perhaps there was a subconscious feeling of connection, perhaps the familiarity of the hearts and characters. Their songs and dances resembled ours, their country to ours, their people to ours.

Eventually Un día de vida became considered a classic of Yugoslav cinema. Politika Ekspres declared it to be "the most watched film in Yugoslavia in the last fifty years". Yugoslav distributors continued to renew their rights to the film, reviving the film at regular intervals for the next 20 years. As late as 2010, a theatre in Sarajevo was still playing the film. It was later also regularly broadcast on television in Yugoslavia and its successor states. Mazzini wrote:

Emilio Fernández's Un día de vida became so immensely popular that the old people in the former republics of Yugoslavia even today regard it as surely one of the most well known films in the world ever made; although, in truth, it is probably unknown in every other country.

The film's success led to the Yu-Mex boom of the 1950s and 1960s, wherein Yugoslav musicians performed music in the style of Mexican canción ranchera. It also popularized the song "Las mañanitas", which in Yugoslavia was renamed "Mama Huanita". Beginning in the late 20th century, after the breakup of Yugoslavia, the film and its music also became identified with Yugo-nostalgia.

Columba Domínguez attended a gala screening of Un día de vida at the Yugoslav Film Archive in Belgrade in 1997, after decades of receiving letters from Yugoslav admirers. The event was preceded by a live performance by Slavko Perović of the song "Mama Huanita".

== Awards ==
Award	Date of ceremony	Category	Recipients	Result
Ariel Awards	1950	Best Supporting Actress	Rosaura Revueltas	Nominated
