= Gabriel Figueroa =

Mexican cinematographer (1907–1997)

- Born: Gabriel Figueroa Mateos; April 24, 1907; Mexico City, Mexico
- Died: April 27, 1997 (aged 90); Mexico City, Mexico
- Education: Academy of San Carlos; Conservatorio Nacional de Música
- Occupations: Cinematographer, photographer
- Years active: 1932-1986
- Relatives: Adolfo López Mateos (cousin)
- Website: www.gabrielfigueroa.com

Gabriel Figueroa Mateos (April 24, 1907 – April 27, 1997) was a Mexican cinematographer, regarded as one of the greatest cinematographers of the Golden Age of Mexican cinema. He worked on over 200 films, which cover a broad range of genres, and is best known for his technical dominance, his careful handling of framing and chiaroscuro, and affinity for the aesthetics of artists.

Figueroa won nine Ariel Awards for his motion picture photography, and the Golden Ariel for Lifetime Achievement in 1987. He was also nominated for an Academy Award for his work on John Huston's The Night of the Iguana (1965). He also won Best Cinematography accolades at the Cannes and Venice film festivals, and received the American Society of Cinematographers' International Award in 1995.

== Early years ==
Born in 1907, Figueroa grew up in Mexico City, where he studied painting at the Academy of San Carlos, and violin at the National Conservatory. He was the grandson of the famous lawyer, journalist and liberal writer Juan A. Mateos and first cousin to Mexican president Adolfo Lopez Mateos. His mother died after giving birth to him and his father, unable to cope with the loss of his wife, left Gabriel and his brother Roberto to be cared for by their aunts. He then fled to Paris, where he eventually succumbed to alcohol and despair. When the family fortune ran dry, Figueroa "had to leave the Academy and go into the darkroom to make a living".

He first started learning photography, which became his source of income, with Lalo Guerrero. He worked in a studio on Colonia Guerrero, where people would get their pictures taken with painted curtains in the background and under natural light. Towards the end of the 1920s, Figueroa went on to work with photographers Juan de la Peña and José Guadalupe Velasco, before establishing his own studio with his friend Gilberto Martínez Solares.

== Career ==
In 1932, thanks to his friend Gilberto, Figueroa met cinematographer Alex Phillips. Convinced by his talent, Phillips managed to start Figueroa's career in the movie industry as a still photographer for the film Revolución (1933), directed by Miguel Contreras Torres. Figueroa and Phillips would continue to work alongside each other on several other films. As a result of marked growth in the field of Mexican film production, in 1933 Figueroa was able to continue and develop his work as a still photographer on at least 9 films, some of them of enormous significance in the history of national cinema. Towards the end of June 1933, Figueroa made his debut as a cinematographer in several shots of the medium-length documentary El vuelo glorioso de Barberán y Collar (1933), directed by René Cardona. And, between October and November, he was one of the camera operators of the multiple sequences filmed for Viva Villa! (1934), directed by Jack Conway. On November 13, 1934, Figueroa would begin working on the film Tribu (La Raza indómita) (1935) with fellow collaborator Miguel Contreras Torres, who Figueroa had his first job as a still photographer in 1932. Tribu marked another milestone in Figueroa's career, as it was the first time he shared credit with his teacher Alex Phillips, in addition to his stillman work.

In 1935, Rico Pani, son of prominent politician Alberto J. Pani, approached Figueroa with a contract to work as a cinematographer for a newly founded production company. To consolidate his knowledge, he obtained from the magnate a scholarship to go study in Hollywood, seeing closely the work of Gregg Toland, then considered one of the best cinematographers in the world. As a student, he saw Toland work on the film Splendor (1935) and learned how to create foreboding shadows and render a melancholy ambiance. Upon arrival, Figueroa checked-in to the famous Roosevelt Hotel from where he called the only person he knew in the city, Charlie Kimball, editor of the movie Maria Elena (1936), of which Figueroa had worked as an illuminator and stillman in February 1935. The call was answered by Gerardo Hanson, producer of Maria Elena, who later took him out to a villa on Vine Street. Figueroa always considered Toland as his teacher. The following year, in 1936, Gabriel returned to Mexico and it was here that he began to produce his distinctive images. His first feature, Allá en el Rancho Grande (1936), which would become one of the most popular films in Mexico and Latin America, and is considered to be the one that started the Golden Age of Mexican cinema, gained international recognition when it won a prize at the Venice Film Festival and broke box-office records.

He filmed 235 movies over 50 years. One of his main collaborators was Emilio Fernández, with whom he shot twenty films, some of which won prizes at the Venice Film Festival, the Cannes Film Festival, and the Berlin Film Festival. After collaborating with Fernández and Luis Buñuel on their films with such actors as Dolores del Río, Pedro Armendáriz, María Félix, Jorge Negrete, Columba Domínguez, and Silvia Pinal. Figueroa has come to be regarded as one of the most influential cinematographers of Mexico.

His Hollywood film credits included John Ford's The Fugitive (1947), John Huston's The Night of the Iguana (1964) and Under the Volcano (1984), Two Mules for Sister Sara (1970), and Kelly's Heroes (also 1970). His work on The Night of the Iguana earned him an Best Cinematography Oscar nomination at the 37th Academy Awards, the first Mexican-born cinematographer to do so.

== Exhibition ==
- 2011: Rencontres d'Arles Festival, France.
- 2013-2014: Los Angeles County Museum of Art, Los Angeles. Detailed retrospective of Figueroa's photography, cinematography, and progressive politics.

The Los Angeles County Museum of Art (LACMA) organized the retrospective exhibition titled "Under the Mexican Sky: Gabriel Figueroa—Art and Film." The exhibit, featuring Figueroa's work from the early 1930s to the early 1980s, included film clips, paintings, photographs, posters and documents both from Figueroa's archive and the Televisa Foundation collections. "Under the Mexican Sky" recognizes Figueroa's contribution to Mexico's Golden Age of Film, both technically, and stylistically. LACMA curators highlight the artist's works across genres that "…helped forge an evocative and enduring image of Mexico." The exhibit ran from September 22, 2013, through February 2, 2014 in the Art of the Americas Building, Level 1.

== Tributes ==
On 24 April 2013, Google celebrated Gabriel Figueroa's 106th Birthday with a doodle.

== Filmography ==
=== Cinematographer ===
Year	Title	Director	Notes
1934	El Escándalo	Chano Urueta	
1935	Tribu	Miguel Contreras Torres	with Alex Phillips
1935	El primo Basilio	Carlos de Nájera	
1936	Allá en el Rancho Grande	Fernando de Fuentes	
1936	Beautiful Sky	Robert Quigley	with Jack Draper
1937	Las mujeres mandan	Fernando de Fuentes	with Jack Draper
1937	Beneath the Sky of Mexico	Fernando de Fuentes	
1937	Jalisco nunca pierde	Chano Urueta	
1938	Song of the Soul	Chano Urueta	
1938	La Adelita	Guillermo Hernández Gómez	
1938	Mi candidato	Chano Urueta	
1938	Refugees in Madrid	Alejandro Galindo	
1938	Los millones de Chaflán	Rolando Aguilar	
1938	Padre de más de cuatro	Robert Quigley	
1938	While Mexico Sleeps	Alejandro Galindo	
1939	The House of the Ogre	Fernando de Fuentes	
1939	The Black Beast	Gabriel Soria	
1939	Dark Night of the Mayas	Chano Urueta	
1939	Papacito lindo	Fernando de Fuentes	
1940	Los de abajo	Chano Urueta	
1940	The Miracle Song	Rolando Aguilar	
1940	¡Que viene mi marido!	Chano Urueta	
1940	Allá en el trópico	Fernando de Fuentes	
1940	El jefe máximo	Fernando de Fuentes	
1940	Con su amable permiso	Fernando Soler	
1940	El monje loco	Alejandro Galindo	
1941	Neither Blood nor Sand	Alejandro Galindo	
1941	The 9.15 Express	Alejandro Galindo	
1941	Those Were The Days, Senor Don Simon!	Julio Bracho	
1941	La casa del rencor	Gilberto Martínez Solares	
1941	The Unknown Policeman	Miguel M. Delgado	
1941	La gallina clueca	Fernando de Fuentes	
1942	Virgen de medianoche	Alejandro Galindo	
1942	Mi viuda alegre	Miguel M. Delgado	
1942	When the Stars Travel	Alberto Gout	
1942	Story of a Great Love	Julio Bracho	
1942	The Three Musketeers	Miguel M. Delgado	Cannes Film Festival Award
1942	El verdugo de Sevilla	Fernando Soler	
1942	The Saint Who Forged a Country	Julio Bracho	
1943	The Circus	Miguel M. Delgado	
1943	Flor silvestre	Emilio Fernández	
1943	The Spectre of the Bride	René Cardona	
1943	Another Dawn	Julio Bracho	
1944	The Black Ace	René Cardona	
1944	The Headless Woman	René Cardona	
1944	María Candelaria	Emilio Fernández	Cannes Film Festival Award
1944	The Escape	Norman Foster	
1944	The Black Pirate	Chano Urueta	
1944	The Intruder	Mauricio Magdaleno	
1944	Adiós, Mariquita linda	Alfonso Patiño Gómez	with Víctor Herrera
1945	The Abandoned	Emilio Fernández	
1945	Bugambilia	Emilio Fernández	Nominated – Ariel Award for Best Cinematography
1945	A Day with the Devil	Miguel M. Delgado	
1946	Cantaclaro	Julio Bracho	
1946	Más allá del amor	Adolfo Fernández Bustamante	
1946	The Last Adventure	Gilberto Martínez Solares	
1946	Enamorada	Emilio Fernández	Ariel Award for Best Cinematography
1947	La casa colorada	Miguel Morayta	
1947	The Pearl	Emilio Fernández	Ariel Award for Best Cinematography; Golden Globe Award for Best Cinematography
1947	The Fugitive	John Ford	
1948	Río Escondido	Emilio Fernández	Ariel Award for Best Cinematography
1948	María la O	Adolfo Fernández Bustamante	
1948	Tarzan and the Mermaids	Robert Florey	with Jack Draper
1948	Maclovia	Emilio Fernández	
1948	Dueña y señora	Tito Davison	
1949	Salón México	Emilio Fernández	
1949	Pueblerina	Emilio Fernández	Ariel Award for Best Cinematography
1949	Prisión de sueños	Víctor Urruchúa	
1949	Midnight	Tito Davison	
1949	El embajador	Tito Davison	
1949	Opium	Ramón Peón	
1949	The Unloved Woman	Emilio Fernández	Venice Film Festival Award for Best Cinematography
1949	Un cuerpo de mujer	Tito Davison	
1950	Duel in the Mountains	Emilio Fernández	
1950	Nuestras vidas	Ramón Peón	
1950	The Torch	Emilio Fernández	
1950	Un día de vida	Emilio Fernández	
1950	Los Olvidados	Luis Buñuel	Ariel Award for Best Cinematography
1951	Víctimas del Pecado	Emilio Fernández	Nominated – Ariel Award for Best Cinematography
1951	Pecado	Luis César Amadori	
1951	Los pobres siempre van al cielo	Jaime Salvador	
1951	The Chicken Hawk	Rogelio A. González	
1951	Maria Islands	Emilio Fernández	
1951	La bienamada	Emilio Fernández	
1952	The Atomic Fireman	Miguel M. Delgado	
1952	Forever Yours	Emilio Fernández	
1952	Un gallo en corral ajeno	Julián Soler	
1952	El mar y tú	Emilio Fernández	
1952	El enamorado	Miguel Zacarías	
1952	Here Comes Martin Corona	Miguel Zacarías	
1952	Hay un niño en su futuro	Fernando Cortés	
1952	Soledad's Shawl	Roberto Gavaldón	Ariel Award for Best Cinematography
1952	When the Fog Lifts	Emilio Fernández	Nominated – Ariel Award for Best Cinematography
1953	Dos tipos de cuidado	Ismael Rodríguez	
1953	Anxiety	Miguel Zacarías	
1953	Él	Luis Buñuel	
1953	The Photographer	Miguel M. Delgado	
1953	Neither Rich nor Poor	Fernando Cortés	
1953	The Boy and the Fog	Roberto Gavaldón	Ariel Award for Best Cinematography
1954	Camelia	Roberto Gavaldón	
1954	Take Me in Your Arms	Julio Bracho	
1954	The White Rose	Emilio Fernández; Íñigo de Martino	
1954	La rebelión de los colgados	Alfredo B. Crevenna	
1955	El monstruo en la sombra	Zacarías Gómez Urquiza	
1955	Madame X	Julián Soler	
1955	Estafa de amor	Miguel M. Delgado	
1955	La Tierra del Fuego se apaga	Emilio Fernández	
1956	La doncella de piedra	Miguel M. Delgado	
1956	Historia de un amor	Roberto Gavaldón	
1956	Pueblo, canto y esperanza	Alfredo B. Crevenna; Rogelio A. González; Julián Soler	
1956	La escondida	Roberto Gavaldón	Nominated – Ariel Award for Best Cinematography
1956	Canasta de cuentos mexicanos	Julio Bracho	
1957	El bolero de Raquel	Miguel M. Delgado	
1958	Sueños de oro	Miguel Zacarías	
1958	Aquí está Heraclio Bernal	Roberto Gavaldón	
1958	Mujer en condominio	Rogelio A. González	
1958	Una cita de amor	Emilio Fernández	
1958	El rayo de Sinaloa (La venganza de Heraclio Bernal)	Roberto Gavaldón	
1958	La rebelión de la sierra	Roberto Gavaldón	
1958	Una golfa	Tulio Demicheli	
1958	La sonrisa de la Virgen	Roberto Rodríguez	
1958	Carabina 30-30	Miguel M. Delgado	
1959	Café Colón	Benito Alazraki	
1959	Nazarín	Luis Buñuel	
1959	Beyond All Limits	Roberto Gavaldón	
1959	Sonatas	Juan Antonio Bardem	with Cecilio Paniagua
1959	Isla para dos	Tito Davison	
1959	The Soldiers of Pancho Villa	Ismael Rodríguez	
1959	La Fièvre Monte à El Pao	Luis Buñuel	
1960	Impaciencia del corazón	Tito Davison	
1960	La estrella vacía	Emilio Gómez Muriel	
1960	The Young One	Luis Buñuel	
1960	Macario	Roberto Gavaldón	
1960	Juana Gallo	Miguel Zacarías	
1961	Rosa Blanca	Roberto Gavaldón	
1961	Ánimas Trujano (El hombre importante)	Ismael Rodríguez	
1962	The Exterminating Angel	Luis Buñuel	
1962	El tejedor de milagros	Francisco del Villar	
1962	La bandida	Roberto Rodríguez	
1962	Um Dia de Vida	Augusto Fraga	with João Moreira
1963	The Paper Man	Ismael Rodríguez	
1963	Autumn Days	Roberto Gavaldón	Mexican Film Journalists Award for Best Cinematography
1963	Immediate Delivery	Miguel M. Delgado	
1964	The Night of the Iguana	John Huston	Nominated – Academy Award for Best Cinematography
1964	En la mitad del mundo	Ramón Pereda	
1964	El gallo de oro	Roberto Gavaldón	
1965	Simon of the Desert	Luis Buñuel	
1965	Escuela para solteras	Miguel Zacarías	
1965	Los tres calaveras	Fernando Cortés	
1965	Un alma pura	Juan Ibáñez	
1965	Lola de mi vida	Miguel Barbachano-Ponce	
1966	Los cuatro Juanes	Miguel Zacarías	
1966	¡Viva Benito Canales!	Miguel M. Delgado	
1966	Cargamento prohibido	Miguel M. Delgado	
1967	Pedro Páramo	Carlos Velo	
1967	Su Excelencia	Miguel M. Delgado	with Rosalío Solano
1967	Domingo salvaje	Francisco del Villar	
1967	El asesino se embarca	Miguel M. Delgado	
1968	Los ángeles de Puebla	Francisco del Villar	
1968	El escapulario	Servando González	
1968	Mariana	Juan Guerrero	
1968	Corazón salvaje	Tito Davison	with Alex Phillips
1968	The Chinese Room	Albert Zugsmith	
1969	The Big Cube	Tito Davison	
1969	La puerta y la mujer del carnicero	Luis Alcoriza; Ismael Rodríguez; Chano Urueta	with Alex Phillips
1969	The Great Sex War	Norman Foster	
1970	Narda o el verano	Juan Guerrero	
1970	Two Mules for Sister Sara	Don Siegel	with Robert Surtees
1970	The Phantom Gunslinger	Albert Zugsmith	
1970	Kelly's Heroes	Brian G. Hutton	
1971	La generala	Juan Ibáñez	
1971	El profe	Miguel M. Delgado	
1971	El cielo y tu	Gilberto Gazcón	
1972	María	Tito Davison	Ariel Award for Best Cinematography
1972	Hijazo de mi vidaza	Rafael Baledón	
1972	Los hijos de Satanás	Rafael Baledón	
1972	El festin de la loba	Francisco del Villar	
1973	Interval	Daniel Mann	
1973	Once Upon a Scoundrel	George Schaefer	
1973	El monasterio de los buitres	Francisco del Villar	
1973	El amor tiene cara de mujer	Tito Davison	
1974	El señor de Osanto	Jaime Humberto Hermosillo	Nominated – Ariel Award for Best Cinematography
1974	Los perros de Dios	Francisco del Villar	
1974	Presagio	Luis Alcoriza	Nominated – Ariel Award for Best Cinematography
1975	El llanto de la tortuga	Francisco del Villar	
1976	Coronación	Sergio Olhovich	Nominated – Ariel Award for Best Cinematography
1976	La vida cambia	Juan Manuel Torres	
1977	Maten al león	José Estrada	
1977	Balún Canán	Benito Alazraki	
1978	Divinas palabras	Juan Ibáñez	Ariel Award for Best Cinematography
1978	Cananea	Marcela Fernández Violante	
1978	The Children of Sanchez	Hall Bartlett	
1978	La casa del pelícano	Sergio Véjar	
1979	Te quiero	Tito Davison	
1980	Border Cop	Christopher Leitch	
1981	D.F./Distrito Federal	Rogelio A. González	
1981	El héroe desconocido	Julián Pastor	
1983	México 2000	Rogelio A. González	
1983	Mundo mágico	Luis Mandoki; Alejandro Talavera; Raúl Zermeño	
1984	El corazón de la noche	Jaime Humberto Hermosillo	
1984	Under the Volcano	John Huston	
1986	El maleficio II	Raúl Araiza	with José Ortiz Ramos

=== Camera operator ===
Year	Title	Director	Notes
1933	El vuelo glorioso de Barberán y Collar	René Cardona	
1934	Viva Villa!	Jack Conway	
1936	María Elena	Raphael J. Sevilla	also as Lighting technician
1936	Let's Go with Pancho Villa	Fernando de Fuentes	

=== Still photographer ===
Year	Title	Director
1933	Revolution	Miguel Contreras Torres; Antonio Moreno
1933	Profanación	Chano Urueta
1934	Almas encontradas	Raphael J. Sevilla
1934	Enemigos	Chano Urueta
1934	Juarez and Maximilian	Miguel Contreras Torres; Raphael J. Sevilla
1934	The Woman of the Port	Arcady Boytler; Raphael J. Sevilla
1934	The Call of the Blood	José Bohr; Raphael J. Sevilla
1934	Chucho el Roto	Gabriel Soria

== Awards and nominations ==
=== Academy Awards ===
Year	Nominated work	Category	Result
1965	The Night of the Iguana	Best Cinematography	Nominated

=== Golden Globe Awards ===
Year	Nominated work	Category	Result
1949	The Pearl	Best Cinematography	Won

=== Ariel Awards ===
Year	Work	Category	Result
1946	Bugambilia	Best Cinematography	Nominated
1947	Enamorada	Best Cinematography	Won
1948	The Pearl	Best Cinematography	Won
1949	Río Escondido	Best Cinematography	Won
1950	Pueblerina	Best Cinematography	Won
1951	Los Olvidados	Best Cinematography	Won
1952	Víctimas del Pecado	Best Cinematography	Nominated
1953	Soledad's Shawl	Best Cinematography	Won
1953	Cuando levanta la niebla	Best Cinematography	Nominated
1954	The Boy and the Fog	Best Cinematography	Won
1957	La escondida	Best Cinematography	Nominated
1973	María	Best Cinematography	Won
1974	El señor de Osanto	Best Cinematography	Nominated
1975	Presagio	Best Cinematography	Nominated
1976	Coronación	Best Cinematography	Nominated
1978	Divinas palabras	Best Cinematography	Won

=== Film festivals ===
Year	Festival	Category	Work	Result	Ref.
1946	Cannes Film Festival	Best Cinematography	María Candelaria; The Three Musketeers	Won	
1947	Locarno International Film Festival	Best Cinematography	María Candelaria	Won	
1947	Venice Film Festival	Best Cinematography	The Pearl	Won	
1949	Venice Film Festival	Best Cinematography	The Unloved Woman	Won	

== See also ==
- List of Mexican Academy Award winners and nominees
- Cinema of Mexico

== Sources ==
- Figueroa, Gabriel; Maillé, Mauricio; Monterde, Fernanda; Morales, Alfonso; Monterde, Claudia; Orozco, Héctor (2008). Gabriel Figueroa: Travesías de una mirada. Consejo Nacional para la Cultura y las Artes. ISBN 978-6-0775-1517-3. OCLC 761044362.
- Higgins, Ceri (2008). Gabriel Figueroa: Nuevas Perspectivas. Consejo Nacional para la Cultura y las Artes, Dirección General de Publicaciones. ISBN 978-6-0745-5080-1. OCLC 601690208.
- Isaac, Alberto (1993). Conversaciones con Gabriel Figueroa. Universidad de Guadalajara, Centro de Investigación y Enseñanza Cinematográficas. ISBN 978-968-895-421-8. OCLC 606317484.
- Feder, Elena (Spring 1996). "A Reckoning: Interview with Gabriel Figueroa". Film Quarterly. University of California Press. ISSN 0015-1386. OCLC 7021572304.
- Sánchez, Alberto Ruy; Figueroa, Gabriel; Tejeda, Roberto; Fuentes, Carlos; Mansilla, Margarita; de Orellana, Margarita; Monsiváis, Carlos; Tejada, Roberto; Cuevas, José Luis (Fall 1992). "Artes de México - EL ARTE DE GABRIEL FIGUEROA: SEGUNDA EDICION". Gustavo Pérez: Ceramica Contemporánea. Margarita de Orellana. ISSN 0300-4953.
