= Eduardo Arozamena =

Mexican actor

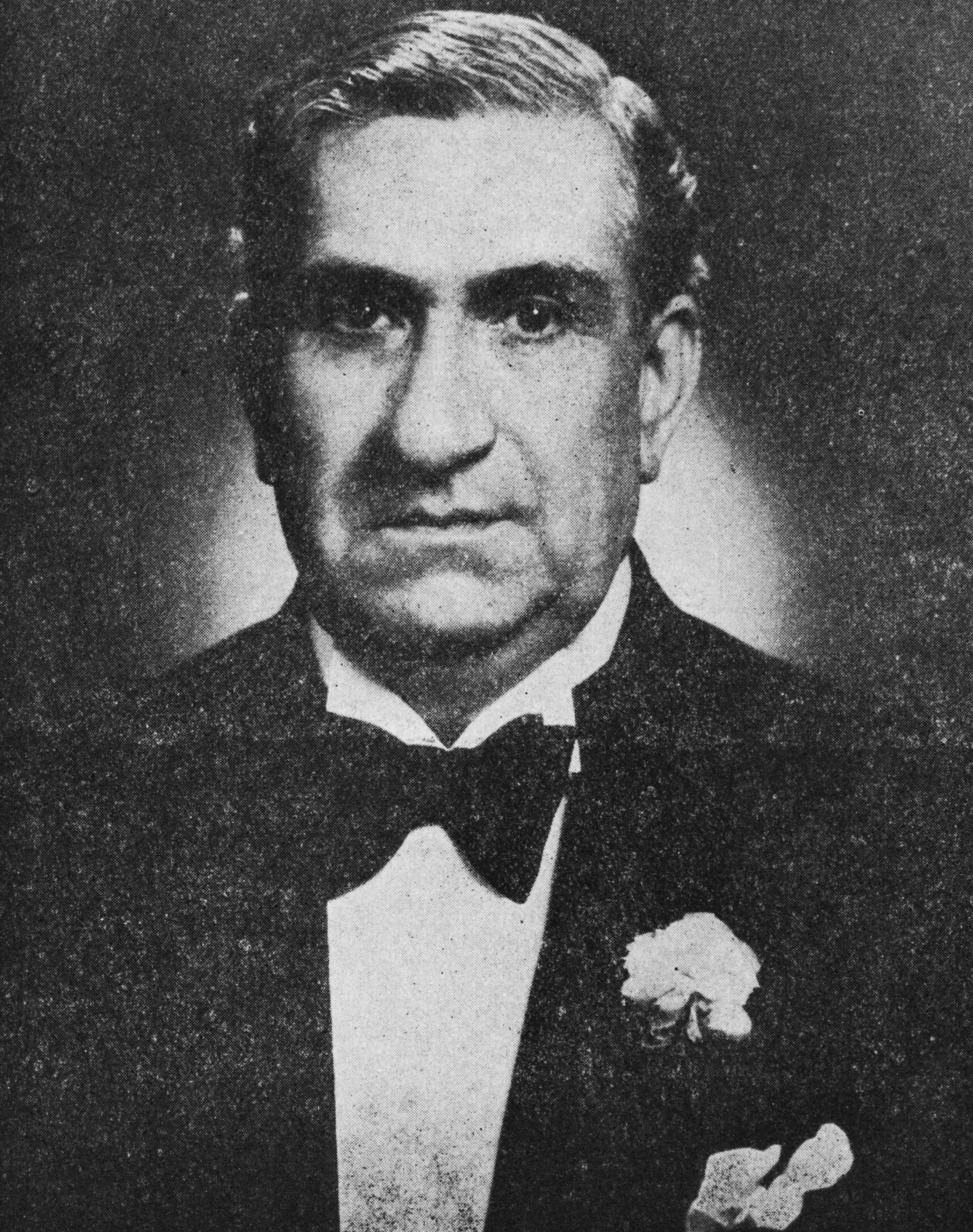
- Eduardo Arozamena in 1945
- Born: 13 October 1875; Mexico City, Mexico
- Died: 21 May 1951 (aged 75); Mexico City, Mexico
- Other name: Nanche Arozamena
- Occupations: Actor, film director and screenwriter
- Honours: Ariel prize 1949

Eduardo Arozamena Lira (13 October 1875 – 21 May 1951) was a Mexican actor. His nickname was "El Nanche Arozamena".

Son of Juan Arozamena and Guadalupe Lira y Argomanes. Initially a singer (baritone), theater actor, he later ventured into film, where he was also a director and screenwriter.

He worked in Mexico as well as in the United States, where he participated in the famous 1931 Dracula Spanish-language film, directed by George Melford.

He also entered literature as a storyteller, with his works being published in the weekly "Mefistófeles". He later authored the weekly column Parece que fue ayer ("It seems like yesterday"), published in the newspaper El Universal Ilustrado.

The National Association of Actors (ANDA) of Mexico named their most important medal, awarded to its members when they turn 50 years of career, in his honor.

== Filmography ==
- La soñadora (1917)
- Don Juan diplomático (1931) as Doctor
- Resurrection (1931)
- Drácula (1931) as Van Helsing
- Cheri-Bibi (1931) as Bourrelier
- El tenorio del harem (1931) as El mercador
- Tierra, amor y dolor (1935)
- Monja casada, virgen y mártir (1935) as Don Juan Gutiérrez
- Martín Garatuza (1935)
- Tribu (1935) as Zotil
- El rayo de Sinaloa (1935) as Don Antonio Fajardo
- Almas rebeldes (1937)
- Abnegación (1938)
- Guadalupe La Chinaca (1938) as Don Julián de Avellaneda
- Caminos de ayer (1938) as Stefano Mascagnini
- Perjura (1938) as Don Gonzalo
- María (1938) as Don Jerónimo
- El capitán aventurero (1939) as Don Martin, el corregidor
- Every Madman to His Specialty (1939) as Severo - Cedronio Conquián
- Perfidia (1939) as Ernesto, Baroni's Old Friend
- Luces de barriada (1939)
- Miente y serás feliz (1940) as Doctor
- Los de abajo (1940) as Venancio
- Here's the Point (1940) as Juez sordo
- Con su amable permiso (1940) as Don Ramón de Olvera
- El milagro de Cristo (1941)
- Las cinco advertencias de Satanás (1941)
- The Unknown Policeman (1941)
- El que tenga un amor (1942)
- Simón Bolívar (1942) as Presidente del Congreso del Perú (uncredited)
- ¡Así se quiere en Jalisco! (1942) as El Tata
- The Circus (1943) as Coronel (as E. Arozamena)
- Morenita clara (1943) as Padre Jesús
- Wild Flower (1943) as Melchor
- De Nueva York a Huipanguillo (1943)
- Doña Bárbara (1943) as Melesio Sandoval
- Mexicanos al grito de guerra (1943) as Señor Salas
- ¡Viva mi desgracia! (1944) as Don Doroteo
- Caminito alegre (1944) as Don José Limón
- Felipe Derblay, el herrero (1944)
- La vida inútil de Pito Pérez (1944) as Padre Jureco
- El amor de los amores (1944)
- Toros, amor y gloria (1944) as Don Leopoldo
- Así son ellas (1944)
- El médico de las locas (1944) as Agustín
- Balajú (1944)
- El mexicano (1944)
- Bartolo toca la flauta (1945) as Don Erasmo
- El precio de una vida (1945)
- El jagüey de las ruinas (1945)
- Sendas del destino (1945) as Padre de Carlos
- Flor de durazno (1945) as Padre Filemón
- Canaima (1945, uncredited)
- La pajarera (1945) as Don Margarito
- Dizziness (1946) as Don José María
- Rancho de mis recuerdos (1946)
- Rayando el sol (1946) as Padre de Lupe
- El jinete fantasma (1946)
- María Magdalena: Pecadora de Magdala (1946) as Caifás
- Enamorada (1946) as Alcalde Joaquín Gómez
- La fuerza de la sangre (1947)
- El conquistador (1947)
- Los cristeros (1947) as Tío Alejo
- Reina de reinas: La Virgen María (1948) as Caifás
- Río Escondido (1948) as Don Marcelino
- El muchacho alegre (1948) as Don Manuel
- La sin ventura (1948) as Don Nicolás
- La casa de la Troya (1948) as Don Servando
- Maclovia (1948) as Cabo Mendoza
- El gallero (1948) as Aurelio de la Torre
- Flor de caña (1948)
- La vorágine (1949)
- Bamba (1949) as Don Gumersindo
- Yo maté a Juan Charrasqueado (1949)
- El miedo llegó a Jalisco (1949)
- Café de chinos (1949) as Doctor
- Tierra muerta (1949)
- The Unloved Woman (1949) as Pastor (uncredited)
- The Woman I Lost (1949) as Abuelo
- Duel in the Mountains (1950) as Don Rodrigo Vargas
- Black Angustias (1950) as Antón Farrera
- Red Rain (1950) as Dueño de tienda
- Matrimonio y mortaja (1950) as Don Próspero
- The Torch (1950)
- Yo también soy de Jalisco (1950)
- La fe en Dios (1950) as Señor cura
- Un día de vida (1950) as Pomposo
- Pata de palo (1950) as Don Cástulo, abuelo
- Capitán de rurales (1951) as Tío de Hipólito (uncredited)
- ¡... Y murió por nosotros! (1951) as Filemón
- The Brave Bulls (1951) as Don Alberto Iriarte
- The Shrew (1951) as Sacerdote
- María Montecristo (1951) as Profesor Fabré
- El suavecito (1951) as Sr. Soto, padre de Lupita
- La bienamada (1951)
- Sangre en el barrio (1952) as Don Andrés
- Un gallo en corral ajeno (1952) as Don Raymundo

== Awards and honors ==
Year	Award	Nominated work	Result	Ref.
1947	Ariel Award for Best New Actor	Enamorada	Won	
1949	Ariel Award for Best Actor in a Minor Role	Río Escondido	Nominated	
