= Bugambilia =

- Directed by: Emilio Fernández
- Written by: Emilio Fernández; Mauricio Magdaleno
- Produced by: Felipe Subervielle
- Starring: Dolores del Río; Pedro Armendáriz; Julio Villarreal
- Cinematography: Gabriel Figueroa
- Edited by: Gloria Schoemann
- Music by: Raúl Lavista
- Distributed by: Films Mundiales
- Release date: 2 November 1945
- Running time: 105 minutes
- Country: Mexico
- Language: Spanish

Bugambilia (Bougainvillea) is a 1945 Mexican drama, romance film directed by Emilio Fernández and starring Dolores del Río and Pedro Armendáriz.

== Plot ==
In the Mexican city of Guanajuato, in the 1800s, the young and beautiful Amalia de los Robles (Dolores del Río) wakes up the passion of all the men of the region. This provokes the fury of her widowed father, Don Fernando (Julio Villarreal) who sees in her the face of his dead wife. But Amalia falls in love with the smart Ricardo (Pedro Armendáriz). Tragic circumstances, however, prevent them from being united.

== Cast ==
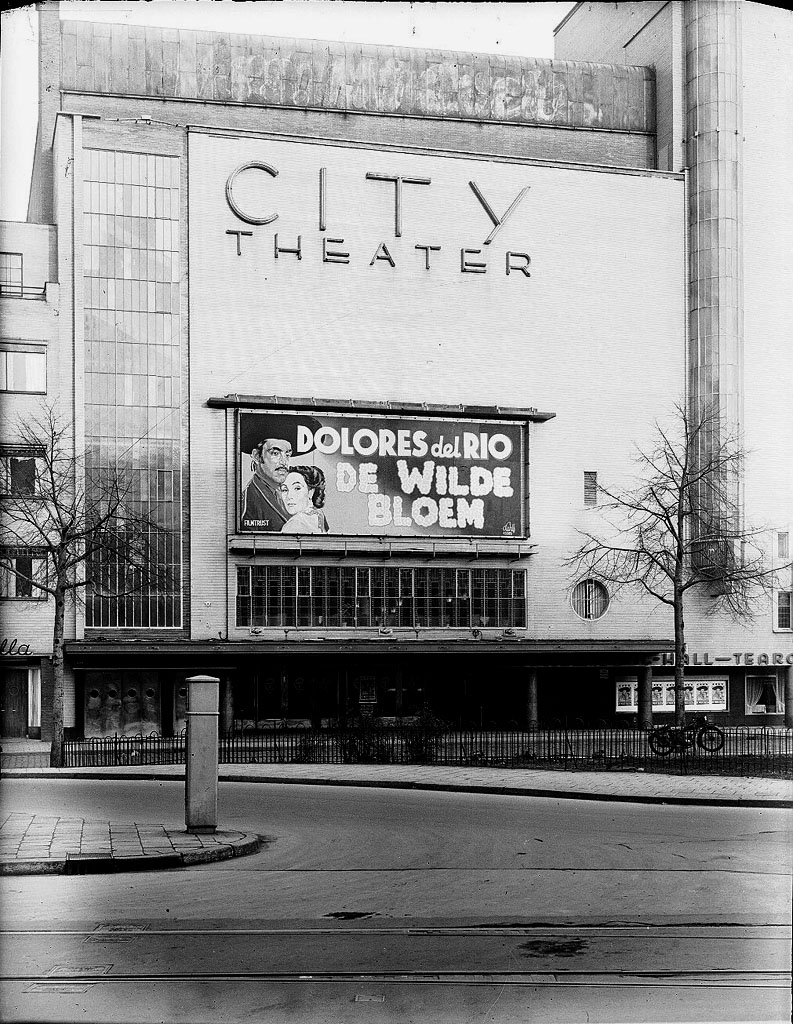
Publicity poster for the film announcing its showing in 1947 at the City Theater located on the Kleine-Gartmanplantsoen, Amsterdam

- Dolores del Río .... Amalia de los Robles
- Pedro Armendáriz .... Ricardo Rojas
- Julio Villarreal .... Don Fernando de los Robles
- Alberto Galán .... Luis Felipe
- Stella Inda .... Zarca
- Arturo Soto Rangel .... Cura
- Concha Sanza .... Nana Nicanora
- Roberto Cañedo .... Alberto, el poeta
- José Elías Moreno .... Socio de Ricardo
- Maruja Grifell .... Matilde, la chismosa
- Felipe de Alba .... invitado a fiesta
