= The Rapture (1954 film) =

- Directed by: Emilio Fernández
- Written by: Emilio Fernández; Mauricio Magdaleno; Íñigo de Martino
- Produced by: David Negrete
- Starring: Jorge Negrete; María Félix; Andrés Soler
- Cinematography: Agustín Martínez Solares
- Edited by: Gloria Schoemann
- Music by: Manuel Esperón
- Production company: Filmadora Atlántida
- Release date: 23 April 1954
- Running time: 85 minutes
- Country: Mexico
- Language: Spanish

The Rapture (Spanish: El rapto) is a 1954 Mexican drama film directed by Emilio Fernández and starring Jorge Negrete, María Félix, and Andrés Soler. The film's two stars had recently married, and this was used in advertising publicity. It was made at the Estudios Churubusco in Mexico City.

== Cast ==
- Jorge Negrete as Ricardo Alfaro
- María Félix as Aurora Campos
- Andrés Soler as Don Cástulo
- José Elías Moreno as Don Constancio
- Rodolfo Landa as Prudencio
- José Ángel Espinosa 'Ferrusquilla' as Don Cándido
- Beatriz Ramos as Perfecta
- Antonio Bribiesca
- Agustín Fernández
- Jaime Fernández
- Rogelio Fernández
- Emilio Gálvez
- Manuel Noriega
- Emma Roldán as Constancio's wife
- Lety Valencia

== Bibliography ==
- Daniel Balderston, Mike Gonzalez & Ana M. Lopez. Encyclopedia of Contemporary Latin American and Caribbean Cultures. Routledge, 2002.
