= Yu-Mex =

Music genre in Yugoslavia

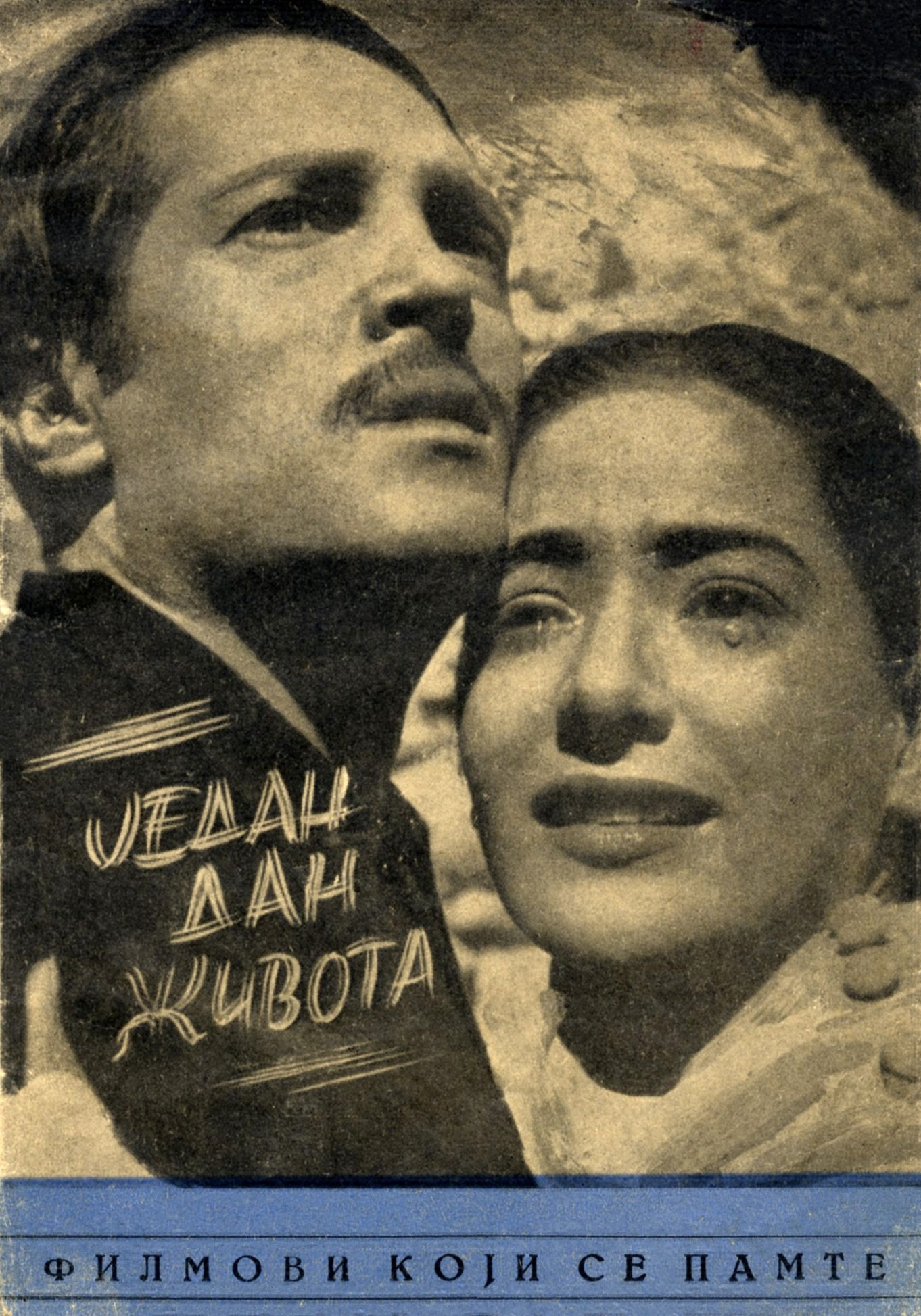
Cover of a Yugoslav pamphlet promoting the local release of the 1950 film Un día de vida, which was known as Jedan dan života in Yugoslavia. Depicted are stars Roberto Cañedo and Columba Domínguez.

Yu-Mex (a portmanteau of "Yugoslav" and "Mexican") was a style of popular music in the Socialist Federal Republic of Yugoslavia which incorporated elements of traditional Mexican music (such as mariachi and ranchera). The style was mostly popular during the 1950s and 1960s when a string of Yugoslav singers began performing traditional Mexican songs.

== History ==
In the immediate post-war period, Yugoslavia did not have much of a film industry and the majority of films were imported from the Soviet Union. Following the Tito–Stalin split of 1948, Soviet films were no longer shown in the country. At the same time, due to ideological differences, Yugoslav president Josip Broz Tito did not want his country to import American films. As a result, he turned to importing Mexican films. The fact that many Mexican films of the "Golden Age" glorified the Mexican Revolution and depicted ordinary Mexicans rising up against the oppressive Mexican state made Mexican films "revolutionary" enough to be shown in Yugoslavia. Many parallels were drawn between the struggle waged by the Yugoslav Partisans in World War II and the guerrillas who fought in the Mexican Revolution.

The first Mexican film to premiere in Yugoslavia was the 1950 drama Un día de vida (One Day of Life, Jedan dan života), which became a huge hit when it appeared in Yugoslav theaters in 1952. The plot of Un día de vida, which dealt with the execution of a rebel during the Mexican Revolution, brought many Yugoslav audiences to tears, as they saw a parallel with their own experiences in World War II.

Other, less political Mexican films, such as comedies and romances, also became popular. It was common for many young Yugoslavs to imitate the styles of Mexican film stars, who were seen as embodying everything that was "cool". Because many of the films shown in Yugoslavia in the 1950s–1960s were Mexican, everything Mexican became very popular in Yugoslavia and many musicians started to don sombreros to perform Mexican music, either singing in Serbo-Croatian or in the original Spanish. The interest slowly faded after the 1970s.

Some of the well-known Yu-Mex performers of the era were Nikola Karović, Slavko Perović, Ljubomir Milić and his ensemble Paloma (a.k.a. Palomci, among them Rade Todosijević), Miroslava Mrđa, Đorđe Masalović, Ana Milosavljević, Trio Tividi, Manjifiko, Nevenka Arsova, and others. Other famous singers and musicians, such as Predrag Cune Gojković and Mišo Kovač, also performed Yu-Mex songs.

== In the media ==
Slovenian writer Miha Mazzini renewed the interest in Yu-Mex music after publishing his novel Paloma Negra in 2013. During the research for the novel, Mazzini recorded the stories told by protagonists and made a TV documentary YumMex - Yugoslav Mexico.

Croatia Records issues a 4CD compilation of Yu-Mex songs covering the period between 1951 and 2011 titled 101 Meksikanska (101 Mexicana, 101 Canciones Mejicanas).

In 2018, Mexican non-profit organization Stultifera Navis Institutom traveled the Balkans in order to make the project "Kamarones, Jugoslavia." According to their website: "Fed by what has been called yugostalgia or yugonostalgia, 'Kamarones, Jugoslavia' rehearses the possibility of a trip to imaginary Yugoslavia through the geography of an allegorical Mexico."

== Additional resources ==
- Ana Petrov. Jugoslovenska muzika bez Jugoslavije. FMK, 2016. ISBN 978-86-87107-53-3.
- Miha Manzzini. Paloma Negra. Open Books, 2014. ISBN 978-0692253656.
- Miha Manzzini. YuMex - Yugoslav Mexico. Gustav film, 2013.
