= Ánimas Trujano (film) =

1962 film

The Important Man
- Ánimas Trujano (El hombre importante)
- Directed by: Ismael Rodríguez
- Written by: Ismael Rodríguez; Ricardo Garibay; Vicente Oroná Jr.
- Based on: La mayordomía by Rogelio Barriga Rivas
- Produced by: Ismael Rodríguez
- Starring: Toshiro Mifune; Columba Domínguez; Flor Silvestre; Antonio Aguilar
- Cinematography: Gabriel Figueroa
- Edited by: Jorge Bustos
- Music by: Raúl Lavista
- Production company: Películas Rodríguez
- Release date: January 10, 1962 (Mexico)
- Running time: 100 minutes
- Country: Mexico
- Language: Spanish

Ánimas Trujano (El hombre importante) (The Important Man) is a 1962 Mexican drama film directed by Ismael Rodríguez and starring Toshiro Mifune, Columba Domínguez, Flor Silvestre, and Antonio Aguilar. It is based on a novel by Rogelio Barriga Rivas.

The film was nominated for an Academy Award for Best Foreign Language Film.

== Plot ==
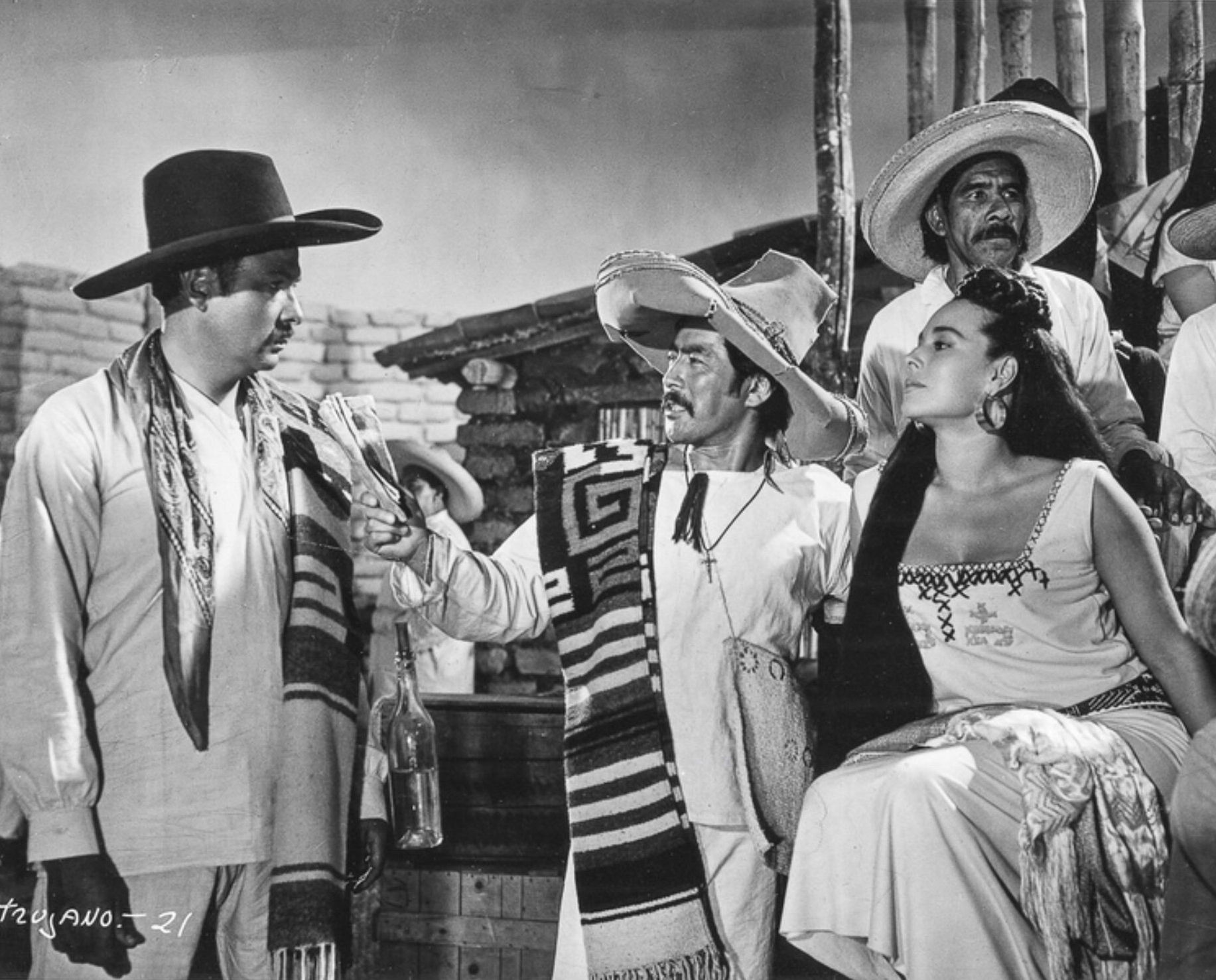
From left to right: Antonio Aguilar, Toshiro Mifune and Flor Silvestre in a publicity photograph for the film

The film's setting is a town in Oaxaca during the festival of its patron saint, for which the church appoints a layman as mayordomo or steward, an honor that in effect is gained by being able to organize and cover the high costs of most of the saint's local festivities. The post is however very coveted by the locals as it is socially prestigious.

Ánimas Trujano (Mifune, dubbed by Narciso Busquets) is a drunken, irresponsible peasant who abuses his children and does nothing while his long-suffering wife supports the family. Obsessed with earning the respect which is denied to him by his peers as a result of his behavior, Trujano aims to be mayordomo in the annual festival and begins to do everything he can to get the needed money. After his eldest daughter is impregnated out of wedlock by the son of the local land baron (played by Eduardo Fajardo), Trujano sells the baby to the land baron in exchange for a small fortune that makes him eligible to be appointed mayordomo.

Meanwhile, Trujano's wife (Columba Domínguez) encounters trouble when it is revealed that her husband has been seeing a local woman of dubious morals (Flor Silvestre).

== Cast ==
- Toshiro Mifune as Ánimas Trujano (dubbed by Narciso Busquets)
- Columba Domínguez as Juana
- Flor Silvestre as Catalina
- Pepe Romay as Pedrito (as Pepito Romay)
- Titina Romay as Dorotea
- Amado Zumaya as Compadre
- José Chávez as Brujo
- Luis Aragón as Tendero
- Juan Carlos Pulido as Belarmino
- Magda Monzón
- Jaime J. Pons as Carrizo
- David Reynoso as Criton
- Eduardo Fajardo as El Español
- Antonio Aguilar as Tadeo

== Awards and nominations ==
The film was nominated for the Academy Award for Best Foreign Language Film and a Golden Globe Award for Best Foreign Language Film in 1962.

== See also ==
- List of submissions to the 34th Academy Awards for Best Foreign Language Film
- List of Mexican submissions for the Academy Award for Best Foreign Language Film
