= Salón México =

- Directed by: Emilio Fernández
- Written by: Emilio Fernández; Mauricio Magdaleno
- Produced by: Salvador Elizondo; Fernando Marcos
- Starring: Marga López; Miguel Inclán; Rodolfo Acosta
- Cinematography: Gabriel Figueroa
- Edited by: Gloria Schoemann
- Music by: Antonio Díaz Conde
- Production company: Clasa Films Mundiales
- Distributed by: Clasa Films Mundiales
- Release date: 25 February 1949
- Running time: 95 minutes
- Country: Mexico
- Language: Spanish

Salón México is a 1949 Mexican film noir directed by Emilio Fernández and written jointly by Fernandez and Mauricio Magdaleno. It stars Marga López as a dance hall prostitute struggling to support her younger sister at an exclusive upscale school. It earned Lopez the 1950 Ariel Award for Best Actress and a nomination for the Ariel Award for Best Supporting Actor for Rodolfo Acosta.

The film is cited as a classic example of the Mexican genre of Cabaretera (Dance Hall film) about "a sympathetic character, a good woman forced into a bad life by circumstances beyond her control." It was remade as a 1996 film of the same title starring María Rojo.

The film's sets were designed by the art director Jesús Bracho.

== Synopsis ==
Mercedes works at the "Salón México" dance hall as a singer, dancer and prostitute. She is secretly supporting Beatriz, her younger sister, at an exclusive all-girls' college. Beatriz does not suspect what Mercedes is doing and dreams of marrying Roberto, a young Air Force pilot, who is the son of her school's principal. A dance contest with a large money prize of 500 pesos is announced and Mercedes enters it with Paco, her pimp. When they win, Paco refuses to share the prize money, giving her only the cheap trophy. A desperate Mercedes steals Paco's wallet while he sleeps. Lupe, a policeman, sees Mercedes discard the wallet.

The next day, Lupe confronts Mercedes who is visiting Beatriz outside the school. Lupe decides to help Mercedes instead of arresting her. Having fallen in love with Mercedes, Lupe pleads with her to marry him, and Mercedes accedes. However, Paco blackmails Mercedes, threatening to reveal her past to Beatriz and Roberto if she does not return with him. Mercedes stabs Paco who, while dying, shoots and kills Mercedes. Roberto and Lupe go together to collect her body from the morgue. Lupe does not reveal her past.

== Cast ==
- Marga López as Mercedes Gómez
- Miguel Inclán as Lupe López
- Rodolfo Acosta as Paco
- Roberto Cañedo as Roberto
- Mimí Derba as Señora directora
- Carlos Múzquiz as Dueño cabaret
- Fanny Schiller as Señorita prefecta
- Estela Matute as cabaretera
- Silvia Derbez as Beatriz
