= Forever Yours (1952 film) =

1952 film

- Directed by: Emilio Fernández
- Written by: Emilio Fernández; Mauricio Magdaleno
- Produced by: David Negrete
- Starring: Jorge Negrete; Gloria Marín; Tito Junco
- Cinematography: Gabriel Figueroa
- Edited by: Gloria Schoemann
- Music by: Antonio Díaz Conde
- Production company: Cinematographica Industrial Productora de Peliculas
- Distributed by: Clasa-Mohme
- Release date: 18 January 1952
- Running time: 90 minutes
- Country: Mexico
- Language: Spanish

Forever Yours (Spanish: Siempre tuya) is a 1952 Mexican drama film directed by Emilio Fernández and starring Jorge Negrete, Gloria Marín and Tito Junco. It is filmed in black and white, in Spanish, and features Negrete singing some popular ranchera-music standards. It was shot at the Churubusco Studios in Mexico City. The film's sets were designed by the art director Manuel Fontanals.

== Plot ==
The film follows the trials of tenant farmer Ramón García (Negrete) and his wife Soledad (Gloria Marín) when drought forces them off their land in the Mexican state of Zacatecas. They make their way to Mexico City, where they find city life difficult. Ramón cannot find steady work. They build a home in a squatters' settlement, but then their house is bulldozed by a developer. Soledad finds work as a live-in maid, and her husband can see her for only a few moments each evening.

Ramón, destitute and despondent, wanders into a theater during a live radio broadcast of an audience-participation talent show. Ramón volunteers for the show, and although the host makes fun of him as a hayseed, he wows the audience with a stirring version of the classic México Lindo y Querido (Lovely, beloved Mexico). The audience reaction causes the station manager to hire García as a featured performer, as a change of pace from more trendy musical genres. García gains a wide radio following by singing traditional songs praising the virtues of Mexico. Now highly paid and famous, García rents a luxurious apartment, but his wife Soledad fears that they do not belong in their new and rich surroundings.

Soledad's fears turn out to be prescient, as her husband soon falls into the clutches of Mirta (Joan Page) a blonde with a heavy American accent. In the end, however, Ramón realizes that he belongs with his loyal wife.

== Cast ==
- Jorge Negrete
- Gloria Marín
- Tito Junco
- Arturo Soto Rangel
- Juan M. Núñez
- Abel López
- Emilio Lara
- Ismael Pérez
- Ángel Infante
- Lupe del Castillo
- Fernando Galiana
- Joaquín Grajales
- Raúl Guerrero
- Juan Muñoz
- Joan Page

== Bibliography ==
- Barham, Jeremy (ed.) The Routledge Companion to Global Film Music in the Early Sound Era. Taylor & Francis, 2024.
- Holmstrom, John. The Moving Picture Boy: An International Encyclopaedia from 1895 to 1995. Norwich, Michael Russell, 1996, p. 340.
- Irwin, Robert & Ricalde, Maricruz. Global Mexican Cinema: Its Golden Age. British Film Institute, 2013.
