= Maclovia =

- polish poster
- Directed by: Emilio Fernández
- Written by: Emilio Fernández; Mauricio Magdaleno
- Produced by: Gregorio Walerstein
- Starring: María Félix; Pedro Armendáriz; Carlos López Moctezuma; Columba Domínguez
- Cinematography: Gabriel Figueroa
- Edited by: Gloria Schoemann
- Music by: Antonio Díaz Conde
- Distributed by: Filmex
- Release date: September 30, 1948
- Running time: 105 minutes
- Country: Mexico
- Language: Spanish

Maclovia (Belleza Maldita in some countries) is a 1948 Mexican romantic drama film directed by Emilio Fernández, who also co-wrote it along with Mauricio Magdaleno, and starring María Félix and Pedro Armendáriz.

== Plot summary ==
On the beautiful Janitzio Island, in the middle of the Pátzcuaro Lake in Michoacán in Mexico lives Maclovia (María Félix), the beautiful daughter of a leader of Purépecha Indian community (Miguel Inclán). Maclovia loves José María Lopez (Pedro Armendáriz), a young very poor Indian. Maclovia's father refuses to the marriage of the couple. José María hopes to win the favor of the old man. But the arrival of a battalion causing the conflict when the brutal sergeant (Carlos López Moctezuma) develops eyes for Maclovia.

== Notes and references ==
The movie was acclaimed during the 1949 edition of the Venice Film Festival. The face of María Félix characterized as Maclovia, hung from the bridges of San Marcos.
