= La Bandida (film) =

1963 film

- Directed by: Roberto Rodríguez
- Written by: Rafael Garcia Travesi and Roberto Rodriguez
- Produced by: Ismael Rodríguez
- Starring: María Félix; Katy Jurado; Pedro Armendáriz; Lola Beltrán
- Cinematography: Gabriel Figueroa
- Edited by: José W. Bustos
- Distributed by: Peliculas Rodriguez
- Release date: 1962
- Running time: 110 minutes
- Country: Mexico
- Language: Spanish

La Bandida ("The Bandida") is a 1962 Mexican film directed by Roberto Rodríguez. It stars María Félix.

It was screened at the 23rd Venice International Film Festival.

== Cast ==
- María Félix as María Mendoza 'La Bandida'
- Pedro Armendáriz as Roberto Herrera
- Ignacio Lopez Tarso as Anselmo
- Emilio Fernandez as Epigmenio Gomez
- Katy Jurado as La Jarocha
- Lola Beltrán as Cantante de palenque (Singer of palenque)
