= Duel in the Mountains =

1950 film

- Directed by: Emilio Fernández
- Written by: Emilio Fernández; Mauricio Magdaleno
- Based on: A Nest of the Gentry by Ivan Turgenev
- Produced by: Salvador Elizondo
- Starring: Rita Macedo; Fernando Fernández; Eduardo Arozamena
- Cinematography: Gabriel Figueroa
- Edited by: Jorge Bustos
- Music by: Antonio Díaz Conde
- Production company: Clasa Films Mundiales
- Distributed by: Clasa-Mohme
- Release date: 18 February 1950
- Running time: 84 minutes
- Country: Mexico
- Language: Spanish

Duel in the Mountains (Spanish: Duelo en las montañas) is a 1950 Mexican war drama film directed by Emilio Fernández and starring Rita Macedo, Fernando Fernández and Eduardo Arozamena. It is inspired by the novel A Nest of the Gentry by Ivan Turgenev. It was shot at the Clasa Studios in Mexico City. The film's sets were designed by the art directors Manuel Fontanals.

== Cast ==
- Rita Macedo as Esperanza
- Fernando Fernández as Julio Ramírez
- Eduardo Arozamena as Don Rodrigo Vargas
- Jorge Treviño as Don Jorge
- Fanny Schiller as Madre de Esperanza
- Guillermo Cramer as Coronel Rosalio Durán
- Salvador Quiroz as Teniente coronel
- Lupe Carriles as Esposa de Tito, pasajera tren
- Agustín Fernández as Teniente
- Jaime Fernández as Pueblerino
- Rogelio Fernández as Militar
- Ángel Infante as Conductor tren
- Margarito Luna as Autoridad
- Lupita Palomera as Cantante
- Ismael Pérez as Panchito
- Jorge Pérez as Estudiante
- Hernán Vera as Tito, pasajero tren
- Acela Vidaurri as Amiga de Esperanza

== Bibliography ==
- Gilabert, Rosa Peralt. Manuel Fontanals, escenógrafo: teatro, cine y exilio. Editorial Fundamentos, 2007.
- Holmstrom, John. The Moving Picture Boy: An International Encyclopaedia from 1895 to 1995. Norwich, Michael Russell, 1996, p. 340.
- Riera, Emilio García. Emilio Fernández, 1904–1986. Universidad de Guadalajara, 1987.
