= When the Fog Lifts =

1952 film

- Directed by: Emilio Fernández
- Written by: Julio Alejandro; Íñigo de Martino; Adolfo Torres Portillo
- Produced by: Miguel Alemán hijo
- Starring: Arturo de Córdova; María Elena Marqués; Columba Domínguez
- Cinematography: Gabriel Figueroa
- Edited by: Gloria Schoemann
- Music by: Antonio Díaz Conde
- Production company: Tele-Voz
- Distributed by: Clasa-Mohme
- Release date: 6 December 1952
- Running time: 100 minutes
- Country: Mexico
- Language: Spanish

When the Fog Lifts (Spanish: Cuando levanta la niebla) is a 1952 Mexican mystery thriller film directed by Emilio Fernández and starring Arturo de Córdova, María Elena Marqués and Columba Domínguez. It was shot at the Churubusco Studios in Mexico City. The film's sets were designed by the art director Manuel Fontanals.

== Cast ==
- Arturo de Córdova as Pablo
- María Elena Marqués as Silvia
- Columba Domínguez as Ana, enfermera
- Tito Junco as José Fuentes
- Arturo Soto Rangel as Tío Carlos
- Julio Villarreal as Doctor Arias
- Wolf Ruvinskis as Paciente
- Linda Cristal as Amiga de Silvia
- Rogelio Fernández as Empleado asilo
- Beatriz Saavedra as Amiga de Silvia

== Bibliography ==
- Gilabert, Rosa Peralt. Manuel Fontanals, escenógrafo: teatro, cine y exilio. Editorial Fundamentos, 2007.
- Riera, Emilio García. Emilio Fernández, 1904–1986. Universidad de Guadalajara, 1987.
- Tierney, Dolores. Emilio Fernández: Pictures in the Margins. Manchester and New York: Manchester UP, 2007.
