= The Boy and the Fog =

1953 film

- Film poster
- Directed by: Roberto Gavaldón
- Written by: Edmundo Báez; Roberto Gavaldón; Rodolfo Usigli
- Produced by: Jesús Grovas
- Starring: Dolores del Río; Pedro López Lagar; Eduardo Noriega
- Cinematography: Gabriel Figueroa
- Edited by: Gloria Schoemann
- Music by: Raúl Lavista
- Production company: Cinematográfica Grovas
- Distributed by: Azteca Films
- Release date: 24 December 1953
- Running time: 111 minutes
- Country: Mexico
- Language: Spanish

The Boy and the Fog (Spanish: El Niño y la niebla) is a 1953 Mexican drama film directed by Roberto Gavaldón and starring Dolores del Río, Pedro López Lagar and Eduardo Noriega. It was shot at the Churubusco Studios in Mexico City and on location around Poza Rica and Tuxpan in Veracruz. The film's sets were designed by the art director Manuel Fontanals. It was entered into the 1954 Cannes Film Festival.

== Plot ==
Marta (Dolores del Río) is a woman who lives obsessed, since her brother died of schizophrenia and her mother remains interned at a mental health hospital. Fearful that the disease is congenital, Marta keeps her family background secret from her husband while overprotecting her only son. Because of her obsession, Marta does not realize that the only psychologically affected in her family is her.

== Cast ==
- Dolores del Río as Marta
- Pedro López Lagar as Guillermo Estrada
- Eduardo Noriega as Mauricio de la Torre
- Alejandro Ciangherotti as Daniel
- Miguel Ángel Ferriz as Doctor
- Lupe Inclán as Jacinta
- Tana Lynn as Prostituta
- Carlos Riquelme as Professor
- Nicolás Rodríguez as Doctor

== Bibliography ==
- Hall, Linda. Dolores del Río: Beauty in Light and Shade. Stanford University Press, 2013.
