= Wild Flower (film) =

- Directed by: Emilio Fernández
- Written by: Emilio Fernández; Mauricio Magdaleno
- Produced by: Agustin J. Fink
- Starring: Dolores del Río; Pedro Armendáriz; Miguel Ángel Ferriz; Fernando Soto LaMarina; Mimí Derba
- Cinematography: Gabriel Figueroa
- Edited by: Jorge Bustos
- Music by: Francisco Domínguez
- Distributed by: Films Mundiales
- Release date: 1943
- Running time: 94 minutes
- Country: Mexico
- Language: Spanish

Wild Flower (Spanish: Flor silvestre) is a 1943 Mexican historical film directed by Emilio Fernández and starring Dolores del Río and Pedro Armendáriz. It is the first Mexican movie of Dolores del Río after her career in silent and Hollywood's Golden Age films. It is the first movie of an extended collaboration between Fernández-Del Rio-Armendáriz, Gabriel Figueroa (cinematography) and Mauricio Magdaleno (writer). It also marked the debut of Emilia Guiú in a small role as an extra. The film is considered one of the defining films of the Golden Age of Mexican cinema (1936-1956).

== Plot ==
In a small village in central Mexico in the early twentieth century, José Luis, son of the landowner Don Francisco, secretly marries Esperanza, a beautiful, but humble peasant. Disgusted by the wedding and because his son has become a revolutionary, Don Francisco disinherits his son and kicks him out of his house. After the triumph of the Mexican Revolution, the couple lives happily until Jose Luis is forced to confront a couple of false revolutionaries who have kidnapped Esperanza and his young son.

== Cast ==
- Dolores del Río as Esperanza
- Pedro Armendáriz as José Luis Castro
- Emilio Fernández as Rogelio Torres
- Miguel Ángel Ferriz as don Francisco
- Armando Soto La Marina as Reynaldo
- Agustín Isunza as Nicanor
- Eduardo Arozamena as Melchor
- Mimí Derba as doña Clara
- Margarita Cortés as sister of José Luis
- Manuel Dondé as Úrsulo Torres
- José Elías Moreno as colonel Pánfilo Rodríguez, Esperanza
- Lucha Reyes
- Trío Calaveras
- Pedro Galindo as Pedro
- Carlos Riquelme as Cura
- Tito Novaro as son of Esperanza
- Emilia Guiú as an extra

== Bibliography ==
- Segre, Erica. Intersected Identities: Strategies of Visualisation in Nineteenth- and Twentieth-century Mexican Culture. Berghahn Books, 2007.
