= Mauricio Magdaleno =

Mexican writer and politician (1906–1986)

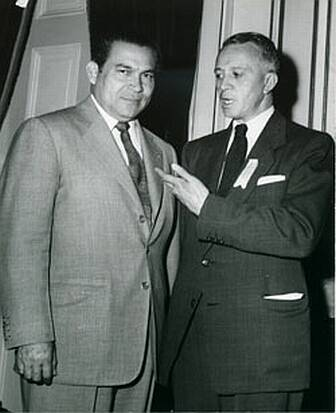
- Magdaleno (right) and Fulgencio Batista in 1956
- Born: Mauricio Magdaleno Cardona; 13 May 1906; Tabasco, Zacatecas, Mexico
- Died: 30 June 1986 (aged 80); Mexico City, Mexico
- Education: National Autonomous University of Mexico
- Occupations: Screenwriter; Director; Journalist; Writer; Politician

Mauricio Magdaleno Cardona (13 May 1906 – 30 June 1986), better known as Mauricio Magdaleno, was a Mexican writer, journalist, politician, screenwriter and occasional director of the Golden Age of Mexican cinema.

== Biography ==
As a journalist, he wrote for El Nacional and Excélsior. As a politician, Magdaleno held various elected positions, including federal congressman and senator for Zacatecas from 1958 to 1964. He later served as Undersecretary of Cultural Affairs at the Secretariat of Public Education during the administration of Gustavo Díaz Ordaz.

As a screenwriter Magdaleno wrote the script for over 50 movies. He worked with Emilio "El Indio" Fernández as director and Gabriel Figueroa as cinematographer in the films Flor Silvestre (1943), María Candelaria (1944), Río Escondido (1947), Salón México (1948), Pueblerina (1948) and La malquerida (1949).

== Awards and recognition ==
He was nominated for six Ariel Awards and won on his second nomination for Río Escondido in 1949.

In 1957, he was elected as member of the Academia Mexicana de la Lengua. In 1981 he was awarded the National Prize for Arts in the Linguistics and literature category.

== Literary work ==
=== Theatre ===
- 1932: Cuatro obras de revista política para el Teatro de Ahora (El periquillo sarniento, Corrido de la revolución, El pájaro carpintero, Romance de la conquista)
- 1933: Teatro revolucionario mexicano (including: Panuco 137; Emiliano Zapata y Trópico)

=== Novel ===
- 1927: Mapimí 37
- 1935: Campo Celis
- 1936: Concha Bretón
- 1937: El resplandor
- 1941: Sonata
- 1948: La Tierra Grande
- 1949: Cabello de Elote
- 1986: La noche cerrada (unfinished and not published).

=== Short story ===
- 1934: El compadre Mendoza
- 1954: El ardiente verano

=== Essay ===
- 1936: Vida y poesía
- 1939: Hostos y Albizu Campos
- 1940: Fulgor de Martí
- 1941: Rango
- 1948: Tierra y viento
- 1955: Ritual del año
- 1956: Las palabras perdidas
- 1964: La voz y el eco
- 1968: Agua bajo el puente
- 1978: Retórica de la Revolución
- 1979: Escritores extranjeros de la Revolución
- 1980: Hombres e ideas de la Revolución
- 1981: Instantes de la Revolución

== Selected filmography ==
- Wild Flower (1943)
- Michael Strogoff (1944)
- Tragic Wedding (1946)
- Pepita Jiménez (1946)
- Everybody's Woman (1946)
- Gran Casino (1947)
- The Unloved Woman (1949)
- Coquette (1949)
- Salón México (1949)
- Between Your Love and Heaven (1950)
- Duel in the Mountains (1950)
- Red Rain (1950)
- Orange Blossom for Your Wedding (1950)
- Love for Love (1950)
- History of a Heart (1951)
- Women's Prison (1951)
- Maria Islands (1951)
- Forever Yours (1952)
- The Three Perfect Wives (1953)
- The White Rose (1954)
- The Rapture (1954)
