= Rogelio Barriga Rivas =

Mexican writer

Rogelio Barriga Rivas (March 15, 1912 – January 9, 1961 in Mexico City), was a Mexican author born in Tlacolula, Oaxaca.

== Biography ==
Despite his short career, Barriga is considered one of the best writers of his time. He took a degree in law, and his experiences working as magistrate and judge were reflected in two of his books: Rio Humano, winner of the Lanz Duret prize in 1948, and Juez Letrado (1952).

Proud of his origin, in love with his native Oaxaca and the customs of the region, his first novel was La Guelaguetza (1947). As well as winning the Lanz Duret prize in 1951, La Mayordomia inspired the film Animas Trujano starring Toshirō Mifune, Flor Silvestre and Antonio Aguilar. The most famous of his other plots was made into the film Carcel de Mujeres directed by the Delgado brothers and featuring Sarita Montiel, Miroslava and Katy Jurado. Another idea inspired by his novels is reflected in Si yo fuera Diputado with Cantinflas.

Leaving innumerable poems and stories, having only begun his development as an author, with the possibility that a great career might have lain ahead of him, Barriga died of a heart attack in 1961, survived by his wife Ofelia and five children.
