= María Elena (film) =

1936 film by Raphael J. Sevilla

María Elena is a 1936 Mexican film directed by Raphael J. Sevilla. The film starred Carmen Guerrero (1911–1986), and Adolfo Girón (1904–1973). It also featured an early role for Pedro Armendáriz and Emilio Fernández. It was released in the United States by Grand National as She-Devil Island.
