= Columba Domínguez =

Mexican actress (1929–2014)

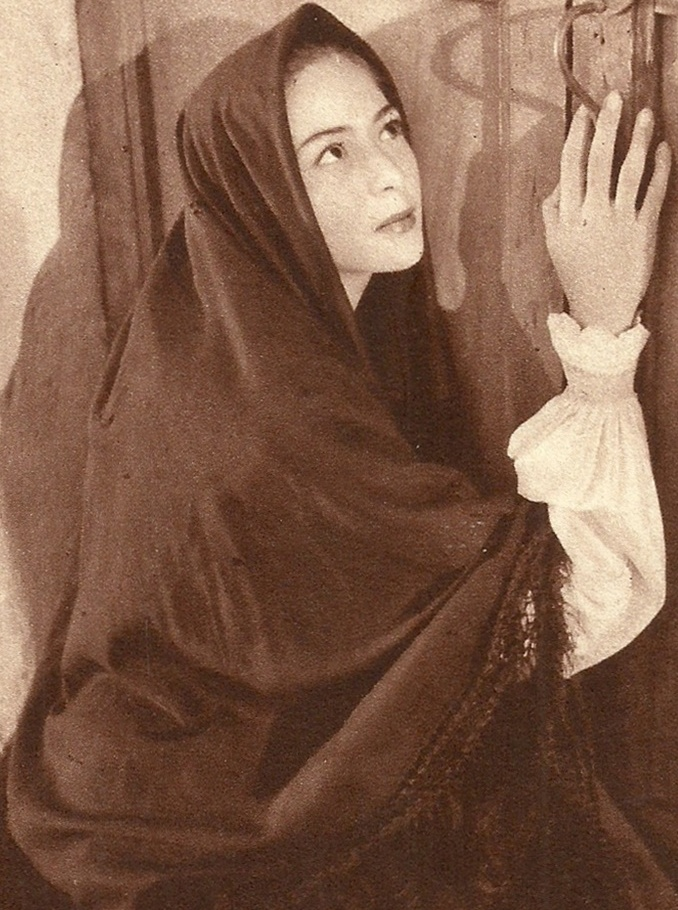
- Domínguez in L'edera (1950)
- Born: Columba Domínguez Alarid; March 4, 1929; Guaymas, Sonora, Mexico
- Died: August 13, 2014 (aged 85); Mexico City, Mexico
- Resting place: Mausoleos del Ángel, Mexico City
- Occupations: Actress, singer, painter
- Years active: 1945–2014
- Partner: Emilio Fernández (1947–1952)

Columba Domínguez Alarid (March 4, 1929 – August 13, 2014) was a Mexican actress, singer and painter. She starred in the film Pueblerina (1949).

== Biography ==
=== Early life ===
Columba Domínguez Alarid was born on March 4, 1929, in Guaymas, Sonora. She moved to Mexico City with her family at a young age. While attending a party with one of her sisters, she was discovered by film director Emilio Fernández, who started her acting career with small roles in films such as La perla (1945) and Río Escondido (1947).

=== Career ===
In 1948, Fernandez gave her the antagonistic role in the film Maclovia (1948), with María Félix. Her performance was praised by critics and, thanks to this film, Fernández entrusted with the leading role that would become her best film: Pueblerina (1948). Thanks to this movie, Columba rapidly rose to stardom and became known worldwide after the film was presented at the Karlovy Vary International Film Festival. In that same year she participated in La Malquerida, with Dolores del Río and Pedro Armendáriz.

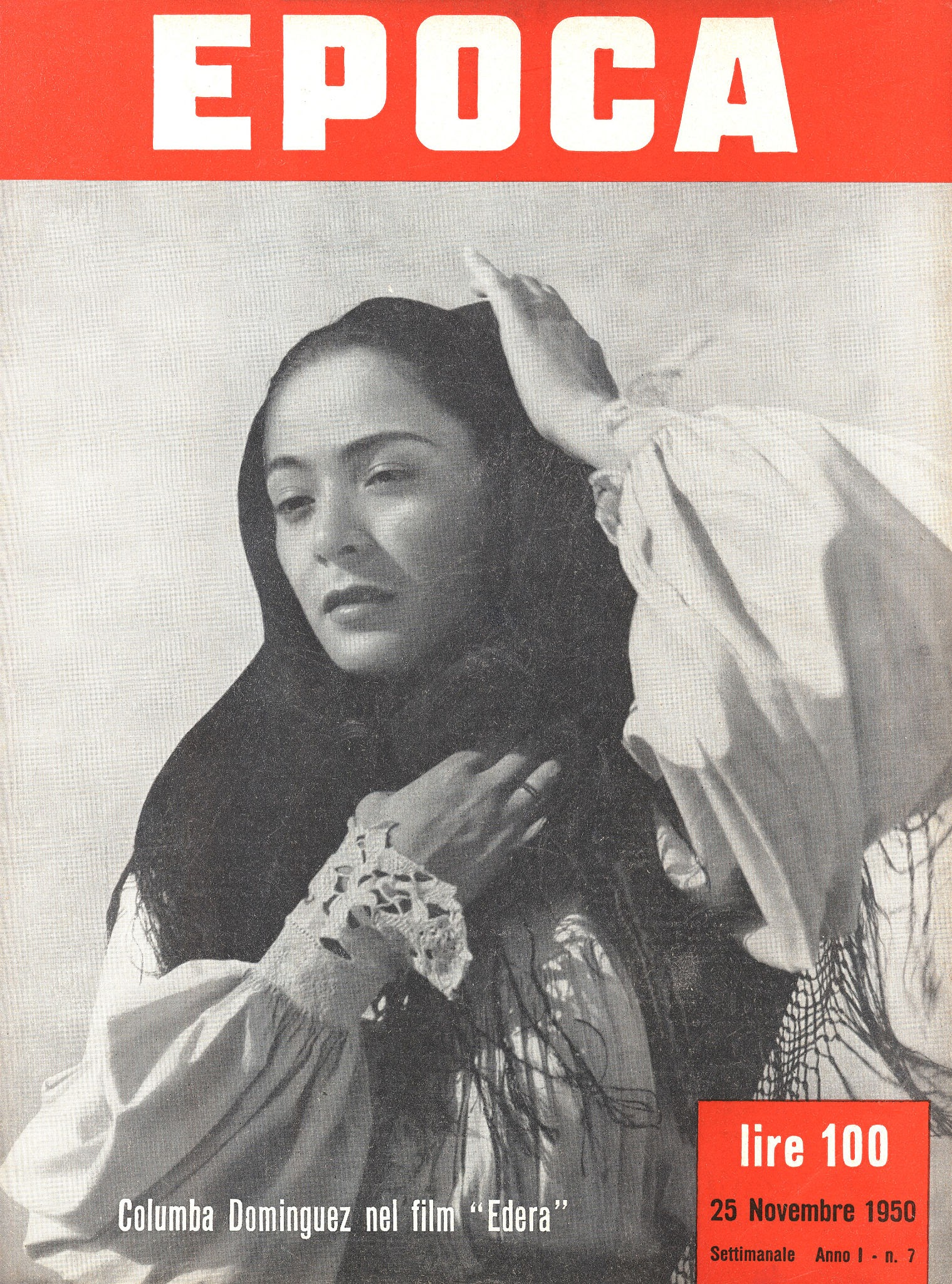
Domínguez in L'edera (1950), photograph published by italian magazine Epoca

Following the success of Pueblerina, Columba was contracted in Italy to appear in the film L'edera (1950). That same year, she filmed Un día de vida (1952), which went unnoticed in Mexico, but became a success in Yugoslavia.

Domínguez separated professionally from Fernandez in 1952, which allowed them to become one first figure and work under the orders of other filmmakers, such as Luis Buñuel (with whom she worked in El río y la muerte (1955), Fernando Méndez, director of the cult film Ladrón de cadáveres (1957), considered one of the best Mexican horror films, and Ismael Rodriguez, she starred in his two masterpieces: Los Hermanos de Hierro (1961) and Ánimas Trujano (1962), with the Japanese actor Toshiro Mifune. In 1962 she participated in El tejedor de milagros, a film that represented Latin America in the IX Berlin Film Festival. Columba also made the first official nude in the Mexican Cinema in the film La virtud desnuda. (1956).

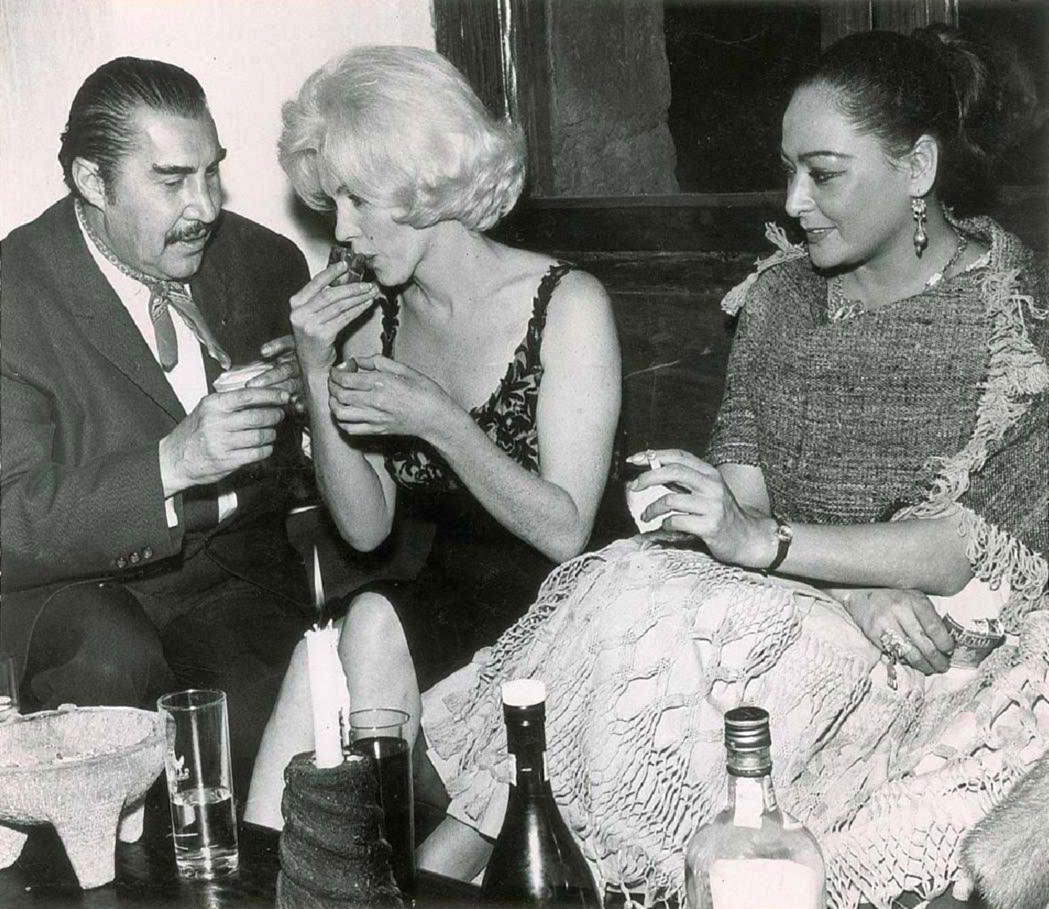
Domínguez with Emilio Fernández and Marilyn Monroe in 1962

In 1961, she recorded an LP record titled La voz dulce y mexicana de Columba Domínguez (The Sweet, Mexican Voice of Columba Domínguez) for the RCA Víctor label, with orchestral arrangements by Mario Ruiz Armengol and Chucho Ferrer. The album has ten tracks and was reissued in digital format by Sony Music in 2012.

On television, Domínguez performed in telenovelas like La tormenta (1967) and El carruaje (1972). Her last television appearance was in Aprendiendo a amar (1979).

After her retirement in 1987, Domínguez devoted herself to dance, humanistic art, painting and piano. In 2008, after more than 20 years of retirement from cinema, the Mexican director Roberto Fiesco returned her to the screen in the short film Paloma. That same year, Dominguez was honored by the International Film Festival de la Frontera, in Ciudad Juarez, at which some of her most representative titles were shown. In 2010, Domínguez made special appearances in the films La cebra and Borrar la memoria, and in 2012 she appeared in the film El último trago.

In May 2013, Domínguez was honored with the Golden Ariel Award for her contributions to the Mexican film industry.

=== Death ===
Domínguez died on August 13, 2014, in the Hospital Ángeles Santelena in Mexico City, from a heart attack, after being hospitalized for several days due to complications from pneumonia. She was entombed at the Mausoleos del Ángel Graveyard, in Mexico City.

== Personal life ==
In 1945, Domínguez was discovered by Emilio Fernandez, who launched her career in film. She and Fernandez began a friendly relationship, which soon led to romance, and Domínguez later claimed that this resulted in their secret marriage. The couple had a daughter, Jacaranda, born in 1952. Personal differences, and infidelities by Fernández, prompted Domínguez to leave him in 1952, taking their daughter with her.

In 1978, Domínguez' daughter Jacaranda died after falling from the fourth floor of a building, in circumstances that were never clarified.

Domínguez and Fernández resumed their relationship several times. She was with him in his last days, despite their having been apart many years, and she did not leave the hospital room until his body was removed. In March 1987 she wrote a book titled Emilio, the Indian that I love which was dedicated to her great love.

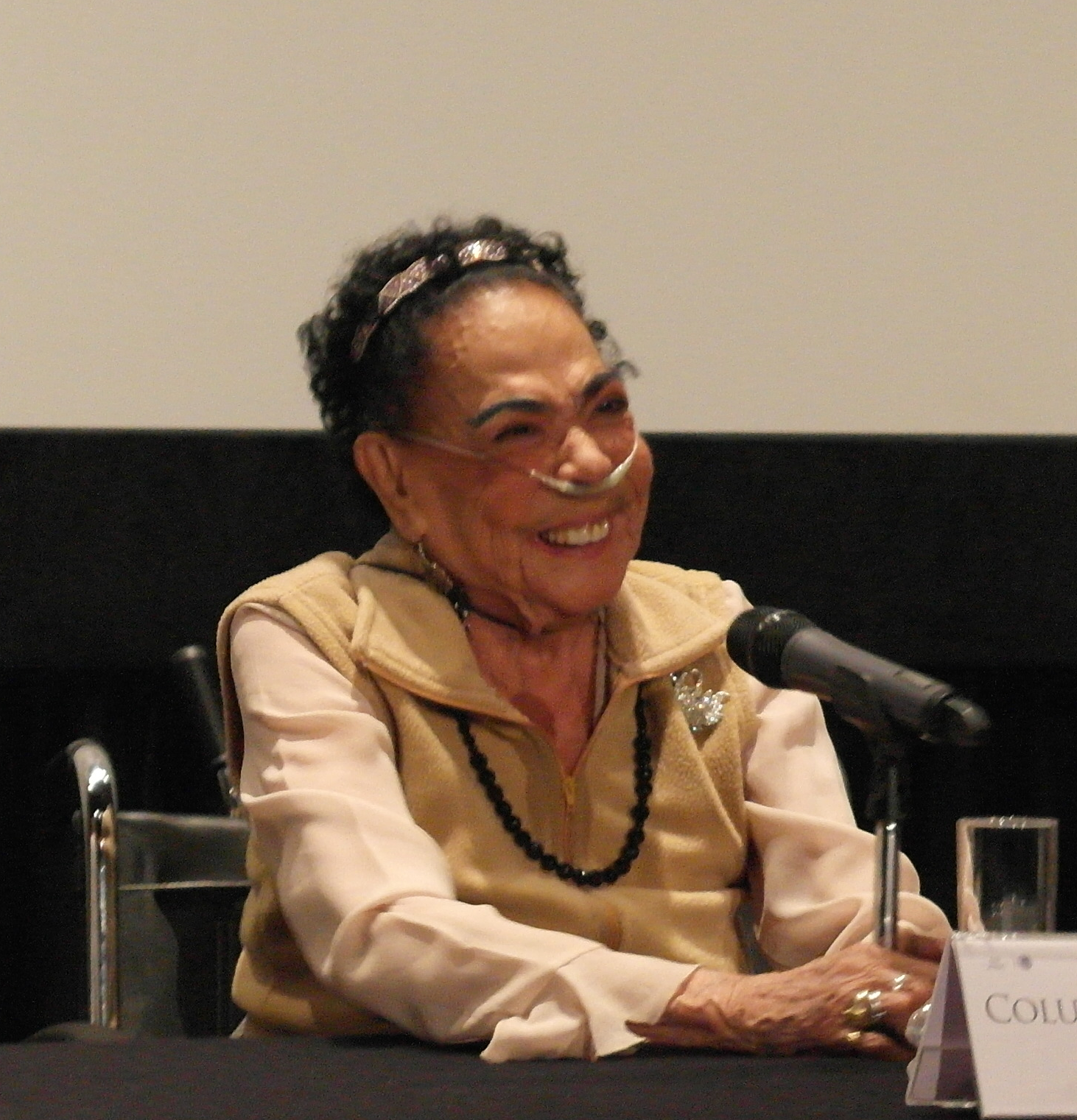
Domínguez in 2013

After Fernández' death in 1986, a dispute over his will erupted, particularly concerning his stunning "fortress" home in the neighborhood of Coyoacan, in the south of Mexico City. Emilio died intestate, and his only surviving daughter, the writer Adela Fernandez y Fernandez, was automatically named the sole heir to the exclusion of Domínguez, who claimed property rights. According to Domínguez, Adela was not a biological daughter of Emilio, and he had never legally adopted her. These details, and the legal situation, were never clarified as Adela died in 2013.

Her "Mexican beauty" was portrayed in paintings by artists including Miguel Covarrubias, Jesús Guerrero Galván, and Diego Rivera.

== Selected filmography ==
=== Features ===
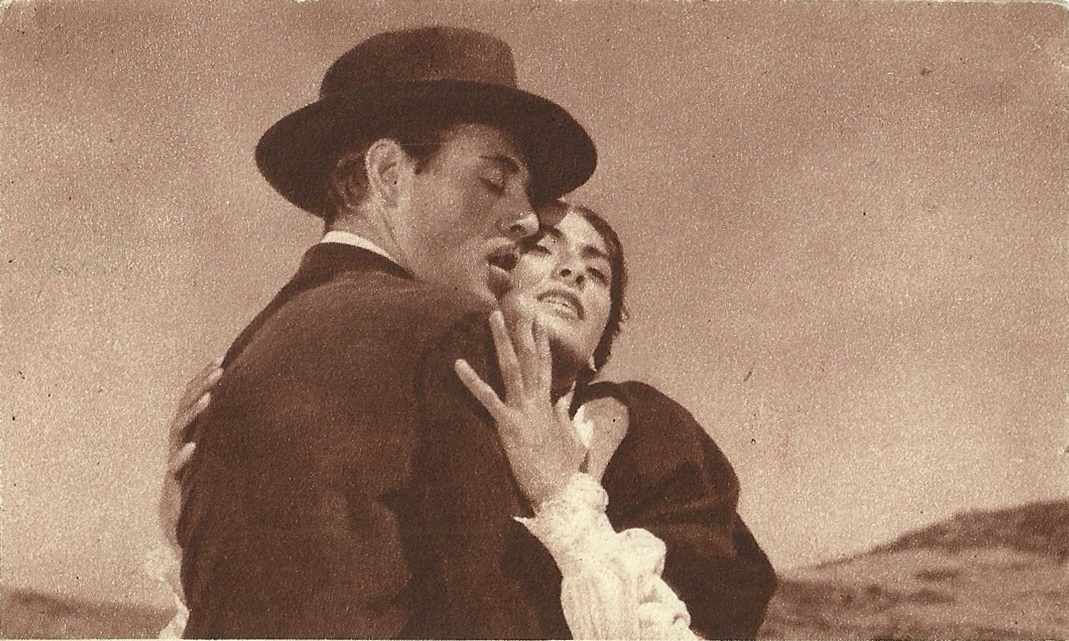
Domínguez with Roldano Lupi in L'edera (1950)

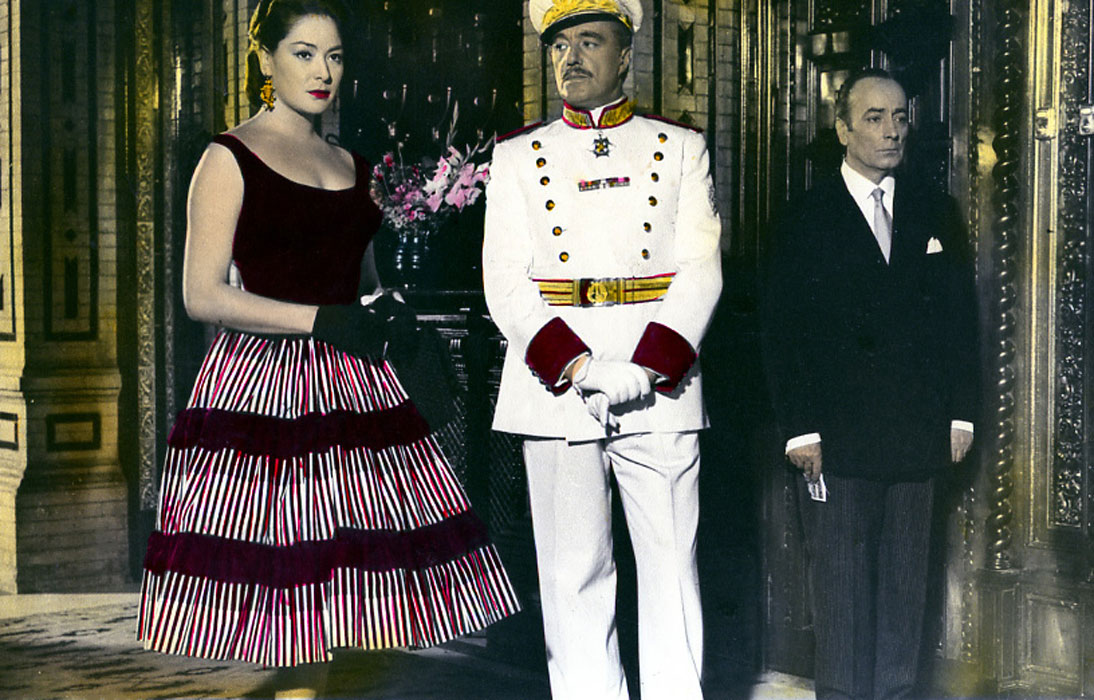
Domínguez with Vittorio De Sica (dressed in white) in Bread, Love and Andalusia (1958)

- The Mulatta of Cordoba (1945)
- I Am a Charro of Rancho Grande (1947)
- La Perla (1947)
- Río Escondido (1948)
- Maclovia (1948)
- Pueblerina (1949)
- The Unloved Woman (1949)
- L'edera (1950)
- Un día de vida (1951)
- La Bienamada (1952)
- When the Fog Lifts (1952)
- Reportaje (1953)
- Women Who Work (1953)
- Historia de un abrigo de mink (1953)
- El río y la muerte (1957)
- Esposas infieles (1956)
- La Virtud Desnuda (1956)
- Ladrón de Cadáveres (1957)
- Cabaret Trágico (1958)
- Pan, amor...y Andalucía (1959)
- Los hermanos Del Hierro (1961)
- Ánimas Trujano (1962)
- Pueblito (1962)
- El tejedor de milagros (1962)
- Paloma herída (1963)
- La Loba (1965)
- Las Momias de Guanajuato (TV) (1966)
- La tormenta (TV) (1967)
- Mi niño Tizoc (1972)
- Los Ricos Tambien Lloran (TV) (1979)
- Aprendiendo a Amar (TV) (1979)
- Una gallina muy ponedora (1982)
- Paloma (2008)
- La Cebra (2010)
- Borrar la Memoria (2010)
- El último trago (2012)
- Ramona (2014)

== Discography ==
With Kitty De Hoyas: Cabaret Trágico (Juan Garcia Esquivel, orchestration, arrangement) (RCA Víctor, 1958)

La voz dulce y mexicana de Columba Domínguez (RCA Víctor, 1961)

Side one:

1. "La pajarera"
2. "Pregones de México"
3. "Nunca"
4. "Se me hizo fácil"
5. "Dime si me quieres"

Side two:

1. "Xochimilco"
2. "Te amaré vida mía"
3. "Nunca, nunca, nunca"
4. "Paloma mensajera"
5. "La barca de Guaymas"
