= The Unloved Woman (1949 film) =

- Directed by: Emilio Fernández
- Written by: Jacinto Benavente; Emilio Fernández; Mauricio Magdaleno
- Produced by: Felipe Subervielle
- Starring: Dolores del Río; Pedro Armendàriz; Columba Domínguez; Roberto Cañedo; Julio Villarreal
- Cinematography: Gabriel Figueroa
- Edited by: Gloria Schoemann
- Music by: Antonio Díaz Conde
- Distributed by: Films Mundiales
- Release date: 16 September 1949
- Running time: 86 minutes
- Country: Mexico
- Language: Spanish

The Unloved Woman (Spanish: La Malquerida) is a 1949 Mexican drama film directed by Emilio Fernández and starring Dolores del Río and Pedro Armendáriz. It is based on the 1913 play of the same title by Jacinto Benavente. The work had already been adapted several times, including the 1940 Spanish film The Unloved Woman.

== Plot summary ==
In the ranch of El Soto lives Raymunda (Dolores del Río) and her daughter, Acacia (Columba Domínguez). After she is widowed, Raymunda marries Esteban (Pedro Armendáriz). What Raymunda does not suspect is that a deep passion has arisen between Acacia and Esteban. The misfortune is that the men who approach Acacia have a tragic end, and because of this, they begin to call her "La Malquerida" ("The Unloved").

== Comments ==
Filmed in 1949 and directed by Emilio "El Indio" Fernández, the story combines an artistic picture of the most important aspect of rural melodrama in the so-called Golden Age of Mexican cinema. Based on the homonymous play written in 1913 by the Spanish playwright Jacinto Benavente, The Unloved Woman is a story of forbidden passions, secrets and scandals unusual for the conservative morals of the time. Having been written and conceived for a theatrical setting makes it easier for Fernandez, who moved the drama to the Mexican countryside (in the state of Guanajuato) and shows life in the countryside. The film was also influenced by the Mexican Revolution, another subgenre widely exploited during the same age of Mexican cinema. There is also the significantly masterful photograph of Gabriel Figueroa and the choice of a cast that features three of the most popular figures of the time, playing the roles that become classics: Dolores del Rio, as the widow, Pedro Armendariz as the prototype of machismo, and finally Columba Dominguez as the seductive beauty, the reason for the discord. The Unloved Woman is an artistic piece that has passed successfully the test of time. A filmic document considered among the best Mexican films of all time.

== See also ==
- La malquerida (telenovela)
