= Pueblerina =

1949 film

- Directed by: Emilio Fernández
- Written by: Emilio Fernández; Mauricio Magdaleno
- Produced by: Óscar Dancigers; Jaime A. Menasce; Felipe Subervielle
- Starring: Columba Domínguez
- Cinematography: Gabriel Figueroa
- Edited by: Jorge Bustos
- Release date: 6 July 1949
- Running time: 111 minutes
- Country: Mexico
- Language: Spanish

Pueblerina is a 1949 Mexican drama film directed by Emilio Fernández. It was entered into the 1949 Cannes Film Festival.

== Synopsis ==
Aurelio returns to his hometown after serving a sentence for avenging the rape of his beloved Paloma by Julio González. Upon arrival, he learns that his mother has died and Paloma is living in exile from the town with her son, a result of the rape. Aurelio seeks to marry Paloma and forget the past, but the evil Julio and his brother Ramiro are not willing to leave them in peace.

== Cast ==
- Columba Domínguez - Paloma
- Roberto Cañedo - Aurelio Rodríguez
- Arturo Soto Rangel - Priest
- Manuel Dondé - Rómulo
- Ismael Pérez - Felipe
- Luis Aceves Castañeda - Ramiro González
- Guillermo Cramer - Julio González
- Enriqueta Reza - Soledad
- Rogelio Fernández - Froilán
- Agustín Fernández - Tiburcio
