= Río Escondido (film) =

- Directed by: Emilio Fernández
- Written by: Emilio Fernández; Mauricio Magdaleno
- Produced by: Raúl de Anda
- Starring: María Félix; Fernando Fernández; Carlos López Moctezuma; Columba Domínguez
- Cinematography: Gabriel Figueroa
- Edited by: Gloria Schoemann
- Music by: Francisco Domínguez
- Distributed by: Producciones Raul de Anda
- Release date: February 12, 1948
- Running time: 110 minutes
- Country: Mexico
- Language: Spanish

Río Escondido is a 1948 Mexican melodrama directed and co-written by Emilio Fernández and starring María Félix, Fernando Fernández, Carlos López Moctezuma, and Domingo Soler.

== Plot ==
The President of México sends Rosaura Salazar (María Félix), a young teacher, to educate a remote rural village known as Río Escondido. Rosaura accepts the mission even though she has a potentially life-threatening heart condition. While walking there in the heat, Rosaura collapses and is saved by Felipe (Fernando Fernández), a student doctor on his way to a nearby town for his social service. At Río Escondido, the tyrannical local boss don Regino Sandoval (Carlos López Moctezuma) initially blocks her plans to reopen the school. Rosaura adopts two children whose mother died from smallpox. After becoming ill himself, don Regino calls for Felipe, who agrees to cure him in exchange for vaccinating the townspeople and letting Rosaura open the school. However, don Regino then insults Rosaura by offering her to become his mistress. She would take the place of the previous schoolteacher (Columba Domínguez), who dies by suicide after learning that don Regino ordered his henchmen to kill her.

Don Regino cuts the town's water supply and kills Rosaura's adopted son when he catches him "stealing" water from a well. Rosaura then defies don Regino's orders by following the tradition of holding an all-night vigil for the boy. In revenge, don Regino breaks into the school at night and attempts to rape Rosaura, but she kills him with a gun that Felipe secretly gave her for protection. Rosaura's strong will has given the townspeople the courage to kill don Regino's henchmen. Rosaura suffers a heart attack. She dictates a letter to the President reporting her victory in Río Escondido and dies after receiving a reply in which the President expresses his gratitude.

== Bibliography ==
Fein, Seth. "From Collaboration to Containment: Hollywood and the International Political Economy of Mexican Cinema after the Second World War". In Hershfield, Joanne; Maciel, David R. (eds.). Mexico's Cinema: A Century of Film and Filmmakers. Wilmington, DE: Scholarly Resources, 1999. pp. 123–163.

Tierney, Dolores. Emilio Fernández: Pictures in the Margins. Manchester and New York: Manchester UP, 2007.
