= Pedro Armendáriz =

Mexican actor (1912–1963)

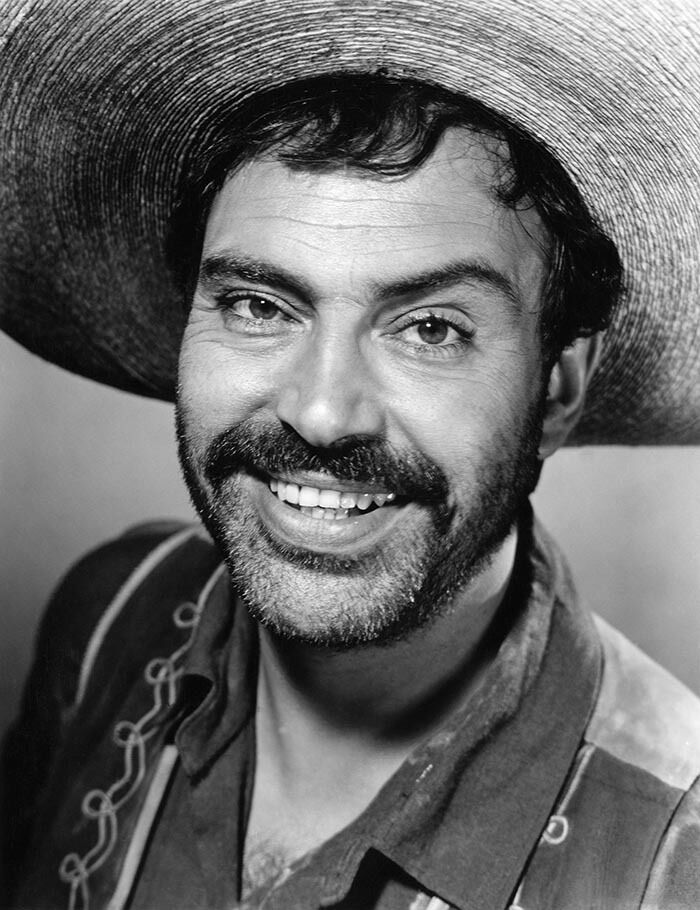
- Armendáriz in 3 Godfathers (1948)
- Born: Pedro Gregorio Armendáriz Hastings; May 9, 1912; Mexico City, Mexico
- Died: June 18, 1963 (aged 51); Los Angeles, California, U.S.
- Burial place: Panteón Jardín, Mexico City, Mexico
- Citizenship: Mexico; United States
- Education: California Polytechnic State University, San Luis Obispo
- Occupation: Actor
- Years active: 1935–1963
- Spouse: Carmelita Bohr (m. 1938)
- Children: Pedro Jr.; Carmen
- Relatives: Gloria Marín (cousin)

Pedro Gregorio Armendáriz Hastings (May 9, 1912 – June 18, 1963) was a Mexican actor. With the actresses Dolores del Río and María Félix, he was one of the best-known Latin American movie stars of the 1940s and 1950s. He won the Ariel Award for Best Actor twice (out of six nominations), for The Pearl (1948) and Soledad's Shawl, a year after its 1952 release.

== Early life and education ==
Armendáriz was born in Mexico City to a Mexican father, Pedro Armendáriz García Conde, and an American mother, Adela Hastings. He was also the cousin of actress Gloria Marín. Armendáriz and his younger brother Francisco lived with their uncle Henry Hastings Sr. in Laredo, Texas, after their mother died. He later studied in California, attending the California Polytechnic State University from September 1928 to May 1932. At Cal Poly, he studied mechanics and in May 1931 graduated from the academic course of the school. He remained an additional year as a freshman in the Junior College division, but in 1932 returned to Mexico after the end of the school year. While at Cal Poly, Armendáriz was active in student activities, including editing the student newspaper and the student yearbook and acting in several student dramatic productions.

== Career ==
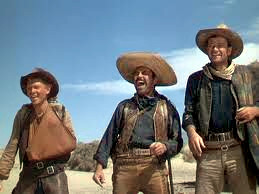
Armendáriz (center) with Harry Carey Jr. and John Wayne in 3 Godfathers (1948)

When Armendáriz finished his studies, he moved to Mexico, where he worked for the railroad, as a tour guide, and as a journalist for the bilingual magazine México Real. He was discovered by film director Miguel Zacarías when Armendáriz recited a soliloquy from Hamlet to an American tourist. His meeting with the director Emilio Fernández was providential, whereupon the actor and director began working in numerous films: Soy puro mexicano (1942), Flor silvestre (1942) and specially María Candelaria (1943) were the first films of intense common path. Under the guidance of Emilio Fernández, Pedro Armendáriz developed the film personality traits of a strong nationalist; often, he played tough and manly men, indigenous, peasants and revolutionaries. Amendáriz repeatedly portrayed Pancho Villa and played opposite actresses such as Dolores del Río and María Félix.

With Dolores del Río, Amendáriz formed one of the most legendary couples of the Mexican cinema. María Candelaria provided Armendáriz with international visibility. The film was awarded the Palme d'Or at the 1946 Cannes Film Festival. Other prominent titles where Armendáriz appeared with Dolores del Río were Las Abandonadas (1944), Bugambilia (1944) and La Malquerida (1949). Maria Felix was his other partner in such films as Enamorada (1946) or Maclovia (1948).

In the late 40s, he made the jump to Hollywood by the hand of John Ford. Armendáriz was a favorite of Ford, appearing in three of his films: The Fugitive (1947), Fort Apache and 3 Godfathers (both 1948).

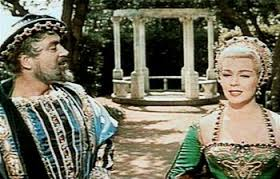
Armendáriz with Lana Turner in Diane (1956)

Besides his career in the Mexican cinema, Armendáriz made a remarkable career in Hollywood and Europe. His other prominent films in Hollywood were: We Were Strangers (1949, directed by John Huston), The Torch (1950), Border River (1954), The Conqueror (1956) and Diane (1956), among others. In Europe, highlighted his participation in the film Lucrèce Borgia (1953), filmed in France. In Mexico, his participation highlighted such notable films such as El Bruto (1953, directed by Luis Buñuel), La Cucaracha (1959) and La Bandida (1962).

Armendáriz's last appearance was in the second James Bond film, From Russia with Love (1963), as Bond's ally, Kerim Bey. Armendáriz was terminally ill with cancer during the filming of From Russia with Love, and towards the end of shooting he was too ill to perform his part; his final scenes were performed by his double, director Terence Young. Armendáriz died four months before the release of the film.

== Personal life ==
Armendáriz was married to actress Carmelita Bohr (née Pardo) with whom he had one son and one daughter. His son Pedro Armendariz Bohr (April 6, 1940 – December 26, 2011), also became an actor and appeared in the James Bond film Licence to Kill (1989). His daughter, TV producer Carmen Armendáriz Bohr (b. 1946, Mexico City), was married and then divorced Michel Pierson Cuadra, a Nicaraguan national.

=== Illness and death ===
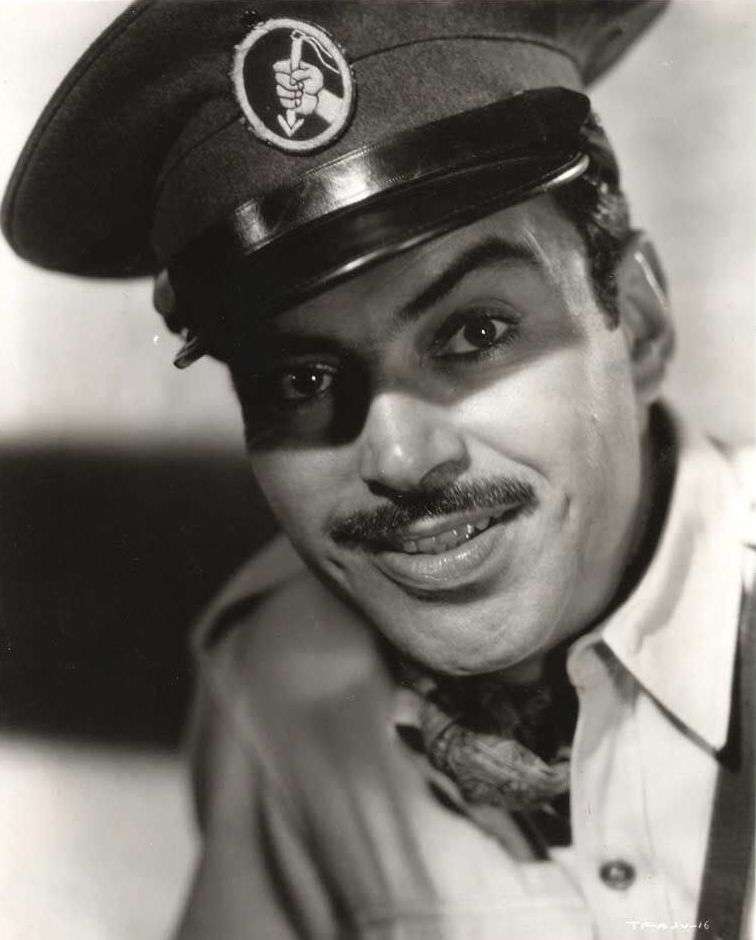
Pedro Armendáriz in 1947.

In 1956, Armendáriz had a role in The Conqueror, produced by Howard Hughes. It was filmed in the state of Utah at the time when the US government was conducting atmospheric nuclear testing in neighboring Nevada. Within 25 years, 91 of the 220 people involved in the production (41%) developed cancer, 46 of whom died of cancer or complications related to it.

Armendáriz began to suffer pain in his hips; years later it was discovered that he had neck cancer. He learned his condition was terminal while at UCLA Medical Center in Los Angeles, California, and reportedly endured great pain to film From Russia with Love in order to assure his family financial resources.

On June 18, 1963, Armendáriz died by suicide by shooting himself in the chest with a gun he had smuggled into the hospital. He was 51 years old. He is buried in the Panteón Jardín cemetery in Mexico City, Mexico.

== Filmography ==
=== Hollywood ===
Year	Title	Role	Notes
1947	The Fugitive	A lieutenant of police	a.k.a. El Fugitivo (Mexico)
1948	Fort Apache	Sgt. Beaufort	as Pedro Armendáriz
1948	3 Godfathers	Pedro "Pete" Roca Fuerte	as Pedro Armendáriz
1949	Tulsa	Jim Redbird	
1949	We Were Strangers	Armando Ariete	
1950	The Torch	José Juan Reyes	a.k.a. Del odio nace el amor (Mexico)
1954	Border River	General Eduardo Calleja	
1955	The Littlest Outlaw	Gen. Torres	
1956	Diane	King Francis I	
1956	The Conqueror	Jamuga	as Pedro Armendáriz
1957	The Big Boodle	Col. Mastegui	as Pedro Armendáriz
1959	Little Savage	El Tiburón	
1959	The Wonderful Country	Cipriano Castro	
1961	Francis of Assisi	The Sultan	
1963	Captain Sindbad	El Kerim	as Pedro Armendáriz

=== British cinema ===
Year	Title	Role	Notes
1957	Manuela	Mario Constanza	
1963	From Russia with Love	Ali Kerim Bey	Released posthumously

=== Italian cinema ===
Year	Title	Role	Notes
1955	Tom Toms of Mayumba	Martinez	
1957	Uomini e lupi	Giovanni	a.k.a. The Wolves
1962	Arrivano i titani	Cadmo	a.k.a. My Son, the Hero (USA)

=== French cinema ===
Year	Title	Role	Notes
1953	Lucrèce Borgia	César Borgia	a.k.a. Lucretia Borgia
1955	Fortune carrée	Igricheff	

=== Mexican cinema ===
Year	Title	Role	Notes
1935	Rosario	Enrique	
1936	Irma la mala		
1936	María Elena	Eduardo	
1937	Las cuatro milpas		
1937	Jalisco nunca pierde	Pedro González	
1937	Poppy of the Road	Juan Padilla	
1938	Mi candidato	Pancho García	
1938	La Adelita	Sabino Estrada	
1938	Los millones de Chaflán	Antonio	
1938	Canto a mi tierra	Antonio	
1939	El indio	Felipe	
1939	The Queen of the River	Pescador joven	
1939	La china Hilaria	Apolonio	
1939	Una luz en mi camino	Daniel	
1939	With Villa's Veterans	Mayor Pedro Mondragón	
1940	Los olvidados de Dios	Zenón Rojas	
1940	Poor Devil	Raúl Solares	
1940	El charro negro	Ramón	
1940	Mala yerba	Chuy Rodríguez	
1940	El jefe máximo		
1941	El secreto del sacerdote		
1941	El zorro de Jalisco	Leonardo	
1941	Neither Blood nor Sand	Frank	
1942	Allá en el bajío	Juan Hernández	
1942	La epopeya del camino	Raúl	
1942	Del rancho a la capital	Pedro Rodríguez	
1942	Simón Bolívar	General Briceño Méndez	
1942	La isla de la pasión (Clipperton)	El Toro	
1942	I'm a Real Mexican	Guadalupe Padilla	
1943	Wild Flower	Jose Luis Castro	
1943	Land of Passions	Porfirio	
1943	Guadalajara	Pedro	
1943	Red Konga	Federico Robles	
1943	Another Dawn	Octavio	
1944	María Candelaria	Lorenzo Rafael	
1944	The War of the Pastries	Antonio del Valle	
1944	El corsario negro	El corsario negro	
1944	Las calaveras del terror	Rolando	
1944	Alma de bronce		
1945	Entre hermanos		
1945	Las Abandonadas	Juan Gomez	nominated — Ariel Award for Best Actor
1945	El Capitán Malacara	Capitán Leonardo Buenrostro	
1945	Bugambilia	Ricardo Rojas	
1946	Rayando el sol	Pedro, adulto	
1946	Enamorada	Gen. José Juan Reyes	nominated — Ariel Award for Best Actor
1947	La casa colorada	Gaspar	
1947	Albur de amor		
1947	The Pearl	Quino	Ariel Award for Best Actor
1948	Juan Charrasqueado	Juan Robledo / Juan Charrasqueado	
1948	En la hacienda de la flor	Juan Robledo - el hijo de Juan Charrasqueado	
1948	Maclovia	José María	
1949	Al caer la tarde	Sebastian del Llano	
1949	El abandonado	Dámian López	
1949	The Unloved Woman	Esteban	
1949	El charro y la dama	Pedro Meneses	
1950	Vuelve Pancho Villa	Pancho Villa	
1950	La loca de la casa	José María Cruz	
1950	Por la puerta falsa	Bernardo Celis	
1950	Rosauro Castro	Rosauro Castro	nominated — Ariel Award for Best Actor
1951	Tierra baja	Manelic	
1951	Bodas de fuego	Rodolfo Carrera	
1951	Camino del infierno	Pedro Uribe	
1951	Por querer a una mujer	José Renteria	
1951	She and I	Pedro Múñoz	
1952	The Three Happy Compadres	Baldomero Mireles	
1952	La noche avanza	Marcos Arizmendi	
1952	Carne de presidio	Pablo González	
1952	El Rebozo de Soledad	Roque Suazo	Ariel Award for Best Actor
1953	Lovers of Toledo	Don Alvaro Blas Basto y Mosquera	
1953	El Bruto	Pedro	
1954	Reto a la vida	Diego Maldonado	
1954	Mulata	Captain Martín	
1954	La rebelión de los colgados	Cándido Costa	nominated — Ariel Award for Best Actor
1954	Dos mundos y un amor	Ricardo Anaya	
1956	La Escondida	Felipe Rojano	
1956	Canasta de cuentos mexicanos	Carlos Cosio	segment "Tigresa, La"
1956	Viva revolución		
1957	La mujer que no tuvo infancia	Lic. Alberto Garza Cifuentes	
1957	Los salvajes	Pedro Matías	
1957	Así era Pancho Villa	Pancho Villa	
1958	Quiero ser artista	Himself	
1959	Ando volando bajo	Pedro	
1959	Café Colón	General Sebastián Robles	
1959	Las Señoritas Vivanco	Gen. Inocencio Torrentera	
1959	El zarco	El Zarco	
1959	Flor de mayo	Pepe Gamboa	
1959	Sed de amor	Pedro Ortiz	
1959	La Cucaracha	Coronel Valentín Razo	
1959	Yo pecador	Francisco Bracamontes	
1959	Hambre nuestra de cada día	Macario Férnandez	
1960	Los desarraigados	Joe Pacheco	
1960	Verano violento	Francisco Peña	
1960	Dos hijos desobedientes	Pedro	
1960	Calibre 44	Don Pedro	
1960	Pancho Villa y la Valentina	Pancho Villa	
1960	Aquí está Pancho Villa	Pancho Villa	
1960	El impostor	Professor César Rubio	
1960	Los hermanos del hierro	General	
1960	La cárcel de Cananea	Pedro	
1961	El indulto	Lucas Sánchez Parrondo	
1962	El tejedor de milagros	Señor cura	
1962	Los valientes no mueren	Pedro	
1962	La Bandida	Roberto Herrera	

== Bibliography ==
- García, Gustavo (1997). Pedro Armendáriz. Clío. ISBN 968-6932-96-8.
- Tierney, Dolores (2012). "Latino Acting On Screen: Pedro Armendáriz Performs Mexicanness in Three John Ford Films". Revista Canadiense de Estudios Hispanicos, 37 (1). pp. 111–134. ISSN 0384-8167.
