= María Candelaria =

1944 film by Emilio Fernández

María Candelaria (Xochimilco)
- Directed by: Emilio Fernández
- Written by: Emilio Fernández
- Produced by: Agustin J. Fink
- Starring: Dolores del Río; Pedro Armendáriz; Alberto Galán; Miguel Inclán; Julio Ahuet
- Cinematography: Gabriel Figueroa
- Edited by: Jorge Bustos
- Music by: Francisco Domínguez
- Distributed by: Films Mundiales; Metro-Goldwyn-Mayer
- Release date: 1944
- Running time: 96 minutes
- Country: Mexico
- Language: Spanish

María Candelaria is a 1944 Mexican melodrama film written and directed by Emilio Fernández and starring Dolores del Río and Pedro Armendáriz. It was the first Mexican film to be screened at the Cannes International Film Festival where it won the Grand Prix (now known as the Palme d'Or) becoming the first Latin American film to do so. María Candelaria would later win a Silver Ariel award for Best Cinematography.

The film came to be regarded as one of Fernández's best works, in which he portrays the indigenous people of Mexico with innocence and dignity. Fernández has said that he wrote an original version of the plot on 13 napkins while sitting in a restaurant. He was anxious because he was dating Dolores del Río and could not afford to buy her a birthday present. The film was originally titled Xochimilco and the protagonist was named María del Refugio.

Major themes in the film include melodrama, indigenousness, nationalism, and the beauty of Mexico. María Candelaria is one of Mexico's most beloved films of all time, and it was ranked thirty-seventh among the top 100 films of Mexican cinema.

== Plot ==
A young journalist presses an old artist to display the portrait of a naked indigenous woman that he has in his study. As the artist begins to tell the story behind the painting, the action becomes a flashback to Xochimilco, Mexico in 1909, right before the Mexican Revolution. Xochimilco is an area with beautiful landscapes inhabited mostly by indigenous people.

The woman in the painting is María Candelaria (Dolores del Río), a young indigenous woman shunned by her own people for being the daughter of a prostitute. She and her lover, Lorenzo Rafael, face constant exclusion and threats. They receive criticism and condemnation from the townspeople. They are honest and hardworking, yet nothing ever goes right for them. Don Damián, a jealous Mestizo store owner who wants María for himself, prevents María and Lorenzo from getting married and pursues Maria over a minor debt. Maria owes Don money for goods. She tries to sell him her flowers and Lorenzo tries to sell him vegetables but he refuses to take them. Instead, he kills a piglet that María and Lorenzo planned to raise and sell for profit so that they would have enough money to get married. When María contracts malaria, Don Damián refuses to give the couple the quinine necessary to fight the disease. Lorenzo breaks into the store to steal the medicine and takes a wedding dress for María. Lorenzo goes to prison for stealing and María agrees to model for the painter to pay for his release. The artist begins painting her portrait and then asks her to pose nude, which she refuses to do.

The artist finishes the painting with the nude body of another woman. When the people of Xochimilco see the painting, they assume it is María Candelaria. They think that she turned out just like her mother so they stone her to death, and burn her house, while Lorenzo watches helplessly.

Finally, Lorenzo escapes from prison to carry María's lifeless body through Xochimilco's Canal of the Dead.

Similarly, the portrayal of prejudiced villagers - primarily shrill and bullying women - is not particularly subtle, though the interactions with the priest reveal a more complex and fluctuating negotiation between narrowminded superstition and (in this context) a relatively enlightened form of Christianity. The village women's malevolent temperament (all scowlers giving the evil eye) is contrasted with María Candelaria's 'innocent' beauty - "the essence of authentic Mexican beauty," according to the painter (Alberto Galán), who is also crucial in the tragedy that unfolds.

== Cast ==
=== Main cast ===
- Dolores del Río as María Candelaria: A beautiful, indigenous Mexican woman who has many misfortunes befall her throughout the film. The daughter of a shunned prostitute.
- Pedro Armendáriz as Lorenzo Rafael: María Candelaria's lover and only consistent supporter.
- Alberto Galán as Painter: The narrator of the story and creator of the painting that ultimately leads to María's death. The character is based on muralist Diego Rivera.
- Margarita Cortés as Lupe: A young woman in the community who is jealous of María because she wants to be with Lorenzo Rafael. She is instrumental in the mob of townspeople who eventually stone María to death.
- Miguel Inclán as don Damián: A store owner who exploits indigenous people and wants María for himself.

=== Supporting cast ===
- Beatriz Ramos as Journalist
- Rafael Icardo as Priest
- Julio Ahuet as José Alfonso
- Lupe Inclán as Gossip
- Salvador Quiroz as Judge
- Nieves as Model
- Elda Loza as Model
- Lupe Garnica as Model
- Arturo Soto Rangel as Doctor
- David Valle González as Court secretary
- José Torvay as Police
- Enrique Zambrano as Doctor
- Alfonso Jiménez "Kilómetro"
- Irma Torres
- Lupe del Castillo

== Production ==
María Candelaria benefited from a time of commercial success in the Mexican film industry in the 1940s and 1950s. Fernández and Figueroa had worked together previously, and they shared a similar vision for the film. In addition to the experienced team of producers, the film benefited from Dolores del Río's success as an actress through the star system.

The film was the gift that Emilio Fernández offered to Dolores del Río, to compensate for his mistreatment of del Río during their filming of Flor silvestre (1943). Emilio's "bronco" temperament had surfaced on several occasions, and the actress had nearly left the film. The pleas of their co-workers, and her high sense of professionalism, convinced del Río to return. However, her relationship with the director had become distant. On Good Friday 1943, del Río's birthday, was the occasion chosen by the filmmaker to find the desired reconciliation. In addition to needing her as an actress, Fernández began to love her as a woman. In his biographical account of the actress, writer David Ramón relates:

"When it was Emilio Fernández's turn to give her his gift, he got close up to Dolores and took a bunch of napkins with writings, and he practically threw them to her and said: This is your birthday present, a history of cinema. I hope you'll like it, it's your next film, it's called Xochimilco. It's yours, it's your property, if somebody wants to buy it, they'll buy it from you."

With the generous gift and all, Dolores had her doubts. She said: "First a rural woman ... And now, an Indian woman, you want me to play an Indian? I ... barefooted?"

The director of photography was Gabriel Figueroa. The art director was Jorge Fernández. The editor was Gloria Schoemann. The music was done by Francisco Domínguez, and the sound was done by Howard Randall, Jesús González Gancy, and Manuel Esperón.

== Reception ==
"María Candelaria" has been analyzed by many scholars and historians for its representation of "the indígena". Many critics praise this and Fernández's other films for representing the indigenous people in a more positive light, while others claim he stereotypes them as simple. "María Candelaria" is Fernández's prime example of what he believes indígenas demonstrates. Author Joanne Hershfield claimed that Fernández and the Mexican cinema industry reproduced and reinforced stereotypes that artist Diego Rivera (whom the painter in the movie is based on) created in his paintings − which were that indigenous people were "like children who had to be led to social (and revolutionary) consciousness by the intellectual mestizo elite".

The representation of María as the embodiment of an "indígena" results in a narrative that shows how during this time period, contact between criollos and indígenas resulted in suffering for the indigenous person. The film has been both criticized and praised for its insinuations about the indigenous population and the topic of assimilation.

"María Candelaria" has sparked much debate and analysis over the image of indigenous people as portrayed in Golden Age Mexican cinema.

== Awards ==
Year	Ceremony	Award	Result	Winner
1946	Festival de Cannes	Grand Prix for "Best feature film"	Won	
1946	Premios Ariel	Special Silver Award for "Best Cinematography"	Won	Gabriel Figueroa
