= Gloria Schoemann =

- Born: 24 July 1910; Mexico City, Mexico
- Died: 1 September 2006 (aged 96); Mexico City, Mexico
- Occupation: Film editor
- Years active: 1942–1983 (film)

Gloria Schoemann (1910–2006) was a Mexican film editor. Her over 40 years of career from 1942 to 1983 spanned many influential moments in the development of Mexico's national cinema, including the Golden Age of Mexican Cinema and the Nuevo Cine Mexicano ("Mexican New Cinema") in the 1970s and 1980s. During her career, Schoemann edited over 200 films, received 11 award nominations and was the recipient of 5 awards and distinctions.

== Early life ==
Schoemann was born in Mexico City, Mexico, to parents Alfredo Schoemann and Natalia Vargas. The middle child of three siblings, Schoemann had an older brother named Alfredo "Tello" and a younger sister, Rosa. At the age of 5, Schoemann was orphaned when her mother fell ill and died. A year prior, her father Alfredo, a German businessman living in Mexico, travelled frequently for work and one day failed to return. The children were then cared for by their maternal grandmother and aunts.

== Career ==
At the age of 20, Schoemann moved to Los Angeles to pursue a career in the Hollywood film industry. In her early days in Los Angeles, Schoemann worked as a shorthand typist as well as an extra in background roles in Hollywood films. Schoemann eventually landed a supporting role in a film alongside actor José Mojica, whom she would later collaborate with in her editing career.

Schoemann moved back to Mexico where she continued working in film. While Schoemann was working as an actor on Chano Urueta's film Men of the Sea she first encountered a Moviola machine and was inspired to start leaning the art of editing. Schoemann began learning editing from Emilio Gómez Muriel and while transitioning into her career as an editor, she collaborated uncredited with Muriel on many films while she honed her skills.

Schoemann then went on to work as an editor on a large number of films in Mexico, working with many notable filmmakers including Emilio Fernández, Luis Buñuel, Julio Bracho, Miguel M. Delgado, Gilberto Martínez Solares, Roberto Gavaldón and Alejandro Galindo. Schoemann was nominated for the Ariel Award for Best Editing eleven times and won the award three times. Her three wins were for Enamorada (1947), The Boy and the Fog (1954), and La rebelión de los colgados (1955). She also won the Salvador Toscano Medal in 1993 and was awarded the Special Golden Ariel in 2004.

== Legacy and quotes ==
Despite Schoemann's significant contributions to Mexican cinema, like many women of her generation, she was less known as other people in her position. Schoemann's career spanned many decades, and she worked on an unusually high number of films, but today there is little written about Schoemann and her work.

After winning the Salvador Toscano Medal, Schoemann was quoted as saying, "I always loved cinema, I saw everything, so I realized the good and the bad; I never sat down to watch a movie from the point of view of my work. I have given myself completely to it. And the editing work is hard, but for me it is the most exciting, interesting and important aspect of cinema."

== Selected filmography ==
- I Danced with Don Porfirio (1942)
- Another Dawn (1943)
- Maria Candelaria (1944)
- The War of the Pastries (1944)
- The Mulatta of Cordoba (1945)
- Lightning in the South (1943)
- Adam, Eve and the Devil (1945)
- Cantaclaro (1946)
- Love Makes Them Crazy (1946)
- Gran Casino (1946)
- Pepita Jiménez (1946)
- The Associate (1946)
- Enamorada (1946)
- Don't Marry My Wife (1947)
- Voices of Spring (1947)
- Flor de caña (1948)
- The Unloved Woman (1949)
- Lola Casanova (1949)
- Immaculate (1950)
- Black Angustias (1950)
- Between Your Love and Heaven (1950)
- Get Your Sandwiches Here (1951)
- Maria Islands (1951)
- Radio Patrol (1951)
- Forever Yours (1952)
- When the Fog Lifts (1952)
- The Trace of Some Lips (1952)
- Captain Scarlett (1953)
- Untouched (1954)
- Father Against Son (1955)
- The Murderer X (1955)
- Arm in Arm Down the Street (1956)
- Where the Circle Ends (1956)
- The Medallion Crime (1956)
- Every Child a Cross to Bear (1957)
- The Boxer (1958)
- So Loved Our Fathers (1964)

== Bibliography ==
- Edwards, Gwynne. A Companion to Luis Buñuel. Tamesis Books, 2005.
