= Mulata (film) =

- Directed by: Gilberto Martínez Solares
- Written by: Roberto Olivencia Márquez; Gilberto Martínez Solares
- Produced by: Oscar J. Brooks; Felipe Mier
- Starring: Ninón Sevilla; Pedro Armendáriz; René Cardona
- Cinematography: Agustín Martínez Solares
- Music by: Manuel Esperón
- Release date: July 16, 1954 (México)
- Running time: 80 min
- Country: Mexico
- Language: Spanish

Mulata (Mulatta) is a Mexican drama film directed by Gilberto Martínez Solares. It was released in 1954 and starring Ninón Sevilla and Pedro Armendáriz.

== Plot ==
In the Havana port, two mulatto children, Mateo (Ricardo Román) and Caridad (Ninón Sevilla) grow together. She is the daughter of a white man who died in a shipwreck, and a black laundress of African origin. Over the years, Mateo falls for Caridad, but she is in love with a Mexican captain, Martin (Pedro Armendáriz), who met her at the port. The captain was also in love with Caridad and offers to live together and she accepts. Caridad work in a cabaret in the port and the owner, Guevara (René Cardona), is attracted to her, and in a moment of jealousy, tries to kill Martin. Martin falls in financial trouble and has to mortgage his boat to Guevara. When Martin returns to Veracruz, Mexico, Guevara considers himself the new owner of Caridad.

== Cast ==
- Ninón Sevilla ... Caridad
- Pedro Armendáriz ... Captain Martín
- René Cardona ... Guevara
- Ricardo Román ... Mateo
- Fanny Schiller ... Doña Rosario
- Ramón Valdés ... "Marinero" (uncredited)

== Reviews ==
Mulata is not one of the classic melodramas of Ninón Sevilla. The film does not contain the extravagant elements that make the indisputable classics Victimas del Pecado, Aventurera and Sensualidad; does not have the spectacular musical numbers in large series and complex choreography, which are found in almost all her films; and contains not humor like in Club de señoritas. But somehow Mulata is probably the film that is closer to the cultural roots of Sevilla, ethnic and social concerns and the varied and different forms of love that made her life so rich. Adapted from Mulatilla: Black Stamp, a novel by the Uruguayan writer Roberto Márquez Olivencia, the action takes place now in Cuba and tells the story of Caridad (a name that echoes the name of the Virgin patron of the island), the beautiful daughter a black slave who has to fight against those who exploit high positions, and men who only want her as a sexual object. Her life was marked by tragedy and she will be physically abused, betrayed and forced into prostitution. The story is told in flashback, from the memories of the Mexican sailor. The character is played of brutal way by the actor Pedro Armendariz. There is a long sequence on the beach that covers a celebration of a ritual dance of Santeria, the Yoruba religion shown by Ninon as important in her films as Victimas del Pecado and Yambaó. By 1954, the sequence is a strange and audacious mix of ethnography and sensationalism.

The film shows a sequence where several dancers resembling be naked during a ritual. In this regard, Ninon Sevilla revealed: Pedro Armendáriz had just returned from France, where he filmed "Lucrece Borgia" and counted me that in a scene rubbed a bunch of grapes on the breasts of an actress who was lying on a table and that down there was an actor who drank the juice of the grapes. And that only they could happen to the French. Mmmm I said, in this movie are going to show to the French that here in Mexico too there is imagination. I sent for a bag of black nylon panties in every sizes. On the beach scene did you put to all the dancers, so when lifted their legs, it seemed that they did not bring anything. This goes for the French.
