= Take Me in Your Arms (film) =

- Directed by: Julio Bracho
- Written by: José Carbo; Julio Bracho
- Produced by: Guillermo Calderón; Pedro Arturo Calderón
- Starring: Ninón Sevilla; Armando Silvestre; Carlos Lopez Moctezuma; Andrea Palma
- Cinematography: Gabriel Figueroa
- Music by: Manuel Esperóno; Antonio Diaz Conde
- Distributed by: Producciones Calderón
- Release date: April 30, 1954
- Running time: 98 min.
- Country: Mexico
- Language: Spanish

Take Me in Your Arms (in Spanish Llévame en tus brazos) is a 1954 Mexican drama film directed by Julio Bracho. Starred by Ninón Sevilla and Armando Silvestre.

== Plot ==
In a little fisher's village in the Papaloapan River lives the fisher Pedro (Andrés Soler) and his two daughters Rita (Ninón Sevilla) and Martha (Rosenda Monteros). Rita loves a young man named José (Armando Silvestre) who has been fired from a sugar mill for organizing a strike. So, he and Rita can't marry soon. After a good fishing, all in the town celebrate a party. But Don Antonio (Julio Villarreal), the owner of the sugar mill, comes to collect Pedro the money that he lent him for a boat. As Pedro can't pay him, Don Antonio asks as pay to one of his daughters. Rita listens and she decides to go with Don Antonio to save her father and her sister. Before leaving, Rita makes love with José. When she leaves, José thinks that she has left him.

== Cast ==
- Ninón Sevilla as Rita Rosales
- Armando Silvestre as José
- Andrea Palma as Doña Eva
- Carlos López Moctezuma as Don Gregorio
- Andrés Soler as Don Pedro
- Julio Villarreal as Don Antonio
- Consuelo Guerrero de Luna as Doña Valentina
- Rosenda Monteros as Marta, Rita's sister (as Rosa Mendez)
- Antonio Bravo as Don Rubén
- Estela Matute as Jewelry employee
- Aurora Cortés as Maid
- Humberto Rodríguez as Notary
- Francisco Pando as Canteen owner
- Rodolfo Acosta as Agustín
- Magdaleno Barba as Man in Canteen (uncredited)
- Chel López as Gregorio's friend (uncredited)
- Pepe Martínez as Majordomo (uncredited)
- Inés Murillo as Village woman (uncredited)
- José Pardavé as Drunk in Canteen (uncredited)

== Production notes ==
As a superstar, the Cuban rumbera Ninón Sevilla asked to Producciones Calderón to call again Gabriel Figueroa as her photograph and Julio Bracho, one of the most prestigious filmmakers in Mexico, to direct her. The result was good: Take Me in Your Arms is a film that has grown over time as Adventuress, Victims of Sin and Sensuality. The film, which was shot with the binomial Ninón-Bracho, is a melodrama of bitter family feuds and vendettas, by a filmmaker on the crest of the wave, in the height of his success. There is everything: landowners, fishermen, sinister union leaders, impossible love; a young lady deceived and sexually abused. The whole conflict was dominated by great personalities: Carlos Lopez Moctezuma, Andrea Palma, Rodolfo Acosta, Andrés Soler and Ninon Sevilla as an ingenuous young girl dragged by a whirlwind of calamities.
