= List of Second French intervention in Mexico films =

Below is an incomplete list of feature films, television films or television series which include events of the Second French intervention in Mexico. This list does not include documentaries, short films.

== 1930s ==
Year	Country	Main title (Alternative title)	Original title (Original script)	Director	Subject
1934	Mexico	Juarez and Maximilian	Juárez y Maximiliano	Miguel Contreras Torres; Raphael J. Sevilla	Drama. Based on the play Juarez and Maximilian. Maximilian I of Mexico, Benito Juárez
1937	Mexico	Dove	La paloma	Miguel Contreras Torres	Biography, Drama, History, War.
1938	Mexico		Guadalupe La Chinaca	Raphael J. Sevilla	Drama, History, Romance.
1939	Mexico; United States	The Mad Empress		Miguel Contreras Torres	Biography, Drama, Romance, War. Maximilian I of Mexico, Charlotte of Belgium.
1939	United States	Juarez		William Dieterle	Biography, Drama, History, Romance. Based on the biography The Phantom Crown and the play Juarez and Maximilian.

== 1940s ==
Year	Country	Main title (Alternative title)	Original title (Original script)	Director	Subject
1942	Mexico	Imperial Cavalry	Caballería del imperio	Miguel Contreras Torres	Drama, War.
1943	Mexico	Mexicans, to the Cry of War	Mexicanos, al grito de guerra	Álvaro Gálvez y Fuentes; Ismael Rodríguez	Biography, Drama, Romance, War.
1944	Mexico	The Escape	La fuga	Norman Foster	Adventure, Drama, War. Based on a short story Boule de Suif.
1944	Mexico	Highway of Cats	El camino de los gatos	Chano Urueta	Drama. Based on a novel The Cats' Bridge.
1944	Mexico	Porfirio Díaz		Raphael J. Sevilla; Rafael M. Saavedra	Adventure, Biography, Drama, War. Porfirio Díaz

== 1950s ==
Year	Country	Main title (Alternative title)	Original title (Original script)	Director	Subject
1950	Mexico		Sentencia	Emilio Gómez Muriel	Drama, War.
1950	United States	The Eagle and the Hawk		Lewis R. Foster	Western.
1951	Mexico; United States	Stronghold		Steve Sekely	Adventure, Drama, Romance, War.
1951	Mexico; United States	Red Fury	Furia roja	Steve Sekely; Víctor Urruchúa	Adventure, Drama, Romance, War.
1951	Mexico	The Christ of my Headboard	El Cristo de mi Cabecera	Ernesto Cortázar	Drama, War.
1954	United States; Mexico	Vera Cruz		Robert Aldrich	Adventure, Drama, Western.
1958	Mexico	The end of an empire	El fin de un imperio	Jaime Salvador	Adventure, Drama, Romance.

== 1960s ==
Year	Country	Main title (Alternative title)	Original title (Original script)	Director	Subject
1965	Spain; Italy	Heroes of Fort Worth		Alberto De Martino	Western.
1965	United States	Major Dundee		Sam Peckinpah	Adventure, Drama, War, Western.
1965	West Germany; Italy; France	The Treasure of the Aztecs	Der Schatz der Azteken	Robert Siodmak	Adventure, Western. Based on the works of Karl May.
1965	West Germany; France; Italy; Yugoslavia	The Pyramid of the Sun God	Die Pyramide des Sonnengottes	Robert Siodmak	Western, Adventure. Based on the works of Karl May.
1966	Italy; Spain	Mutiny at Fort Sharpe	Per un dollaro di gloria	Fernando Cerchio	Western.
1967	Mexico; United States	The Bandits	Los Bandidos	Robert Conrad; Alfredo Zacarías	Adventure, Drama, Western.
1969	United States	The Undefeated		Andrew V. McLaglen	Action, Adventure, Drama, Romance, War, Western. Joseph O. Shelby

== 1970s ==
Year	Country	Main title (Alternative title)	Original title (Original script)	Director	Subject
1970	Italy; Spain	Adiós, Sabata	Indio Black, sai che ti dico: Sei un gran figlio di...	Gianfranco Parolini	Action, Drama, War, Western.
1970	Mexico; United States	Two Mules for Sister Sara		Don Siegel	Adventure, Drama, Romance, War, Western.
1970	United States	El Condor		John Guillermin	Action, Adventure, Drama, Romance, Western.
1972	Italy; West Germany; France	Return of Halleluja	Il West ti va stretto, amico... è arrivato Alleluja	Giuliano Carnimeo	Western, Comedy.
1973	Mexico	Those Years	Aquellos años	Felipe Cazals; Mario Llorca	Drama, History, War. Benito Juárez
1974	Mexico	The Lord of Osanto	El señor de Osanto	Jaime Humberto Hermosillo	Drama, History, War.
1977	Mexico	Mariachi - Blood Festival	Mariachi - Fiesta de sangre	Rafael Portillo	Musical, Drama.

== 1990s ==
Year	Country	Main title (Alternative title)	Original title (Original script)	Director	Subject
1990	United States	Savate		Isaac Florentine	Action, Western.

== 2010s ==
Year	Country	Main title (Alternative title)	Original title (Original script)	Director	Subject
2013	Mexico	Cinco De Mayo: The Battle	Cinco de mayo: La batalla	Rafa Lara	Drama, History, War. Battle of Puebla

== 2020s ==
Year	Country	Main title (Alternative title)	Original title (Original script)	Director	Subject
2021	France; Colombia	Towards the Battle	Vers la bataille	Aurélien Vernhes-Lermusiaux	Adventure, Drama.

== Television films ==
Year	Country	Main title (Alternative title)	Original title (Original script)	Director	Subject
1994	United States; Mexico	The Cisco Kid		Luis Valdez	Comedy, Western. The Cisco Kid

== Television series ==
Year	Country	Main title (Alternative title)	Original title (Original script)	Director	Subject
1970	West Germany; Austria	Maximilian of Mexico	Maximilian von Mexiko	Günter Gräwert	Drama. Maximilian I of Mexico
1972	Mexico	The carriage	El carruaje	Ernesto Alonso	Biography, Drama, History, Romance, War.
1988	East Germany	Prairie hunters in Mexico	Präriejäger in Mexiko	Hans Knötzsch	Based on the novels Waldröschen.
