= Ninón Sevilla =

Cuban-Mexican actress and dancer

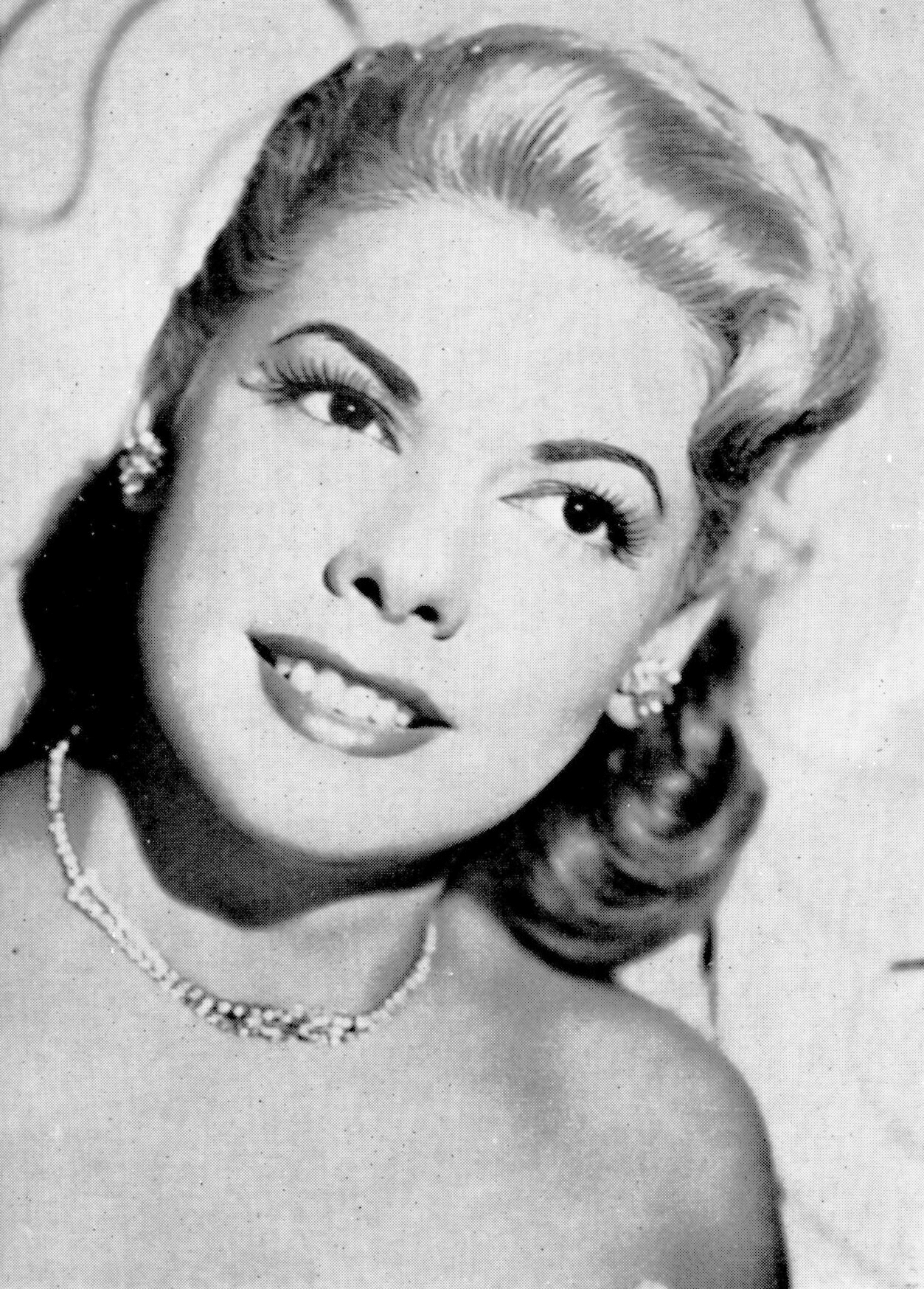
- Sevilla in 1954
- Born: Emelia Pérez Castellanos; 10 November 1929; Havana, Cuba
- Died: 1 January 2015 (aged 85); Mexico City, Mexico
- Occupations: Actress, dancer and singer
- Years active: 1946–2014
- Spouse: José Gil
- Partner: Pedro Arturo Calderón

Emelia Pérez Castellanos (10 November 1929 – 1 January 2015), known professionally as Ninón Sevilla, was a Cuban-Mexican actress and dancer.

== Early life ==
Sevilla was born and raised in Centro Habana, a popular section of Havana. As a youth, she thought about becoming a missionary nun, but after she started dancing with success in nightclubs and cabarets, she opted for a career in show business. She adopted her stage name in tribute to the legendary French courtesan Ninon de l'Enclos and began to work in the chorus of the Cuban comedians Mimí Cal and Leopoldo Fernández, respectively known as "Nananina" and "Tres Patines".

== Career ==
Sevilla came to Mexico as part of a show starring the Argentinean singer Libertad Lamarque. Her number in the show was so successful that she was soon booked in other spectacles in Mexico City. While performing in the Teatro Lírico, producer Pedro Arturo Calderón saw Sevilla on stage and offered her a film contract. Her debut in cinema was in 1946 in Carita de Cielo with María Elena Marqués and Antonio Badú. From that moment, Sevilla became the exclusive star of Producciones Calderón, and although she had offers from Metro-Goldwyn-Mayer and Columbia Pictures, she turned them down because she was not interested in working in Hollywood.

Although from the beginning Sevilla was marked by the eccentricity of her hairdos and gowns, it was director Alberto Gout who established her as one of the ultimate erotic figures of Mexican cinema, leading her in legendary films as Aventurera (1949), and Sensualidad (1950). Besides being directed by Gout also in Mujeres sacrificadas (1952) and Aventura en Río (1953), she also worked with Emilio Fernández "El Indio," who directed her in one of the best films of her career, the classic Víctimas del Pecado (1951); Julio Bracho in Take Me in Your Arms (1954); Gilberto Martinez Solares in Mulata (1954) and the comedy Club de Señoritas (1956); and Alfredo B. Crevenna in Yambaó (1956).

In the musical Rumberas film, Ninón Sevilla internationalized the icon of the rumbera: she was an archetype in several films, in which a "fallen woman" was dignified through dance. She staged the choreographies of her films, and was the first performer to introduce plots from Santeria rituals in her movies. She had large forums, sets, costumes, first-rate technicians and alternated with figures of Latin American cinema such as Joaquín Pardavé, Andrea Palma, Fernando Soler, Pedro Armendáriz, Anita Blanch, Agustín Lara, Domingo Soler, David Silva, Rita Montaner, Ramón Gay, Tito Junco, Andrés Soler, Roberto Cañedo, Fanny Kauffman, René Cardona, Pedro Vargas, Toña la Negra, the trio Los Panchos, as well as Mendive and Perez Prado.

By 1950, Ninón Sevilla had consolidated her sex symbol status and was a superstar. Her success led to her being recognized in countries like Brazil and France. In 1955, the future French director François Truffaut made a review of Llévame en tus brazos, in which he wrote: "Is Ninón dancing for glory? No way, never. It is quite clear Ninón is dancing for pleasure!"

With the decline of the Golden Age of Mexican cinema, Ninón Sevilla retired from the industry, but returned in 1981 by the hand of Mario Hernández, who directed her in the 1981 film Noche de Carnaval, for which she received the Silver Ariel Award for Best Actress of the Year.

Ninón Sevilla debuted on television in 1965 with a small role in the soap opera Juicio de almas, produced by Ernesto Alonso. After the revival of her career, she was invited in 1987 to appear in the telenovela Rosa salvaje, alongside Verónica Castro. She was cast in numerous supporting roles in several telenovelas, as María la del Barrio (1995), Rosalinda (1999) and Qué bonito amor (2012), among others.

In 2014, Ninon Sevilla was the subject of tributes from the Mexican Academy of Film Arts and Sciences and the Cineteca of Mexico for her career and influence in their national cinema.

== Personal life ==
Ninon Sevilla had a long relationship with film producer Pedro Arturo Calderón. Eventually, she married Cuban doctor José Gil. When Gil died, she started another relationship and had her only son, the musician Genaro Lozano. Ninon died on 1 January 2015 at the age of 85.

== Filmography ==
- Carita de Cielo (1946)
- Pecadora (1947)
- Jalisco Fair (1948)
- Señora Tentación (1948)
- Revancha (1949)
- Coqueta (1949)
- Perdida (1950)
- Aventurera (1950)
- Victimas del Pecado (1951)
- Sensuality (1951)
- I Don't Deny My Past (1952)
- Sacrificed Women (1952)
- Aventura en Río (1953)
- Take Me in Your Arms (1953)
- Mulata (1954)
- Amor y pecado (1955)
- Club de señoritas (1955)
- Yambaó (1957)
- Mujeres de fuego (1959)
- Zarzuela 1900 (1959)
- Noche de carnaval (1981)
- Las noches del Blanquita (1981)
- Viva el chubasco (1984)
- El cabaretero y sus golfas (1985)
- Hoy como ayer (1987)
- Jóvenes delincuentes (1988)
- Rumbera caliente (1989)

=== TV ===
- Juicio de almas (1964)
- Tú eres mi destino (1984)... Licha del Rey
- Rosa salvaje (1987)... Zoraida
- Cuando llega el amor (1989)... Nina
- Yo no creo en los hombres (1991)... Emelia
- Las secretas intenciones (1992)... Julieta
- María la del barrio (1995)... Caridad
- La usurpadora (1998)... Cachita Cienfuegos
- Rosalinda (1999)... Asuncion
- Tres mujeres (1999)... Yolanda
- El precio de tu amor (2000)... Dalila
- Entre el amor y el odio (2002)... Macarena
- Amarte es mi pecado (2004)... Donia Galia de Caridad
- Central de abasto (2008)... La Jarocha
- Como dice el dicho (2012)... Pola
- Qué bonito amor (2012)... Donia Remedios

== Bibliography ==
- Muñoz Castillo, Fernando (1993). Las Reinas del Tropico: María Antonieta Pons, Meche Barba, Amalia Aguilar, Ninón Sevilla & Rosa Carmina. Grupo Azabache. ISBN 968-6084-85-1.
- Las Rumberas del Cine Mexicano (The Rumberas of the Mexican Cinema) (1999). In SOMOS. México: Editorial Televisa, S. A. de C. V.
- Agrasánchez Jr., Rogelio (2001). Bellezas del cine mexicano/Beauties of Mexican Cinema. Archivo Fílmico Agrasánchez. ISBN 968-5077-11-8.
