= Medea de Novara =

Liechtenstein-born Mexican actress (1905–2001)

- Born: Hermine Kindle; 18 April 1905; Triesen, Liechtenstein
- Died: 21 September 2001 (aged 96); Triesen, Liechtenstein
- Occupation: Actress
- Spouse(s): Miguel Contreras Torres (m. 1936; died 1981) Boris Reynolds García (m. 1983)
- Relatives: Florian Kindle (brother)

Medea de Novara (née Hermine Kindle; 18 April 1905 – 1 November 2001) was a Liechtensteiner-born actress who appeared in Mexican films. She was noted for her resemblance to the Empress Carlota of Mexico, who she played four times on screen, and was married to the Mexican film director Miguel Contreras Torres.

== Biography ==
Hermine Kindle was born on 18 April 1905, in Triesen, Liechtenstein as the daughter of Florian Kindle and Amalie (née Futscher) as one of nine children. Her brother Florian Kindle served in the Landtag of Liechtenstein.

In 1925, Kindle emigrated to Hollywood. There she met the Mexican director, screenwriter, film producer, and actor Miguel Contreras Torres, whom she married in 1936 and then subsequently moved to Mexico. During this time, she adopted the stage name Medea de Novara.

Novara gained recognition for her role as Empress Carlota of Mexico in the Emperor Maximilian trilogy: Juárez y Maximiliano (1933), La paloma (1937), and The Mad Empress (1939). Her greatest success came with the film María Magdalena: Pecadora de Magdala (1946), for which she co-wrote the screenplay and played the title role of María Magdalena.

In 1951, she and her husband bought Gutenberg Castle in Balzers, Liechtenstein, supposedly to realize one her childhood dreams. Afterwards, Novara visited Liechtenstein every summer. In 1979, the Liechtenstein government bought the castle and the surrounding land but she retained lifetime residency rights. She subsequently returned to her home municipality of Triesen.

Novara married Boris Reynolds García, her former secretary, on 31 October 1983. Novara died on 21 September 2001 in Triesen, aged 96. On 31 October 2018, an altar was erected in honour of Novara and Torres at the University of Liechtenstein.

== Selected filmography ==
- Reina de reinas: La Virgen María (1948)
- María Magdalena: Pecadora de Magdala (1946)
- Caballería del imperio (1942)
- Hombre o demonio (1940)
- The Mad Empress (1939)
- La golondrina (1938)
- La paloma (1937)
- Juarez and Maximilian (1934)
- Tribu (1934)
- La noche del pecado (1933)
- Soñadores de gloria (1932)

== Bibliography ==
- Dick, Bernard F., Hal Wallis: Producer to the Stars. University Press of Kentucky, 2015.
- Hollenstein, Andreas (2020). "Kindheitserinnerungen an unsere Tante Hermine". Balzner Neujahrsblätter 2020 [Balzers New Year’s Papers] (in German). Balzers: Balzner Neujahrsblätter.
