= Angels of the Street =

Angels of the Street may refer to:

- Angels of the Street (1969 film), a West German crime film
- Angels of the Street (1953 film), a Cuban-Mexican drama film
