= Another Dawn (1943 film) =

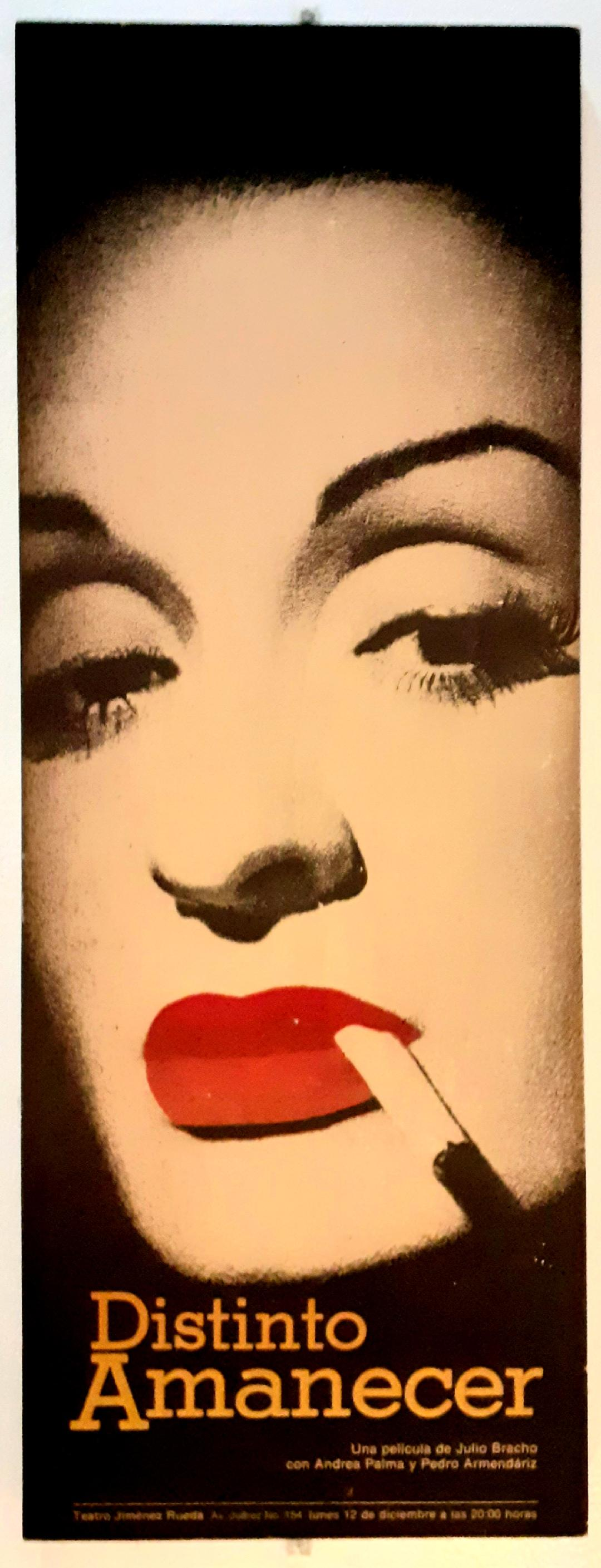
- Film poster
- Directed by: Julio Bracho
- Written by: Max Aub (play); Xavier Villaurrutia; Julio Bracho
- Produced by: Emilio Gómez Muriel
- Starring: Andrea Palma; Pedro Armendáriz; Alberto Galán
- Cinematography: Gabriel Figueroa
- Edited by: Gloria Schoemann
- Music by: Raúl Lavista
- Production company: Films Mundiales
- Distributed by: Films Mundiales
- Release date: 18 November 1943
- Running time: 108 minutes
- Country: Mexico
- Language: Spanish

Another Dawn (Spanish: Distinto amanecer) is a 1943 Mexican thriller film directed and co-written by Julio Bracho and starring Andrea Palma, Pedro Armendáriz and Alberto Galán. The film's sets were designed by the art director Jorge Fernandez.

== Plot ==
A politician, Octavio, has discovered damaging information about the regional Governor who has recently crushed a strike at the urging of "foreign interests". Octavio is hunted by the Governor's bodyguards who wish to kill him and recover the documents he has stolen. While hiding in a cinema, Octavio bumps into Julieta who takes him home to hide. Julieta and her husband Ignacio are old friends of Octavio as they had been student activists together. Despite agreeing to help, Ignacio is resentful of Octavio because of the past relationship he had with Julieta. Octavio discovers that it is an unhappy marriage, Ignacio has a mistress while Julieta is forced to work as a taxi dancer in a cabaret to make ends meet.

Julieta shoots dead a government spy who has discovered Octavio's location. She helps Octavio reach a train which will enable him to go to Mexico City and present evidence exposing the Governor. Julieta plans to elope with him, but at the last moment turns back to stay with Ignacio.

== Cast ==
- Andrea Palma as Julieta
- Pedro Armendáriz as Octavio
- Alberto Galán as Ignacio Elizalde
- Narciso Busquets as Juanito
- Maruja Grifell as Ruiz's wife
- Manuel Arvide as Gunman
- Lucila Bowling as Gloria
- Manuel Dondé as Gunman
- Gaspar Henaine as Train assistant

== Bibliography ==
- Mora, Carl J. Mexican Cinema: Reflections of a Society. University of California Press, 1989.
