= Olga Guillot =

Cuban singer (1922–2010)

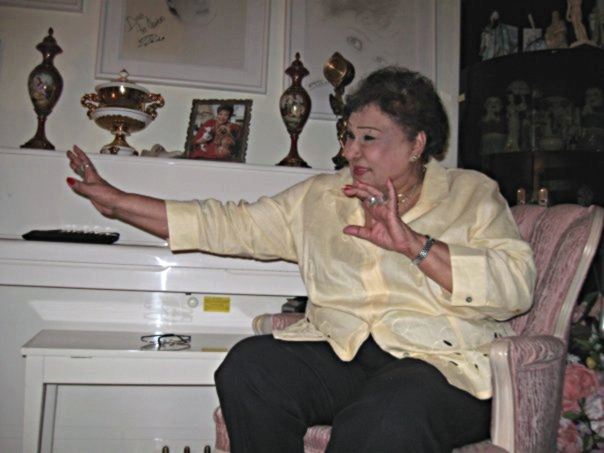

Background information
- Also known as: La Reina del Bolero
- Born: October 9, 1922; Santiago de Cuba, Cuba
- Died: July 12, 2010 (aged 87) Miami Beach, Florida, US
- Genres: Bolero
- Occupation: Singer
- Years active: 1945–2010
- Labels: Puchito, Zafiro

Olga Guillot (October 9, 1922 – July 12, 2010) was a Cuban singer who was known as the "Queen of Bolero". She was a native of Santiago de Cuba.

== Biography ==
Daughter of immigrants who moved to Cuba, her father was a tailor and her mother was a seamstress. Olga Guillot was born in Santiago de Cuba, and her family moved to Havana when she was five years old. As a teenager, she and her sister, Ana Luisa, performed as the "Duo Hermanitas Guillot." It wasn't until 1945 that her talent as a bolero singer was discovered, when Facundo Rivero, an influential man in the Cuban music scene of the era, heard her sing for the first time and helped her make her professional singing debut at a famous Havana night club. Soon after, Guillot met Miguelito Valdés, who took her to New York City, where Guillot was able to record her first album with the Decca label.

She gained recognition in the United States with her version in Spanish of "Stormy Weather" in 1946.

Guillot traveled to Mexico in 1948. There, she established herself as an international singer and actress, appearing in various films and making her second album. In Mexico, Guillot began to enjoy much popularity for the first time in her career.

In 1954, she recorded her song "Miénteme" ("Lie to Me") by the Mexican composer Chamaco Domínguez, and which became a huge hit across Latin America and earned her three consecutive awards back home in Cuba as Cuba's best female singer.

1958 proved to be an important year for Guillot, as she toured Europe for the first time, performing in Italy, France, Spain and Germany. She sang alongside the legendary Édith Piaf at a concert held in Cannes.

Olga Guillot kept a house in Cuba as she traveled around the world, along with her house in Mexico. But Guillot opposed Fidel Castro's regime, and in 1962 she decided to leave Cuba for good and establish herself in Venezuela. Not long after that, she left Venezuela, making Mexico her only permanent country of residence.

Meanwhile, she kept touring around the world, singing in places such as Israel, Japan and Hong Kong. In 1963, Guillot was given the Golden Palm Award as "best bolero singer of Latin America." She received the award in Hollywood, California. Guillot sang in 1964 at New York's famed Carnegie Hall, becoming the first Latin artist to sing there. During her career, she performed alongside superstars of music such as Frank Sinatra, Sarah Vaughan, and her close friend and fellow Cuban exile, the great Celia Cruz.

Guillot continued touring for the next forty years, releasing over fifty albums and winning numerous awards for her achievements in the music world. She was very good friends with Celia Cruz, whom she often referred to as "(her) sister". When Cruz died from cancer, Guillot was very bereaved over the loss of her close friend and compatriot. She was the godmother of singer José José. Guillot lived mainly in Mexico and had another home on Miami Beach, Florida.

== Death ==
On July 12, 2010, Guillot died of a heart attack at the age of 87 in Miami Beach, Florida. She is survived by one daughter, Olga Maria Touzet-Guillot, born from her relationship with pianist and composer René Touzet.

== Discography ==
Please note that the dating information was obtained mostly from The Cristóbal Díaz Ayala collection at FIU and from the original recordings when available. The discography is not complete as there are other recordings and reissues outstanding. Updated September 2, 2017.

With Panart Records

- 3105 Sus Primeros Éxitos (1946)
- LP3105 Olga Guillot Sus Primeros Éxitos (1962) Reissue

With Puchito Records

- LPP-101 Olga Guillot La Mejor Voz Cancionera de Cuba (1954)
- LPP-102 Olga Guillot La Mejor Voz Cancionera De Cuba (Vol. 2) (1955)
- LPP-104 Olga Guillot La Mejor Voz Cancionera De Cuba (Vol. 3) (1956) with La Orquesta Hermanos Castro and Miguelito Valdes
- LPP-509 Olga Guillot (1954)
- MLP-515 Romance y Melodia (1957)
- MLP-525 Olga Guillot (1958)
- MLP-526 Intimidades con Olga Guillot (1958)
- MLP-530 Creaciones de la Guillot (1959)
- MLP-538 Olga en Mexico (1959)
- MLP-555 Olga de Cuba (1960)
- MLP-559 Comunicando (1960)
- MLP-564 Lo mejor de Olga Guillot (1963)
- MLP-580 La Insuperable Olga (1964) with Miguelito Valdes and El Cuarteto Los Ruffinos

With Musart Records

- D-342 Intimidades con Olga Guillot (1958)
- DM-292 Olga Guillot (1959)
- 402 Con Amor (1959)
- D-435 Olga en Mexico (1959)
- D-528 Canciones a la Guillot
- D-574 Olga en Cuba (1960)
- DM-672 Olga (1961)
- DM-751 Olga Guillot y Las Canciones de Maria Grever (1962)
- D-855 La Temperamental (1963)
- DM-935 Añorando el Caribe (1964)
- DM-959 12 Exitos Romanticos Voy (1964)
- DC-1011 Los Éxitos de Olga Guillot
- DM-1060 Mas Exitos Romanticos de Olga Guillot (1965)
- DM-1180 Y Siguen los Éxitos de Olga Guillot (1966)
- DM-1256 Gracias America
- DM-12561 Bravo (1967)
- D-1280 Olga Guillot No, Celoso (1967)
- DM-1312 Olga Le Canta a America (1967)
- DM-1360 Olga Guillot interpreta a Manzanero (1967)
- DM- 1384 Olga Guillot Interpreta sus Futuros Éxitos
- EDM-1423 Olga Guillot Vol. 14 (1969)
- 1472 Olga Guillot Vol. 15 (1970)
- EDM-1472 La Mujer Que Te ama (1970)
- DM-14501 Olga Guillot Vol. 17
- DM-14507 Quien Da Mas (1971)
- 1536 Olga Guillot Recuerdame (1971)
- DM-1576 Y ahora....Olga (1972)

With Oasis/Musart Records

- OA 323 Olga Guillot
- OA-383 15 Éxitos de Olga Guillot (1984)

With Aro Records

- LP123 Vol. I Olga Guillot Sus Grandes Éxitos

With Trébol/Musart

- T10210 Olga Guillot (1971)
- T10301 Olga Guillot
- TAT 10657 La Temperamental Olga Guillot 3 LP's

With Codiscos/Trebol

- ELDD-50208 Epoca de Oro Olga Guillot (Colombia)

With Dardo Records

- JDP 3645 Olga Guillot
- JDP 3645 Comunicando con Olga Guillot
- JDP 3648 Creaciones de La Guillot

With Disco Records

- D2001 Olga Guillot y El Trío Los Murcianos (1971)

Montilla Records

- MLP 509 Olga Guillot Orquesta Hermanos Castro (1954)

With CBS/Caytronics Records

- CYS1479 Se me olvidó otra vez (1976)
- 19.652 Soy Lo Prohibido (1976)
- S81646 Se me Olvidó Otra Vez (1976)

With Music Hall/ Musart Records

- 771 Bravo
- 775 Olga Guillot
- 12.578 Vámonos de Fiesta
- 12.733 Soñando Boleros
- 12.747 La Guillot Interpreta Manzanero
- 12.765 12 Éxitos Románticos
- 12.773 Mas Romántico
- 12.807 El Temperamento de la Guillot
- 12.852 Olga de América (1971)
- 12.876 Única Olga Guillot

With Odeon Records

- LDS 2092 Olga Guillot y Las Canciones de Maria Grever

With Orfeon Records

- JP-2244 Olga Guillot En Concierto (1977)
- LP-1650-5081 Olga Guillot (1977)
- LP-LP-16H5082 Olga Guillot (1977)
- 13.2035/9 Olga Guillot (1980)
- EPC88544 Recuerdos de Oro Olga Guillot 2LP

With Gaviota/Cisne Records

- CI-1297 Olga Guillot Total
- CI-1301 Contigo a la Distancia
- CGV-8110 Lo Mejor de Olga Guillot (1982)

With Astral Records

- CGS3710 Para Mi Publico Cuenta Conmigo Olga Guillot (1982)

With AF Records

- Serie T.V.8001 Los 15 Grandes de Olga Guillot

With Rex/Musart Records

- R233 Sigue La Temperamental

With Ricky Records

- LP 101 Olga Guillot Recordando El Pasado

With Tropical records

- TRLP 5167 Voy y Copa de Vino

With Interdisc Records

- 3054 Olga Guillot Cuenta Conmigo

With Zafiro/Musart Records

- ML-2 Éxitos Inolvidables de Olga Guillot (1967)
- ML-11 Olga Le Canta A America (1967)
- ZV-848 Olga Guillot (1975)

With DM Records

- 90.931/6 Olga Guillot Vámonos de Fiesta (1966)

With Adria/Antilla Records (Reissues)

- AP-1 Época de Oro Olga Guillot Vol. 1
- AP-2 Canciones Que Siempre Quise Grabar
- AP-3 Olga Guillot Campanitas de Cristal
- AP-3 (Antilla) Olga Guillot Campanitas de Cristal
- AP-4 Blanca Navidad Olga Guillot
- AP-4 Machito y Pavo Olga Guillot Blanca Navidad
- AP-28 Olga Guillot No me Quieras Asi
- AP- 29 Época de Oro Olga Guillot Vol. II
- AP- 29 (Antilla) Época de Oro Olga Guillot
- AP- 30 Enamorada Olga Guillot
- Ap- 32 Olga Guillot en La Intimidad

With UA Latino

- LT-LA114-E-2 Olga Guillot 2 LP's (1973)

With Warner Records

- 87844-2 Faltaba yo CD (2001)

== Filmography ==
- Venus de Fuego (Mexico, 1949)
- No Me Olvides Nunca (Mexico/Cuba, 1956)
- Yambaó – Cry of the Bewitched (Mexico/Cuba, 1957)
- Matar Es Facil (Mexico, 1965)
