= Isabela Corona =

Mexican actress (1913–1993)

- Born: Refugio Pérez Frías; July 2, 1913; Autlán de Navarro
- Died: July 8, 1993 (aged 80); Mexico City
- Occupations: Actress (theater, film, TV)
- Years active: 1930s – 1990s

Isabela Corona (July 2, 1913 – July 8, 1993) was a Mexican actress. She debuted during the first decade of the Golden Age of Mexican cinema.

== Biography ==
Isabela Corona was born as Refugio Pérez Frías in El Chante, a municipio of Autlán, Jalisco. In her early years she moved to Mexico City, where she started her career on stage of the teatro Ideal as a teenager in 1926. Afterwards she participated in the Teatro Ulises and the Teatro Orientación movement of the Los Contemporáneos group, and made afterwards a career in the theater, movie and television businesses. She became better known in the end of the 1930s, when she played in La noche de los mayas.

She was considered, along with Esther Fernández, Andrea Palma and Lupe Vélez, a great Mexican cinema diva of the 1930s. Corona died six days after her 80th birthday from a heart attack.

== Filmography ==
=== Movies ===
- "Mexicano ¡Tú puedes!", 1985
- "Cóndores no entierran todos los días" as Dona Gertrudis Potes, 1984 (English title: "A Man of Principle")
- "El guerrillero del norte", 1983 (English title: "Guerilla from the North")
- "La casa de Bernarda Alba", 1982 (English: House of Bernarda Alba" or Bernarda Alba's House")
- "Los gemelos alborotados", 1982
- "El infierno de todos tan temido" as Calandria, 1981
- "El mil usos", 1981 (English title: "A Thousand Uses")
- "Adriana del Rio, actriz", 1979 (English title: Adriana del Rio, Actress")
- "Los indolentes" as Amarinda Alday, 1979
- "El secuestro de los cien millones", 1979
- "La Tía Alejandra" as Tía Alejandra, 1979 (English title: "Tia Alejandra")
- "La Casa del Pelícano" as Clementina, 1978 (English title: "Pelican's House")
- "Damiana" as The Mad Woman, 1978
- "La tigresa", 1973 (English title: "The Tigress")
- "Yesenia", 1971
- "No hay cruces en el mar", 1968
- "El bastardo", 1968
- "Crisol", 1967
- "Cruces sobre el yermo", 1967
- "El hombre propone...", 1965
- "El espejo de la bruja" as Sara, 1962 (USA: "The Witch's Mirror"; dubbed version)
- "Pecado mortal", 1955 (English title: "Mortal Sin")
- "La gitana blanca", 1954
- "Los que no deben nacer", 1953
- "Marejada", 1952
- "Trotacalles" as Luz, 1951
- "La posesión" as spouse of Luz, 1950
- "El rencor de la tierra", 1949 (English title: "Rancor of the Soil")
- "Lola Casanova", 1949
- "El precio de la gloria" as Doña Lupe Reyes, 1949 (English title: "Price of Glory")
- "¡Ya tengo a mi hijo!", 1948
- "La culpable", 1946
- "La casa de la zorra", 1945 (USA: "The House of the Fox")
- "La mujer legítima" as Marta, 1945
- "Entre hermanos", 1945 (English title: "Between Brothers")
- "El secreto de la solterona", 1945
- "Murallas de pasión", 1944 (English title: "Walls of Passion")
- "Caminito alegre" as Madre superiora, 1944
- "Ave sin nido", 1943 (Mexico: "Anita de Montemar")
- "El ángel negro", 1942
- "La isla de la pasión" as Lolita, 1942 (a.k.a. "Clipperton" or "Passion Island")
- "La casa del rencor", 1941
- "Creo en Dios", 1941 (USA: "Believe in God"; Mexico: "Labios sellados")
- "Los de abajo", 1940 (Mexico: "Con la división del norte")
- "La noche de los mayas", 1939 (USA: "Night of the Mayas") as Zeb

=== TV series ===
- "Lo blanco y lo negro" ("Black and White") as Citlalli, 1992
- "Yo compro esa mujer" as Soledad, 1990
- "Victoria", 1987
- "Los años pasan" ("Years Passed") as Apolonia, 1985
- "Bianca Vidal" as Nana Maria, 1985
- "La fiera", 1983 Dona Heloisa
- "Vanessa" as Grandmother Cècile de Saint-Germain, 1982
- "Caminemos", 1980
- "Una mujer marcada" as Sofia, 1979
- "Donde termina el camino" ("Where the Road Ends"), 1978
- "Viviana" as Consuelo, 1978 (unknown episodes)
- "Pobre Clara" as Nieves, 1975
- "Muchacha italiana viene a casarse" as Mercedes de Castro, 1971
- "Risas amargas", 1961
