= Fortunio Bonanova =

Spanish actor and opera singer (1895–1969)

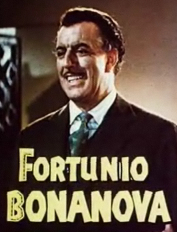
- From the film Fiesta (1947)
- Born: Josep Lluís Moll; 13 January 1895; Palma, Mallorca, Balearic Islands, Spain
- Died: 2 April 1969 (aged 74); Woodland Hills, Los Angeles, California, U.S.
- Occupations: Actor, opera singer
- Years active: 1922–1964

Fortunio Bonanova, pseudonym of Josep Lluís Moll, (13 January 1895 – 2 April 1969) was a Spanish baritone singer and a film, theater, and television actor. He occasionally worked as a producer and director.

According to Lluis Fàbregas Cuixart, (Note: Luis Fábregas y Cuxart (Palma 1906–1979) was a fairly well-known Mallorcan author) the pseudonym Fortunio Bonanova referred to his desire to seek fortune, and his love of the Bonanova neighborhood in his native Palma.

== Biography ==
As a young man, living under his birthname, he was a professional telegraph operator. He studied music with the Italian Giovachini. In 1921, he debuted as a singer in Tannhäuser, at the Teatre Principal in Palma. That year, along with a group of Mallorcan intellectuals and Jorge Luis Borges (who was briefly living in Mallorca with his parents and sister), he signed the Ultraist Manifesto, using the name Fortunio Bonanova.

Also in 1921, he appeared in a silent film of Don Juan Tenorio by the brothers Baños, which was shown the following year in New York City and Hollywood. He later directed his own Don Juan in 1924.

In 1927, he acted in Love of Sunya, directed by Albert Parker and starring Gloria Swanson. In 1932 he had small parts in Hollywood productions featuring Joan Bennett and Mary Astor. In the same period, he appeared in New York in several operas as well as the zarzuelas La Canción del Olvido ("The song of forgetting"), La Duquesa del Tabarín ("The Duchess of Tabarín"), Los Gavilanes, and La Montería. In 1934, he returned to Spain, where he had a major role in the film El Desaparecido ("The disappeared one") written and directed by Antonio Graciani. In 1935 he acted and sang in the film Poderoso Caballero ("A Big Guy"), directed by Màximo Nossik.

In 1936, with the outbreak of the Spanish Civil War, he returned to the United States, where he played the role of Captain Bill in a film called Capitán Tormenta, directed by Jules Bernhardt. A sequence of increasingly larger acting and singing roles mostly in English-language films followed, especially after 1940. Among his roles were Signor Matiste, Susan Alexander Kane's opera coach in Citizen Kane (1941); General Sebastiano in Five Graves to Cairo (1943); Don Miguel in The Black Swan (1942); Fernando in For Whom the Bell Tolls (1943); Sam Garlopis in Double Indemnity (1944); and a singing Christopher Columbus in Where Do We Go From Here?. He continued for the next several decades in a miscellany of character roles.

Bonanova was also an uncredited technical consultant for the film Blood and Sand (1941), and produced and appeared in the Spanish-language film La Inmaculada (a name of the Virgin Mary, "Immaculate")(1939).

Bonanova played the father of twins Esther Williams, and Ricardo Montalbán in the 1947 film Fiesta. In 1949, Bonanova collaborated with Ambrose Barker on a musical entitled "Glamor/Glamour is the Gimmick." It got bad reviews—what may have been popular and witty when Barker developed it in the early 1930s didn’t make it in 1949.

In the 1950s, he appeared in an episode of I Love Lucy as a fake psychic who uses his stage apparatus to make it appear as though Lucy is able to speak Spanish to her mother-in-law. In 1952, he played an Italian opera singer, Anthony Branchetti, in the fourth episode of My Little Margie where Margie helps her father by convincing Mr. Branchetti to appear at a party in his honor to impress a reluctant client of Honeywell & Todd. In 1953 he played Lou Costello's Uncle Bozzo in the Abbott & Costello episode of "Uncle Bozzo's Visit." In 1955, he portrayed an opera star in an episode of the situation comedy Willy.

Bonanova died in 1969 in Woodland Hills, California of a cerebral hemorrhage and is buried at Holy Cross Cemetery in Culver City, California.

== Partial filmography ==
- Don Juan Tenorio (1922) - Don Juan Tenorio
- Don Juan (1924)
- Careless Lady (1932) - Rodriguez (film debut)
- A Successful Calamity (1932) - Pietro Rafaelo, the Pianist
- He Who Disappeared (1934) - Reporter
- El capitan Tormenta (1936) - Capt. Bill
- Poderoso caballero (1936)
- El carnaval del diablo (1936)
- Beg, Borrow or Steal (1937) - ISMAN (uncredited)
- Romance in the Dark (1938) - Tenor
- Tropic Holiday (1938) - Barrera
- Bulldog Drummond in Africa (1938) - African Police Corporal (uncredited)
- La Inmaculada (1939)
- I Was an Adventuress (1940) - Orchestra Leader
- Down Argentine Way (1940) - Hotel Manager
- The Mark of Zorro (1940) - Sentry (uncredited)
- That Night in Rio (1941) - Pereira
- They Met in Argentina (1941) - Pedro, Ranch Blacksmith (uncredited)
- Citizen Kane (1941) - Signor Matiste
- Blood and Sand (1941) - Pedro Espinosa
- Moon Over Miami (1941) - Mr. Pretto
- Unfinished Business (1941) - Impresario (uncredited)
- A Yank in the R.A.F. (1941) - Louie - Headwaiter
- Two Latins from Manhattan (1941) - Armando Rivero
- Mr. and Mrs. North (1942) - Buano
- Four Jacks and a Jill (1942) - Mike - Nightclub Owner (uncredited)
- Call Out the Marines (1942) - Chef (uncredited)
- Obliging Young Lady (1942) - Chef
- Sing Your Worries Away (1942) - Gaston - Headwaiter (uncredited)
- Larceny, Inc. (1942) - Anton Copoulos
- Girl Trouble (1942) - Simon Cordoba
- The Black Swan (1942) - Don Miguel (uncredited)
- Hello, Frisco, Hello (1943) - Opera Singer (uncredited)
- Five Graves to Cairo (1943) - Gen. Sebastiano
- Dixie (1943) - Waiter
- For Whom the Bell Tolls (1943) - Fernando
- The Sultan's Daughter (1943) - Kuda
- The Song of Bernadette (1943) - Imperial Prince Louis (uncredited)
- Ali Baba and the Forty Thieves (1944) - Old Baba
- My Best Gal (1944) - Charlie
- Going My Way (1944) - Tomaso Bozanni
- Double Indemnity (1944) - Sam Garlopis
- Mrs. Parkington (1944) - Signor Cellini
- Brazil (1944) - Senor Renaldo Da Silva
- Where Do We Go from Here? (1945) - Christopher Columbus
- Mischievous Susana (1945) - Conde Mauricio Tonescu
- A Bell for Adano (1945) - Gargano - Chief of Police
- Man Alive (1945) - Prof. Zorado
- Hit the Hay (1945) - Mario Alvini
- The Red Dragon (1945) - Insp. Luis Carvero
- The Sailor Takes a Wife (1945) - Telephone Man (uncredited)
- Pepita Jiménez (1946) - Don Pedro Vargas
- Monsieur Beaucaire (1946) - Don Carlos
- Fiesta (1947) - Antonio Morales
- The Kneeling Goddess (1947) - Nacho Gutiérrez
- The Fugitive (1947) - The Governor's Cousin
- Rose of Santa Rosa (1947) - Don Manuel Ortega
- Romance on the High Seas (1948) - Plinio
- Angel on the Amazon (1948) - Sebastian Ortega
- Adventures of Don Juan (1948) - Don Serafino Lopez
- Bad Men of Tombstone (1949) - John Mingo
- Whirlpool (1950) - Feruccio di Ravallo
- Nancy Goes to Rio (1950) - Ricardo Domingos
- September Affair (1950) - Grazzi
- Havana Rose (1951) - Ambassador DeMarco
- Thunder Bay (1953) - Sheriff Antoine Chighizola
- The Moon Is Blue (1953) - Television Performer
- Die Jungfrau auf dem Dach (1953) - TV Ansager
- So This Is Love (1953) - Dr. Marafioti
- Second Chance (1953) - Mandy
- Conquest of Cochise (1953) - Mexican Minister
- New York Confidential (1955) - Senor
- Kiss Me Deadly (1955) - Carmen Trivago
- Jaguar (1956) - Francisco Servente
- An Affair to Remember (1957) - Courbet
- The Saga of Hemp Brown (1958) - Serge Bolanos
- Thunder in the Sun (1959) - Fernando Christophe
- The Running Man (1963) - Spanish Bank Manager
- La muerte silba un blues (1964) - Comisario Fenton (final film role)
