= The House of the Fox =

1945 film

- Directed by: Juan José Ortega
- Written by: Luis G. Basurto; Xavier Villaurrutia
- Produced by: Juan José Ortega
- Starring: Virginia Fábregas; Isabela Corona; Alberto Galán
- Cinematography: Domingo Carrillo
- Edited by: Juan José Marino
- Music by: Gonzalo Curiel
- Production company: Compañía Cinematográfica Mexicana
- Distributed by: Filmex (U.S.)
- Release date: 6 December 1945 (Mexico)
- Running time: 89 minutes
- Country: Mexico
- Language: Spanish

The House of the Fox (Spanish: La casa de la zorra) is a 1945 Mexican musical comedy film directed and produced by Juan José Ortega. It stars Virginia Fábregas, Isabela Corona, and Alberto Galán.

The film was released on 6 December 1945 at the Palacio cinema.

== Plot ==
A woman nicknamed "La zorra" ("The Fox") runs a gambling house. She welcomes the arrival of her son with great joy. However, "La zorra" learns that her business is on the verge of bankruptcy because of the wasteful spending of her son, who plans to escape and elope with a young woman whom he falls in love with.

== Cast ==
- Virginia Fábregas as Señora Adriana / La zorra
- Isabela Corona as Nancy
- Alberto Galán as Carlos Velasco
- Sara Guasch as Isabel Manrique (as Sara Guash)
- Susana Guízar as Teresa
- Ricardo Montalbán as Alberto Salcedo
- Carlos Orellana as Ancona
- Andrea Palma as Lucía Velasco
- Andrés Soler as Esteban
- Julio Villarreal as Don Julio
- Manolo Fábregas as Drunk Man at Gambling House
- Felipe Montoya as Fernández
- Fanny Schiller as Party Guest
- Mimí Derba as Ambassador's Wife
- Roberto Cañedo as Julio's Employee
- Carlos Villarías as Ambassador
- Lola Tinoco as Lupe, maid (as Dolores Tinoco)
- Estanislao Shilinsky as Drunk Man's Friend (as Schillinsky)
- Luis Aceves Castañeda as Man in Gambling House (uncredited)
- Daniel Arroyo as Party Guest (uncredited)
- Manuel Buendía as Card Dealer (uncredited)
- Ricardo Carti as Party Guest (uncredited)
- Roberto Corell as French Florist (uncredited)
- Ana María Hernández as Party Guest (uncredited)
- Héctor Mateos as Man in Gambling House (uncredited)
- Rubén Márquez as Man in Gambling House (uncredited)
- Daniel Pastor as Héctor, Lucía's son (uncredited)
- Ignacio Peón as Bartender (uncredited)
- José Luis Rojas as Man in Gambling House (uncredited)
- Manuel Trejo Morales as Man in Gambling House (uncredited)
- Aurora Zermeño as Alberto's Friend (uncredited)
