= Where Are Our Children Going? =

- Directed by: Benito Alazraki
- Written by: Rodolfo Usigli (play); Francisco Cabrera; Benito Alazraki
- Produced by: Francisco Cabrera
- Starring: Dolores del Río
- Cinematography: Agustín Martínez Solares
- Edited by: Rafael Ceballos
- Music by: Gonzalo Curiel
- Distributed by: FILMEX
- Release date: 26 June 1958
- Running time: 94 minutes
- Country: Mexico
- Language: Spanish

Where Are Our Children Going? (Spanish: ¿Adónde van nuestros hijos?) is a 1958 Mexican drama film directed by Benito Alazraki. It was released in 1958. It starred Dolores del Río, and was based on the play Half Tone (Medio tono) by Rodolfo Usigli.

== Plot ==
Martín (Tito Junco) is a bureaucrat who lives with his wife Rosa (Dolores del Río) and their children Julio, Gabriela, Sara, Victor, and little Martín. When each of their children begins to face problems of life, Martín and Rosa reach a point in their long relationship in which indecision and clashes seem to become daily bread, and their marriage will be in danger ... together with the family unit of their children.

== Cast ==
- Dolores del Río - as Rosa
- Tito Junco - as Martín
- Ana Bertha Lepe - as Gabriela
- Martha Mijares - as Sara
- Carlos Fernández - as Julio
- León Michel - as Victor
- Rogelio Jiménez-Pons - as Martín, Jr.
- Andrea Palma - as Carlos's mother
