= Guerilla from the North =

1983 film

- Directed by: Francisco Guerrero
- Written by: Xavier Robles
- Starring: Juan Valentín
- Release dates: July 1983 (Moscow); 15 December 1983 (Mexico)
- Running time: 92 minutes
- Country: Mexico
- Language: Spanish

Guerilla from the North (Spanish: El guerrillero del norte) is a 1983 Mexican drama film directed by Francisco Guerrero. It was entered into the 13th Moscow International Film Festival.

== Cast ==
- Juan Valentín
- Ernesto Gómez Cruz
- Jorge Humberto Robles
- Macaria
- José Carlos Ruiz
- Silvia Manríquez
- Alfredo Wally Barrón
- Isabela Corona
- Alfonso Munguía
- Jorge Reynoso
- Alfredo Gutiérrez
