= La Inmaculada =

1939 film directed by Louis Gasnier

- Directed by: Louis Gasnier
- Screenplay by: Paul Perez
- Produced by: Maury M. Cohen
- Starring: Fortunio Bonanova; Andrea Palma; Milissa Sierra
- Cinematography: Arthur Martinelli
- Edited by: Robert Warwick
- Music by: Albert Colombo
- Production company: Atalaya Films
- Distributed by: United Artists
- Release date: September 19, 1939 (US)
- Running time: 98 minutes
- Country: United States
- Language: Spanish

La Inmaculada is a 1939 American Spanish-language drama film. Directed by Louis Gasnier, the film stars Fortunio Bonanova, Andrea Palma, and Milissa Sierra. It was released by United Artists on September 19, 1939.

== Cast list ==
- Fortunio Bonanova as René
- Andrea Palma as Consuelo
- Milissa Sierra as Concha
- Tana as María Luisa
- Luis Díaz Flores as Luis Angel
- Daniel F. Rea as Homobono
- Julia Montoya as Severina
- Felipe Turich as Nacho
- Raquel Turich as Doña Rosa
- Carlos Villarías as Dr. Torres
