= La tía Alejandra =

1979 film

- Directed by: Arturo Ripstein
- Written by: Delfina Careaga; Sabina Berman
- Starring: Isabela Corona; Diana Bracho; Manuel Ojeda; María Rebeca
- Cinematography: José Ortíz Ramos
- Edited by: Rafael Ceballos
- Music by: Luis Hernández Bretón
- Distributed by: Estudios Churubusco
- Release date: 1979
- Running time: 98 minutes
- Country: Mexico
- Language: Spanish

La Tía Alejandra (Aunt Alejandra) is a 1979 Mexican supernatural horror film, starring Isabela Corona and Diana Bracho.

== Plot ==
The story revolves around the arrival of the husband's elderly aunt, Alejandra, to a family home consisting of a couple and their three children. Although she initially appears to be a loving and understanding woman, over time she suffers severe mood swings, constantly secludes herself in her room, and seems to be shrouded in an aura of mystery. The parents, Rodolfo and Lucía, welcome Alejandra, who even begins to help them with their financial struggles. However, the mystery surrounding the aunt causes Malena, the eldest child, to feel uneasy. Numerous strange things and misfortunes begin to occur within the household after her arrival.

Aunt Alejandra possesses a great fortune which she places at the disposal of her relatives, who feel indebted to her. However, in reality, she begins to destroy the family in a diabolical way, as she attempts to teach witchcraft to the children. She has a particular fondness for the youngest daughter, Martha, whom she pampers and keeps close to her. The first misfortune befalls the middle child, Andrés, when he plays a trick on his aunt, who then causes his death. Next is Malena, who has loathed the aunt from the start and burns her face by throwing a cup of hot tea at her, accusing her of being a witch. Alejandra retaliates by setting a bedroom ablaze with the girl inside. When Rodolfo blames her for these disgraces and throws her out of the house, the aunt makes him drown in his own bed. After all these losses, Lucía is devastated and concludes that it's all Alejandra's doing. Determined to protect Martha, she sends her away and stays alone in the house with the aunt. Lucía tries to resist Alejandra's curses, but as they grow stronger, she decides to put an end to the aunt once and for all. Only Lucía and Martha survive, but the little girl seems to have learned the aunt's secrets...

== Cast ==
- Isabela Corona (Aunt Alejandra)
- Diana Bracho (Lucía)
- Manuel Ojeda (Rodolfo)
- Maria Rebeca (Martha)
- Lilan Davis (Malena)
- Adonay Somoza Jr. (Andrés)
- Ignacio Retes (Doctor)

== Comments ==
La Tía Alejandra is a curious and unusual, a rarity in the genre of Mexican Cinema. Not strictly a horror film, but conveys concern in many of its passages. It is not explicit in what it shows but rightly fiddles with witchcraft, curses, black magic and Satanism. Not when graphic violence on screen display, but in a subtle way the sample with an elegant ferocity that causes discomfort even viewer.
