= Alberto Galán =

Spanish-Mexican actor

- Born: 20 November 1901; Cantabria, Spain
- Died: 5 January 1977 (aged 75); Mexico
- Occupation: Actor
- Years active: 1933 - 1974 (film)

Alberto Galán (November 20, 1901 – January 5, 1977) was a Spanish-born Mexican film actor. He starred in the 1943 film María Candelaria.

== Selected filmography ==
- Juarez and Maximillian (1934)
- Every Madman to His Specialty (1939)
- Simón Bolívar (1942)
- Another Dawn (1943)
- María Candelaria (1943)
- The House of the Fox (1945)
- Cantaclaro (1946)
- Everybody's Woman (1946)

== Bibliography ==
- Mora, Carl J. Mexican Cinema: Reflections of a Society. University of California Press, 1989.
