= Jaguar (1956 film) =

1956 film by George Blair

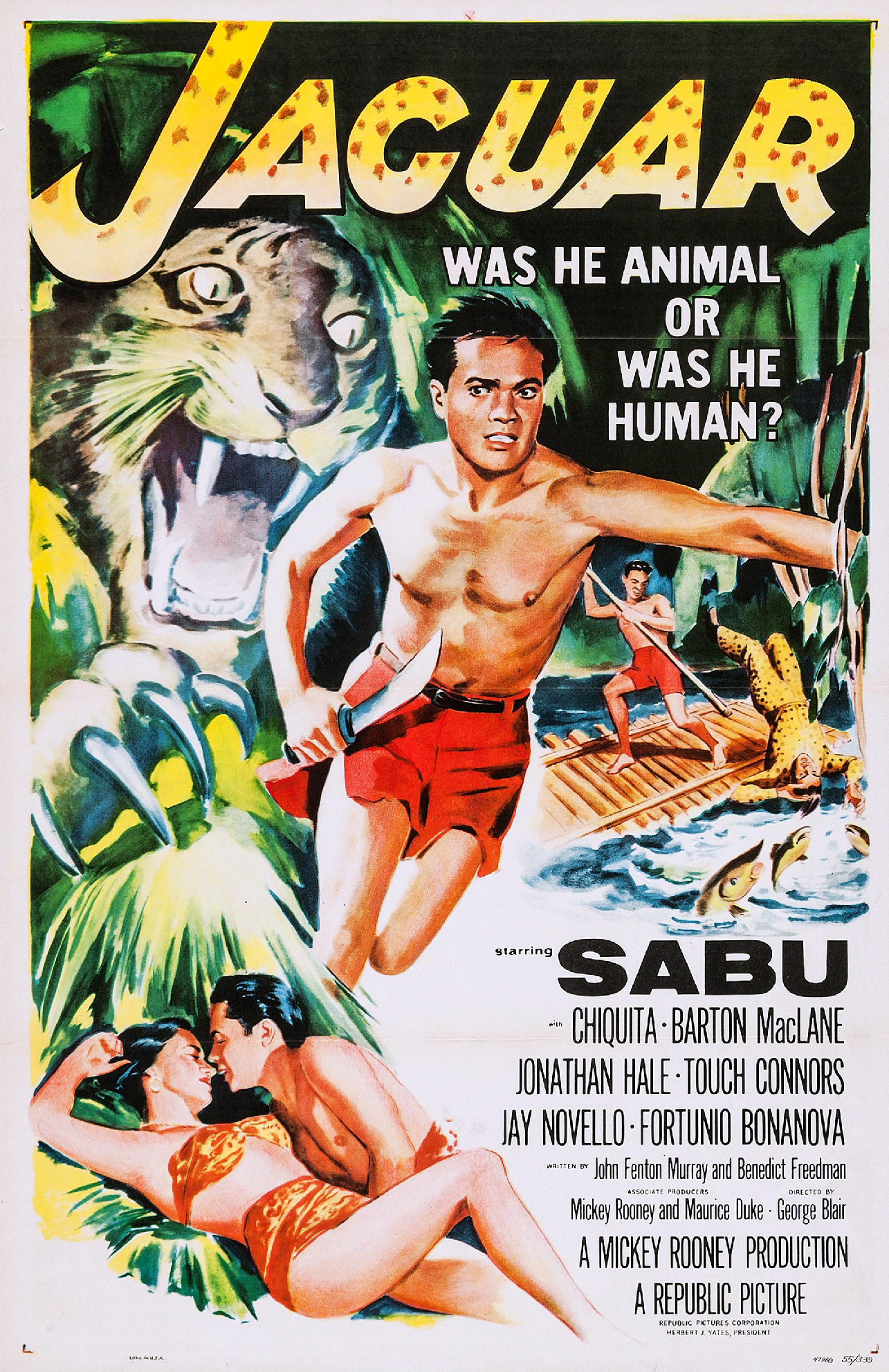
- Theatrical release poster
- Directed by: George Blair
- Screenplay by: John Fenton Murray; Benedict Freedman
- Produced by: Maurice Duke; Mickey Rooney
- Starring: Sabu; Chiquita; Barton MacLane; Jonathan Hale; Touch Connors; Jay Novello; Fortunio Bonanova
- Cinematography: Bud Thackery
- Edited by: Cliff Bell Sr.
- Music by: Van Alexander
- Production company: Mickey Rooney Productions
- Distributed by: Republic Pictures
- Release date: January 20, 1956
- Running time: 66 minutes
- Country: United States
- Language: English

Jaguar is a 1956 American adventure film directed by George Blair and written by John Fenton Murray and Benedict Freedman. The film stars Sabu, Chiquita, Barton MacLane, Jonathan Hale, Touch Connors, Jay Novello and Fortunio Bonanova. The film was released on January 20, 1956, by Republic Pictures.

== Plot ==
Two Americans are hired for an expedition into a dangerous South American (Motilone) area. Mystery, adventure, and drama weave through the film as Americans face some fearsome Motilone Jaguar worshiping warriors. Family members reunite and people die as the deceptive crew search for oil.

== Cast ==
- Sabu as Juano
- Chiquita as Rita
- Barton MacLane as Steve Bailey
- Jonathan Hale as Dr. Henry Powell
- Touch Connors as Marty Lang
- Jay Novello as Tupi
- Fortunio Bonanova as Francisco Servente
- Nacho Galindo as Garcia Solimos
- Rodd Redwing as Porter #1
- Pepe Hern as Jorge
- Raymond Rosas as Young Juano

Uncredited (in order of appearance)
Charles Stevens	Campo Indian
Dick Winslow	priest
Frank Lackteen	priest
