= María Magdalena: Pecadora de Magdala =

- Directed by: Miguel Contreras Torres
- Produced by: Miguel Contreras Torres
- Starring: Medea de Novara; Luis Alcoriza; Tito Junco; José Baviera; Luana Alcañiz; Eduardo Arozamena; Alfredo del Diestro; Arturo Soto Rangel
- Music by: Miguel Bernal Jiménez
- Release date: 1946
- Country: Mexico
- Language: Spanish

María Magdalena: Pecadora de Magdala ("Mary Magdalene: Sinner of Magdala") is a 1946 Mexican drama, historical film portraying the companion of Jesus Christ and his apostles, Mary Magdalene. It stars Luis Alcoriza, filmed in 1945.
