= Andrea Palma (actress) =

Mexican actress (1903–1987)

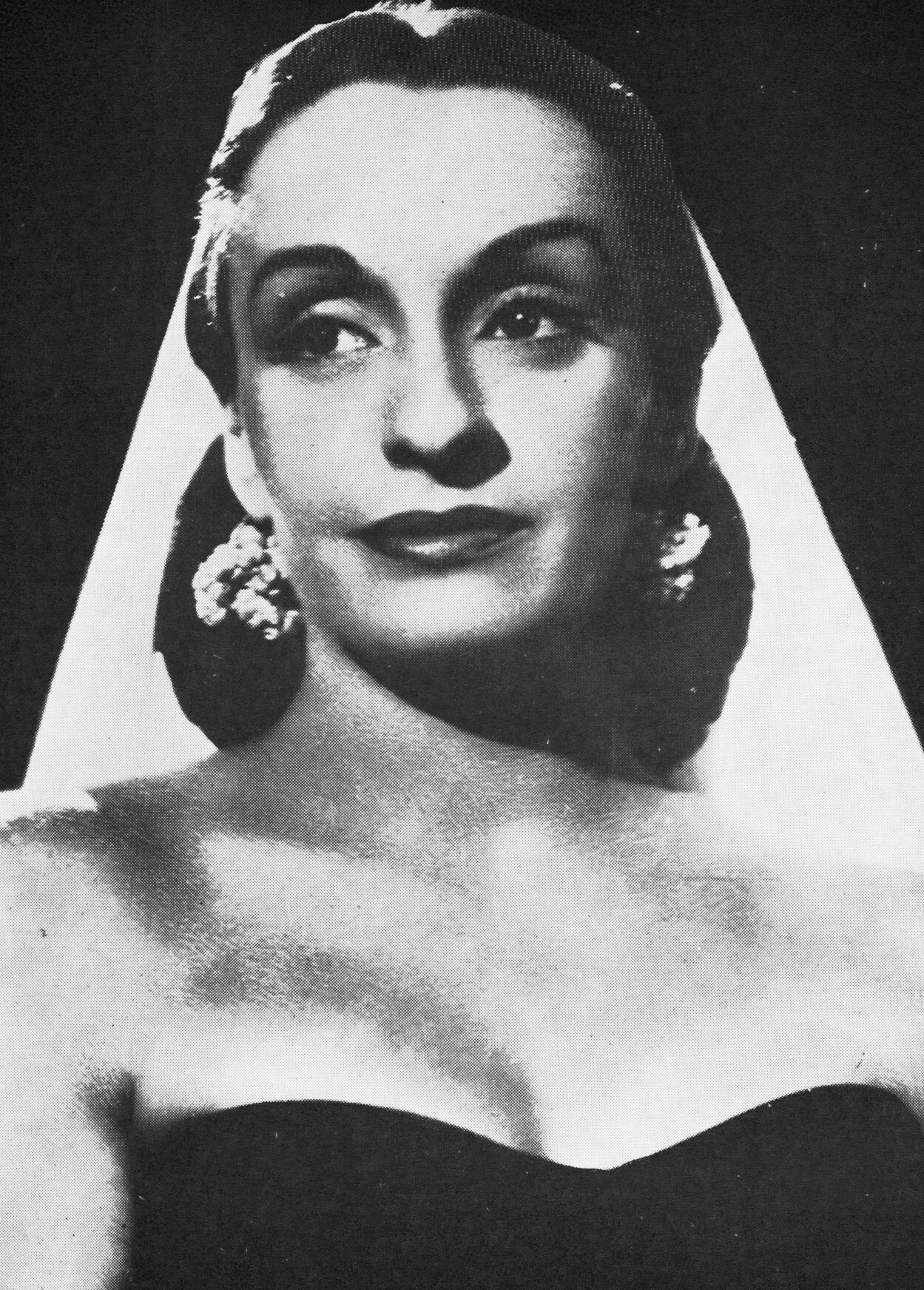
- Palma in 1954
- Born: Guadalupe Bracho Pérez-Gavilán; 16 April 1903; Durango, Mexico
- Died: 11 November 1987 (aged 84); Mexico City, Mexico
- Resting place: Panteón Español, Mexico City
- Years active: 1930–1977
- Spouse: Enrique Díaz
- Relatives: Julio Bracho (brother); Ramon Novarro (cousin); Dolores del Río (cousin)

Guadalupe Bracho Pérez-Gavilán (Spanish pronunciation: [ɡwaðaˈlupe ˈβɾatʃo ˈpeɾesɣaβilan]; 16 April 1903 – 11 November 1987), known professionally as Andrea Palma, was a Mexican actress. She was considered the first major female star of the Mexican cinema after her role in the Mexican film La Mujer del Puerto (1934).

== Early life ==
Guadalupe Bracho Pérez-Gavilán was one of eleven children of Julio Bracho Zuloaga, born in Durango, a wealthy land and textile factory owner who lost all his possessions during the Mexican Revolution. One of her brothers was the film director Julio Bracho. Her cousins were the Hollywood actors Ramon Novarro and Dolores del Río.

Bracho moved his family to Mexico City, where Andrea became interested in theater during her school years, and later in fashion and hat design. She entered the hat business in the early 1920s and opened her own shop, called Casa Andrea (from where she took her first name as an actress, adding the last name of one of her clients, the elegant Mrs. Palma). Known in the theater world, she had her first opportunity replacing her friend, the Mexican actress Isabela Corona when the actress gave birth to a child.

== Career ==
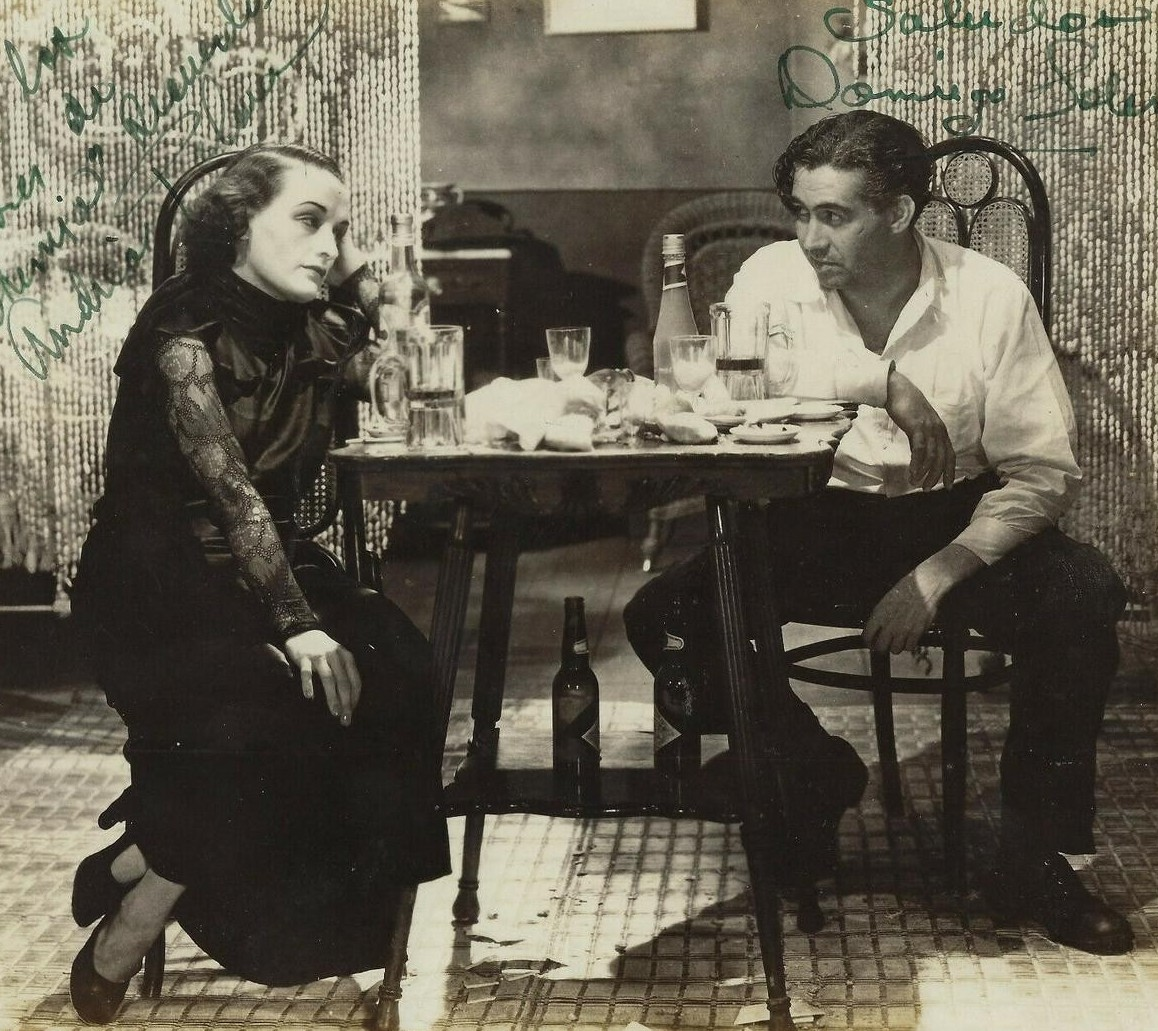
Palma with Domingo Soler in La mujer del puerto (1934)

She closed the shop and remained with the theater company and traveled to the United States, where she stayed until the early 1930s, helped by a young and struggling Cecil Kellaway, having small roles in the films of her cousins Dolores del Río and Ramón Novarro and as hat and make-up consultant for Marlene Dietrich, when the German actress arrived in Hollywood. When she was called from Mexico and offered the role of Rosario in the film La Mujer del Puerto, it was Dietrich's style that inspired her in creating her character.

La Mujer del puerto (1934) became an instant success and Palma became a superstar, practically overnight. In the succeeding years, she was much in demand: her next movie was completely opposite to Rosario, playing the famous 17th-century poet, playwright and nun Sor Juana Inés de la Cruz; she returned to Hollywood to make two "Latin films", took a four-year break doing theater and in 1943 she was directed by her brother Julio Bracho in the classic melodrama Distinto amanecer (1943). She played Julieta, a frustrated wife during the day and a prostitute during the night. She appeared in other movies like El Rosario (1943), Los buitres sobre el tejado (1945) and La casa de la zorra (1945). In 1948, Palma participated in a Tarzan vehicle, Tarzan and the Mermaids (1948) starring Johnny Weissmuller. She travelled to Spain to perform in a play and during rehearsals she met actor Enrique Díaz, whom she married. When she returned to Mexico, she was no longer considered a young leading lady and became specialized in character roles.

In the 1950s she was in two classic Rumberas film productions and huge commercial successes starring Cuban superstar Ninón Sevilla and directed by Alberto Gout, playing a mean brothel owner in Aventurera (1950) and a suffering wife in Sensualidad (1951). She filmed other movies like Mujeres sin mañana (1950), with Carmen Montejo and Leticia Palma, and Eugenia Grandet (1952) with Marga López. In 1955 she worked with Luis Buñuel in Ensayo de un crimen (1955). In the late 1950s, she appears next to Libertad Lamarque in La mujer que no tuvo infancia (1956); María Félix in Miercoles de ceniza, and Dolores del Río in Where Are Our Children Going? (1958), among others.

Although she worked in the Mexican film industry until the 1970s, Andrea Palma concentrated in television and theater since the late 1950s, including her weekly appearance as hostess of the popular series La novela semanal, based on literature classics, until her retirement in 1979 due to an illness. Her last role was with her niece and goddaughter Diana Bracho in the series Ángel Guerra (1979).

== Selected filmography ==
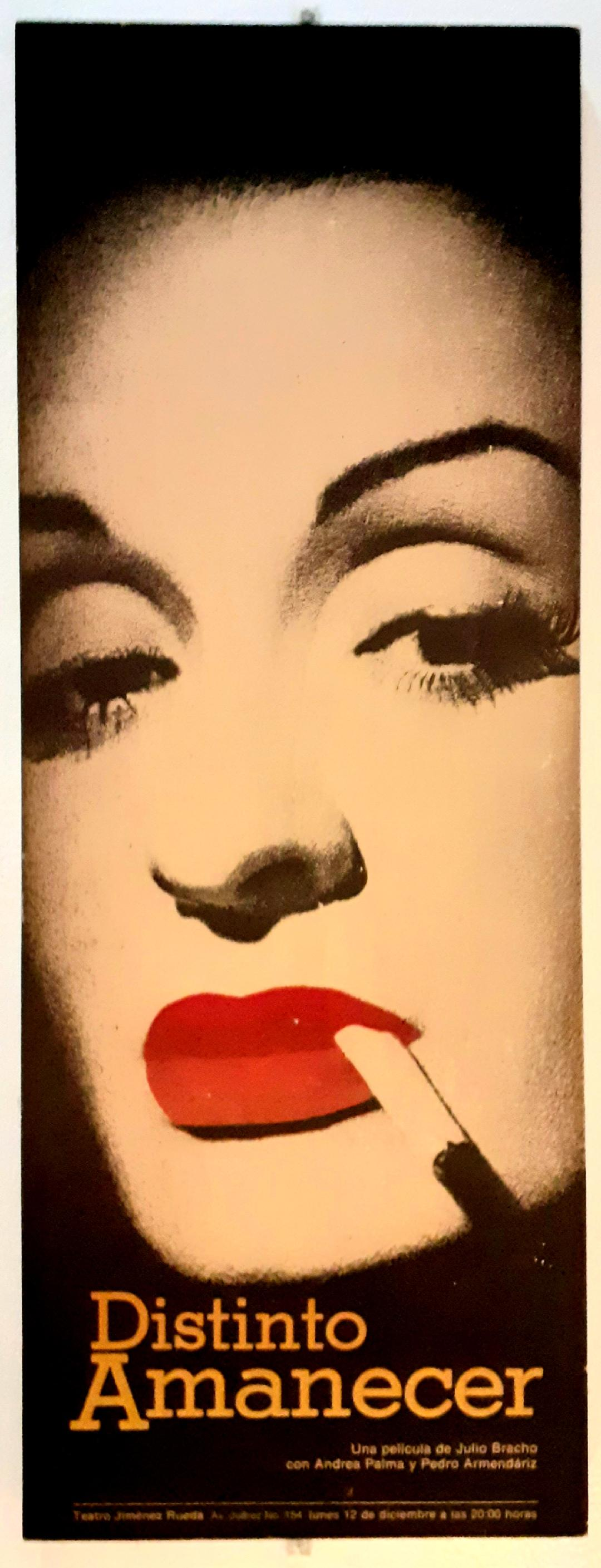
A poster of the film Distinto amanecer (1943) with the face of Andrea Palma

- Girl of the Río (1931)
- Blonde Venus (1932)
- La Mujer del Puerto (1934)
- Sor Juana Ines de la Cruz (1935)
- Ave sin Rumbo (1936)
- Poppy of the Road (1937)
- La Inmaculada (1939)
- Another Dawn (1943)
- El Rosario (1944)
- The House of the Fox (1945)
- Los buitres sobre el tejado (1946)
- Bel Ami (1947)
- Tarzan and the Mermaids (1948)
- Aventurera (1950)
- The Dangerous Age (1950)
- By the False Door (1950)
- Sensuality (1951)
- Beauty Salon (1951)
- Women Without Tomorrow (1951)
- The Lie (1952)
- Sister Alegría (1952)
- Eugenia Grandet (1952)
- Women Who Work (1953)
- Angels of the Street (1953)
- Take Me in Your Arms (1954)
- Ensayo de un crímen (1955)
- La mujer que no tuvo infancia (1957)
- Miercoles de Ceniza (1958)
- Where Are Our Children Going? (1958)
- Mi esposa se divorcia (TV) (1959)
- Espejo de Sombras (TV) (1960)
- The White Sister (1960)
- Teresa (1961)
- Janina (TV) (1962)
- La Familia Miau (TV) (1963)
- La Piel de Zapa (TV) (1964)
- Juicio de Almas (TV) (1964)
- Puente de cristal (TV) (1965)
- El proceso de Cristo (1966)
- El Baron Brokola (1967)
- Lucía Sombra (TV) (1971)
- Muñeca (TV) (1974)
- Mundo de juguete (TV) (1974)
- Pobre Clara (TV) (1975)
- Pasiones Encendidas (TV) (1978)
- Angel Guerra (TV) (1979)
