= Gutenberg Castle =

Castle in the town of Balzers, Liechtenstein

- Burg Gutenberg (in German)
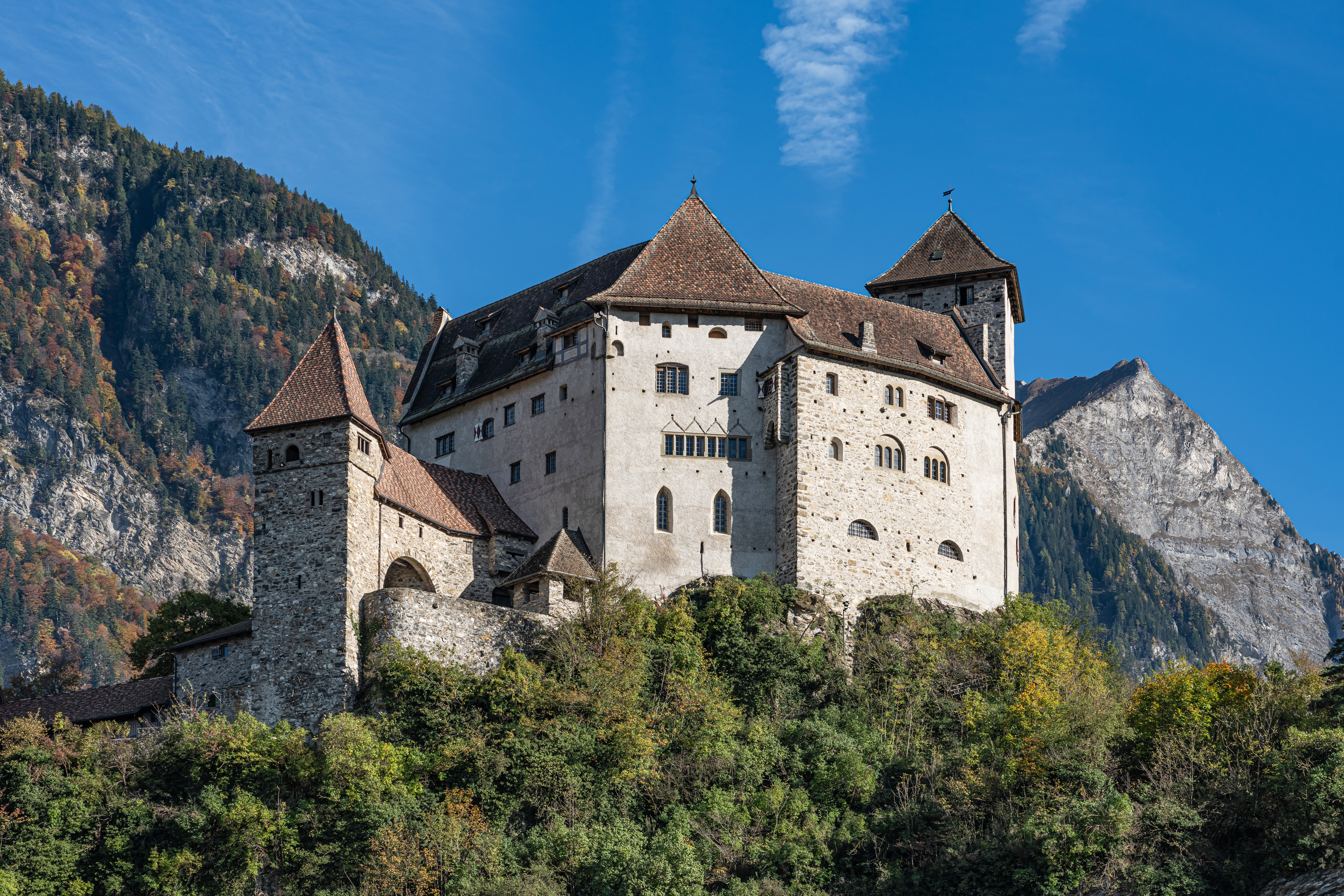
- Interactive map of the Gutenberg Castle area

General information
- Type: Castle
- Location: Balzers, Liechtenstein
- Coordinates: 47.0652°N 9.5001°E
- Construction started: around 1100
- Owner: Municipality of Balzers and the Principality of Liechtenstein

Gutenberg Castle (German: Burg Gutenberg) is an intact castle in the municipality of Balzers, Liechtenstein, the southern-most municipality in the country. Gutenberg is one of the five castles of the principality and one of two that have survived intact until the present day.

Unlike Vaduz Castle, Gutenberg Castle does not serve as a residence of the princely family of Liechtenstein and is open to the general public as a museum. The castle lies on a 70 metre high free-standing rock near the centre of Balzers and is accessible via a street and road known as Burgweg.

== Etymology ==
The first written record of the castle's name dates to 1296.

== Prehistory ==
The castle hill has been inhabited since the Neolithic period. Archaeological excavations have uncovered several prehistoric artifacts, including the 12 cm (5 in) Mars von Gutenberg figurine, now on display in the Liechtenstein National Museum.

== History ==
Gutenberg Castle began its existence as a medieval church and cemetery on a hilltop. In the early 12th century, the cemetery was cancelled and fortification of the former church structure slowly began with the addition of a ring wall, forming a simple, roughly circular keep. During the 12th century, several additions followed, particularly the creation of the main tower by raising the height of the existing keep. Later on, the tower was fitted with merlons. In the 12th and early 13th centuries, the castle was owned by the lords of Frauenberg, a noble family from the Swiss canton of Graubünden. After the death of Heinrich von Frauenburg in 1314, the castle became the property of the House of Habsburg. It was then used primarily for guarding the borderlands between the local Habsburg-owned territories and those belonging to the independent Swiss cantons.

At the turn of the 15th century, the castle underwent extensive new construction works as part of an initiative by Holy Roman Emperor Maximilian I to repair the damage inflicted upon the castle by a siege in 1499, during the Swabian War. Gutenberg Castle was equipped until 1537 with a drawbridge, which had to be dismantled due to storm damage that year. It was never replaced. During the 17th and 18th centuries, the castle ceased to be used for military purposes and was damaged by several fires. It was still being used as a residence around 1750. After a fire in 1795 that greatly damaged Balzers, the castle ruins were used as a source of building material for the reconstruction of the town. The town castle purchased and slightly repaired the castle in 1824, then sold in 1854 to Princess Franziska of Liechtenstein.

The castle underwent substantial restoration between 1905 and 1912, under the supervision of its new owner, Vaduz-born architect Egon Rheinberger. This restoration added a number of new structures and buildings to the lower parts of the castle (see ground plan in references section for more details). After Rheinberger's death in 1936, the municipality rented the castle for various events and guests, until it was offered for sale in 1951, where it was bought by Liechtenstein-born Mexican actress Medea de Novara and her husband Miguel Contreras Torres. In 1979, the castle was purchased by the Liechtenstein government for state and museum purposes. However, Novara held her inherited rights to live in the castle until her death in 2001.

== Today ==
The bailey (Vorburg) of the castle is open to visitors free of charge all year round. The castle's chapel and rose garden, reconstructed in 2010, are accessible free of charge every Sunday between 10:00 and 19:00 during the summer tourist season (1 May – 31 October). Guided tours of Gutenberg Castle and its renting for weddings and cultural events are available only during the summer tourist season and need to be arranged in advance by appointment.

== Gallery ==
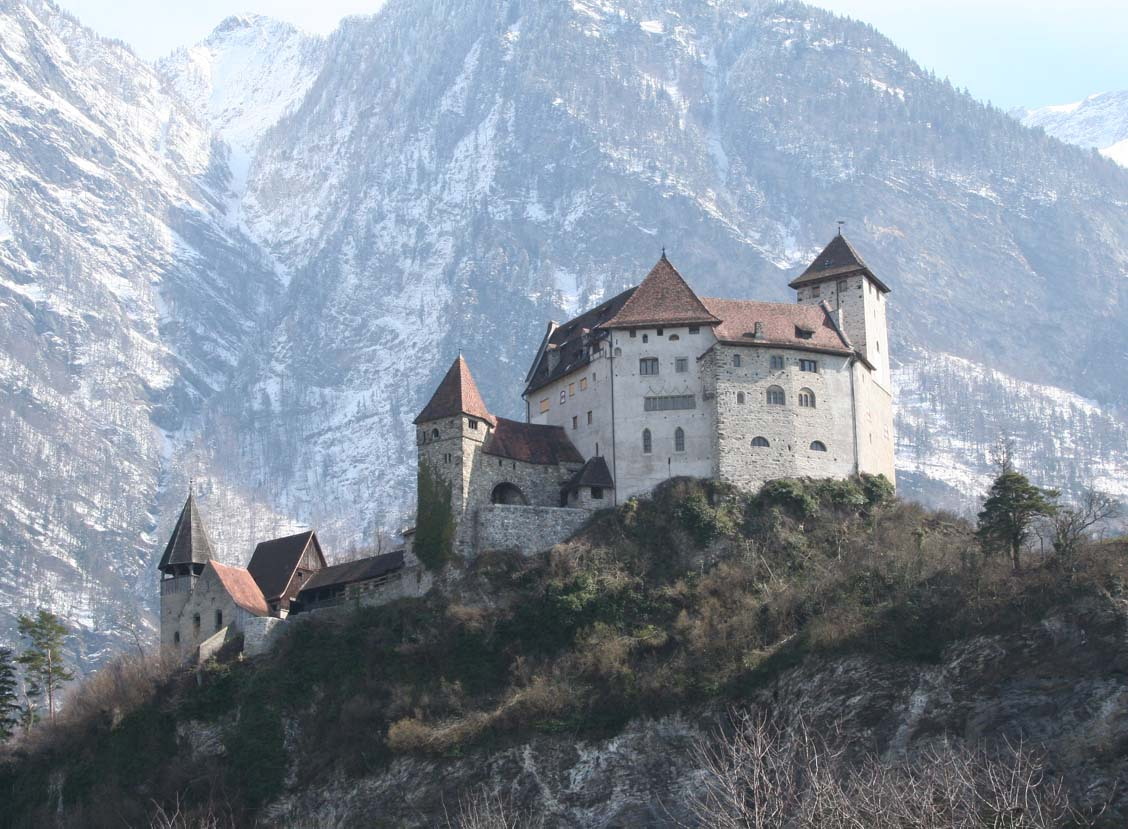
Gutenberg Castle (March 2007)

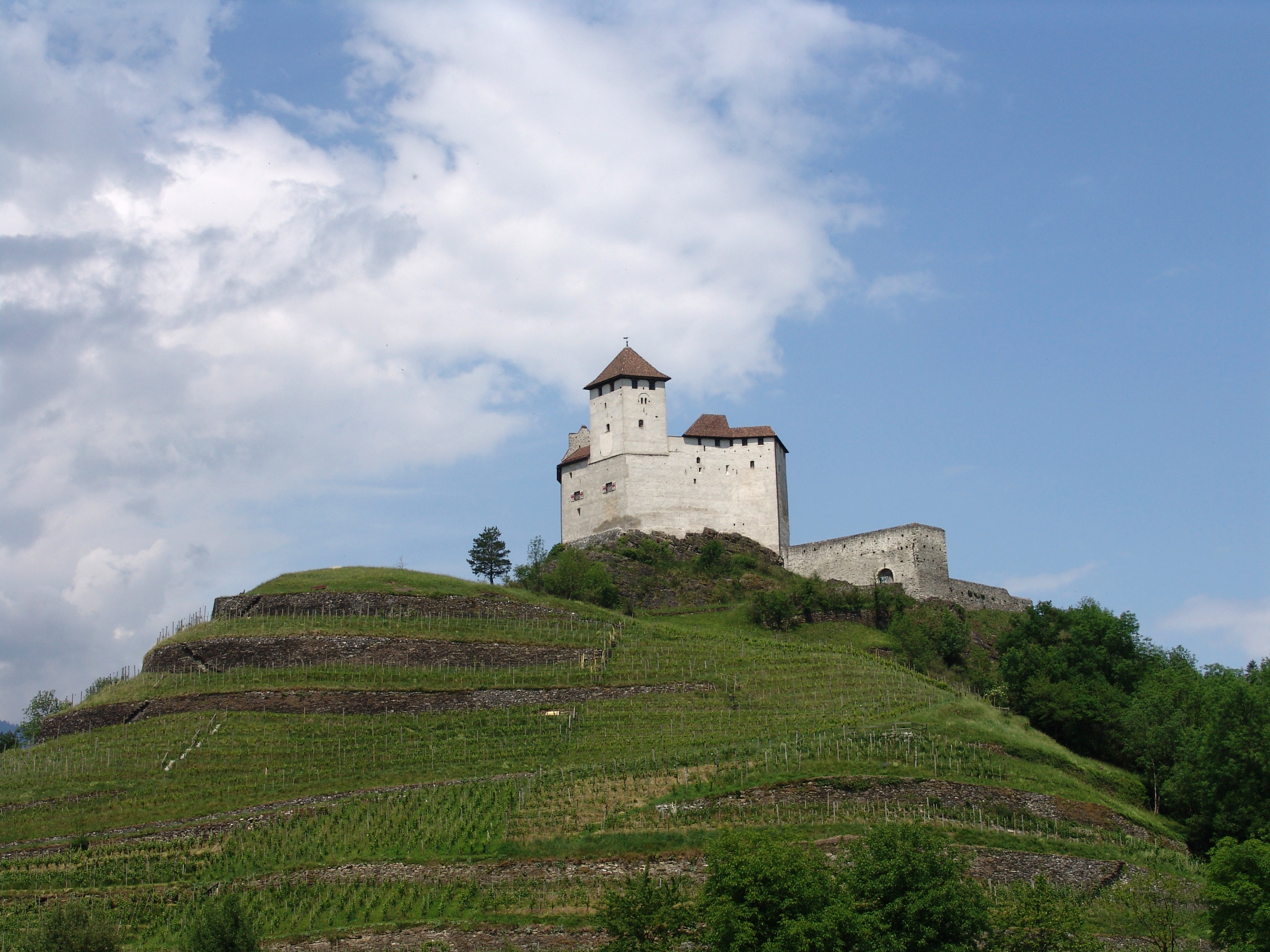
Gutenberg Castle (May 2007)

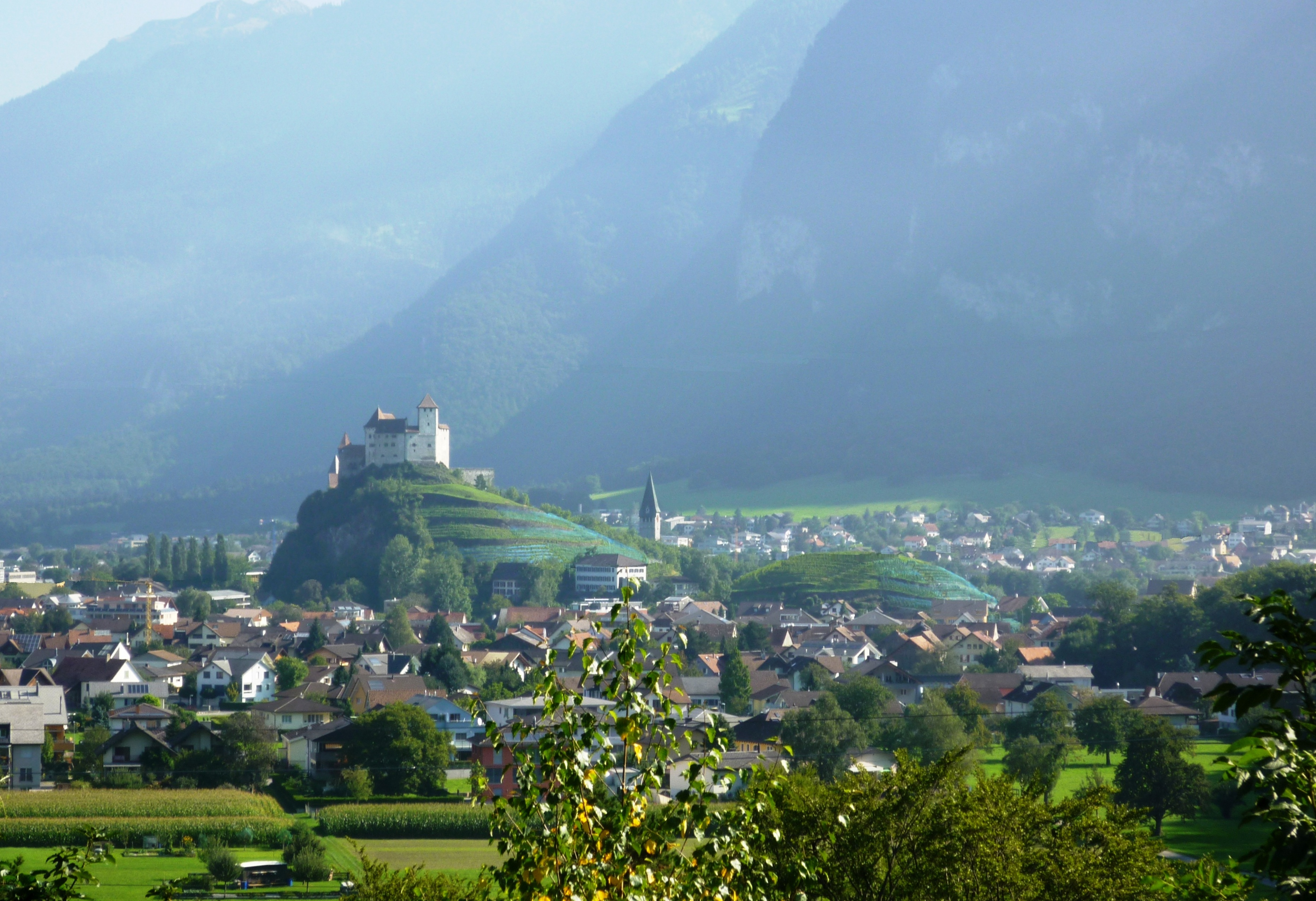
Balzers, with castle hill in the background (2010)

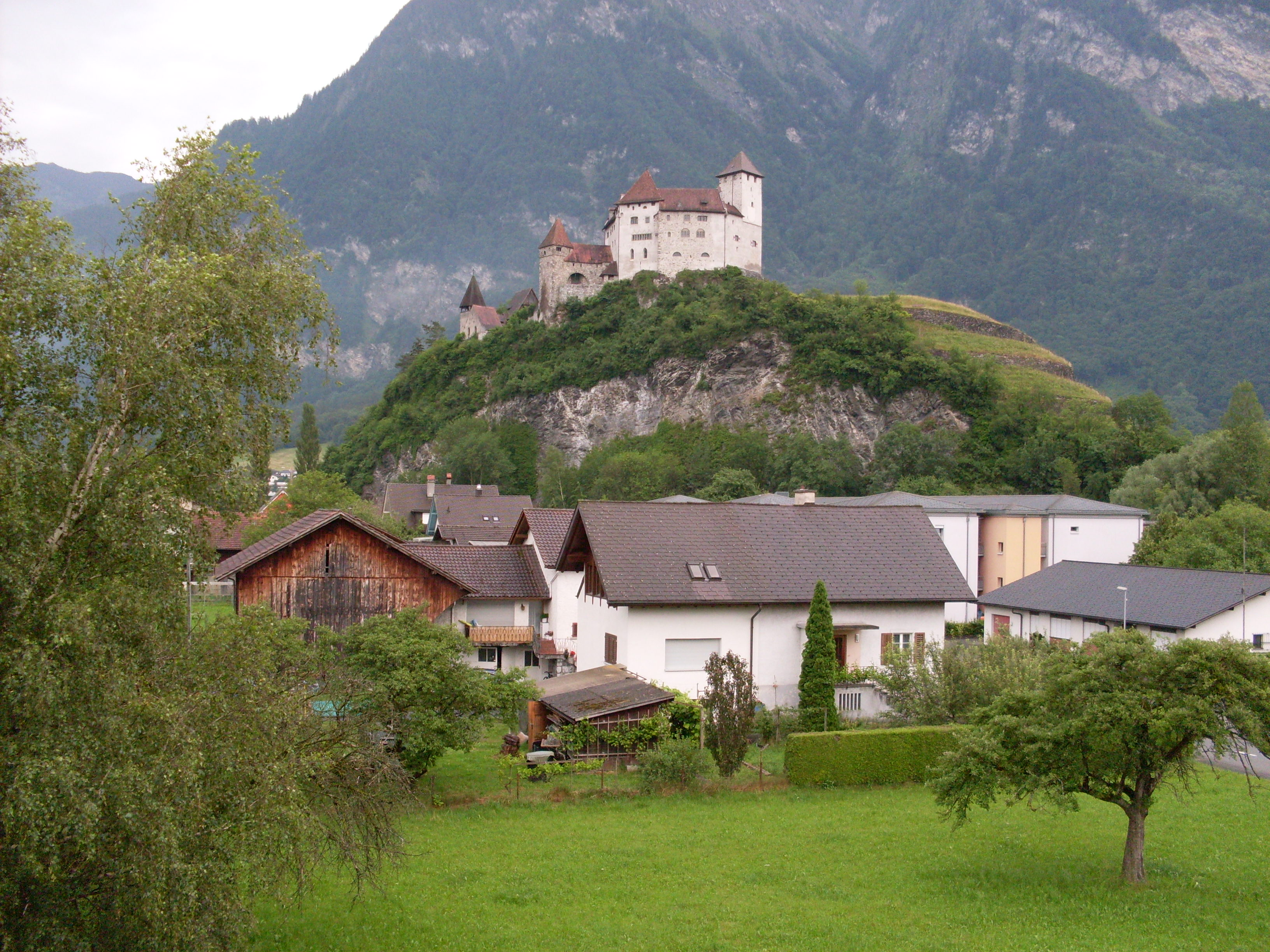
Close view of the castle hill from Balzers (June 2008)

== See also ==
- List of castles in Liechtenstein
