= Reina de reinas: La Virgen María =

- Directed by: Miguel Contreras Torres
- Produced by: Miguel Contreras Torres
- Starring: Luis Alcoriza
- Release date: 1948
- Country: Mexico
- Language: Spanish

Reina de reinas: La Virgen María ("Queen of Queens: The Virgin Mary") is a 1948 Mexican film by Miguel Contreras Torres. It stars Luis Alcoriza. Filmed in 1945.
