= Julio Bracho =

Mexican film director (1909–1978)

- Born: 17 July 1909; Durango, Mexico
- Died: 26 April 1978 (aged 68); Mexico City, Mexico
- Occupations: Film director Theater director Screenwriter
- Years active: 1941–1978 (film)
- Spouse: Rosenda Monteros (m. 1955; div. 1957)
- Relatives: Andrea Palma (sister); Ramon Novarro (cousin); Dolores del Río (cousin)

Julio Bracho Gavilán (17 July 1909 – 26 April 1978) was a Mexican film director and screenwriter.

Bracho was born as ninth of eleven children of Julio Bracho y Zuloaga and his wife Luz Pérez Gavilán. His sister Guadalupe Bracho Pérez-Gavilán became known as Andrea Palma, his brother Jesús became known as theatrical designer and painter, and his brother Toribio became Jesuit and missionary in China. Two of his cousins were Dolores del Río and Ramón Novarro. The family moved to Mexico City in 1913. He was engaged in modern theater projects in Mexico, he was founding member of the Teatro Orientación, and he founded and organized the Escolares del Teatro group, Mexico City, in 1931, as well as the Trabajadores del Teatro group in 1933, and the Teatro de la Universidad in 1936. Bracho directed 50 films between 1941 and 1978. He also wrote 36 for films between 1941 and 1974.

From 1955 to 1957, he was married to actress Rosenda Monteros. In 1973 he was a member of the jury at the 8th Moscow International Film Festival.

== Selected filmography ==
- Oh, What Times, Don Simon! (1941)
- Another Dawn (1943)
- The White Monk (1945)
- Twilight (1945)
- Everybody's Woman (1946)
- The Thief (1947)
- Philip of Jesus (1949)
- Immaculate (1950)
- The Absentee (1951)
- Stolen Paradise (1951)
- Women Who Work (1953)
- Take Me in Your Arms (1954)
- Señora Ama (1955)
- To Each His Life (1960)
