= Sensuality (film) =

1951 film

- Directed by: Alberto Gout
- Written by: Alvaro Custodio; Alberto Gout
- Produced by: Guillermo Calderón; Pedro A. Calderón
- Starring: Ninón Sevilla; Fernando Soler; Rodolfo Acosta; Andrea Palma
- Cinematography: Alex Phillips
- Edited by: Alfredo Rosas Priego
- Music by: Antonio Díaz Conde
- Production company: Producciones Calderón
- Distributed by: Azteca Films
- Release date: 25 June 1951
- Running time: 96 minutes
- Country: Mexico
- Language: Spanish

Sensuality (Spanish: Sensualidad) is a 1951 Mexican crime drama film directed by Alberto Gout and starring Ninón Sevilla, Fernando Soler and Andrea Palma. It was shot at the Churubusco Studios in Mexico City. The film's sets were designed by the art director Manuel Fontanals. It is part of the genre of rumberas films popular during the era.

== Plot ==
The rumba dancer and singer Aurora (Ninón Sevilla), is sentenced to two years in prison for her part in a robbery with her boyfriend, the pimp "El Rizos" (Rodolfo Acosta). Once out of prison, Aurora and "El Rizos" decide to take revenge of the respectable judge Alejandro Luque (Fernando Soler), responsible for sending her to prison. Fate reunites Aurora and the judge, and she decides to seduce him. Without knowing the trap, the judge falls under the spell of the evil woman, forgetting everything important to him: his family and his profession. The judge degenerates to the point of killing and stealing to be near her. His son, Raul Luque (Ruben Rojo), begins investigating the situation, and like his father, falls in love with the perverse woman.

== Cast ==
- Ninón Sevilla as Aurora
- Fernando Soler as Judge Alejandro Luque
- Andrea Palma as Eulalia
- Rodolfo Acosta as "El Rizos"
- Domingo Soler as Comandante Santos
- Andres Soler as Martínez
- Rubén Rojo as Raúl Luque
- Bobby Capó as Bobby Capo
- Kiko Mendive as Cantante

== Production notes ==
The journalist Raymond Borde wrote for Postif magazine: "In this story, Ninon Sevilla is so evil. She seduces the actor Fernando Soler, the prototype of the Mexican respectable parent: she humiliates him, degraded him, causing him sexually. The sexual frustration of the unbalanced man makes him a likely murderer; his fate is uncertain".

The film starred Ninon Sevilla. It was written by the Spaniard Alvaro Custodio. The technical merits of the film and character development led the film to become a hit. The film was released in France, where it was recognized by most critics. François Truffaut, critic of Cahiers du Cinéma, wrote many articles about this exotic unique subgenre of the Cinema of Mexico.

The artist José Luis Cuevas said: "Ninon Sevilla can get to the worst scoundrel as in Sensualidad. In Aventurera, is the victim, but in Sensualidad she's not. This, to the French, seemed surrealism. They loved it. A species of the Marquis de Sade to the bourgeois morality".

== Bibliography ==
- Gunckel, Colin, Horak, Jan-Christopher & Jarvinen, Lisa. Cinema Between Latin America and Los Angeles: Origins to 1960. Rutgers University Press, 2019.
