= Tito Junco (Mexican actor) =

Mexican actor (1915–1983)

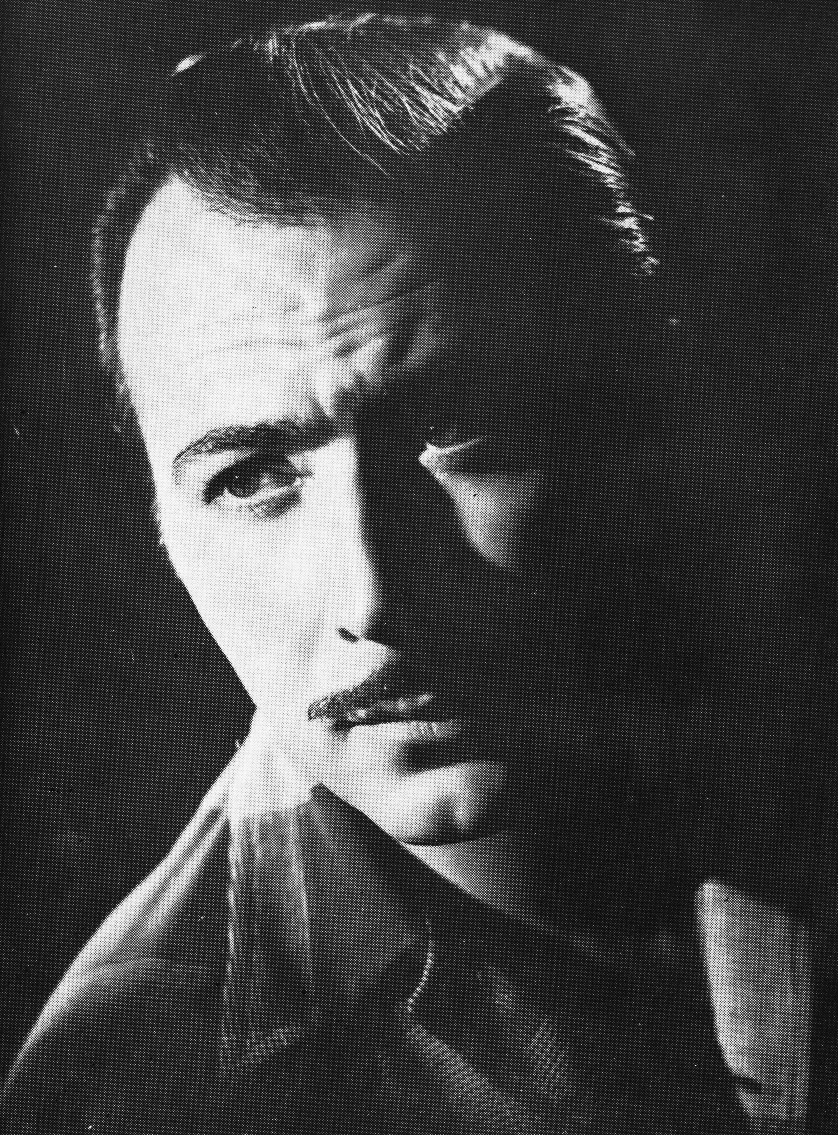
- Tito Junco in 1954
- Born: Augusto Gerardo Junco Tassinari; 3 October 1915; Gutiérrez Zamora, Veracruz, Mexico
- Died: 9 December 1983 (aged 68); Mexico City, Mexico
- Resting place: Panteón Jardín
- Education: Heroica Escuela Naval Militar
- Occupation: Actor
- Years active: 1935–1983
- Relatives: Víctor Junco (brother)

Augusto Gerardo Junco Tassinari (3 October 1915 – 9 December 1983), known professionally as Tito Junco, was a Mexican actor. He was considered one of the greatest actors of the Golden Age of Mexican cinema.

During his career, Junco appeared in about 200 films and received an Ariel Award nomination for his supporting performance in the 1948 film Que Dios me perdone.

== Selected filmography ==
- The 9.15 Express (1941)
- The Count of Monte Cristo (1942)
- Red Konga (1943)
- María Magdalena: Pecadora de Magdala (1946)
- Reina de reinas: La Virgen María (1948)
- Cuatro contra el mundo (1950)
- It's a Sin to Be Poor (1950)
- Our Lady of Fatima (1951)
- Maria Islands (1951)
- Victims of Sin (1951)
- When the Fog Lifts (1952)
- The Border Man (1952)
- Forever Yours (1952)
- The Strange Passenger (1953)
- Remember to Live (1953)
- Where Are Our Children Going? (1958)
- The Life of Agustín Lara (1959)
- Sinful (1965)
- Spicy Chile (1983)
