= Rodolfo Acosta =

American actor (1920–1974)

- Acosta in Death Valley Days, 1965
- Born: Rodolfo Acosta Pérez; July 29, 1920; El Paso, Texas, U.S.
- Died: November 7, 1974 (aged 54); Woodland Hills, California, U.S.
- Resting place: Forest Lawn Memorial Park, Hollywood Hills
- Occupation: Actor
- Years active: 1946–1973
- Spouses: Jeanine Cohen (m. 1945; div. 1957) Vera Martínez (m. 1971; div. 1974)
- Children: 5

Rodolfo Acosta (born Rodolfo Acosta Pérez; July 29, 1920 – November 7, 1974) was an American actor who became known for his roles as Mexican outlaws or American Indians in Hollywood western films. He was sometimes credited as Rudolph Acosta.

== Early life and education ==
Acosta was born to José Acosta and Alexandrina Pérez de Acosta on July 29, 1920 in the El Segundo Barrio of El Paso, Texas. His father, a carpenter, moved the family to Los Angeles, where Acosta was raised and graduated from Abraham Lincoln High School. Acosta studied drama at Los Angeles City College and UCLA and he appeared at the Pasadena Playhouse. At the age of 19, he received a scholarship to the Palacio de Bellas Artes in Mexico City where he studied for three years. In 1943, during World War II, Acosta enlisted in the United States Navy, serving as a Yeoman in Naval Intelligence.

== Career ==
After the war, Acosta worked on stage and in films which eventually led to a bit part in John Ford's 1947 film The Fugitive, produced in part by Emilio Fernández. Fernandez wrote the role of the pimp Paco for Acosta in the 1949 film Salón México, for which Acosta earned a nomination as Best Supporting Actor at the 1950 Ariel Awards. He then was placed on contract by Universal Studios, beginning with a small role in One Way Street (1950). Although Acosta was considered a romantic screen idol in Mexico and South America, his burly body and strong features led to a long succession of roles as bandits, Native American warriors and outlaws in American films. In The Tijuana Story (1957), he had a sympathetic leading role, but in general he spent his career as a familiar western antagonist.

Acosta was a regular as Vaquero on NBC's The High Chaparral from 1967–1969. Other television appearances included Cheyenne, Maverick, Zorro, Bonanza, and Daniel Boone. In 1959, Acosta played the Kiowa Chief Satanta in the third episode entitled "Yellow Hair" of the ABC western series The Rebel. In 1960 on Rawhide, he appeared as Ossolo, an Indian Medicine Man in "The Incident at Superstition Prairie". On the 1964 episode "A Book of Spanish Grammar" of Death Valley Days Acosta played Valdez, the traveling companion of Stephen F. Austin.

In 2013, Acosta along with Lee Marvin and Stuart Hamblen was inducted into Newhall, California's, Walk of Western Stars during the annual Santa Clarita Cowboy Festival.

== Personal life ==
Acosta married Jeanine Cohen in 1945 in Casablanca while he was in the military. In 1956, Cohen accused Acosta of adultery for sharing an apartment in Mexico City since 1953 with actress Ann Sheridan. Acosta subsequently filed for divorce in 1959. He later married Vera Martínez in Las Vegas, Nevada, on September 18, 1971 and they divorced in October 1974.

Acosta was the father of five children. His son, Dante Acosta, is a politician in Santa Clarita, California.

On November 7, 1974, Acosta died of liver cancer at the Motion Picture and Television Country House and Hospital in Woodland Hills, California, and was buried in Hollywood Hills at Forest Lawn Cemetery.

== Filmography ==
=== Film ===
Year	Title	Role	Notes
1946	Soy un prófugo	Esbirro del jefe	
1947	The Fugitive	Policeman	Uncredited
1948	Song of the Siren		
1948	Rosenda	Salustio Hernández (el tejón)	
1948	El gallero	El Meco	
1948	Beau Ideal	German Foreign Legionnaire	Uncredited
1949	Salón México	Paco	Ariel Award nomination - Best Supporting Actor
1949	Felipe de Jesús	Principe Chokozabe	
1949	La malquerida		
1949	Prisión de sueños		
1950	Vuelve Pancho Villa	Martín Corona	
1950	One Way Street	Francisco Morales	
1950	Pancho Villa Returns	Martín Corona	
1950	Between Your Love and Heaven	Miguel Ramírez	
1951	Victims of Sin	Rodolfo	
1951	Pecado	Arregui	
1951	Bullfighter and the Lady	Juan	
1951	The Lovers	Alejandro / Alex Montez	
1951	Sensuality	el Rizos	
1951	Las Islas Marías	El Silencio (The Silence)	
1951	Retorno al quinto patio	Don Pancho	
1951	La bienamada		
1952	Acapulco	Alfredo	
1952	El puerto de los siete vicios	El falcón	
1952	El mar y tú	Don Rufino	
1952	El dinero no es la vida	Martín	
1952	Yo soy Mexicano de acá de este lado	Freddy Miranda	
1952	Yankee Buccaneer	Poulini	
1952	Horizons West	General José Escobar Lopez	
1952	Victims of Divorce	Antonio	
1953	El billetero	Marcos Aguirre Torres	
1953	San Antone	Chino Figueroa	
1953	Destination Gobi	Tomec	
1953	Wings of the Hawk	Arturo Torres	
1953	City of Bad Men	Joe Mendoza	
1953	Appointment in Honduras	Reyes	
1953	Hondo	Silva	
1954	Llévame en tus brazos	Agustín	
1954	Passion	Salvador Sandro	
1954	Drum Beat	Scarface Charlie	
1955	A Life in the Balance	Lt. Fernando	
1955	The Littlest Outlaw	Chato	
1956	The Proud Ones	Chico	
1956	Bandido!	Sebastian	
1957	Trooper Hook	Apache chief Nanchez	Credited as Rudolfo Acosta
1957	Apache Warrior	Marteen	
1957	The Tijuana Story	Manuel Acosta Mesa	
1958	The Last Rebel	'Three Fingers' Jack	credited as Rudolph Acosta
1958	From Hell to Texas	Bayliss	
1960	Walk Like a Dragon	Sheriff Marguelez	credited as Rudolph Acosta
1960	Let No Man Write My Epitaph	Max	credited as Rudolph Acosta
1960	Flaming Star	Buffalo Horn	credited as Rudolph Acosta
1961	Posse from Hell	Johnny Caddo	credited as Rudolph Acosta
1961	One-Eyed Jacks	Mexican Rurale Captain	credited as Rudolph Acosta
1961	The Second Time Around	Rodriguez	credited as Rudolph Acosta
1962	How the West Was Won	Gant Gang Member	Uncredited
1963	Savage Sam	Bandy Legs	
1963	The Raiders	Cherokee Policeman	Uncredited
1964	Rio Conchos	Bloodshirt	
1965	The Greatest Story Ever Told	Captain of Lancers	
1965	The Sons of Katie Elder	Bondie Adams	
1965	Río Hondo	Camargo	
1965	The Reward	Patron	
1966	Return of the Seven	Lopez	Credited as Rudy Acosta
1966	And Should We Die	Gen. Rodolfo Fierro	
1967	The Violent Ones	Estevez	
1968	Dayton's Devils	Fishing Boat Captain	
1969	Impasse	Draco	
1969	Che!	Monje	Uncredited
1969	Young Billy Young	Mexican Officer	
1970	The Great White Hope	El Jefe	
1970	Flap	Storekeeper	
1971	Will to Die	Sheriff Dan Garcia	Final film role

=== Television ===
Year	Title	Role	Notes
1956	The Sheriff of Cochise	Jose Perado	Episode: "Question of Honor"
1957	Lux Video Theatre	Vorbeck	Episode: "The Undesirable"
1957	Playhouse 90		Episode: "Without Incident"; credited as Rudolfo Acosta
1957	Whirlybirds	Don Miguel Cordoba	Episode: "Incident in Del Rio"
1957–1961	Have Gun - Will Travel	Sanchez / John Wildhorse / Pedro Valdez	3 episodes
1958	The Walter Winchell File	El Gato	Episode: "The Stop-over"
1958	Jefferson Drum	Mendoza	Episode: "Bandidos"
1958–1960	Zorro	Carancho / Perico	3 episodes; credited as Rudolph Acosta
1958	Cheyenne	Lobos	Season 3/Episode 17 - "Standoff"
1959	Cheyenne	Luis Cardenas	Season 4/Episode 3 - "The Rebellion"
1959	U.S. Marshal	Captain Joe Silva	Episode: "Gold Is Where You Find It"
1959	Sugarfoot	Rafael	Episode: "Small Hostage"
1959	The Rebel	Satanta	Episode: "Yellow Hair"
1959	The Texan		Episode: "The Reluctant Bridegroom"
1959–1964	Rawhide	Del Latigo / Arapahoe Leader / Ossolo / Chisera	4 episodes
1960	Rawhide	Ossolo	S3:E7, "Incident at Superstition Prairie"
1959–1965	Death Valley Days	Bandit Leader / Tony Alvado / Tall Rock / Valdez / Don Diego Archeluta / Chief Spotted Tail	6 episodes
1960	The Gambler, the Nun and the Radio	Killer	TV movie
1960	Buick-Electra Playhouse	Killer	Episode: "The Gambler, the Nun and the Radio"
1960	The Magical World of Disney	Carancho	2 episodes
1960	O'Conner's Ocean		TV movie
1960	Rogue for Hire	El Tigre	Episode: "Operation Jaguar"
1960–1962	Bronco	Juan Rodriguez / Tomas Fierro	2 episodes
1961	Cheyenne	Luis Boladas	Season 6/Episode 5 - "Day's Pay"
1961	One Step Beyond	Colonel Ferrero	Episode: "Person Unknown"
1961	The Barbara Stanwyck Show	Porfiro	Episode: "Yanqui Go Home"
1961	Tales of Wells Fargo	Red Knife	Episode: "Tanoa"
1962	Maverick	Sebastian Bolanes	Episode: "Poker Face"
1962	The Gallant Men	Lupo	Episode: "Signals for an End Run"
1963	The Virginian	Yaqui Leader	Episode: "The Mountain of the Sun"
1963	The Great Adventure	Lt. Bullhead	2 episodes
1963	Young Men in a Hurry	Jose Rodriguez	TV movie
1963–1964	Bob Hope Presents the Chrysler Theatre	Colonel Lu / Tartar	2 episodes
1964	The Travels of Jaimie McPheeters	Joe Oswego	Episode: "The Day of the Tin Trumpet"
1964	The Farmer's Daughter	Pedro Perez	Episode: "Katy Gets Arrested"
1964–1970	Bonanza	Sheriff Vincente Aranda / Matar / Lijah / Juan	4 episodes
1965	The Big Valley	Rico	Episode: "The Way to Kill a Killer"
1965	The Man from U.N.C.L.E.	Captain Ramirez	Episode: "The Very Important Zombie Affair"
1965–1966	Daniel Boone	Running Fox / Gabriel	2 episodes
1966	Iron Horse	Corporal	Episode: "Cougar Man"
1966	The Fugitive	First Mexican	Episode: "Wine Is a Traitor"
1967	Laredo	Luis Canzano	Episode: "Scourge of San Rosa"
1967	Valley of Mystery	Manuel Sanchez	TV movie
1967	Custer	Satanta	Episode: "Sabers in the Sun"
1967	Stranger on the Run	Mercurio	TV movie
1967–1969	The High Chaparral	Vaquero	22 episodes
1969	Mission: Impossible	Presidente Miguel De Varo	Episode: "The Vault"
1969	The Outcasts	Chief Frente	Episode: "The Stalking Devil"
1970	Run, Simon, Run	Manuel	TV movie
1971	The Bold Ones: The Lawyers	Pablo Delgado	Episode: "The Search for Leslie Grey"
1971	Cade's County	Nacho Gutierrez	Episode: "Crisscross"
1971	O'Hara, U.S. Treasury	Caesar Dominguez	Episode: "Operation: Heroin"
1971–1973	Ironside	Sgt. Ramirez / The Police Chief	2 episodes; final role
1972	Hec Ramsey	Kitami	Episode: "Mystery of the Green Feather"
