= Yambaó =

1957 film

- Directed by: Alfredo B. Crevenna
- Written by: Julio Albo; Julio Alejandro
- Produced by: Rubén A. Calderòn; Alberto López
- Starring: Ninón Sevilla; Ramón Gay; Olga Guillot
- Cinematography: Raúl Martínez Solares
- Edited by: Gloria Schoemann
- Music by: Lan Adomian; Obdulio Morales
- Distributed by: Cinematográfica Calderón SA
- Release date: December 25, 1957
- Running time: 85 minutes
- Countries: Mexico, Cuba
- Language: Spanish

Yambaó (also known as Cry of the Bewitched) is a 1957 Mexican-Cuban drama film directed by Alfredo B. Crevenna and starring Ninón Sevilla.

== In other media ==
On June 27, 2014, Yambaó was released as a VOD title by RiffTrax.

== Plot ==
The story takes place in Cuba in 1850, in the era of the Atlantic slave trade. In a sugar cane plantation, Captain Jorge (Ramón Gay) and his wife, Beatriz (Rosa Elena Durgel) live happily and are expecting a child. Their slaves live at quiet peace with them but are not above being punished for their disobedience. One night, as the full moon appears, the sound of drums rises in the air. Yambaó (Ninón Sevilla), the granddaughter of a witch named Caridad (Fedora Capdevila) supposedly murdered 15 years ago, has reappeared. The plantation slaves are superstitious and fear her, believing she will place curses on them as her grandmother supposedly did. Yambaó's arrival coincides with a new outbreak of black vomit that had not occurred on the plantation for decades, and is now attributed to her using black magic. Though Yambaó is not really evil, Caridad constantly pressures her to take revenge on the plantation.

Jorge, who normally stays out of the traditions and customs of his slaves, discovers that they want to sacrifice Yambaó and intervenes. Yambaó swears eternal gratitude for the gesture but also starts to fall for him. Caridad sees this as an opportunity and weaves it into her plan for revenge. Yambaó decides to perform a magic ritual of Santeria over Jorge to make him love her. Her magic spell coincides with Jorge contracting the disease and falling ill. The only medical doctors in the area are themselves ill and cannot come to treat Jorge's critical condition. Yambaó offers to cure him in gratitude for saving her life and is permitted to try despite some initial protest from his slaves. The prolonged contact with Jorge cements Yambaó's feelings for him and is reciprocated when he recovers, which leads her to believe her love spell worked.

For several weeks Jorge is infatuated with Yambaó, forgetting his wife, his plantation and shirking all his duties. However, when Jorge is informed that his wife is about to give birth, he rushes to her side and clears all thoughts of lust and infidelity from his mind. Yambaó, heartbroken and jealous, is advised by Caridad to kill Beatriz and her child to get back at Jorge. Yambaó takes a dagger and rushes towards the plantation, eventually cornering Beatriz and her child. But before she can complete her crime, Caridad is discovered by the foreman of the plantation and swiftly killed with a machete. Yambaó shudders momentarily as Caridad's evil influence fades away and then comes to her senses. Realizing what she was about to do, she flees in horror and promises not to cause any more harm. Caridad's body is then subject to a funeral ceremony with exotic rituals which Jorge attends. As the ceremony nears its climax, Yambaó is possessed by Caridad's spirit and rushes over to Jorge in an attempt to stab him. Yambaó, however, cannot bring herself to do it and instead runs to the edge of a nearby stone gorge and hurls herself into it. The film ends with Jorge cradling her corpse as a handful of his slaves quietly look on.

== Production ==
Yambaó was a co-production between Mexico and Cuba and was shot entirely in Cuba. Yambaó is played by the Cuban dancer Ninon Sevilla, who had a long career in the Cinema of Mexico of the 1940s and 50s, particularly in the subgenre known as the Rumberas film. The Mexican actors Ramon Gay and Rosa Elena Durgel interpreted the characters of Jorge and his wife Beatriz. Yambaó was released in black and white for the Latin American market, and in color with a dubbed English track in the American market under the title Cry of the Bewitched.

== Reception and legacy ==
It was nominated for three Ariel Awards winning two for Best Cinematography and Sound Recording.

It was the first Mexican film that openly referenced the Afro-Cuban culture, particularly magical and religious rituals, such as Santeria.

== Cast ==
- Ninón Sevilla as Yambaó
- Ramón Gay as Jorge
- Rosa Elena Durgel as Beatriz
- Fedora Capdevila as Caridad
- Olga Guillot as Singer slave
- Martha Jean-Claude as Singer in Sacrifice
