= Angels of the Street (1953 film) =

- Directed by: Agustín P. Delgado
- Starring: Andrea Palma
- Release date: 1953
- Countries: Cuba; Mexico
- Language: Spanish

Angels of the Street (Spanish: Ángeles de la calle) is a 1953 Cuban-Mexican drama film directed by Agustín P. Delgado.

== Cast ==
- Rolando Barral as Pititi
- Hortensia Betancourt as Mariposa
- Jaime Calpe
- Emilia Guiú as Magda
- Andrea Palma as Regla
- Ismael Pérez
- Gustavo Rojo
- Enrique Santisteban
- Lupe Suárez as Brigida

== Bibliography ==
- Alfonso J. García Osuna. The Cuban Filmography: 1897 through 2001. McFarland, 2003.
