= Juarez and Maximilian =

1934 film directed by Miguel Contreras Torres

- Starring: Carlos Orellana
- Distributed by: Columbia Pictures
- Release date: 1934
- Country: Mexico
- Language: Spanish
- Budget: $140,000

Juarez or Juarez and Maximilian (Spanish: Juárez y Maximiliano) is a 1934 Mexican historical drama film directed by Miguel Contreras Torres and Raphael J. Sevilla. The film is set during the French intervention in Mexico during the 1860s, and features the battle between Maximilian I of Mexico and Benito Juárez.

The theme is based on the 1925 play Franz Werfel called Juarez and Maximilian. The theme is used again in the 1939 American film Juarez. It was one of the few major commercial successes for the Mexican film industry in the early sound era, before the beginning of the Golden Age of Mexican cinema.

It was one of the most expensive Mexican films made at that time.

== Cast ==
- Medea de Novara as Carlota
- Enrique Herrera as Maximilian
- Alfredo del Diestro as Marshall Bazaine
- Antonio R. Frausto as Porfirio Díaz
- Froylan B. Tenes as Benito Juárez
- Matilde Palou as Princess of Salm-Salm
- Julio Villarreal as Captain Pierron
- Carlos Orellana as Doctor Basch
- María Luisa Zea as Jardinera
- Mario Martínez Casado as José Luis Blasio
- Manuel Tamés as Grill
- Ramón Peón as Tudos
- Luis G. Barreiro as Professor Billibeck
- Abraham Galán as Colonel Miguel López
- Fernando Nava Ferriz as General Mariano Escobedo
- Alberto Miquel as Count Thun
- Godofredo del Castillo as Archbishop Labastida y Dávalos
- Roberto E. Guzmán as General Miguel Miramón
- Jesús Melgarejo as General Vicente Riva Palacio
- Ángel T. Sala as General Corona
- J. Enríquez as General Tomás Mejía
- Victorio Blanco as General Leonardo Márquez
- Alberto Galán as Hersfeld
- A. Sáenz as Count Bombelles

== Bibliography ==
- Elena, Alberto & López, Marina Díaz. The Cinema of Latin America. Wallflower Press, 2003
