= The Mad Empress =

1939 film by Miguel Contreras Torres

- Directed by: Miguel Contreras Torres
- Written by: Miguel C. Torres, Jean Bart, Jerome Chodorov
- Produced by: Miguel C. Torres
- Starring: Conrad Nagel, Jason Robards, Sr.
- Cinematography: Alex Phillips; Arthur Martinelli
- Edited by: Carl Pierson
- Distributed by: Warner Bros. Pictures
- Release date: 1939
- Running time: 72 minutes
- Country: United States
- Language: English

The Mad Empress is a 1939 American historical drama film depicting the 3-year reign of Maximilian I of Mexico (Nagel) and his struggles against Benito Juarez (Robards). Empress Charlotte of Belgium (Novora) is the "mad" empress who has a breakdown when she realizes her husband is condemned to death.

== Cast ==
- Conrad Nagel – Emperor Maximilian I of Mexico
- Medea de Novara – Empress Carlotta of Mexico
- Duncan Renaldo – Colonel Miguel López
- Lionel Atwill – General Achille Bazaine
- Guy Bates Post – French Emperor Napoleon III
- Jason Robards Sr. – Benito Juarez
- Frank McGlynn Sr. – Abraham Lincoln
- Earl Gunn – Porfirio Díaz

== See also ==
- Juarez (1939 film) - Bette Davis as Carlotta
