= Aventurera =

1950 film by Alberto Gout Àbrego

- Directed by: Alberto Gout
- Written by: Alvaro Custodio; Carlos Sampelayo
- Produced by: Guillermo Calderón; Pedro Arturo Calderón
- Starring: Ninón Sevilla; Andrea Palma; Tito Junco; Ruben Rojo
- Cinematography: Alex Phillips
- Edited by: Alfredo Rosas Priego
- Music by: Antonio Díaz Conde
- Distributed by: Cinematográfica Calderón
- Release date: October 18, 1950
- Running time: 101 minutes
- Country: Mexico
- Language: Spanish

Aventurera ("Adventuress" in English) is a 1950 Mexican drama film directed by Alberto Gout and starring Ninón Sevilla and Andrea Palma. It's considered a masterpiece of the "Rumberas film" genre. The film features Pedro Vargas and Ana María González as club singers.

It was shot at the Churubusco Studios in Mexico City with sets designed by the art director Manuel Fontanals.

== Plot ==
The quiet life of the young Elena changes dramatically when her mother runs off with her lover, causing the suicide of her father. Too depressed to remain in Chihuahua, Elena accepts a job as a secretary in Ciudad Juárez. A string of employers sexually harass her and she fights off each one. Hungry and still looking for work, Elena bumps into an old friend, Lucio, who takes her to dinner at a cabaret, promising her a secretarial job and getting her drunk on expensive champagne.

Unbeknownst to Elena, the madam of the club, Rosaura, is watching from another room. When Lucio brings the drunk Elena upstairs, Rosaura offers her 1000 pesos and a room in the home. Still believing she will be secretary, Elena accepts and is escorted into another room. Rosaura pays Lucio, who she knows as 'El Guapo', for acquiring Elena. Rosaura has her maid Petra slip something into Elena's tea. She is rendered unconscious and a man enters her room.

Once the man pays Rosaura and leaves, Elena awakens and begins shouting that she will leave and tell the police. Rosaura summons Rengo, who holds a knife to Elena's face as she pleads for mercy. She is forced to submit and becomes a dancer in Rosaura's cabaret. Lucio watches her performance and attempts to offer her protection, but she ignores him and goes to a client's table. Rosaura repeatedly chastises her for infractions such as refusing a drink from a client and throwing whiskey in another woman's face, but it all comes to a head when Elena breaks a bottle over the head of her mother's lover. Rengo is once again about to attack Elena when Lucio bursts in, gun drawn, and aims at Rengo. Elena intercedes and gives Rengo money to run away. Lucio then takes money from Rosaura and they leave together.

Lucio and his men are planning a jewel heist and want Elena to be the getaway driver. Meanwhile, Rosaura pays Pacomio Rodríguez for information that would lead to Lucio's arrest, thus ensuring her revenge. Elena is then seen waiting in the car as a drunk approaches her and asks for a kiss. She is pushing him away when she hears sirens and drives away before the police arrive, arresting Lucio and killing one of his accomplices. Rosaura hears this report with Pacomio and is satisfied in her revenge.

Time jumps to Elena as a dancer in a different club. She has received an elegant bouquet from Mario a handsome young lawyer who proposes and begs her to come back to Guadalajara with him. Elena promises to consider it and Mario leaves her his card. He leaves and Elena is preparing for her show when Pacomio reveals himself and threatens to tell the police where to find her if she doesn't let him become her agent and sign a contract giving him 50% of her earnings. Elena stalls and escapes to Guadalajara as Mario's fiancée.

As they enter Mario's palatial home he introduces her to his brother, Ricardo, and his mother, who is revealed to be Rosaura. The two women are shocked to see each other and have a conversation full of hints at their past. Elena convinces Mario to let her stay in a hotel until their wedding and Rosaura confronts her there, demanding her to leave the family in peace. When Elena reminds Rosaura that Mario loves her and would be heartbroken without her, Rosaura instead begs that she treat him with respect.

The pair are married that Friday and Elena gets drunk with Ricardo and embarrasses Mario by dancing provocatively during the reception. Elena repeatedly tests her boundaries with Rosaura, taunting her with her control over Mario, even asking that he use his connections as a lawyer to free Lucio from prison. When Mario is gone for the night, Elena seduces Ricardo, entering his bedroom and kissing him, only to be interrupted by Rosaura. Rosaura confronts Elena, saying that she had only asked that Elena respect her son, and Elena replies that she will humiliate him and ruin the family name. Rosaura attacks and is choking Elena when Mario comes home and discovers them. Rosaura insists that she and Elena cannot live under the same roof, and she retreats to Ciudad Juárez, where she learns that Elena's mother is dying. She gives Petra the number to reach Elena, and Elena goes to the hospital, refusing to forgive her mother on her deathbed.

With Elena now in Ciudad Juárez, Rosaura orders Rengo to kill her. Instead, Rengo becomes Elena's devoted sidekick, protecting her as payment for her kindness. He kills Pacomio, who had threatened Elena again. Elena further embarrasses the Cervera family name by dancing in yet another cabaret, and Mario flies out to confront her. She tells him that they are through, and when he starts shouting and insulting her, comparing her to his mother, Elena takes him to Rosaura's office and reveals everything.

Elena returns to her hotel and finds Lucio waiting for her, demanding that she accompany him across the border. He hides when Mario comes to apologize and ask for a fresh start, but they are interrupted by Lucio, who wants to kill Mario and eliminate the complication from their lives. Elena knocks the gun out of his hands and Mario and Lucio get into a fist fight, leaving Mario unconscious on the couch. Lucio threatens to kill him and forces Elena out of the hotel and onto the street. Mario comes to and begins to look for them both. Rengo is watching from outside, and follows Lucio as he leads Elena down an alleyway. Elena begs him to allow her to return to Mario, giving him all of her jewelry and promising to send financial help. Lucio consents, and as Elena rushes back he points a gun at her back. Rengo throws his knife into Lucio's back, killing him before he can harm Elena. He slinks away and watches as Elena and Mario reunite and embrace.

== Cast ==
- Ninón Sevilla as Elena Tejero
- Andrea Palma as Rosaura de Cervera
- Tito Junco as Lucio Sáenz "El Guapo"
- Rubén Rojo as Mario Cervera
- Miguel Inclán as Rengo
- Jorge Mondragón as Pacomio Rodríguez
- Luis López Somoza as Ricardo Cervera
- Maruja Grifell as Consuelo Tejero, Elena's mother
- María Gentil Arcos as Petra, Rosaura's maid
- Salvador Lozano as Ramón, Consuelo's love
- Miguel Manzano as El Rana
- Pedro Vargas as himself
- Ana María González as herself

== Stage play ==
The film inspired the 1990s and 2000s successful stage musical play produced by the actress Carmen Salinas, adapted for the stage by playwright Carlos Olmos, directed by Enrique Pineda, choreographed by Jorge Becerril. Over the years, the stage production featured Mexican stars Edith González, Itatí Cantoral, Maribel Guardia and many others. The show opened on August 28, 1997, at Salón Los Ángeles, one of Mexico's most iconic dance halls, and it recreated the dance, music and ambiance of Mexican nightclubs during the 1940s. Olmos' stage adaptation featured additional characters not in the movie, including "Bugambilia," a fugitive who poses as a woman entertainer to escape the authorities, and "Comandante Treviño," a corrupt police chief. The music was played live on stage by the Chuy Millán Orchestra, and featured a collection of classic mambo, rumba and cha-cha-cha tunes. A cast album featuring 24 tracks on CD was released in 1999. Over 15 years, the show transferred to various venues, including Teatro Blanquinta, and toured internationally.

A new stage musical adaptation opened at Salón Los Ángeles on June 13, 2024, featuring a new script by Ximena Escalante Muñoz, new musical numbers, and new staging directed by Eric Morales. The story eliminated the characters created by Olmos in 1997, and followed the movie's storyline closer than the previous adaptation, with few slight variations. The production received negative reviews and was a financial failure. It closed on September 8, 2024. Producer Juan Osorio announced that this version would go on tour, but media reports later indicated that the tour will not materialize.
