= Miguel Contreras Torres =

Director, actor, producer (1899–1981)

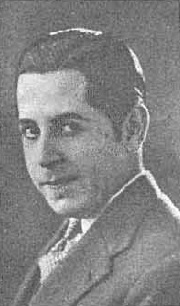
- Born: September 28, 1899; Morelia, Michoacán; Mexico
- Died: June 5, 1981 (aged 81); Mexico City; Mexico
- Occupations: Film actor, screenwriter, film producer, film director
- Years active: 1920 - 1967
- Spouse: Medea de Novara (m. 1936)

Miguel Contreras Torres (September 28, 1899 – June 5, 1981) was a Mexican-born actor, screenwriter, film producer and director. He was married to Liechtensteiner-born actress Medea de Novara.

From 1951 to 1979, he and his wife owned Gutenberg Castle in Balzers.

== Selected filmography ==
=== Director ===
- El águila o el nopal (1929/1930)
- Juárez y Maximiliano (1934)
- No te engañes corazón (1936)
- La paloma (1937)
- The Mad Empress (1939)
- Simón Bolívar (1942)
- Father Morelos (1943)
- Lightning in the South (1943)
- María Magdalena: Pecadora de Magdala (1946)
- Pancho Villa Returns (1950)
- Vuelve Pancho Villa (1950) (alternate version of Pancho Villa Returns, but with Pedro Armendariz replacing Leo Carrillo in the title role
- Under the Sky of Spain (1953)
- Tehuantepec (1954)

=== Producer ===
- Madman and Vagabond (1946)

== Bibliography ==
- Noble, Andrea. Mexican National Cinema. Routledge, 2005.
