= Víctimas del Pecado =

Vìctimas del Pecado
- Directed by: Emilio Fernández
- Written by: Emilio Fernández; Mauricio Magdaleno
- Produced by: Guillermo Calderòn; Pedro Calderòn
- Starring: Ninón Sevilla; Rodolfo Acosta; Tito Junco; Rita Montaner
- Cinematography: Gabriel Figueroa
- Edited by: Gloria Schoemann
- Music by: Antonio Díaz Conde
- Distributed by: Cinematográfica Calderón SA
- Release date: February 2, 1951
- Running time: 90 minutes
- Country: Mexico
- Language: Spanish

Víctimas del Pecado (Victims of Sin) is a 1951 Mexican drama film directed by Emilio Fernández and starring Ninón Sevilla. It was shot at the Churubusco Studios in Mexico City.

Detroit Institute of Arts considers it "one of the most famous post-war Mexican films," and shares that it includes "knockout mambo numbers by Pérez Prado and Pedro Vargas". The film was also released as Hell's Kitchen.

== Plot ==
Violeta (Ninón Sevilla), a Cuban dancer from the Cabaret Changó, rescues an infant from a garbage can in Mexico City's red-light district. She decides to raise the baby but this displeases Rodolfo (Rodolfo Acosta), the club's owner. Santiago (Tito Junco), a rival club owner, falls in love with Violeta and offers his help. Together they raise the baby for six years as father and mother. Tragedy takes place when Rodolfo (Rodolfo Acosta) kills Santiago and is then killed by Violeta, who is then imprisoned, leaving the 6-year-old by himself in the street. At the end of the film, the kind hearted warden finds a way to release Violeta; mother and child can now finally be together.

== Cast ==
- Ninón Sevilla as Violeta
- Tito Junco as Santiago
- Rodolfo Acosta as Rodolfo
- Rita Montaner as Rita
- Arturo Soto Rangel as Director de prisión
- Francisco Reiguera as Don Gonzalo
- Lupe Carriles as Doña Longina
- Ismael Pérez as Juanito
- Margarita Ceballos as Rosa

== Recognition ==
=== Awards and nominations ===
- 1952, Mexican Academy of Film Ariel Awards nomination for Best Cinematography for Gabriel Figueroa
- 1952, Mexican Academy of Film Ariel Awards nomination for Best Child Actor for Ismael Pérez

=== Reception ===
Twitch Film felt the film would be a perfect match to be double-billed with Josef von Sternberg's Blonde Venus.

Without imagining they were on the verge of securing international fame with the film cabaret series performed by Ninon Sevilla, the Calderon Brothers hired Emilio Fernández to direct this musical melodrama that would be more intense and exacerbated than Salón Mexico (1948), the previous raid of "El Indio", into the cabaret environments of the Mexican capital.

As in Salon Mexico, Victimas del Pecado demonstrated the joy of the director in the very particular direction of scenes that take place in the cabaret. The film's tone projects a love of uplifting morale, as displayed in moments of unintentional comedy. One such moment is when the "Pachuco", Rodolfo Acosta, shows his ability to speak more than one language while teaching a French prostitute how to walk with style. Despite its considerable shortcomings, Victimas del pecado has kept pace in the filmography of "El Indio" Fernández and the passage of time has not treated the film so poorly. Figueroa's photography continues to be representative of the filmography of Ninon Sevilla.

The film won an unprecedented success in France and Belgium, where it was known as Quartier interdit (Forbidden Neighborhood or Hell's Kitchen).
