= Juan Pistolas =

Juan Pistolas may refer to:

- Juan Pistolas (1936 film), a Mexican film directed by Roberto Curwood
- Juan Pistolas (1966 film), a Mexican film directed by René Cardona Jr.
