= Star Without Light (1953 film) =

- Directed by: Ernesto Cortázar
- Written by: Edmundo Báez; Ernesto Cortázar
- Produced by: Alfonso Rosas Priego
- Starring: Rosa Carmina; Fernando Fernández; Gina Cabrera
- Cinematography: Rosalío Solano
- Edited by: Alfredo Rosas Priego
- Music by: Sergio Guerrero
- Production company: Producciones Rosas Priego
- Release date: 8 April 1953
- Running time: 100 minutes
- Country: Mexico
- Language: Spanish

Star Without Light (Spanish: Estrella sin luz) is a 1953 Mexican drama film directed by Ernesto Cortázar and starring Rosa Carmina, Fernando Fernández and Gina Cabrera.

== Cast ==
- Rosa Carmina
- Fernando Fernández
- Gina Cabrera
- Alberto González Rubio
- Luciano de Pazos
- Salvador Quiroz
- Acela Vidaurri
- Fernando Torres
- Guillermo Bravo Sosa

== Bibliography ==
- María Luisa Amador. Cartelera cinematográfica, 1950-1959. UNAM, 1985.
