= Adela Fernández y Fernández =

Mexican folk writer and teacher of theater (1942–2013)

Adela Fernández
- Born: Adela Fernández y Fernández; 6 December 1942; Mexico City
- Died: 18 August 2013 (aged 70); Mexico City
- Resting place: La Casa Forteleza
- Education: Iberoamerican University of Mexico City
- Occupations: Writer, playwright and teacher
- Notable work: See Bibliography
- Children: 1
- Parents: Emilio Fernández (father); Gladys Fernández (mother)
- Awards: Sor Juana Inés de la Cruz Prize in 1986

Adela Fernández y Fernández (Note: This article will abridge Fernández y Fernández to simply Fernández past this point.) (6 December 1942 – 18 August 2013) was a Mexican folk writer and teacher of theater. Fernández left behind an important bibliography composed of 14 books of literature, poetry, anthropology and Mexican history, two short films of experimental cinema, and numerous plays. Gabriel García Márquez has described Fernández's literature as "extremely dark, very sad" and her work Aunt Enedina's Cage as being "among the ten Latin American stories that every person should read."

== Biography ==
Adela Fernández was born in Mexico City to the film maker Emilio Fernández and Cuban Gladys Fernández, whom he married in 1941, on 6 December 1942 and Adela would grow up in an atmosphere of cinematography.

She studied acting and dramaturgy at the Cinematographer Training Center of the Iberoamerican University of Mexico City.

On 24 October 2009, Fernández was present at the Andrés Henestrosa Library in Mexico City to give a lecture on the 1946 film Enamorada.

Adela Fernández, a member of the National Commission for the Development of Indigenous Peoples, worked tirelessly to spread and preserve Mexican culture and gave Mexican native history and cultures a place of prominence. Fernández also shared her father's love for cinema, occasionally opening the doors of La Casa Forteleza to hold culture fairs and tell stories of the Golden Age of Mexican cinema in order to honor the memory of her father and his famous house.

She lived surrounded by stars of the artistic world of her day such as Diego Rivera, Dolores del Río, María Félix and Columba Domínguez, among others.

== Death and legacy ==
Adela Fernández died on Sunday, 18 August 2013 at 70 years from complications related to a bowel obstruction. Her remains were veiled and she was laid to rest next to her father in the courtyard of the house.

Upon her death, in Mexico City, Fernández asked to be remembered as "a strong woman who did not allow herself to be intimidated by anything or anyone, who was faithful to her principles and committed herself to the culture of Mexico." As reported by Mexican newspaper Excélsior, Fernández's last words were "Sigan trabajando, sigan difundiendo a mi padre, difundan mi obra" ("Keep working, continue to spread my father and I's work.").

== Selected works ==
- Híbrido and El Perro
- Fernández, Adela (1992). Dioses prehispánicos de México: mitos y deidades del panteón náhuatl [Prehispanic Gods of Mexico: Myths and Deities of the Nahuatl Pantheon] (in Spanish) (Illus. ed.). Panorama Editorial. ISBN 9683803067.
- Fernández, Adela (1 November 1992). Diccionario Ritual De Voces Nahuas [Ritual Dictionary of Nahua Voices] (in Spanish). Panorama Editorial. ISBN 9683803164.
- Fernández, Adela (1 October 1997). La Tradicional Cocina Mexicana: Y Sus Mejores Recetas [Tradition Mexican Cooking: Its Best Recipes] (in Spanish). Panorama Editorial. ISBN 9683802036.
- Fernández, Adela. La Jaula de Tía Enedina [Aunt Enedina's Cage] (in Spanish)
- Surrealist writings:
  - La Trivia
  - El Cadáver Exquisito
  - Escritura Automática
- Short stories:
  - Claroscuro
  - Cotidiano Surrealismo
- Monologues:
  - El Sepulturero
  - Sin Sol... ¿Hacia dónde Mirarán los Girasoles?
- Plays:
  - La Tercera Soledad
  - La Prodigiosa
