= Julio Capote =

Cuban actor (1932–2023)

- Born: 22 October 1932; Cuba
- Died: 8 August 2023 (aged 90); Miami, Florida, U.S.
- Occupation: Actor
- Years active: 1950–2023

Julio Capote (22 October 1932 – 8 August 2023) was a Cuban actor.

Capote died in Miami, Florida on 8 August 2023, at the age of 90.

== Filmography ==
†	Denotes films that have not yet been released

Year	Title	Role(s)
1950	La mesera coja del café del puerto	Ricardo
1954	The White Rose	José Julián Martí Pérez joven
1992	Cara sucia	Fermín
2002	Gata Salvaje	Samuel Tejar
2006	Mi vida eres tú	Lucas Malpica
2007	Acorralada	Lorenzo

== Bibliography ==
- Rogelio Agrasánchez. Guillermo Calles: A Biography of the Actor and Mexican Cinema Pioneer. McFarland, 2010.
