= The Wild Bunch =

1969 film by Sam Peckinpah

- Theatrical release poster
- Directed by: Sam Peckinpah
- Screenplay by: Walon Green; Sam Peckinpah
- Story by: Walon Green; Roy N. Sickner
- Produced by: Phil Feldman
- Starring: William Holden; Ernest Borgnine; Robert Ryan; Edmond O'Brien; Warren Oates; Jaime Sánchez; Ben Johnson; Emilio Fernández; Strother Martin; L.Q. Jones
- Cinematography: Lucien Ballard
- Edited by: Louis Lombardo
- Music by: Jerry Fielding
- Production company: Warner Bros.-Seven Arts
- Distributed by: Warner Bros.-Seven Arts
- Release date: June 18, 1969
- Running time: 145 minutes
- Country: United States
- Languages: English; Spanish
- Budget: $6 million
- Box office: $11 million

The Wild Bunch is a 1969 American epic revisionist Western film co-written and directed by Sam Peckinpah and starring William Holden, Ernest Borgnine, Robert Ryan, Edmond O'Brien, Ben Johnson and Warren Oates. The plot concerns an aging outlaw gang on the Mexico–United States border trying to adapt to the changing modern world of 1913. The film was controversial because of its graphic violence and its portrayal of crude men attempting to survive by any available means.

The screenplay was co-written by Peckinpah, Walon Green, and Roy N. Sickner. The Wild Bunch was filmed in Technicolor and Panavision in Mexico, notably at the Hacienda Ciénaga del Carmen, deep in the desert between Torreón and Saltillo, Coahuila, and on the Nazas River.

The Wild Bunch is noted for intricate, multi-angle, quick-cut editing using normal and slow motion images, a revolutionary cinema technique in 1969. The writing of Green, Peckinpah, and Sickner was nominated for a best screenplay Oscar, and the music by Jerry Fielding was nominated for Best Original Score. Additionally, Peckinpah was nominated for an Outstanding Directorial Achievement award by the Directors Guild of America, and cinematographer Lucien Ballard won the National Society of Film Critics Award for Best Cinematography.

Regarded as one of the greatest films of all time, The Wild Bunch was selected by the Library of Congress in 1999 for preservation in the United States National Film Registry as "culturally, historically or aesthetically significant". The film is ranked 79th on the American Film Institute's list of the 100 best American films and the 69th most thrilling film. In 2008, the AFI listed 10 best films in 10 genres and ranked The Wild Bunch as the sixth-best Western.

== Plot ==
In 1913 South Texas, Pike Bishop is the leader of a gang of aging outlaws – most of them disguised as a U.S. Cavalry troop – who hope to retire after a final robbery of silver from a railroad payroll office. But corrupt railroad agent Pat Harrigan has been tipped off about the heist. Subsequently, he hired a posse of bounty hunters and paroled Pike's former partner Deke Thornton to reluctantly lead them. Spotting the bounty hunters, Pike attempts to utilize a temperance union parade to shield their getaway, which escalates into a bloody, confusing shootout that claims numerous innocent bystanders and more than half of Pike's gang.

Pike escapes with his close friend Dutch Engstrom, brothers Lyle and Tector Gorch, the inexperienced Angel, and a fifth man blinded by buckshot, whom Pike mercy-kills. The loot from the robbery turns out to be worthless steel washers planted by Harrigan. Needing money, they head for Mexico accompanied by the cantankerous Freddie Sykes and cross the Rio Grande to the rural village where Angel was born. The village elder, Don José, warns them about Mapache, a vicious Huertista officer in the Mexican Federal Army. Mapache, a Brigadier general (judging by his rank insignia) who nevertheless styles himself ‘Generalissimo’, has been raiding local villages to supply his campaign against the forces of Pancho Villa. He had hanged Angel's father for supporting the revolutionaries.

The gang goes to the town of Agua Verde, where Mapache has set up his headquarters. Angel spots his former lover Teresa in Mapache's arms and shoots her dead, forcing Pike and Dutch to defuse the ensuing standoff. Mapache offers them $10,000 in gold to rob a U.S. Army train carrying 16 crates of rifles, to resupply his army and provide samples of modern American weapons to his German military adviser Commander Mohr (for historical background see Mexico in World War I and Zimmermann telegram).

Angel offers his share of gold to Pike in return for sending one crate to a band of Piro Indians friendly with his village, ensuring their protection from Mapache. The heist goes as planned until Thornton's posse emerges from the train and chases them to the Mexican border. Pike's crew blows up a trestle bridge spanning the Rio Grande, dumping Thornton and his men into the river.

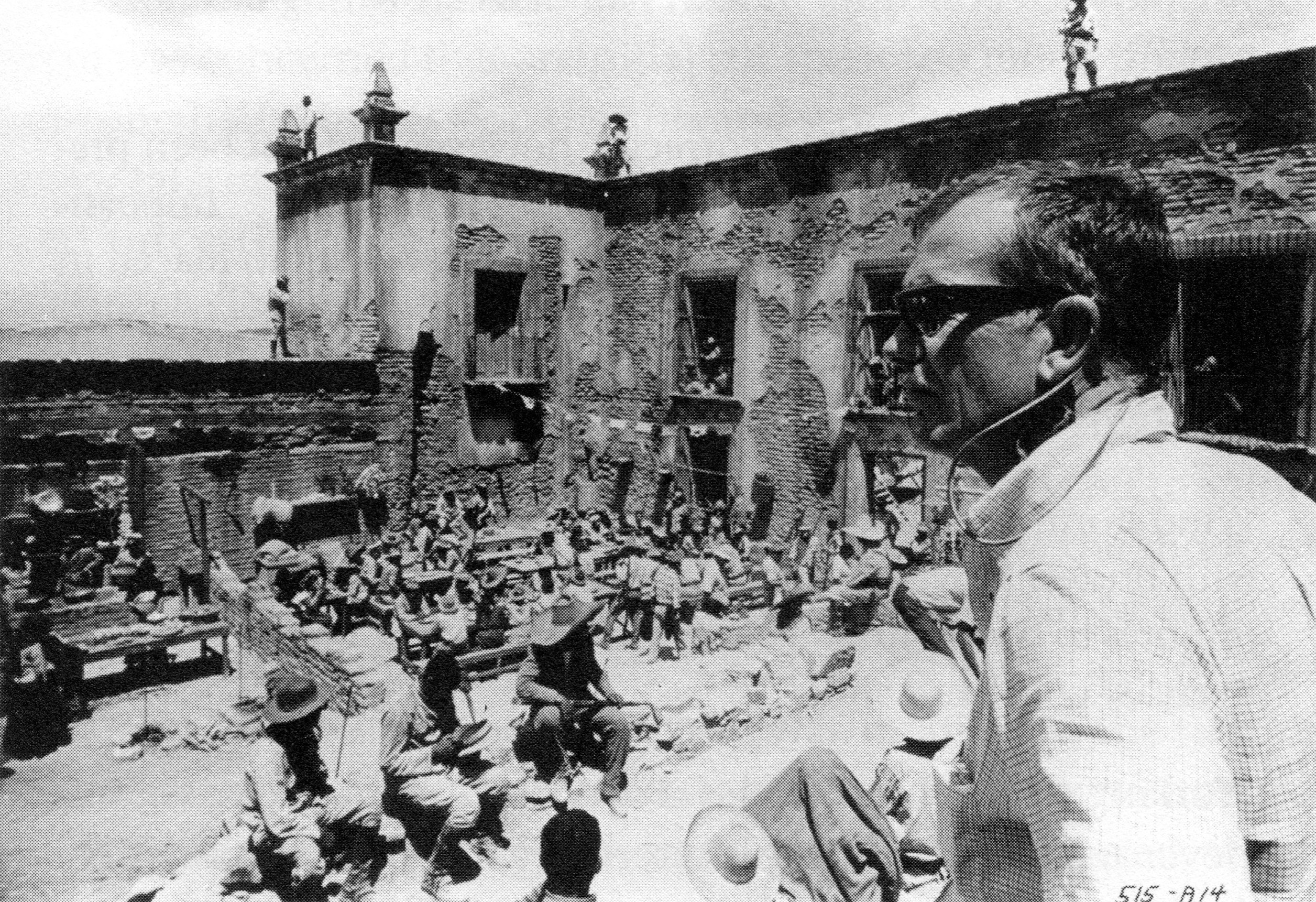
The director sets up the climactic gun battle sequences at "Agua Verde" (the Hacienda Ciénaga del Carmen).

The gang discovers that an M1917 Browning machine gun is among the weapons cache. Pike, anticipating a double-cross, hides the arms and sells them to Mapache in four separate loads. However, Mapache hears from Teresa's mother that Angel stole a crate of rifles and at the final exchange demands he be handed over. Dutch, who accompanied Angel, is forced to agree.

Sykes is wounded by Thornton's posse while securing more horses, forcing Pike to leave him behind. Dutch curses Thornton for working with the railroad, but Pike is more understanding, having abandoned Thornton to be arrested in the first place. The gang buries most of the gold and returns to Agua Verde, where the army is drunkenly celebrating the weapons acquisition. Mapache refuses to 'sell' Angel, who is being dragged through town by Mapache's red roadster, but invites the gang to join the celebration. After a night of reflection in an Agua Verde brothel, Pike and the others arm themselves to rescue their friend.

Mapache seemingly agrees to release the half-dead Angel, but abruptly slits his throat. Enraged, Pike and Dutch shoot the general. As the drunken soldiers freeze indecisively, Pike then kills Mohr. A massive gun battle ensues as the gang fights their way to the M1917 and uses it to slaughter dozens of troops. The gang is soon outnumbered and eventually killed in a hail of bullets.

In the aftermath, Thornton arrives and takes an unused revolver on Pike's belt before allowing the railroad posse to scour the bodies for valuables and take them to claim the reward. Having fulfilled his obligation to Harrigan, Thornton chooses to stay behind in Agua Verde. Some time later, Sykes arrives with Don José and a band of rebels, intimating that they caught up with the bounty hunters and avenged the gang. Sykes invites Thornton to join the coming revolution against the Mexican government; Thornton smiles and rides off with them.

== Cast ==
- William Holden as Pike Bishop
- Ernest Borgnine as "Dutch" Engstrom
- Robert Ryan as Deke Thornton
- Edmond O'Brien as Freddie Sykes
- Warren Oates as Lyle Gorch
- Jaime Sánchez as Angel
- Ben Johnson as Tector Gorch
- Emilio Fernández as Gen. Mapache
- Strother Martin as Coffer
- L.Q. Jones as T.C.
- Albert Dekker as Pat Harrigan
- Bo Hopkins as Clarence "Crazy" Lee
- Jorge Russek as Maj. Zamorra
- Alfonso Arau as Lt. Herrera
- Dub Taylor as Wainscoat
- Chano Urueta as Don José
- Elsa Cárdenas as Elsa
- Fernando Wagner as Cmdr. Mohr
- Ivan J. Rado as Ernst
- Paul Harper as Ross
- Bill Hart as Jess
- Rayford Barnes as Buck
- Stephen Ferry as Sgt. McHale
- Sonia Amelio as Teresa
- Aurora Clavel as Aurora
- Enrique Lucero as Ignacio
- Elizabeth Dupeyrón as Rocio

Credits from the AFI Catalog of Feature Films.

== Production ==
=== Development ===
In April 1965, producer Reno Carrell optioned an original story and screenplay by Walon Green and Roy Sickner, called The Wild Bunch.

In 1967, Warner Bros.-Seven Arts producers Kenneth Hyman and Phil Feldman were interested in having Sam Peckinpah rewrite and direct an adventure film called The Diamond Story. A professional outcast due to the production difficulties of his previous film, Major Dundee (1965), and his firing from the set of The Cincinnati Kid (1965), Peckinpah's stock had improved following his critically acclaimed work on the television film Noon Wine (1966).

At the time, William Goldman's screenplay for Butch Cassidy and the Sundance Kid had recently been purchased by 20th Century Fox. An alternative screenplay available at the studio was The Wild Bunch. It was quickly decided that The Wild Bunch, which had several similarities to Goldman's work, would be produced to beat Butch Cassidy to the theaters.

=== Writing ===
By the fall of 1967, Peckinpah was rewriting the screenplay and preparing for production. The principal photography was shot entirely on location in Mexico, most notably at the Hacienda Ciénega del Carmen (deep in the desert between Torreón and Saltillo, Coahuila) and on the Nazas River. Peckinpah's epic work was inspired by his hunger to return to films, the violence seen in Arthur Penn's Bonnie and Clyde (1967), America's growing frustration with the Vietnam War, and what he perceived to be the utter lack of reality seen in Westerns up to that time.

He set out to make a film which portrayed not only the vicious violence of the period, but also the crude men attempting to survive the era. Multiple scenes attempted in Major Dundee, including slow motion action sequences (inspired by Akira Kurosawa's work in Seven Samurai (1954), characters leaving a village as if in a funeral procession, and the use of inexperienced locals as extras, would become fully realized in The Wild Bunch.

=== Casting ===
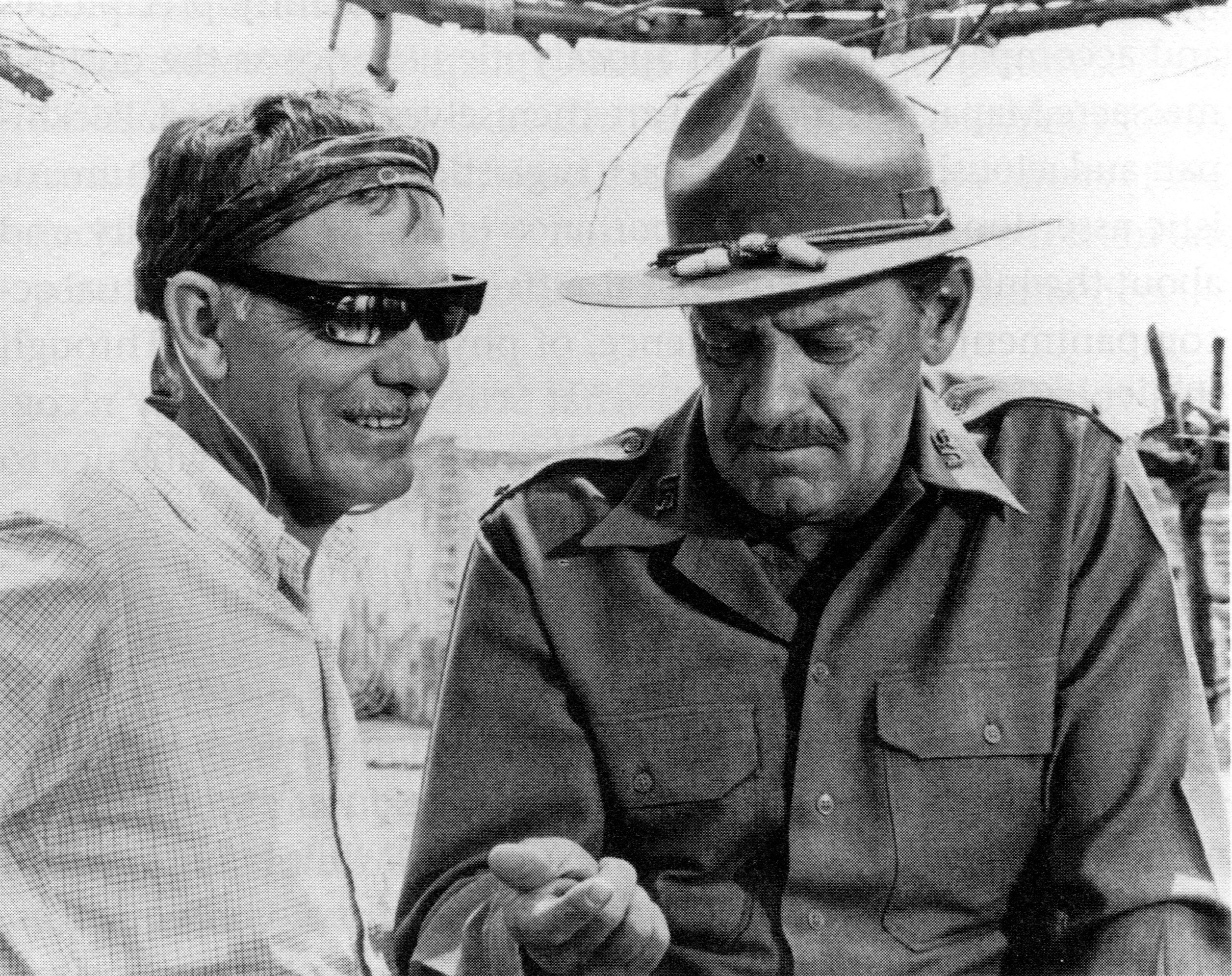
Peckinpah's conception of Pike Bishop was strongly influenced by actor William Holden

Peckinpah considered many actors for the Pike Bishop role before casting William Holden, including Richard Boone, Sterling Hayden, Charlton Heston, Burt Lancaster, Lee Marvin, Robert Mitchum, Gregory Peck, and James Stewart. Marvin actually accepted the role but pulled out after he was offered more money to star in Paint Your Wagon (1969).

Peckinpah's first two choices for the role of Deke Thornton were Richard Harris (who had co-starred in Major Dundee) and Brian Keith (who had worked with Peckinpah on The Westerner (1960) and The Deadly Companions (1961)). Harris was never formally approached; Keith was asked, but he turned it down. Robert Ryan was ultimately cast in the part after Peckinpah saw him in the World War II action movie The Dirty Dozen (1967). Other actors considered for the role were Henry Fonda, Glenn Ford, Van Heflin, Ben Johnson (later cast as Tector Gorch), and Arthur Kennedy.

Among those considered to play Dutch Engstrom were Charles Bronson, Jim Brown, Alex Cord, Robert Culp, Sammy Davis Jr., Richard Jaeckel, Steve McQueen, and George Peppard. Ernest Borgnine was cast based on his performance in The Dirty Dozen (1967). Robert Blake was the original choice to play Angel, but he asked for too much money. Peckinpah was impressed with Jaime Sánchez in Sidney Lumet's film adaptation of The Pawnbroker and demanded that he be cast as Angel.

The role of Mapache went to Emilio Fernández, the Mexican film director, writer, actor, and friend of Peckinpah. Peckinpah first offered the part to German actor Mario Adorf, who had appeared in Major Dundee, but he turned it down due to his discomfort playing such a violent character, a decision he regretted after seeing the finished film.

Stage actor Albert Dekker was cast as Harrigan the railroad detective. The Wild Bunch was his last film, as he died just months after its final scenes were completed. Bo Hopkins had only a few television credits on his resume when he played the part of Clarence "Crazy" Lee. Warren Oates played Lyle Gorch, having previously worked with Peckinpah on the TV series The Rifleman and his previous films Ride the High Country (1962) and Major Dundee (1965).

=== Filming ===
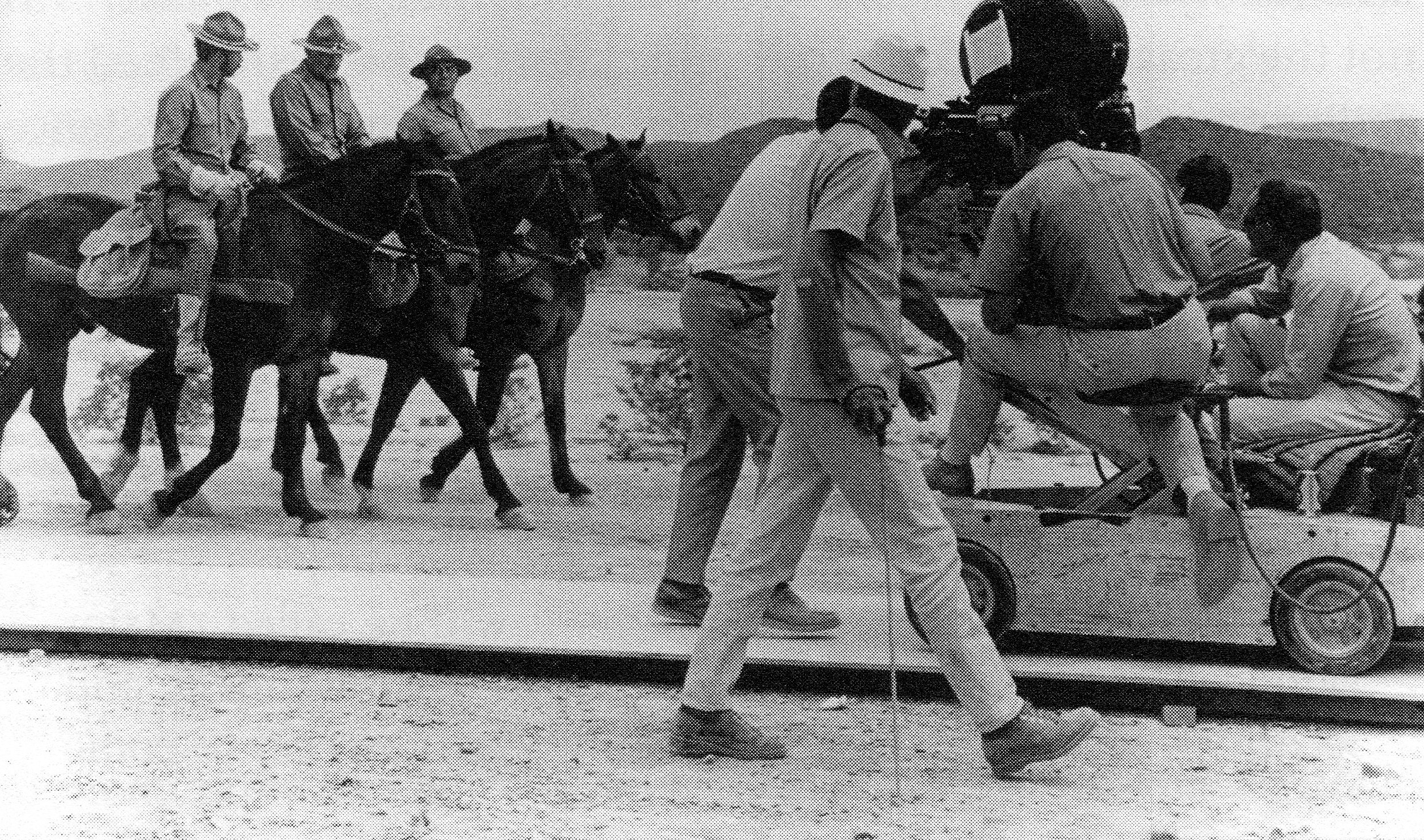
Peckinpah (far right) directs the opening scene as the Bunch ride into Starbuck.

The film was shot with the anamorphic process. Peckinpah and his cinematographer, Lucien Ballard, also made use of telephoto lenses, that allowed for objects and people in both the background and foreground to be compressed in perspective. The effect is best seen in the shots where the Bunch makes the walk to Mapache's headquarters to free Angel. As they walk forward, a constant flow of people passes between them and the camera; most of the people in the foreground are as sharply focused as the Bunch.

By the time filming wrapped, Peckinpah had shot 333,000 feet (101,000 m) of film with 1,288 camera setups. Lombardo and Peckinpah remained in Mexico for six months editing the picture. After initial cuts, the opening gunfight sequence ran 21 minutes. By cutting frames from specific scenes and intercutting others, they were able to fine-cut the opening robbery down to five minutes. The creative montage became the model for the rest of the film and would "forever change the way movies would be made".

Peckinpah stated that one of his goals for the movie was to give the audience "some idea of what it is to be gunned down". A memorable incident occurred, to that end, as Peckinpah's crew were consulting him on the "gunfire" effects to be used in the film. Not satisfied with the results from the squibs his crew had brought for him, Peckinpah became exasperated and finally hollered: "That's not what I want! That's not what I want!" He then grabbed a real revolver and fired it into a nearby wall. The gun empty, Peckinpah barked at his stunned crew: "THAT'S the effect I want!!"

He also had the gunfire sound effects changed for the film. Before, all gunshots in Warner Bros. movies sounded identical, regardless of the type of weapon being fired. Peckinpah insisted that each different type of firearm have its own specific sound effect when fired.

=== Editing ===
The editing of the film is notable in that shots from multiple angles were spliced together in rapid succession, often at different speeds, placing greater emphasis on the chaotic nature of the action and the gunfights.

Lou Lombardo, having previously worked with Peckinpah on Noon Wine, was personally hired by the director to edit The Wild Bunch. Peckinpah had wanted an editor who would be loyal to him. Lombardo's youth was also a plus, as he was not bound by traditional conventions.

One of Lombardo's first contributions was to show Peckinpah an episode of the TV series Felony Squad he had edited in 1967. The episode, entitled "My Mommy Got Lost", included a slow motion sequence where Joe Don Baker is shot by the police. The scene mixed slow motion with normal speed, having been filmed at 24 frames per second, but triple printed optically at 72 frames per second. Peckinpah was reportedly thrilled and told Lombardo: "Let's try some of that when we get down to Mexico!" The director would film the major shootouts with six cameras, operating at various film rates, including 24 frames per second, 30 frames per second, 60 frames per second, 90 frames per second, and 120 frames per second. When the scenes were eventually cut together, the action would shift from slow to fast to slower still, giving time an elastic quality never before seen in motion pictures up to that time.

Further editing was done to secure a favorable rating from the MPAA, which was in the process of establishing a new set of codes. Peckinpah and his editors cut the film to satisfy the new, expansive R-rating parameters which, for the first time, designated a film as being unsuitable for children. Without this new system in place, the film could not have been released with its explicit images of bloodshed.

=== Historical inaccuracies ===
While the film's plot is clearly set during the Mexican Revolution, the specific year is unclear. General Mapache is identified as a follower of Victoriano Huerta, who went into exile in 1914, attempted from there to stage a coup to regain the presidency, but subsequently died in January 1916. However, since both of General Mapache’s German advisors — Mohr and Ernst — speak extremely disparagingly about the US government, it is more likely that the story is set in 1917, shortly before or after the American entry into World War I. With this would fit Mohr’s interest in the American army weapons used or robbed by Pike Bishop's gang — such as the Colt Government M1911, the two pump-action shotgun types Winchester M1897 and M1912 as well as the M1917 Browning machine gun.

Although the American and Mexican uniforms and equipment appear to be historically accurate, this is not the case for the two German characters. Mohr and Ernst are initially seen in civilian clothes, with Mohr wearing the black and white ribbon of the Iron Cross on his lapel. In the final scenes — the massacre — both are wearing German uniforms. Mohr is clearly an officer in the Imperial German Navy (having introduced himself as a Commander, meaning a Fregattenkapitän), but he and his adjutant, Ernst, are shown wearing field-grey Imperial German Army uniforms (rather than the navy's field-grey M1916 version). Even these army uniforms are inaccurate. They erroneously feature silver trimming (Kappellenlitzen) on collars and cuffs, an embellishment that, until 1918/19, was reserved exclusively for Guard formations (Gardelitzen). While the black-white-red Imperial cockade is correctly attached to the peaked caps' crowns, the red cap bands are lacking the state cockades (e.g., for Prussia, Bavaria, etc.). Mohr's peaked cap is depicted with a gold-braid chin strap, whereas a leather chin strap was mandatory at the time (a silver aka golden cord chinstrap for commissioned officers and generals was introduced in the Reichswehr not before 1927). Mohr wears braided golden shoulder boards with two pips of a full general, even though he is merely a commander. Beyond, Mohr’s fanciful aiguillette is attached to the left shoulder (instead of the right one) and is not fastened to the vertical button placket at the front, but fixed directly to the fabric on the chest using a sort of large safety pin. Adjutant Ernst’s uniform with metal braid-edged shoulder boards most closely resembles that of a deputy officer (Offiziersstellvertreter), yet the collar lacks the NCO braid trimming. Ernst’s two golden collar buttons (one on each collar side, indicating the rank of sergeants and senior NCOs) are oversized while the collar's Kappellenlitzen feature an additional silver button — a detail reserved for cuff tabs of the Waffenrock only!

== Themes ==
Critics of The Wild Bunch note the theme of the end of the outlaw gunfighter era. For example, the character Pike Bishop advises: "We've got to start thinking beyond our guns. Those days are closing fast." The Bunch lives by an anachronistic code of honor that is out of place in 20th-century society. Also, when the gang inspects Mapache's new automobile, they perceive it marks the end of horse travel, a symbol also in Peckinpah's Ride the High Country (1962) and The Ballad of Cable Hogue (1970).

The violence that was much criticized in 1969 remains controversial. Peckinpah noted it was allegoric of the American war in Vietnam, the violence of which was nightly televised to American homes at supper time. He tried showing the gun violence commonplace to the historic western frontier period, rebelling against sanitized, bloodless television Westerns and films glamorizing gunfights and murder: "The point of the film is to take this façade of movie violence and open it up, get people involved in it so that they are starting to go in the Hollywood television predictable reaction syndrome, and then twist it so that it's not fun anymore, just a wave of sickness in the gut ... it's ugly, brutalizing, and bloody awful; it's not fun and games and cowboys and Indians. It's a terrible, ugly thing, and yet there's a certain response that you get from it, an excitement, because we're all violent people." Peckinpah used violence as a catharsis, believing his audience would be purged of violence by witnessing it explicitly on screen. He later admitted to being mistaken, observing that the audience came to enjoy rather than be horrified by his films' violence, which troubled him.

Betrayal is the secondary theme of The Wild Bunch. The characters suffer from their knowledge of having betrayed a friend and left him to his fate, thus violating their own honor code when it suits them ("$10,000 cuts an awful lot of family ties"). However, Bishop says, "When you side with a man, you stay with him, and if you can't do that you're like some animal." Such oppositional ideas lead to the film's violent conclusion, as the remaining men find their abandonment of Angel intolerable. Bishop remembers his betrayals, most notably when he deserts Deke Thornton, in flashback, when the law catches up to them and when he abandons Crazy Lee at the railroad office after the robbery, ostensibly to guard the hostages. Critic David Weddle writes that "like that of Conrad's Lord Jim, Pike Bishop's heroism is propelled by overwhelming guilt and a despairing death wish."

== Release ==
=== Theatrical release ===
The film opened on June 18, 1969, at the Pix theatre in Los Angeles and grossed $39,200 in its first week. Produced on a budget of $6 million, the film grossed $10.5 million at the US box office in 1970 and another $638,641 in the US on its 1995 restored box-office release, making a total of $11,138,641. It was the 17th highest-grossing film of 1969.

=== Versions ===
There have been several versions of the film:

- The original, 1969 European release is 145 minutes long, with an intermission (per the distributor's request, before the train robbery)
- The original, 1969 American release is 143 minutes long
- The second, 1969 American release is 135 minutes long, shortened to allow more screenings
- The 1995 re-release (labeled "The Original Director's Cut", available in home video) is 145 minutes long and identical to the 1969 European release

In 1993, Warner Bros. resubmitted the film to the MPAA ratings board prior to an expected re-release. To the studio's surprise, the originally R-rated film was re-rated NC-17, which delayed the release until the decision was appealed. The controversy was linked to 10 extra minutes added to the film, although none of this footage contained graphic violence. Warner Bros. trimmed some footage to decrease the running time to ensure additional daily screenings. When the restored film finally made it to the screen in March 1995, one reviewer noted:

By restoring 10 minutes to the film, the complex story now fits together in a seamless way, filling in those gaps found in the previous theatrical release, and proving that Peckinpah was firing on all cylinders for this, his grandest achievement. ... And the one overwhelming feature that the director's cut makes unforgettable are the many faces of the children, whether playing, singing, or cowering, much of the reaction to what happens on-screen is through the eyes, both innocent and imitative, of all the children.

Almost all of the versions of the film include the missing scenes. Warner Bros. released a newly restored version in a two-disc special edition on January 10, 2006. It includes an audio commentary by Peckinpah scholars, two documentaries concerning the making of the film (one of them is the Oscar-nominated The Wild Bunch: An Album in Montage), and never-before-seen outtakes.

== Reception ==
=== Critical reception ===
Critical reaction in New York was mixed, with four reviewers with favorable reviews and three with unfavorable opinions, although there was debate as to whether the New York Post's Archer Winsten's review was mostly favorable despite asking "was this violence necessary?". Vincent Canby began his review in The New York Times by calling the film "very beautiful and the first truly interesting American-made Western in years. It's also so full of violence—of an intensity that can hardly be supported by the story—that it's going to prompt a lot of people who do not know the real effect of movie violence (as I do not) to write automatic condemnations of it." He observed, "Although the movie's conventional and poetic action sequences are extraordinarily good and its landscapes beautifully photographed ... it is most interesting in its almost jolly account of chaos, corruption, and defeat". About the actors, he commented particularly on William Holden: "After years of giving bored performances in boring movies, Holden comes back gallantly in The Wild Bunch. He looks older and tired, but he has style, both as a man and as a movie character who persists in doing what he's always done, not because he really wants the money but because there's simply nothing else to do."

Critic Pauline Kael wrote that it was a "traumatic poem of violence with imagery as ambivalent as Goya's."

Time also liked Holden's performance, describing it as his best since Stalag 17 (a 1953 film that earned Holden an Oscar), noting Robert Ryan gave "the screen performance of his career", and concluding that "The Wild Bunch contains faults and mistakes" (such as flashbacks "introduced with surprising clumsiness"), but "its accomplishments are more than sufficient to confirm that Peckinpah, along with Stanley Kubrick and Arthur Penn, belongs with the best of the newer generation of American filmmakers."

William Wolf for Cue magazine found no merit in the film and gave it a two sentence dismissal and Judith Crist of New York magazine was also negative about the film.

In a 2002 retrospective Roger Ebert, who "saw the original version at the world premiere in 1969, during the golden age of the junket, when Warner Bros. screened five of its new films in the Bahamas for 450 critics and reporters", said that, back then, he had publicly declared the film a masterpiece during the junket's press conference, prompted by comments from "a reporter from the Reader's Digest [who] got up to ask 'Why was this film ever made?'" He compared the film to Pulp Fiction: "praised and condemned with equal vehemence."

"What Citizen Kane was to movie lovers in 1941, The Wild Bunch was to cineastes in 1969," wrote film critic Michael Sragow, who added that Peckinpah had "produced an American movie that equals or surpasses the best of Kurosawa: the Gotterdammerung of Westerns".

On Rotten Tomatoes the film has a 91% rating with an average rating of 8.8/10 based on reviews from 66 critics with its consensus stating, "The Wild Bunch is Sam Peckinpah's shocking, violent ballad to an old world and a dying genre".

The Wild Bunch was cited as cinematographer Roger Deakins's favorite film, and film director Kathryn Bigelow named it as one of her five favorite films. In the 2012 BFI Sight & Sound poll for The Greatest Films of All Time, The Wild Bunch received 27 votes from critics and directors such as Michael Mann, Paul Schrader and Edgar Wright.

=== Accolades ===
Award	Category	Subject	Result
Academy Awards	Best Original Screenplay	Walon Green, Roy N. Sickner, Sam Peckinpah	Nominated
Academy Awards	Best Original Score	Jerry Fielding	Nominated
DGA Awards	Outstanding Directing – Feature Film	Sam Peckinpah	Nominated
Motion Picture Sound Editors	Best Sound Editing – Dialogue		Won
Motion Picture Sound Editors	Best Sound Editing – Feature Film		Won
National Society of Film Critics Awards	Best Cinematography	Lucien Ballard	Won

=== Legacy ===
Decades later, the American Film Institute placed the film in several of its "100 Years" lists:

- AFI's 100 Years...100 Movies (1998) – No. 80
- AFI's 100 Years...100 Thrills (2001) – No. 69
- AFI's 100 Years...100 Heroes & Villains (2003):
  - The Wild Bunch – Nominated Villains
- AFI's 100 Years...100 Movie Quotes (2005):
  - "If they move, kill 'em." – Nominated
- AFI's 100 Years of Film Scores (2005) – Nominated
- AFI's 100 Years...100 Movies (10th Anniversary Edition) (2007) – No. 79
- AFI's 10 Top 10 (2008) – No. 6 Western

In 1999, The Wild Bunch was selected for preservation by the Library of Congress in the United States National Film Registry as being "culturally, historically or aesthetically significant".

In 2008, the film was ranked #94 on Empire magazine's list of The 500 Greatest Movies of All Time. It was later ranked #254 (out of 301 films) on their revised list in 2014. In the 2012 BFI Sight & Sound poll of The Greatest Films of All Time, The Wild Bunch ranked 84th on the critics' poll and 75th on the directors' poll. In 2005, the Los Angeles Times included The Wild Bunch on their list of The 129 Best Films of All Time, compiled by film critic Peter Rainer.

In 2006, the script for the film was selected by the Writers Guild of America as one of the 101 best screenplays of all time. In 2016, The Wild Bunch was also ranked as the 63rd best-directed film of all time by the Directors Guild of America since its founding in 1936. In 2012, the Motion Picture Editors Guild listed The Wild Bunch as the 23rd best-edited film of all time based on a survey of its membership.

In 1999, Entertainment Weekly ranked The Wild Bunch 57th on their list of the 100 greatest movies of all time. It was later ranked 83rd on their revised list in 2013. The National Society of Film Critics also included The Wild Bunch on their list of 100 Essential Films.

In 2016, Business Insider assembled a list of the 50 best movies of all time, according to film critics on the review aggregation website Metacritic. The Wild Bunch ranked #25. Time Out's Film Guide ranked the film #29 on their list of the 100 greatest movies as polled by their readers. Film critic and scholar Steven J. Schneider included the film in his book of 1001 Movies You Must See Before You Die.

In 2003, The New York Times ranked the film as one of The 1000 Best Movies Ever Made. In 2022, Variety magazine ranked the film #41 on their list of The 100 Greatest Movies of All Time.

FilmSite.org, a subsidiary of American Movie Classics, included the film on their list of the 100 greatest films. Additionally, Films101.com ranked The Wild Bunch as the 75th best of all time.

The poster for British virtual band Gorillaz's 2010 Escape to Plastic Beach Tour was an homage to The Wild Bunch's theatrical poster.

== Documentary ==
Sam Peckinpah and the making of The Wild Bunch were the subjects of the documentary The Wild Bunch: An Album in Montage (1996) directed and edited by Paul Seydor. The documentary was occasioned by the discovery of 72 minutes of silent, black-and-white film footage of Peckinpah and company on location in northern Mexico during the filming of The Wild Bunch. Michael Sragow wrote in 2000 that the documentary was "a wonderful introduction to Peckinpah's radically detailed historical film about American outlaws in revolutionary Mexico—a masterpiece that's part bullet-driven ballet, part requiem for Old West friendship and part existential explosion. Seydor's movie is also a poetic flight on the myriad possibilities of movie directing." Seydor and his co-producer Nick Redman were nominated in 1997 for the Academy Award for Best Documentary (Short Subject).

== Remake ==
In 2005, David Ayer was reported to be in final negotiations to direct and write a remake of The Wild Bunch. Jerry Weintraub would produce and Mark Vahradian would executive produce. The remake would be a modern reinterpretation of the original, involving heists, drug cartels and the CIA.

On January 19, 2011, it was announced by Warner Bros. that a remake of The Wild Bunch was in the works. Screenwriter Brian Helgeland was hired to develop a new script. The 2012 suicide of Tony Scott, who was scheduled to direct, put the project in limbo.

On May 15, 2013, The Wrap reported that Will Smith was in talks to star in and produce the remake. The new version would involve drug cartels and follows a disgraced DEA agent who assembles a team to go after a Mexican drug lord and his fortune. No director has been chosen, and a new screenwriter is being sought.

In 2015, a Hollywood insider website announced that Jonathan Jakubowicz was set to write and direct a remake. "Our sources also tell us that the remake will update the story to a contemporary setting, revolving around the CIA, dangerous drug cartels, and a thrilling heist against the backdrop of the Southern California-Mexico border. Jakubowicz will be working from previous drafts submitted by David Ayer and Brian Helgeland."

In 2018, it was announced that Mel Gibson would co-write and direct a new version of The Wild Bunch.

== See also ==
- List of American films of 1969
- List of cult films
- Vigilante film
