= A Faithful Soldier of Pancho Villa =

1967 film directed by Emilio Fernández

- Film poster
- Directed by: Emilio Fernández
- Written by: Emilio Fernández
- Produced by: Antonio del Castillo; Emilio Fernández
- Starring: Emilio Fernández
- Cinematography: José Ortiz Ramos
- Release date: 22 June 1967
- Running time: 95 minutes
- Country: Mexico
- Language: Spanish

A Faithful Soldier of Pancho Villa (Spanish: Un dorado de Pancho Villa) is a 1967 Mexican drama film written, directed by and starring Emilio Fernández. It was entered into the 5th Moscow International Film Festival.

== Cast ==
- Emilio Fernández as Aurelio Pérez
- Maricruz Olivier as Amalia Espinosa
- Carlos López Moctezuma as Gonzalo de los Monteros
- Sonia Amelio as María Dolores
- José Eduardo Pérez as Comandante Pérez
- José Trinidad Villa
- Jorge Pérez Hernández
- Aurora Cortés
- Celia Viveros
- Margarita Cortés
- Leonor Gómez
- Margarito Luna
- Salvador Godínez
