= The Wild Bunch: An Album in Montage =

1996 film

- Directed by: Paul Seydor
- Produced by: Nick Redman; Paul Seydor
- Narrated by: Nick Redman
- Edited by: Paul Seydor
- Production company: Tyrus Entertainment
- Distributed by: Warner Bros.
- Release date: November 1996
- Running time: 34 minutes
- Country: United States
- Language: English

The Wild Bunch: An Album in Montage is a 1996 American short documentary film directed and edited by Paul Seydor. The occasion for the creation of this documentary was the discovery of 72 minutes of silent black-and-white 16 mm film footage of Sam Peckinpah and company on location in northern Mexico during the filming of The Wild Bunch.

== Cast ==
- Walon Green as himself (voice)
- Newell Alexander as Cliff Coleman, William Holden (voice)
- Edmond O'Brien as himself (voice)
- James R. Silke as Friend / colleague (voice) (as Jim Silke)
- Mitch Carter as Gordon Dawson, Strother Martin (voice)
- Jerry Fielding as himself (voice)
- Sharon Peckinpah as herself (voice)
- L. Q. Jones as himself (voice)
- Ernest Borgnine as himself (voice)
- Peter Rainer as Bud Hulburd (voice)
- Ed Harris as Sam Peckinpah (voice)

== Reception ==
Michael Sragow wrote that the film is "a wonderful introduction to Peckinpah’s radically detailed historical film about American outlaws in revolutionary Mexico — a masterpiece that’s part bullet-driven ballet, part requiem for Old West friendship and part existential explosion. Seydor’s movie is also a poetic flight on the myriad possibilities of movie directing." Seydor and Redman were nominated for the Academy Award for Best Documentary (Short Subject).

== Home media ==
The documentary was included on the 2006 and 2007 DVD and Blu-ray releases of The Wild Bunch.
