= Íñigo de Martino =

Mexican screenwriter and film director (1905–2006)

- Born: 5 January 1905; Mexico City, Mexico
- Died: 3 September 2006 (aged 101); Los Angeles, California; United States
- Occupations: Writer, Director
- Years active: 1936–1959 (film)

Íñigo de Martino (5 January 1905 – 3 September 2006) was a Mexican screenwriter and film director.

== Selected filmography ==
- Juan Pistolas (1936)
- Enamorada (1946)
- The Genius (1948)
- The Torch (1950)
- Love for Love (1950)
- Doña Perfecta (1951)
- Acapulco (1952)
- When the Fog Lifts (1952)
- The White Rose (1954)
- The Rapture (1954)

== Bibliography ==
- Van Wagenen, Michael. Remembering the Forgotten War: The Enduring Legacies of the U.S./Mexican War. Univ of Massachusetts Press, 2012.
