= Sonia Amelio =

Mexican musician and dancer

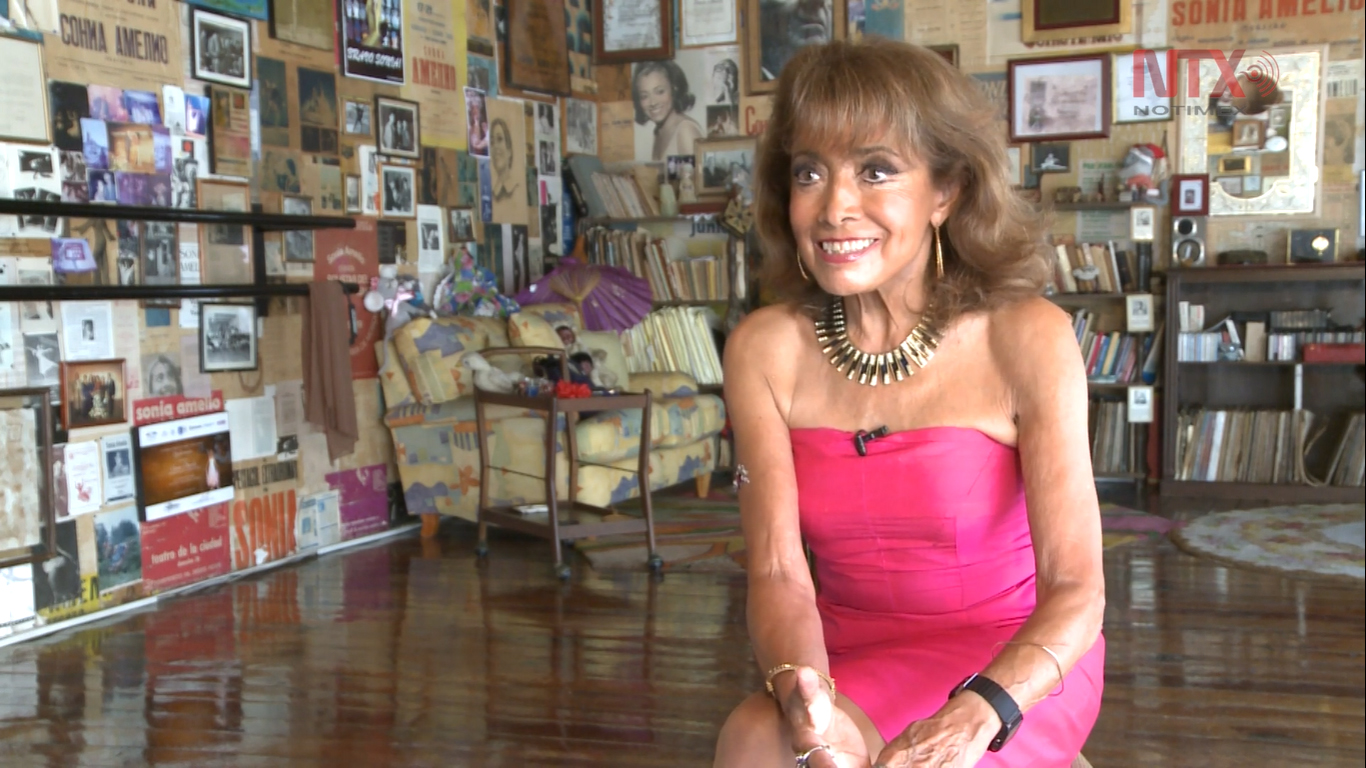
Sonia Amelio in 2019.

Sonia Amelio (born Mexico City, Mexico, 1941) is a Mexican dancer, musician, choreographer, and actress. She is a castanet player.

Amelio was on stage as a pianist and ballerina from age six. She was trained in dance, both classical ballet and traditional Spanish and Latin American styles. For the latter, she often utilized castanets. Amelio has developed castanet arrangements to accompany works of such composers as Chopin and Liszt, and has performed them as a guest artist with orchestras in several countries, including the city symphonies of Novosibirsk, Russia and Reutlingen, Germany. She has also developed dance routines to accompany the works of romantic era composers such as Beethoven and Paganini.

Amelio appeared in films and television programs in her native Mexico during the 1960s and 1970s. Her one appearance in a Hollywood film was a small part in director Sam Peckinpah’s The Wild Bunch (1969). She portrays a young Mexican woman named Teresa who is shot to death by a lover from her pueblo in a public square after scorning him for a warlord General Mapache.

She has conducted seminars and master classes on dance and choreography outside Mexico. Her institutional affiliations have included the Choreographic Institute of Beijing and the Ana Pavlova Institute in Moscow.

== Partial filmography ==
- Los tres calaveras (1965) - Herself
- A Faithful Soldier of Pancho Villa (1967) - María Dolores
- The Wild Bunch (1969) - Teresa
- El crepúsculo de un dios (1969) - Angela Baretti / Sonia Amelio
- Remolino de pasiones (1970) - Dancer
- The Fearmaker (1971) - Linda
- Tacos al carbón (1972) - Leonor
- Mi niño Tizoc (1972) - Raquel, enfermera
- Me caí de la nube (1974) - Emma
- Los 7 pecados capitales (1975)
- Los tres compadres (1975)
- Nobleza ranchera (1977)
- De Cocula es el mariachi (1978) - (final film role)
