= The Torch (film) =

1950 Mexican/American film directed by Emilio Fernández

- Directed by: Emilio Fernández
- Written by: Emilio Fernández (original screenplay); Íñigo de Martino (original screenplay); Bert Granet (adaptation)
- Produced by: Paulette Goddard (associate producer); Bert Granet (producer)
- Starring: Paulette Goddard, Pedro Armendáriz
- Cinematography: Gabriel Figueroa
- Edited by: Charles L. Kimball
- Music by: Antonio Díaz Conde
- Production company: Bert Granet Productions
- Distributed by: Eagle-Lion Films
- Release date: June 8, 1950 (Los Angeles)
- Running time: 83 minutes
- Countries: Mexico; United States
- Languages: Spanish; English

The Torch (Spanish: Del odio nace el amor, meaning "Love is born from hate"), also known as Bandit General in the United Kingdom, is a 1950 Mexican/American film, written and directed by Emilio Fernández, and starring Paulette Goddard and Pedro Armendáriz. It is a remake of the film Enamorada (1946), also written and directed by Fernandez, and starring Armendáriz. This film marked the film debut of the actress Rosa María Vázquez.

The original script is based on William Shakespeare's The Taming of the Shrew.

== Plot ==
In the Mexican city of Cholula, the wedding of María Dolores Peñafiel, daughter of the successful glass manufacturer Don Carlos Peñafiel, to the American doctor Dr. Robert Stanley is prepared. When the rebel leader José Juan Reyes and his troops take Cholula, the wedding seems to be in danger. The area's wealthy families visit the Peñafiel estate. The priest Father Sierra is also there and reassures María Dolores that Reyes is his old school friend.

Reyes imprisons many residents and executes some of them. Don Carlos, Father Sierra and a few others visit Reyes, who warmly greets the priest but demands money and supplies from the wealthy residents. In Reyes' eyes, the merchant Fidel Bernal is particularly responsible because Bernal had reaped a fortune from the revolution. After a while, Bernal agrees, and he offers Reyes his wife, which angers Reyes so much that he has Bernal shot. Dr. Stanley asks to travel to Mexico City to buy medicine and return María Dolores' wedding dress. Reyes agrees and lets the doctor ride away.

Father Sierra assures Reyes that he has not taken any money from the rich. He learns that Reyes takes special care of the girl Adelita, whose parents died fighting on the rebels' side. When Reyes harasses María Dolores on the street, she knocks him unconscious. Reyes, impressed, becomes smitten with María Dolores and asks Father Sierra for advice. Meanwhile, Don Carlos is to be executed on the orders of Reyes' deputy, Capitán Bocanegra. Reyes arranges for Don Carlos to be released in time. Later, María Dolores is dismissive but Reyes continues to court her.

When Reyes reproaches Maria that her rich family is keeping her from following him and the revolution, she slaps him in the face, and he strikes back. Father Sierra intervenes and is also beaten, but he agrees with Reyes' views. A wave of influenza hits the city and many of the residents, including little Adelita, fall ill. The rebel troops want to escape the disease, but Reyes forbids everyone from leaving the city. Don Carlos and his daughter also want to leave. Reyes leaves the decision to them, and when they see the suffering of the sick, the Peñafiels stay and help.

Dr. Stanley returns, and although he couldn't carry any medicine with him, he advises treating the sick with quinine and compresses to reduce fever. Reyes asks María Dolores for forgiveness for his behavior, and she, having become attracted to him, forgives him. To everyone's shock, little Adelita dies of the flu. Reyes and Father Sierra learn that government troops are approaching the city and are supposed to destroy the rebels. Reyes wants to leave Cholula with his people to protect the residents. During the wedding ceremony at the Peñafiels' house, the rebels ride by, and María Dolores runs to join Reyes.

== Cast ==
- Paulette Goddard as María Dolores Penafiel
- Pedro Armendáriz as José Juan Reyes
- Gilbert Roland as Father Sierra
- Walter Reed as Robert Stanley
- Julio Villarreal as Don Carlos Penafiel
- Carlos Múzquiz as Fidel Bernal
- Margarito Luna as Capt. Bocanegra
- José Torvay as Capt. Quiñones
- Pascual García Peña as Don Apolinio
- Antonia Daneem as Adeli
- Jorge Treviño
- Rosaura Revueltas
- Eduardo Arozamena
- Guillermo Calles
- Rosa María Vázquez as Adelita

== Production ==
The film was shot from early September to mid-October 1949 in Estudios Churubusco in Mexico City.

Emilio Fernández had directed the 1946 film Enamorada, starring Pedro Armendáriz and María Félix. Paulette Goddard became interested in remaking the film and coproduced The Torch with herself in Félix's role. Fernández, Armendáriz and cinematographer Gabriel Figueroa traveled to Cholula in southern Mexico in mid-1949 to film scenes with Goddard. Scenes featuring Armendáriz and his troops were reused from the original film.

== Release ==
The film's world premiere was held at the Orpheum Theatre in Los Angeles on June 8, 1950, with Mexico's consul general in attendance.

== Reception ==
In a contemporary review for The New York Times, critic Thomas M. Pryor wrote: "Miss Goddard's ... tantrums lack spontaneity and lively animal vigor. Her whole manner is cheap and coarse and throws the character of a lady of breeding completely off-key. ... [T]he accent is on romance in 'The Torch' and on that level it is quite boring. More action would have helped because the film does pick up when the horses are galloping and the sound of cannon shakes the screen."

Reviewer Philip K. Scheuer of the Los Angeles Times wrote: "It is rather painfully clear to me ... that Miss Goddard has made the role hers in name only. Hoyden, spitfire, terrible temper and all, she plays it in the manner of a Swanson or a Pickford of a generation ago. And while I have no objection to the pantomimic, big close-up style as such, I would prefer to see it as practiced by Swanson or Pickford, who knew how, instead of by Goddard, who doesn't—quite. Furthermore, Miss G. isn't Mexican, which is bound to make a difference in an almost all-Mexican setup."

== Comic-book adaption ==
- Eastern Color Movie Love #4 (August 1950)
