= Roy N. Sickner =

American actor, screenwriter and stuntman (1928–2001)

- Born: September 30, 1928; Arizona, U.S.
- Died: February 15, 2001 (aged 72)
- Occupations: Actor, screenwriter, stuntman

Roy N. Sickner (September 30, 1928 – February 15, 2001) was an American actor, screenwriter and stuntman.

== Life and career ==
Sickner was born in Arizona. He began his career in 1956, appearing in the film Over-Exposed, starring Cleo Moore, Richard Crenna and Isobel Elsom.

Sickner stunt doubled for actors, Dub Taylor, Richard Harris, Yul Brynner, Rod Taylor and Marlon Brando.

Sickner appeared in numerous television programs including Mission: Impossible, Voyage to the Bottom of the Sea, The Twilight Zone, The Man from U.N.C.L.E., and The Wild Wild West. He also appeared in numerous films including McLintock!, Planet of the Apes, Major Dundee, The Great Escape, Wild Wild Winter, Morituri and Nevada Smith.

In 1969, Sickner was nominated for an Academy Award in the category Best Original Screenplay for the film The Wild Bunch. His nomination was shared with Walon Green and Sam Peckinpah.

Sickner died on February 15, 2001, (Note: Sickner's death is written as Feb 15, 2001 as in February 15, 2001) at the age of 72.
