= The White Rose (1954 film) =

1954 film

- Directed by: Emilio Fernández; Íñigo de Martino
- Written by: Mauricio Magdaleno Íñigo de Martino; Emilio Fernández
- Starring: Roberto Cañedo; Gina Cabrera; Julio Capote
- Cinematography: Gabriel Figueroa
- Edited by: Jorge Bustos
- Music by: Antonio Díaz Conde
- Production company: Películas Antillas
- Release date: 11 August 1954
- Running time: 106 minutes
- Countries: Cuba; Mexico
- Language: Spanish

The White Rose (Spanish: La rosa blanca) is a 1954 Cuban-Mexican drama film directed by Emilio Fernández and Íñigo de Martino, and starring Roberto Cañedo, Gina Cabrera and Julio Capote. It was shot at the Churubusco Studios in Mexico City. It portrays the life of the nineteenth-century Cuban poet José Martí, a leading advocate of the country's independence from Spain.

== Cast ==
- Roberto Cañedo as José Julián Martí Pérez
- Gina Cabrera as Carmen Zayas Bazán
- Julio Capote as José Julián Martí Pérez joven
- Julio Villarreal as Mariano Martí
- Dalia Íñiguez as Leonor Pérez
- Andrés Soler as Miguel García Granados
- Raquel Revuelta as Carmen Miyares de Mantilla
- Rebeca Iturbide as Rosario de la Peña
- Arturo Soto Rangel as José María Izaguirre
- Rafael Alcayde as Francisco Zayas Bazán
- Miguel Inclán as Manuel Altamirano
- Manuel Arvide as Manuel Mantilla
- Juan José Martínez Casado as Rafael María de Mendive
- Raúl Díaz as Coronel Jiménez de Sandoval
- Antonio Bravo as Español Republicano
- Manuel Noriega as Médico de Nueva York

== See also ==
- List of Cuban films

== Bibliography ==
- Carl J. Mora. Mexican Cinema: Reflections of a Society, 1896-2004. McFarland, 2005.
