= Gina Cabrera =

Cuban actress (1928–2022)

- Born: 28 May 1928; Havana, Cuba
- Died: 3 January 2022 (aged 93); Havana, Cuba
- Occupation: actress

Luisa Georgina Cabrera Parada (28 May 1928 – 3 January 2022), better known as Gina Cabrera, was a Cuban film, television, stage and voice actress.

== Career ==
Cabrera began her career as a child actress at 8 years old, working on radio dramas and on stage with the Roberto Rodríguez' Compañía Infantil (Children's Company). She made her film debut in 1945, in François Betancourt's Sed de amor, and in the 1950s she appeared in a number of popular Cuban and Mexican films, notably the controversial The White Rose directed by Emilio Fernández. She was a top star of Cuban state television from its foundation until the 1990s. In 1961 she headed the CMQ television and radio department of the Cuban literacy campaign. In 2003 she was awarded a lifetime Premio Nacional de Televisión for her career.

Her final years were difficult, with Cabrera infirm, largely forgotten by the public and receiving poor "food aid" from the state. She died on 3 January 2022, at the age of 93.
