= Nobleza ranchera =

1977 Mexican film

- Starring: Sara García, Juan Gabriel, Veronica Castro, Sonia Amelio, Eleazar García "Chelelo"
- Release date: 1975
- Running time: 86 minute
- Country: Mexico
- Language: Spanish

Nobleza ranchera ("Rural Chivalry") is a 1975 Mexican film starring Sara García, Juan Gabriel, Veronica Castro, Sonia Amelio and Eleazar García "Chelelo"
