= Enamorada (film) =

1946 film

- Theatrical release date
- Directed by: Emilio Fernández
- Written by: Emilio Fernández; Iñigo de Martino
- Produced by: Benito Alazraki
- Starring: María Félix; Pedro Armendáriz
- Cinematography: Gabriel Figueroa
- Edited by: Gloria Schoemann
- Music by: Eduardo Hernández Moncada
- Distributed by: Panamerican Films
- Release date: December 25, 1946
- Running time: 99 minutes
- Country: Mexico
- Language: Spanish

Enamorada ("Enamoured") is a 1946 Mexican melodrama film, written and directed by Emilio Fernández and starring María Félix and Pedro Armendáriz. It was shot at the Churubusco Studios in Mexico City and on location in Puebla. The sets were designed by the art director Manuel Fontanals.

This film was remade in 1950 as The Torch with Armendáriz repeating his role alongside Paulette Goddard who was credited as an associate producer on the film.

== Plot ==
The revolutionary José Juan Reyes takes the town of Cholula, Puebla and demands contributions from its wealthiest citizens for the Mexican Revolution. However, his plans are disrupted when he falls in love with the Señorita Beatriz Peñafiel, the tempestuous daughter of the town's richest man.

== Cast ==
- María Félix as Beatriz Peñafiel
- Pedro Armendáriz as Gen. José Juan Reyes
- Fernando Fernández as Padre Rafael Sierra
- José Morcillo as Carlos Peñafiel
- Eduardo Arozamena as Alcalde Joaquín Gómez
- Miguel Inclán as Capt. Bocanegra
- Manuel Dondé as Fidel Bernal
- Eugenio Rossi as Eduardo Roberts
- Norma Hill as Rosa de Bernal
- Juan García as Capt. Quiñones
- José Torvay as Maestro Apolonio Sánchez
- Pascual García Peña as Merolico

== Notes ==
The film was entered into the 1947 Cannes Film Festival. The film was inspired by William Shakespeare's The Taming of the Shrew. The final scene was inspired by the final scene in Josef von Sternberg's 1930 film Morocco.

This was the first María Félix and Emilio Fernández film collaboration. The others were Rio Escondido, Maclovia, Reportaje and El Rapto.

== Restoration ==
A restoration of the film by the UCLA Film & Television Archive and the World Cinema Project was screened at the 71st edition of the Cannes Film Festival under the Cannes Classics section in May 2018.
