= Emilio Fernández =

Mexican film director and actor (1904–1986)

- Fernández in the film The Soldiers of Pancho Villa (1959)
- Born: Emilio Fernández Romo; 26 March 1904; Sabinas, Coahuila, Mexico
- Died: 6 August 1986 (aged 82); Mexico City, Mexico
- Other name: "El Indio"
- Education: Heroic Military Academy
- Years active: 1928–1986
- Spouse(s): Gladys Fernández; Columba Domínguez
- Relatives: Jaime Fernández (cousin)

Emilio Fernández Romo (Spanish: [eˈmiljo feɾˈnandes ˈromo]; 26 March 1904 – 6 August 1986), nicknamed "El Indio" (lit. "The Indian"), was a Mexican film director, screenwriter, and actor. He was one of the most prolific and acclaimed film directors of the Golden Age of Mexican cinema in the 1940s and '50s. His film María Candelaria (1944) won the Palme d'Or at the 1946 Cannes Film Festival, the first Mexican film to receive the honor. As an actor, he worked in numerous film productions in both Mexico and in Hollywood.

== Early life ==
Born in Sabinas, Coahuila, on 26 March 1904, Emilio Fernández Romo was the son of a revolutionary general, while his mother was a descendant of Kickapoo natives. From his parents, he inherited Mexican customs and indigenous beliefs. When he was a teenager, a fatal event forced him to flee his home and enlist in the ranks of the Mexican Revolution. Later, he entered the Mexican Military Academy (where in 1954, he gained the rank of colonel). In 1923, he took part in the uprising of Adolfo de la Huerta against the government of Álvaro Obregón, but this insurrection failed and he was sent to prison. He escaped and left Mexico to go into exile, first in Texas, then in Chicago, and later in Los Angeles. There he earned his living as a laundry employee, bartender, longshoreman, press assistant and finally as a stonemason for Hollywood studio construction, a circumstance that favored his foray into film as an extra and as a double for stars like Douglas Fairbanks.

== Career ==
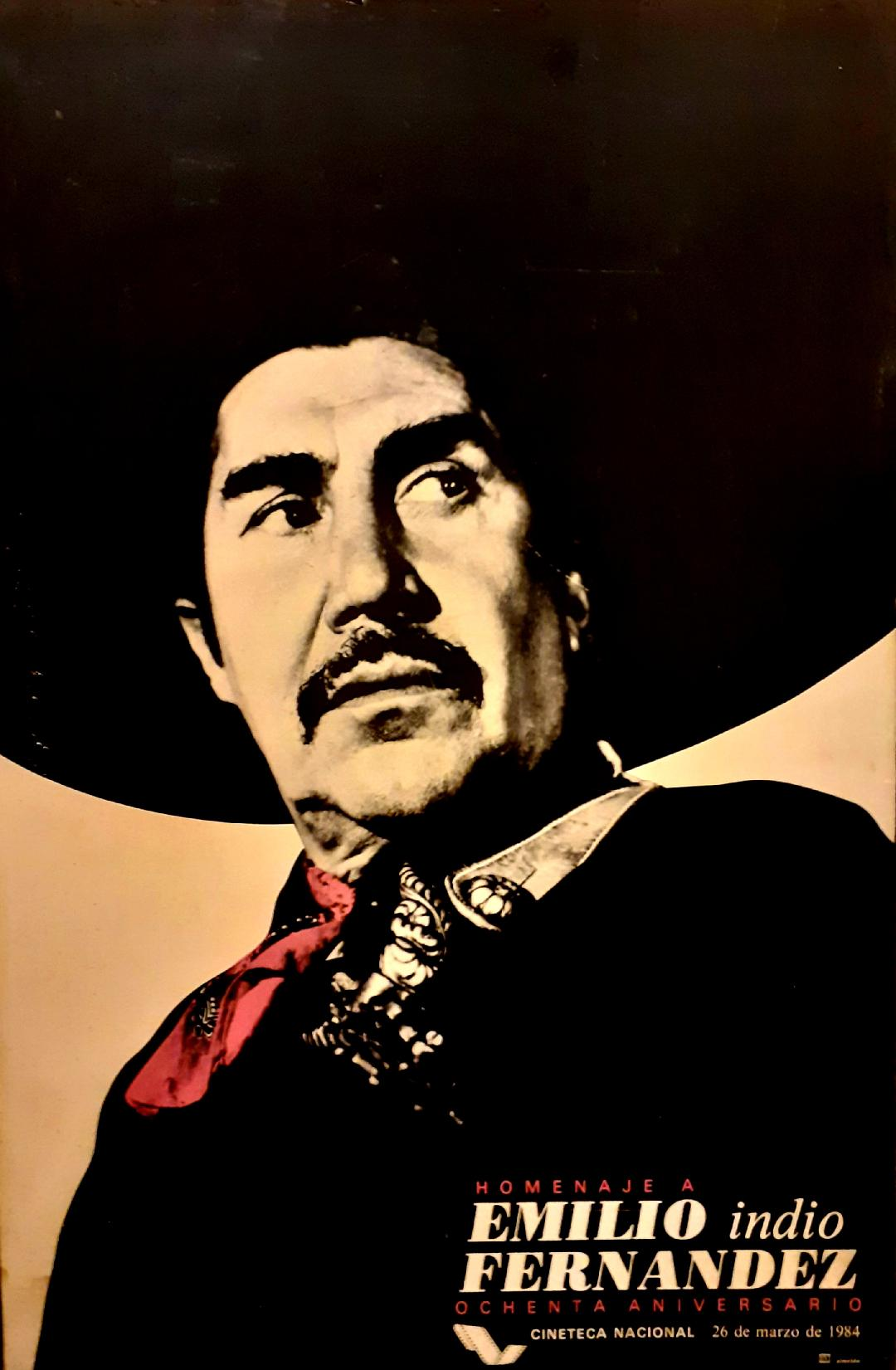
Tribute poster at the Cineteca Nacional de México to Emilio "Indio" (Indian) Fernández for his 80 years, 1984.

His initial career was encouraged by De la Huerta, who told him: Mexico does not want nor need more revolutions Emilio. You are in the Mecca of film, and film is the most effective tool we humans have invented to express ourselves. Learn to make movies and you return to our homeland with that knowledge. Make our films so you can express your ideas, so they reach thousands of people. In 1930, he had an experience that significantly marked his career as a creator: his stay in the United States coincided with the arrival in the country of Sergei Eisenstein (Soviet film director). He went to private screenings of Eisenstein's films, which impressed him, revealing a style that was different from that used in Hollywood aesthetics. Three years later, after seeing fragments of Que viva Mexico!, an Eisenstein film project made in that country, which was to remain incomplete, his desire to make films consolidated.

He returned to Mexico in 1933, thanks to an amnesty granted by the government, with the decision to continue his film career, but during the first year he made a living as a boxer, a diver in Acapulco, a baker and an aviator. In 1934, he appeared as a bandolero (robber) in the film Cruz Diablo, directed by Fernando de Fuentes. His looks also landed him a starring role playing a native in Janitzio by Carlos Navarro.

Fernández continued to perform melodramas and folklore films. In 1941, with the financial support of General Juan Francisco Azcárate and the encouragement of his friend, the actor David Silva (then a law student), he filmed La isla de la pasión (a.k.a. Passion Island) with which he made his directorial debut.

In 1943 he was contacted by the Mexican film Studios Films Mundiales. Emilio Fernández (director), Mauricio Magdaleno (writer), Gabriel Figueroa (photographer), Dolores del Río and Pedro Armendáriz (actors) formed the team that would go on to make Flor silvestre, the film that debuted Dolores del Río in the Mexican cinema. Then, Fernández filmed María Candelaria (1944), for which he was awarded the Palm d'Or at Cannes along with Gabriel Figueroa.

In 1945, based on the history of American writer John Steinbeck (who adapted the screenplay in collaboration with him), Fernández filmed La Perla (a.k.a. The Pearl), an allegory about the limits of wickedness of man in his greed and desire for power. It won the award for Best Cinematography, and a mention for Best Film contribution to progress in the Venice Film Festival (1947). It also received the Silver Ariel (1948) for Best Picture, Directing, Male Performance and Photography; the award of the Hollywood Foreign Press Association (1949), and the award for Best Cinematography at the Festival of Madrid (1949).

He directed three films with María Félix: Enamorada (1946), Río Escondido (1948, winner of Best Cinematography in the Karlovy Vary in Czechoslovakia) and Maclovia (1948). His then wife Columba Domínguez starred in Pueblerina (1948). Fernández worked as co-producer on The Fugitive (1947), a Hollywood film made in Mexico by director John Ford, which also featured del Río and Armendáriz and was shot by Figueroa. In 1949, Salon Mexico won the award for Best Cinematography at the festival in Brussels, Belgium. He followed these in 1950 with urban films, Víctimas del Pecado, starring Ninón Sevilla, and Cuando levanta la niebla, with Columba Domínguez and Arturo de Córdova. In 1950, he made his only film in Hollywood The Torch, a remake of Enamorada starring Paulette Goddard.

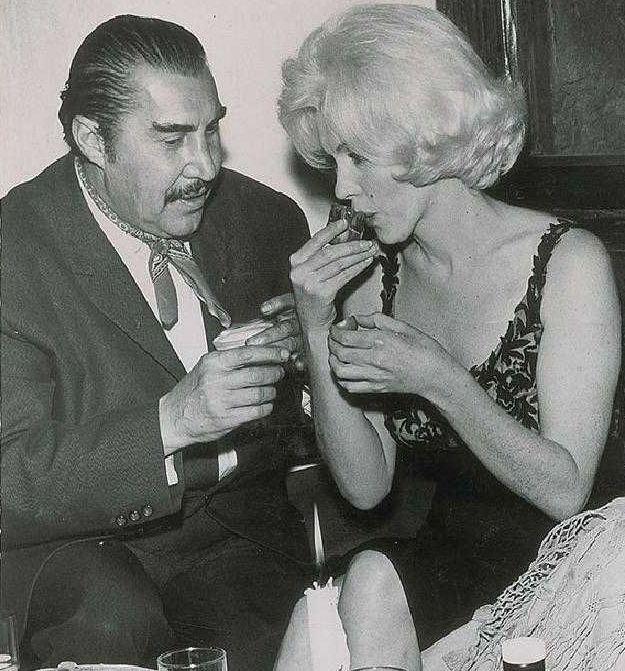
Fernández with Marilyn Monroe in 1962

Around the mid-1950s, Fernández returned to his role as actor. Although he did little directing in the 1960s, he had several roles as an actor, appearing in: The Soldiers of Pancho Villa (1959), La bandida (1962); The Night of the Iguana (1964, directed by John Huston, where he shared credits with Richard Burton and Ava Gardner); Return of the Seven (1966); The Appaloosa (1966, with Marlon Brando), among many others. His 1967 film A Faithful Soldier of Pancho Villa was entered into the 5th Moscow International Film Festival. He also acted in three films directed by Sam Peckinpah: The Wild Bunch (1969), Pat Garrett and Billy the Kid (1973), and Bring Me the Head of Alfredo Garcia (1974).

== Later life ==
During the last years of his life, he did not direct, although he continued to act. In the late 1970s he was imprisoned in Torreón after he was found guilty of the death of a farmer. He was released after 6 months probation. Missing weekly sign-ins, due to an accident, caused him to be imprisoned again. After finishing his prison sentence, he returned to his house in Coyoacan.

== Personal life ==
Gladys Fernández, a 16-year-old Cuban girl, became his first wife in 1941. Their relationship was affected by Emilio's passion for Hollywood diva Dolores del Río and Gladys ended up leaving him. Emilio and Gladys had a daughter, the writer Adela Fernández y Fernández.

His most stable relationship was with the actress Columba Domínguez. They were together for seven years, but the relationship collapsed because Columba became pregnant, and he did not want more children. She decided to have the baby without his consent, they broke up. Their daughter, Jacaranda, died in 1978 after falling from the top of a building.

His marriage to Gloria De Valois Cabiedes produced another daughter, Xochitl Fernández De Valois.

Actor Jaime Fernández was his cousin.

Fernández was infatuated with the British-American actress Olivia de Havilland, whom he never met. Fernández asked the then-president of Mexico, Miguel Alemán, to extend a street in Coyoacán to his mansion, and to name it Dulce Olivia, 'Sweet Olivia'. Thus, he would always have her symbolically near, transformed into a street, and always at his feet.

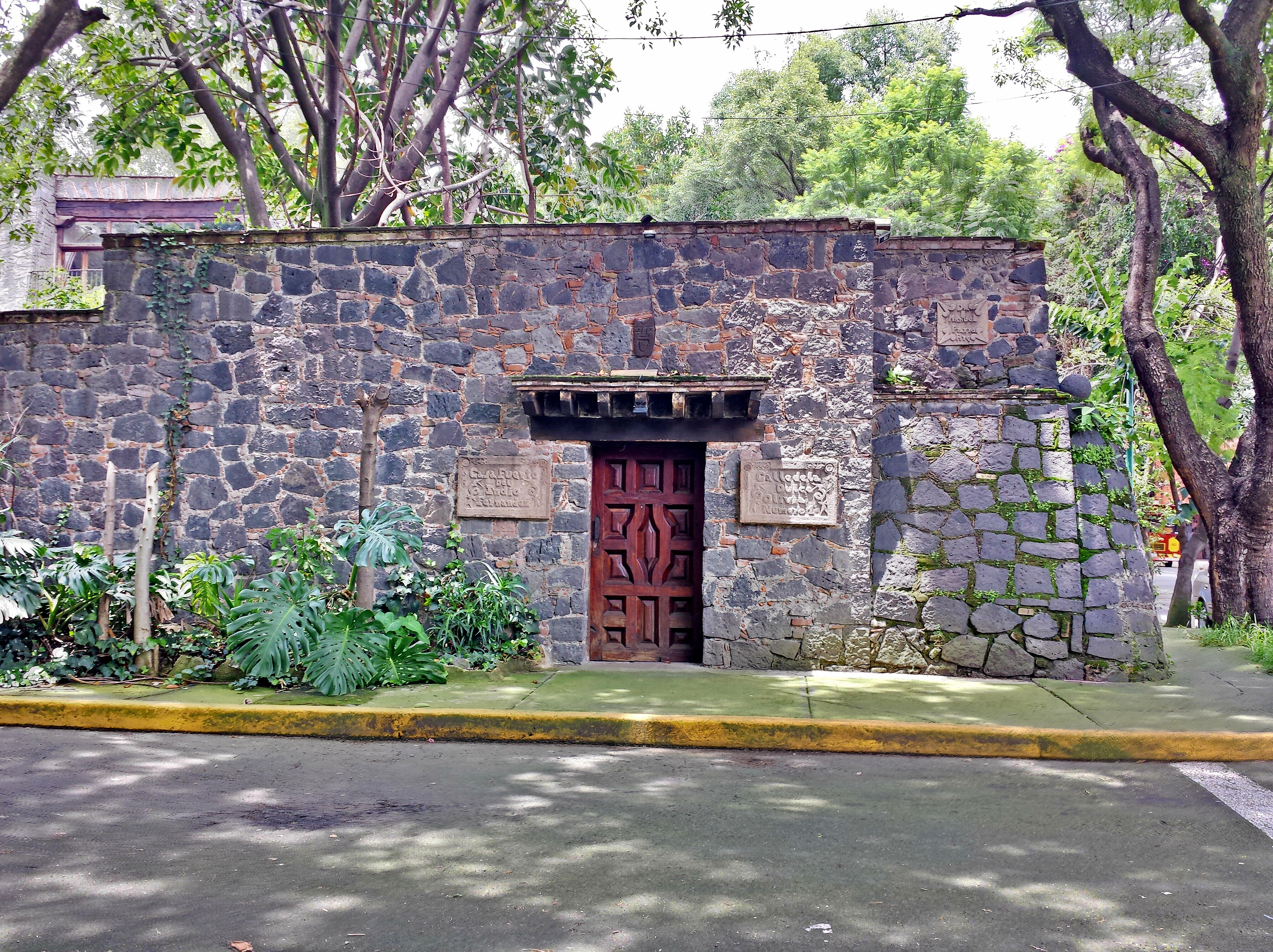
The door of his house at Calle de la Dulce Olivia, 1, Coyoacán.

=== Death ===
In early 1986, Emilio Fernández suffered a fall at his home in Acapulco, which caused a fracture of the femur. According to his daughter Adela, in the hospital he received a blood transfusion that was infected with malaria. Emilio Fernández died on 6 August 1986.

After the death of Fernández, a lawsuit broke out between his daughter Adela and Columba Domínguez. Adela had been named sole heir of her father and took possession of his house, a fortress in the neighborhood of Coyoacán in Mexico City, which Columba claimed as her own. According to Columba, Adela was not a biological daughter of Fernández, but was adopted by him when she was abandoned by her mother. Adela's death in 2013 left the legal situation unclear.

== Legacy ==
His film legacy has been awarded with the Ariel Award, the Colón de Oro in Huelva, Spain, and with a chair in his name at the Moscow Film School. With photographer Gabriel Figueroa, writer Mauricio Magdaleno, and actors Pedro Armendáriz, Dolores del Río, María Félix and Columba Dominguez, Romo conducted various productions that promoted both national customs and the values associated with the Mexican Revolution.

Fernández directed 43 films between 1942 and 1979. Starting with Cielito Lindo (1936), he was recognized as a screenwriter on 40 films. He also worked as a second unit director on American films made in Mexico, including The Magnificent Seven (1960), when he was sent to the American crew by the Mexican film industry to guarantee that images of Mexicans were neither racist nor insulting. In 2002, La Perla (a.k.a. The Pearl) was added to the National Film Registry of the United States Library of Congress by the National Film Preservation Board as being "culturally, historically, or aesthetically significant".

On the 100th anniversary of El Indio's birth, Emilio Fernández and his colleague Gabriel Figueroa were recognized during the inaugural Puerto Vallarta Film Festival of the Americas, held in Puerto Vallarta, Mexico in November 2004.

He was portrayed by Joaquín Cosio in the Mexican biographical film Cantinflas.

Fernández is rumored to be the model for the Oscar statuette, but this is not confirmed. The legend suggested that MGM art director Cedric Gibbons, one of the original Motion Picture Academy members tasked with creating the Academy Award trophy, was introduced to Fernández by actress Dolores del Río and persuaded him to pose nude.

The House-Fortress of Fernández, managed by his daughter Adela until her death in 2013, became a space dedicated to various cultural activities in Mexico City, and has served as a backdrop for filming over one hundred Mexican and foreign films.

== Filmography ==
=== As director ===
Year	Original title	English title	Production country	Language	Cast	Award nominations (Wins in bold)
1941	La isla de la pasión	The Island of the Passion	México	Spanish	Pedro Armendáriz, Isabela Corona	
1942	Soy puro mexicano	I'm a Real Mexican	Mexico	Spanish	Pedro Armendáriz, Andres Soler	
1942	Flor Silvestre	Wild Flower	México	Spanish	Dolores del Río, Pedro Armendáriz	
1943	María Candelaria (aka Xochimilco)	Portrait of Maria	Mexico	Spanish	Dolores del Río, Pedro Armendáriz	**Cannes Film Festival – Palm d'Or**
1944	Las Abandonadas	The Abandoned	Mexico	Spanish	Dolores del Río, Pedro Armendáriz	**Ariel Award** – Best Actress
1944	Bugambilia	Bugambilia	Mexico	Spanish	Dolores del Río, Pedro Armendáriz	
1945	La Perla	The Pearl	Mexico	Spanish	Pedro Armendáriz, María Elena Marqués	**Venice Film Festival – Golden Lion**; **Ariel Awards – Golden Ariel, Best Actor, Best Supporting Actor, Cinematography**; **Golden Globe – Best Cinematography**
1946	Pepita Jiménez		Mexico	Spanish	Ricardo Montalbán, Rosita Dáz Gimeno	
1946	Enamorada	In Love	Mexico	Spanish	María Félix, Pedro Armendáriz	**Ariel Award** – Best Actress
1947	The Fugitive (producer)	The Fugitive	United States	English	Henry Fonda, Dolores del Río	
1947	Río Escondido	Hidden River	Mexico	Spanish	María Félix, Carlos López Moctezuma	**Karlovy Vary International Film Festival – Best Photography**
1948	Maclovia	Maclovia (aka Damn Beauty)	Mexico	Spanish	María Félix, Pedro Armendáriz	
1948	Pueblerina	Small Town Girl	Mexico	Spanish	Columba Dominguez, Roberto Cañedo	**Cannes Film Festival – Official Selection**; **Karlovy Vary International Film Festival – Best Photography**
1949	La Malquerida	A Woman without Love	Mexico	Spanish	Dolores del Río, Pedro Armendáriz	
1950	Salón México	Mexico Lounge	Mexico	Spanish	Marga López, Miguel Inclan	**Brussels Film Festival – Best Photography**
1950	Duelo en las montañas	Duel in the Mountains	Mexico	Spanish	Rita Macedo, Roberto Cañedo	
1950	The Torch		United States	English	Paulette Goddard, Pedro Armendáriz	
1950	Un día de vida	One Day of Life	Mexico	Spanish	Columba Domínguez, Roberto Cañedo	
1951	Vìctimas del Pecado	Victims of the Sin	Mexico	Spanish	Ninón Sevilla, Rodolfo Acosta	
1951		Maria Islands	Mexico	Spanish	Pedro Infante, Jaime Fernández	
1951	La bienamada	The Beloved	Mexico	Spanish	Columba Domínguez, Roberto Cañedo	
1952	Siempre tuya	Forever Yours	Mexico	Spanish	Jorge Negrete, Gloria Marín	
1952	Acapulco		Mexico	Spanish	Elsa Aguirre, Miguel Torruco	
1952	Cuando levanta la niebla	When the Fog Lifts	Mexico	Spanish	Columba Domínguez, Arturo de Córdova	
1953	La Red (aka Rossana)	The Red	Mexico	Spanish	Rossana Podestà, Armando Silvestre	**Cannes Film Festival- Best Narration**
1953	Reportaje	Report News	Mexico	Spanish		
1953	El Rapto	The Rapture	Mexico	Spanish	María Félix, Jorge Negrete	
1954	La rosa blanca	The White Rose	Cuba/Mexico	Spanish	Jorge Mistral, Rebeca Iturbide	
1955	La Tierra del Fuego se apaga	Tierra del Fuego is off	Argentina	Spanish	Jorge Mistral, Bertha Moss	
1958	Una cita de amor	An appointment with love	Mexico	Spanish	Silvia Pinal, Jaime Fernández	**8th Berlin International Film Festival – Official Selection**
1962	Pueblito	Little Town	Mexico	Spanish	Columba Domínguez, Lilia Prado	**San Sebastián International Film Festival – Las perlas del Cantábrico**
1963	Paloma herída	Wounded Dove	Mexico/Guatemala	Spanish	Patricia Conde, Columba Domínguez	
1967	Un Dorado de Pancho Villa	A Faithful Soldier of Pancho Villa	Mexico	Spanish	Emilio Fernández, Maricruz Olivier	**5th Moscow International Film Festival – Official Selection**
1969	Un Crepúsculo de un dios	A Twilight of a God	Mexico	Spanish	Emilio Fernández, Guillermo Murray	
1974	La Choca	la Choca	Mexico	Spanish	Pilar Pellicer, Gregorio Casals	**Ariel Award – Best Direction, Best Supporting Actress, Best Photography, Best Edition**; **Karlovy Vary Film Festival – Best Direction**
1976	Zona Roja	Red Zone	Mexico	Spanish	Fanny Cano, Armando Silvestre	
1979	México Norte	Mexico North	Mexico	Spanish	Patricia Reyes Spíndola, Roberto Cañedo	
1979	Erótica	Erotic	Mexico	Spanish	Jorge Rivero, Rebecca Silva	

=== As actor ===
- 1928: El destino
- 1930: Oklahoma Cyclone – Pancho Gomez (uncredited)
- 1930: The Land of Missing Men – Lopez – aka Black Coyote
- 1930: Headin' North – Mexican Gambler (uncredited)
- 1931: Sunrise Trail – Pancho (uncredited)
- 1932: The Western Code – Indian Joe
- 1933: Laughing at Life – Revolutionary (uncredited)
- 1933: Flying Down to Rio – Dancer (uncredited)
- 1934: La buenaventura – Boris
- 1934: Corazón bandolero – Chacal
- 1934: Cruz Diablo – Toparca, bandolero
- 1935: Martín Garatuza
- 1935: Tribu – Itzul
- 1935: Janitzio – Zirahuén
- 1936: Celos – Sebastián
- 1936: María Elena – Bailarín de La Bamba
- 1936: Marihuana (El monstruo verde) – El Indio
- 1936: Allá en el Rancho Grande – Dancer
- 1937: El superloco – Idúa
- 1937: El impostor
- 1937: Las cuatro milpas
- 1937: Las mujeres mandan – Bailarín
- 1937: Almas rebeldes
- 1937: Adiós Nicanor – Nicanor
- 1939: Juan sin miedo – Valentin
- 1939: With Villa's Veterans – Mayor El Indio Fernández
- 1940: El fanfarrón: ¡Aquí llegó el valentón! – Aguilucho (Juan José)
- 1940: Los de Abajo – Pancracio
- 1940: El charro Negro – Emilio Gómez
- 1941: El Zorro de Jalisco – Ernesto
- 1941: Rancho Alegre
- 1942: La isla de la pasión
- 1943: Wild Flower – Rogelio Torres
- 1959: The Soldiers of Pancho Villa – Coronel Antonio Zeta
- 1962: Pueblito – Coronel (uncredited)
- 1962: La bandida – Epigmenio Gómez
- 1963: Paloma herida – Danilo Zata
- 1964: El revólver sangriento – Félix Gómez
- 1964: The Night of the Iguana – Barkeeper (uncredited)
- 1964: Yo, el valiente
- 1964: Los hermanos Muerte – Marcos Zermeño
- 1965: The Reward – Sgt. Lopez
- 1965: La conquista de El Dorado
- 1965: Un callejón sin salida – Moran
- 1966: La recta final – Don Lucio
- 1966: Duelo de pistoleros – Pancho Romero
- 1966: The Appaloosa – Lazaro
- 1966: Los malvados – El coyote
- 1966: Return of the Seven – Francisco Lorca
- 1967: A Covenant with Death – Ignacio
- 1967: Un tipo dificil de matar
- 1967: The War Wagon – Calita
- 1967: A Faithful Soldier of Pancho Villa – Aurelio Pérez
- 1967: El silencioso – Emilio Segura
- 1968: Guns for San Sebastian
- 1968: El caudillo – Coronel
- 1968: Un toro me llama
- 1969: The Wild Bunch – General Mapache
- 1969: Duelo en El Dorado – Indio Romo
- 1969: El crepúsculo de un Dios – Himself
- 1970: The Phantom Gunslinger – Sheriff
- 1971: La chamuscada (Tierra y libertad) – Coronel Margarito Herrero
- 1971: La sangre enemiga – Juan
- 1972: Indio – Victorio
- 1972: El rincón de las vírgenes – Anacleto Morones
- 1973: Pat Garrett and Billy the Kid – Paco
- 1974: Bring Me the Head of Alfredo Garcia – El Jefe
- 1974: Breakout – J.V.
- 1975: Lucky Lady – Ybarra
- 1975: Detras de esa puerta – Police Director
- 1976: Zona roja
- 1979: Erótica – Hernández
- 1980: Las cabareteras
- 1982: Una gallina muy ponedora
- 1983: Mercenarios de la Muerte – Maestro tata
- 1984: Under the Volcano – Diosdado
- 1985: The Treasure of the Amazon – Tacho / Paco
- 1985: Lola la trailera – Leoncio's Bodyguard
- 1986: Los Amantes del Señor de la Noche – Don Venustiano
- 1986: The Kidnapping of Lola – Commander Prieto
- 1986: Ahora mis pistolas hablan
- 1987: Arriba Michoacán (final film role)

== Sources ==
- Taibo I., Paco Ignacio (1987). Emilio Fernández <1904–1986>. Universidad de Guadalajara. ISBN 968-895-016-5.
- Domínguez., Columba (1987). Emilio Fernández "El Indio" que amé.
