= Juan Pistolas (1936 film) =

- Directed by: Roberto Curwood
- Written by: Íñigo de Martino
- Produced by: Eduardo de la Barra; Gustavo Sáenz de Sicilia
- Starring: Raúl de Anda; Lucha Ruanova; Javier de la Parra
- Production company: Producciones Mexicanas
- Release date: 1 February 1936
- Country: Mexico
- Language: Spanish

Juan Pistolas is a 1936 Mexican adventure film directed by Roberto Curwood and starring Raúl de Anda, Lucha Ruanova and Javier de la Parra.

== Cast ==
- Raúl de Anda as Juan Pistolas
- Lucha Ruanova as Rosita
- Javier de la Parra as Juanito
- Joaquín Grajales as Don Chencho
- Refugio Silva as Lolita
- Manuel Buendía as Pepe Montes
- David Valle González as Matías
- Ángel Moreno as Ramón
- Isauro Ruiz as Ricardo
- Antonio Peimbert as Pablo Fernández
- Lepe as Medrano
- Ernesto Cuevas as Lucas
- Federico Calcáneo as Federico
- Gilberto González
- Max Langler
- Juan Garcia

== Bibliography ==
- Pick, M. Zuzana. Constructing the Image of the Mexican Revolution: Cinema and the Archive. University of Texas Press, 2010.
