= List of awards and nominations received by Marlon Brando =

Marlon Brando awards and nominations
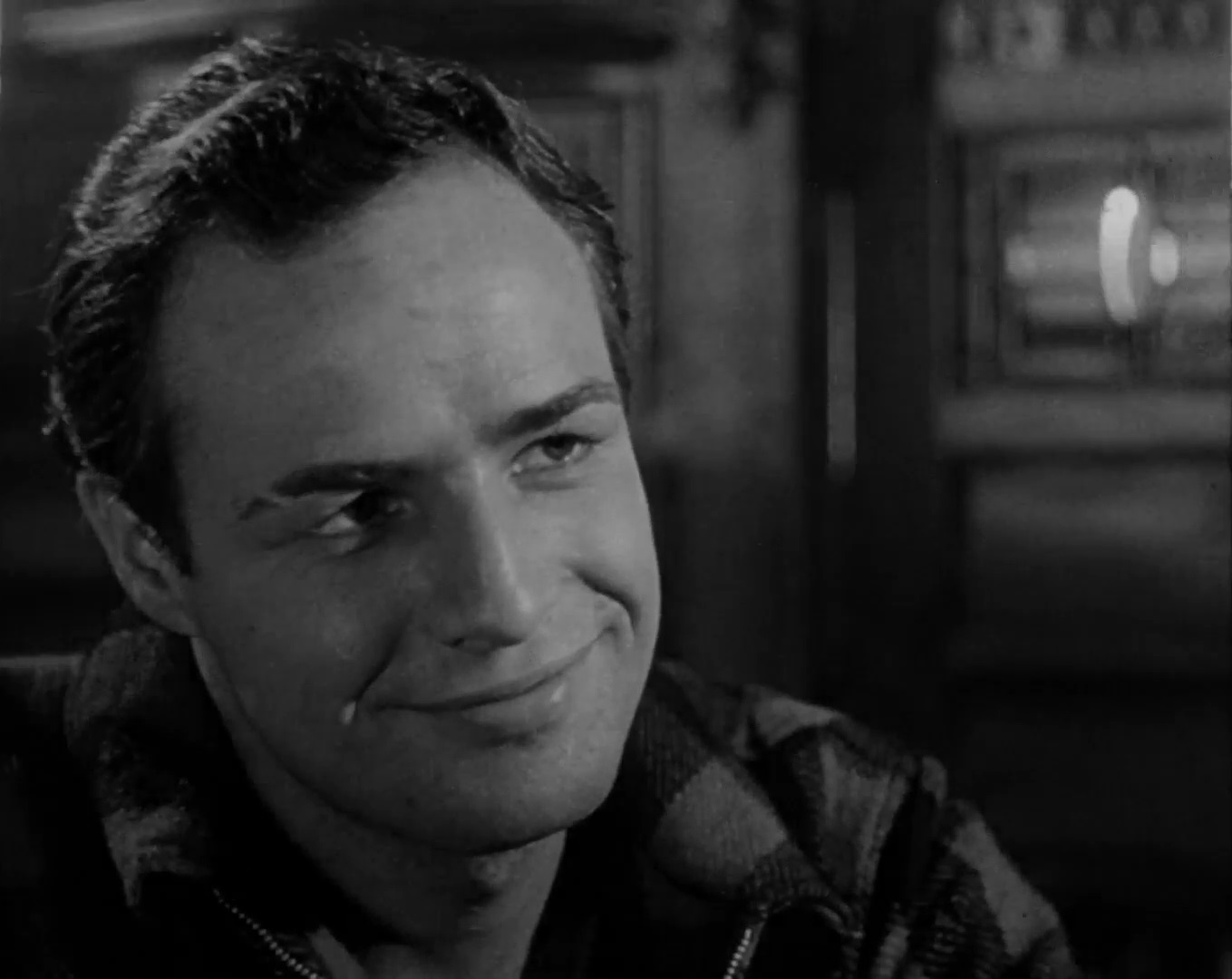
- Brando in On the Waterfront (1954), for which he received his first Academy Award.
Awards and nominations
Award	Wins	Nominations
Academy Awards	2 (Note: Includes a declined award)	8
BAFTA Film Awards	3	8
Bambi Awards	0	1
Cannes Film Festival Awards	1	1
David di Donatello Awards	1	1
DGA Awards	0	1
Golden Globe Awards	5 (Note: Includes a declined award)	10
Jupiter Awards	1	1
Jussi Awards	2	2
National Society of Film Critics Awards	1	2
New York Film Critics Circle Awards	2	6
Primetime Emmy Awards	1	1

Totals (Note: Certain award groups do not simply award one winner. They acknowledge several different recipients, have runners-up, and have third place. Since this is a specific recognition and is different from losing an award, runner-up mentions are considered wins in this award tally. For simplification and to avoid errors, each award in this list has been presumed to have had a prior nomination.)
- Wins: 32
- Nominations: 69

Marlon Brando was an American actor known for his intense leading roles in film. He received numerous awards including two Academy Awards, three BAFTAs, five Golden Globe Awards, a Cannes Film Festival Award, and a Primetime Emmy Award.

He received his first prize, the Theatre World Awards, for his debut performances on the Broadway stages in New York City. Brando made a cinematic impression instantly with his debut performance in The Men (1950), which he succeeded with his iconic portrayal of Stanley Kowalski in A Streetcar Named Desire (1951). He received his first of four consecutive Oscar nominations for the latter, which is a record in the Best Actor category and just 1 shy of the grand total held by both Bette Davis and Greer Garson, with 5 each, in Best Actress.

He would next receive Oscar nominations for portraying Emiliano Zapata in Viva Zapata! (1952); Mark Antony in Julius Caesar (1953); and finally, Terry Malloy in On the Waterfront (1954), for which he garnered his first Academy Award and Golden Globe victory. He also won the Cannes Best Actor prize for Viva Zapata!. He earned further Golden Globes attention as Best Comedy/Musical Actor for The Teahouse of the August Moon (1956), but also some backlash for doing "yellowface" (white actors portraying Asian characters). Sayonara (1957) earned him his fifth Oscar nomination, and third Globe recognition for a film. The Young Lions (1958) netted him his fourth BAFTA nomination. And The Ugly American (1963) garnered him his fourth Golden Globe nomination for a performance.

His iconic role as Don Vito Corleone in The Godfather (1972) accrued nominations from all 3 awards contingents. He received his second Academy Award and another Golden Globe, but controversially declined both awards. At the 1973 Oscars telecast, he sent Sacheen Littlefeather in his place to announce his refusal on behalf of "Hollywood's unfavorable depiction of Native Americans". He followed that up with his highly acclaimed performance in the controversial film, Last Tango in Paris (1972), earning his seventh Academy Award nomination. The Jupiter Awards honored his performance in Apocalypse Now (1979), and he won an Emmy Award portraying neo-nazi George Lincoln Rockwell in the television miniseries Roots: The Next Generations (1979). He was also nominated by the Directors Guild of America for his directorial achievement on One-Eyed Jacks (1961), a film which also won him the Golden Shell at the San Sebastián International Film Festival.

His career featured some critically panned performances, notably in The Formula (1980) and The Island of Dr. Moreau (1996), both of which earned dubious distinction from the Razzie Awards and Stinkers Bad Movie Awards. He won Worst Supporting Actor for the latter film from both organizations. However, he did receive his eighth Oscar nomination, and subsequent BAFTA and Golden Globe recognition, for his supporting performance in A Dry White Season (1989). These would become his final major distinctions in his six-decades-long career.

== Major film awards ==
Table key
§	Indicates a declined award
†	Indicates a posthumous award

=== Academy Awards ===
Year	Category	Nominated work	Result	Ref.
1952	Best Actor	A Streetcar Named Desire	Nominated	
1953	Best Actor	Viva Zapata!	Nominated	
1954	Best Actor	Julius Caesar	Nominated	
1955	Best Actor	On the Waterfront	Won	
1958	Best Actor	Sayonara	Nominated	
1973	Best Actor	The Godfather	Won_{§} (Note: Brando did not attend the 1973 Academy Awards ceremony. Instead, he boycotted it and sent actress Sacheen Littlefeather to represent him. When he was announced the winner for The Godfather, she took the stage with his prepared speech. Although unable to read it in its entirety, she summarized that he was protesting Hollywood's negative portrayal of Native Americans. (This occurred shortly after the Wounded Knee Occupation protest as well.) The vicarious speech elicited a mixture of applause and boos. Littlefeather received death threats following her appearance.)	
1974	Best Actor	Last Tango in Paris	Nominated	
1990	Best Supporting Actor	A Dry White Season	Nominated	

=== BAFTA Awards ===
Year	Category	Nominated work	Result	Ref.
British Academy Film Awards
1953	Best Foreign Actor	Viva Zapata!	Won	
1954	Best Foreign Actor	Julius Caesar	Won	
1955	Best Foreign Actor	On the Waterfront	Won	
1959	Best Foreign Actor	The Young Lions	Nominated	
1973	Best Actor in a Leading Role	The Godfather	Nominated	
1973	Best Actor in a Leading Role	The Nightcomers	Nominated	
1974	Best Actor in a Leading Role	Last Tango in Paris	Nominated	
1990	Best Actor in a Supporting Role	A Dry White Season	Nominated	

=== Emmy Awards ===
Year	Category	Nominated work	Result	Ref.
Primetime Emmy Awards
1979	Outstanding Supporting Actor in a Limited Series or Movie	Roots: The Next Generations	Won	

=== Golden Globe Awards ===
Year	Category	Nominated work	Result	Ref.
1955	Best Actor in a Motion Picture – Drama	On the Waterfront	Won	
1955	Henrietta Award (World Film Favorite – Male)	—N/a	Nominated	
1956	Henrietta Award (World Film Favorite – Male)	—N/a	Won	
1957	Best Actor in a Motion Picture – Comedy or Musical	The Teahouse of the August Moon	Nominated	
1958	Best Actor in a Motion Picture – Drama	Sayonara	Nominated	
1964	Best Actor in a Motion Picture – Drama	The Ugly American	Nominated	
1973	Best Actor in a Motion Picture – Drama	The Godfather	Won_{§} (Note: Brando refused the Golden Globe win, on account of U.S.A.'s "imperialism and racism".)	
1973	Henrietta Award (World Film Favorite – Male)	—N/a	Won	
1974	Henrietta Award (World Film Favorite – Male)	—N/a	Won	
1990	Best Supporting Actor — Motion Picture	A Dry White Season	Nominated	

== International awards ==
Year	Awards ceremony	Category	Nominated work	Result	Ref.
1952	Cannes Film Festival	Best Actor	Viva Zapata!	Won	
1952	Jussi Awards	Best Foreign Actor	The Men	Won	
1952	Jussi Awards	Best Foreign Actor	A Streetcar Named Desire	Won	
1955	Bambi Awards	Best Actor — International	On the Waterfront	Nominated	
1958	David di Donatello Awards	Best Foreign Actor	Sayonara	Won (Note: Tied with Charles Laughton, for his performance in Witness for the Prosecution (1957).)	
1961	San Sebastián International Film Festival	Golden Shell (Best Film)	One-Eyed Jacks	Won	
1973	Jussi Awards	Actor of the Year	N/A	Won	
1989	Tokyo International Film Festival	Best Actor	A Dry White Season	Won	

== Critics' awards ==
Year	Awards ceremony	Category	Nominated work	Character	Result	Ref.
1951	New York Film Critics Circle	Best Actor	A Streetcar Named Desire	Stanley Kowalski	Runner-Up	
1954	New York Film Critics Circle	Best Actor	On the Waterfront	Terry Malloy	Won	
1957	New York Film Critics Circle	Best Actor	Sayonara	Maj. Lloyd "Ace" Gruver, USAF	Runner-Up	
1972	National Society of Film Critics	Best Actor	The Godfather	(Don) Vito Corleone	Runner-Up	
1973	New York Film Critics Circle	Best Actor	The Godfather	(Don) Vito Corleone	Runner-Up	
1973	Kansas City Film Critics Circle	Best Actor	The Godfather	(Don) Vito Corleone	Won (Note: Tied for 1st place with Stacy Keach, for his performance in Fat City (1972).)	
1974	National Society of Film Critics	Best Actor	Last Tango in Paris	Paul	Won	
1974	New York Film Critics Circle	Best Actor	Last Tango in Paris	Paul	Won	
1989	New York Film Critics Circle	Best Supporting Actor	A Dry White Season	Ian McKenzie	3rd Place	
1990	Chicago Film Critics Association	Best Supporting Actor	A Dry White Season	Ian McKenzie	Nominated	

== Miscellaneous ==
Other major industry awards
Year	Awards ceremony	Category	Nominated work	Result	Ref.
1962	DGA Awards	Outstanding Directorial Achievement — Feature Film	One-Eyed Jacks	Nominated	
Various minor awards
Year	Awards ceremony	Category	Nominated work	Result	Ref.
1946	Theatre World Awards	Outstanding NYC Stage Debut Performance(s)	Candida	Recipient (Note: Brando was among several cited recipients of that theatrical season (1945-1946), including: Barbara Bel Geddes, Deep Are the Roots; Bill Callahan, Call Me Mister; Wendell Corey, The Wind Is Ninety; Paul Douglas, Born Yesterday; Mary James, Apple of His Eye; Burt Lancaster, A Sound of Hunting; Patricia Marshall, The Day Before Spring; and Beatrice Pearson, The Mermaids Singing.)	
1946	Theatre World Awards	Outstanding NYC Stage Debut Performance(s)	Truckline Café	Recipient	
1957	Laurel Awards	Top Male Comedic Performance	The Teahouse of the August Moon	Won	
1958	Laurel Awards	Top Male Dramatic Performance	The Young Lions	Won	
1967	Western Heritage Awards	Bronze Wrangler	The Appaloosa	Won (Note: The award was a joint prize, shared amongst Sidney J. Furie (director); James Bridges, Roland Kibbee (screenwriters); Robert MacLeod (original novel author); & Marlon Brando, Anjanette Comer, John Saxon (actors/actress).)	
1972	Fotogramas de Plata	Best Foreign Movie Performer	Burn!	Won	
1980	Jupiter Awards	Best International Actor	Apocalypse Now	Nominated	
1981	Stinkers Bad Movie Awards	Worst Supporting Actor	The Formula	Nominated	
1981	Stinkers Bad Movie Awards	Most Annoying Fake Accent: Male	The Formula	Nominated	
1981	Razzie Awards	Worst Supporting Actor	The Formula	Nominated	
1992	Razzie Awards	Worst Supporting Actor	Christopher Columbus: The Discovery	Nominated	
1997	Razzie Awards	Worst Supporting Actor	The Island of Dr. Moreau	Won	
1997	Razzie Awards	Worst Screen Couple/Combo (Shared with Nelson de la Rosa, who played Majai)	The Island of Dr. Moreau	Nominated	
1997	Stinkers Bad Movie Awards	Worst Supporting Actor	The Island of Dr. Moreau	Won	
1997	Stinkers Bad Movie Awards	Worst On-Screen Hairstyle	The Island of Dr. Moreau	Nominated	

== Special citations ==
Non-specific and honorary accolades
Year	Awards ceremony	Category	Result	Ref.
1958	Laurel Awards	Golden Laurel – Top Male Star	Nominated	
1959	Laurel Awards	Golden Laurel – Top Male Star	Nominated	
1960	Hollywood Walk of Fame	Motion Picture Star	Inducted	
1961	Laurel Awards	Golden Laurel – Top Male Star	12th Place	
1961	Golden Apple Awards	Sour Apple for Least Cooperative Actor	Winner	
1975	People's Choice Awards	Favorite Motion Picture Actor	Nominated	
1975	Photoplay Awards	Favorite Male Motion Picture Star	Nominated	
1976	Photoplay Awards	Favorite Male Motion Picture Star	Nominated	
1978	Photoplay Awards	Favorite Male Motion Picture Star	Nominated	
1980	The Golden Turkey Awards	Most Ludicrous Racial Impersonation: (As a native of Okinawa, Japan in The Teahouse of the August Moon)	Received	
2000	Online Film & Television Association	Film Hall of Fame: Acting	Received	
2004	Italian Online Movie Awards	Lifetime Achievement Award	Received^{†}	
2021	Online Film & Television Association	Film Hall of Fame: [Character — (Don) Vito Corleone, The Godfather]	Received^{†}	

== All-Time Rankings ==
The following are the results from various polls.

All-Time Rankings
Rank	Organisation	Category	Lost to	Ref.
1st	Film School WTF	Top 100 Best Hollywood Actors Of All Time	—N/a	
2nd	Filmsite	100 Greatest Movie Performances of All Time	Peter O'Toole	
2nd	Internet Movie Database (IMDb)	Top 100 Greatest Actors of All Time (The Ultimate List)	Jack Nicholson	
4th	AMC	The 50 Greatest Actors of All Time	Tom Hanks	
4th	American Film Institute (AFI)	100 Years...100 Stars	Humphrey Bogart	
8th	TheTopTens	Top Ten Greatest Actors	Johnny Depp	
10th	Internet Movie Database (IMDb)	Best Actors - Top 250	Jack Nicholson	

== See also ==
- List of Marlon Brando performances
