= Marlon Brando =

American actor (1924–2004)

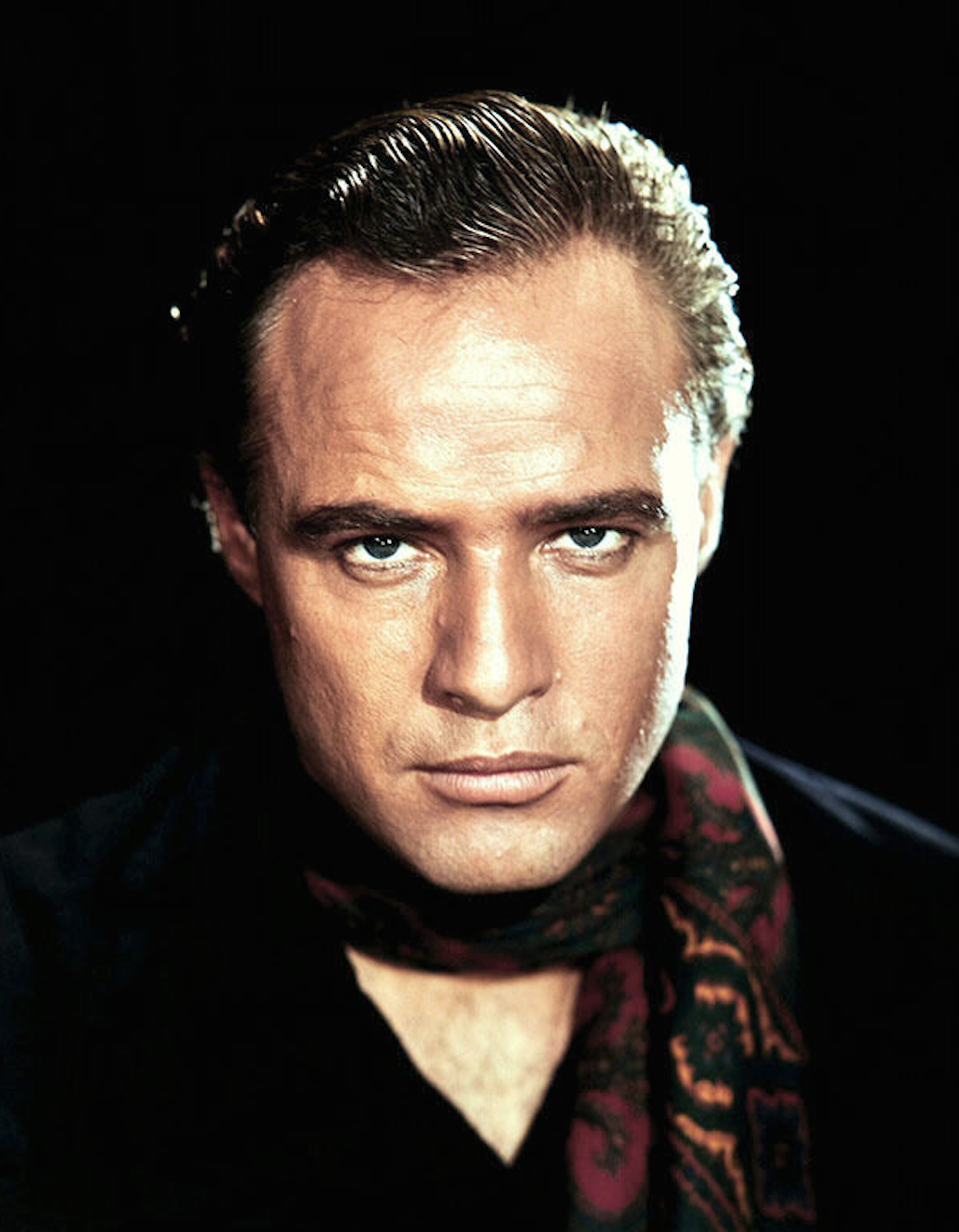
- Brando in a publicity photo for the film One-Eyed Jacks (1961)
- Born: Marlon Brando Jr. April 3, 1924; Omaha, Nebraska, U.S.
- Died: July 1, 2004 (aged 80); Los Angeles, California, U.S.
- Occupation: Actor
- Years active: 1944–2004
- Works: Full list
- Spouses: Anna Kashfi (m. 1957; div. 1959) Movita Castaneda (m. 1960; ann. 1968)
- Partner: Tarita Teriipaia (1962–1972)
- Children: 11, including Christian and Cheyenne
- Relatives: Jocelyn Brando (sister)
- Awards: Full list
- Website: marlonbrando.com

Marlon Brando (/ˈmɑːrlən ˈbrændoʊ/; April 3, 1924 – July 1, 2004) was an American actor. Widely regarded as one of the greatest and most influential performers in the history of cinema, he received numerous accolades, including two Academy Awards, two Golden Globe Awards, three BAFTAs, a Cannes Film Festival Award, and a Primetime Emmy Award. Brando is credited with being one of the first actors to bring the Stanislavski system of acting and method acting to mainstream audiences.

Brando came under the influence of Stella Adler and Stanislavski's system in the 1940s. He began his career on stage, where he was lauded for adeptly interpreting his characters. He made his Broadway debut in the play I Remember Mama (1944) and won Theater World Awards for his performances in Candida and Truckline Cafe (1946). He returned to Broadway as Stanley Kowalski in the Tennessee Williams play A Streetcar Named Desire (1947), a role he reprised in the 1951 film adaptation directed by Elia Kazan.

He made his film debut playing a wounded G.I. in The Men (1950) and won two Academy Awards for Best Actor for his performances as dockworker Terry Malloy in On the Waterfront (1954) and crime boss Vito Corleone in The Godfather (1972). He was also Oscar-nominated for playing Stanley Kowalski in A Streetcar Named Desire (1951), Emiliano Zapata in Viva Zapata! (1952), Mark Antony in Julius Caesar (1953), an air force pilot in Sayonara (1957), an American expatriate in Last Tango in Paris (1973), and a lawyer in A Dry White Season (1989).

Brando was known for portraying rebellious characters who later became popular icons, such as Johnny Strabler in The Wild One (1953), and he came to be seen as an emblem of the era's "generation gap". He also starred in films such as Guys and Dolls (1955), The Young Lions (1958), The Fugitive Kind (1960), The Chase (1966), Burn! (1969), The Missouri Breaks (1976), Superman (1978), Apocalypse Now (1979), and The Freshman (1990). He made his directorial debut with, and also starred in, the western drama One-Eyed Jacks (1961), which performed poorly at the box office.

On television, Brando won the Primetime Emmy Award for Outstanding Supporting Actor in a Limited Series or Movie for his role in the ABC miniseries Roots: The Next Generations (1979), after which he took a nine-year hiatus from acting. He later returned to film with varying degrees of commercial and critical success. The last two decades of his life were marked by controversy, and his troubled private life received significant public attention, including struggles with mood disorders and legal issues. His final films included The Island of Dr. Moreau (1996) and The Score (2001).

== Early life and education ==
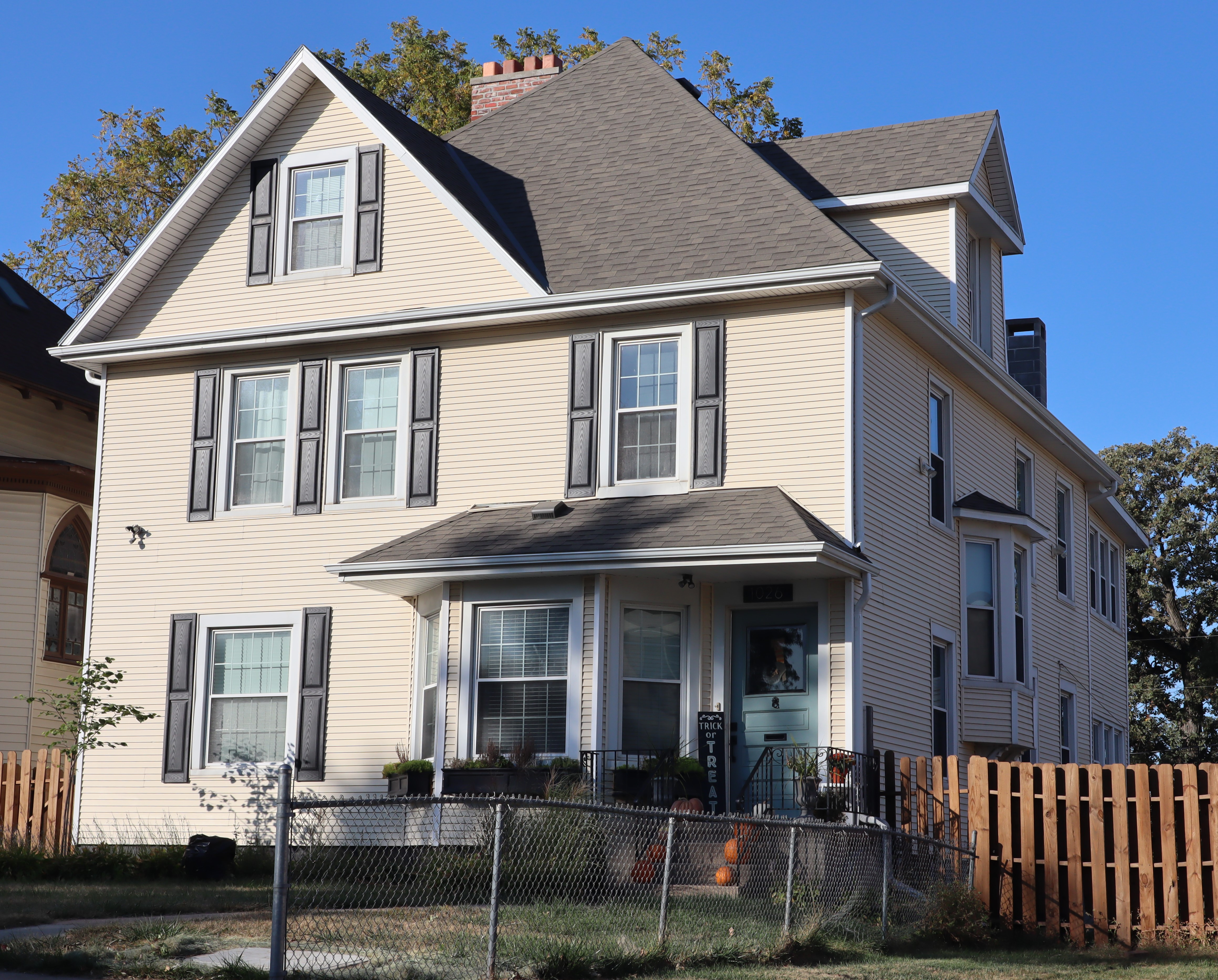
Brando's childhood home in Omaha

Marlon Brando Jr. was born on April 3, 1924, in Omaha, Nebraska, the only son of Marlon Brando Sr. and Dorothy Pennebaker. His father was a salesman who frequently travelled out-of-state, while his mother was a stage actress who was often away from home. His mother's absence resulted in Brando becoming attached to the family's housekeeper, who eventually left to get married, causing Brando to develop abandonment issues. His two elder sisters were Jocelyn and Frances.

Despite some of his most notable film roles, Brando did not have Italian ancestry. Brando's ancestry was mostly German, Dutch, English, and Irish. His patrilineal immigrant ancestor, Johann Wilhelm Brandau, arrived in New York City in the early 1700s from the Palatinate in Germany. Brando was also a descendant of Louis DuBois, a French Huguenot, who arrived in New York around 1660. His maternal great-grandfather, Myles Joseph Gahan, was an Irish immigrant who served as a medic in the American Civil War. In 1995, Marlon gave an interview in Ireland in which he said, "I have never been so happy in my life. When I got off the plane I had this rush of emotion. I have never felt at home in a place as I do here. I am seriously contemplating Irish citizenship."

In 1930, when Brando was six years old, the family moved to Evanston, Illinois, where Brando mimicked other people, developed a reputation for pranking, and met American actor Wally Cox, with whom he remained friends until Cox's death in 1973. In 1936, his parents separated and he and his siblings moved with their mother to Santa Ana, California. Two years later, his parents reconciled, and his father purchased a farmhouse in Libertyville, Illinois. Brando attended Libertyville High School, excelling at sports and drama, but failing in every other subject. Consequently, he was held back for a year, and with his history of misbehaving, he was expelled in 1941.

Brando was sent by his father to Shattuck Military Academy, where his father had also studied. There, Brando continued to excel at acting until 1943, when he was put on probation for being insubordinate to an officer during maneuvers. He was confined to the campus, but sneaked into town and was caught. The faculty voted to expel him, although he was supported by the students who thought expulsion was too harsh. Brando was invited back for the following year, but decided instead to drop out of high school. He then worked as a ditch-digger at a summer job arranged by his father and tried to enlist in the Army, but his routine physical revealed that a football injury he had sustained at Shattuck had left him with a trick knee; he was classified physically unfit for military service.

Brando decided to follow his sisters to New York, studying at the American Theatre Wing Professional School, part of the Dramatic Workshop of the New School, with influential German director Erwin Piscator. In a 1988 documentary, Marlon Brando: The Wild One, Brando's sister Jocelyn remembered, "He was in a school play and enjoyed it ... So he decided he would go to New York and study acting because that was the only thing he had enjoyed. That was when he was 18." In the A&E Biography episode on Brando, George Englund said Brando fell into acting in New York because "he was accepted there. He wasn't criticized. It was the first time in his life that he heard good things about himself." He spent his first few months in New York sleeping on friends' couches. For a time he lived with Roy Somlyo, who later became a four-time Emmy-winning Broadway producer.

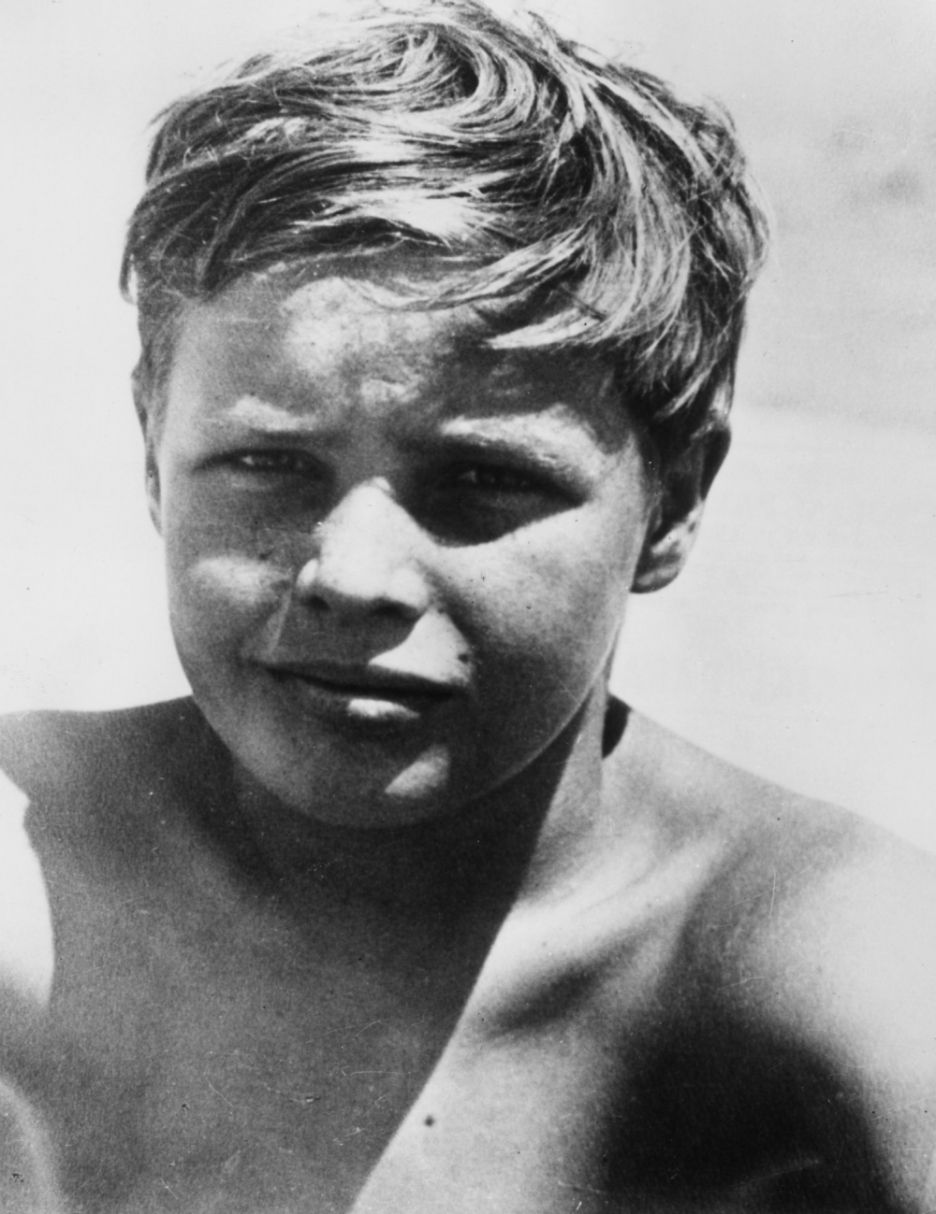
Brando at age ten

Brando was an avid student and proponent of Stella Adler, from whom he learned the techniques of the Stanislavski system. This technique encouraged the actor to explore both internal and external aspects to fully realize the character being portrayed. Brando's remarkable insight and sense of realism were evident early on. Adler used to recount that, when teaching Brando, she had instructed the class to act like chickens, and added that a nuclear bomb was about to fall on them. Most of the class clucked and ran around wildly, but Brando sat calmly and pretended to lay an egg. Asked by Adler why he had chosen to react this way, he said, "I'm a chicken—what do I know about bombs?" Despite being commonly regarded as a method actor, Brando disagreed. He claimed to have abhorred Lee Strasberg's teachings:

After I had some success, Lee Strasberg tried to take credit for teaching me how to act. He never taught me anything. He would have claimed credit for the sun and the moon if he believed he could get away with it. He was an ambitious, selfish man who exploited the people who attended the Actors Studio and tried to project himself as an acting oracle and guru. Some people worshipped him, but I never knew why. I sometimes went to the Actors Studio on Saturday mornings because Elia Kazan was teaching, and there were usually a lot of good-looking girls, but Strasberg never taught me acting. Stella (Adler) did—and later Kazan.

Brando was the first to bring a natural approach to acting on film. According to Dustin Hoffman in his online Masterclass, Brando would often talk to cameramen and fellow actors about their weekend even after the director would call action. Once Brando felt he could deliver the dialogue as naturally as that conversation, he would start the dialogue. In the 2015 Brando documentary, Listen to Me Marlon, he says that before such a feeling of naturalness, actors seemed like breakfast cereals, meaning they were predictable. Critics would later say that this was Brando being difficult, but actors who worked opposite him said it was just all part of his technique.

== Career ==
=== 1944–1950: Early career ===
Brando used his Stanislavski System skills for his first summer stock roles in Sayville, New York, on Long Island. Brando established a pattern of erratic, insubordinate behavior in the few shows he had been in. His behavior had him kicked out of the cast of the New School's production in Sayville, but he was soon afterwards discovered in a locally produced play there. Then, in 1944, he made it to Broadway in the bittersweet drama I Remember Mama, playing the son of Mady Christians. The Lunts wanted Brando to play the role of Alfred Lunt's son in O Mistress Mine, and Lunt even coached him for the audition, but Brando made no attempt to even read his lines at the audition and was not hired. New York Drama Critics voted him "Most Promising Young Actor" for his role as an anguished veteran in Truckline Café, although the play was a commercial failure. In 1946, he appeared on Broadway as the young hero in the political drama A Flag Is Born, refusing to accept wages above the Actors' Equity rate. In that same year, Brando played the role of Marchbanks alongside Katharine Cornell in her production's revival of Candida, one of her signature roles. Cornell also cast him as the Messenger in her production of Jean Anouilh's Antigone that same year. He was also offered the opportunity to portray one of the principal characters in the Broadway premiere of Eugene O'Neill's The Iceman Cometh, but turned the part down after falling asleep while trying to read the massive script and pronouncing the play "ineptly written and poorly constructed".

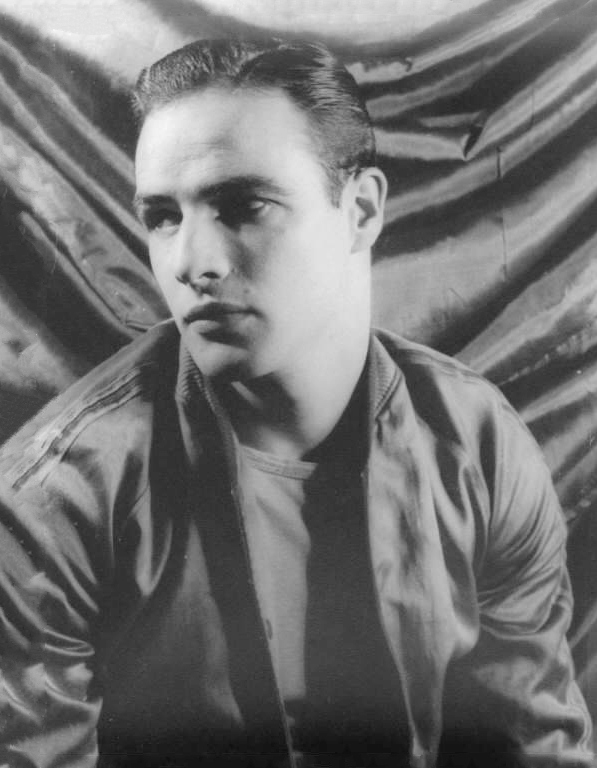
Brando photographed by Carl Van Vechten

In 1945, Brando's agent recommended he take a co-starring role in The Eagle Has Two Heads with Tallulah Bankhead, produced by Jack Wilson. Bankhead had turned down the role of Blanche Dubois in A Streetcar Named Desire, which Williams had written for her, to tour the play for the 1946–1947 season. Bankhead recognized Brando's potential, despite her disdain (which most Broadway veterans shared) for method acting, and agreed to hire him even though he auditioned poorly. The two clashed greatly during the pre-Broadway tour, with Bankhead reminding Brando of his mother, being her age and also having a drinking problem. Wilson was largely tolerant of Brando's behavior, but he reached his limit when Brando mumbled through a dress rehearsal shortly before the November 28, 1946, opening. "I don't care what your grandmother did," Wilson exclaimed, "and that Method stuff, I want to know what you're going to do!" Brando in turn raised his voice, and acted with great power and passion. "It was marvelous," a cast member recalled. "Everybody hugged him and kissed him. He came ambling offstage and said to me, 'They don't think you can act unless you can yell.'"

Critics were not as kind, however. A review of Brando's performance in the opening assessed that Brando was "still building his character, but at present fails to impress." One Boston critic remarked of Brando's prolonged death scene, "Brando looked like a car in midtown Manhattan searching for a parking space." He received better reviews at subsequent tour stops, but what his colleagues recalled was only occasional indications of the talent he would later demonstrate. "There were a few times when he was really magnificent," Bankhead admitted to an interviewer in 1962. "He was a great young actor when he wanted to be, but most of the time I couldn't even hear him on the stage."

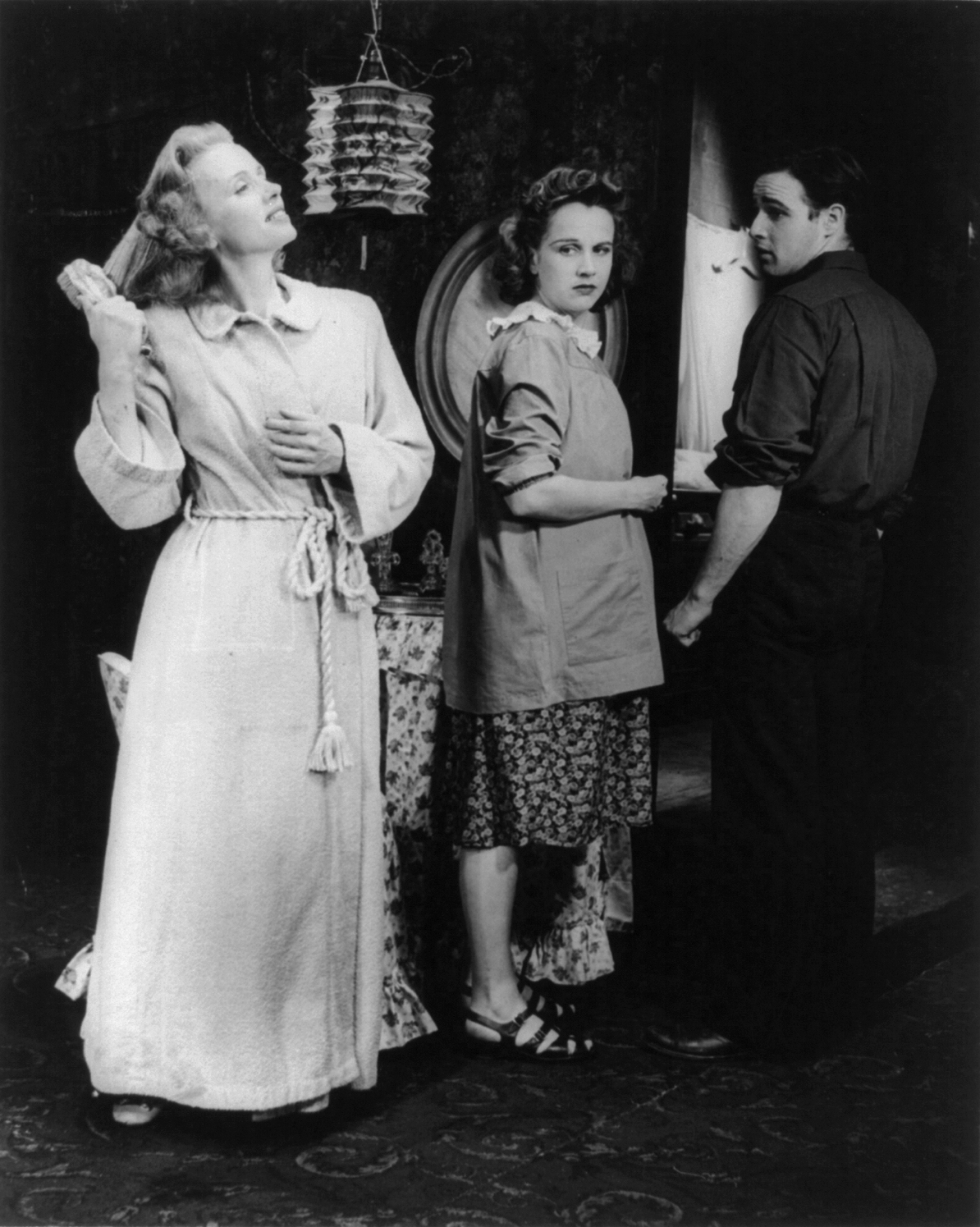
From left to right: Jessica Tandy, Kim Hunter and Brando in the original 1947 Broadway production of A Streetcar Named Desire.

Brando displayed his apathy for the production by demonstrating some shocking onstage manners. He "tried everything in the world to ruin it for her," Bankhead's stage manager claimed. "He nearly drove her crazy: scratching his crotch, picking his nose, doing anything." After several weeks on the road, they reached Boston, by which time Bankhead was ready to dismiss him. This proved to be one of the greatest blessings of his career, as it freed him up to play the role of Stanley Kowalski in Tennessee Williams' 1947 play A Streetcar Named Desire, directed by Elia Kazan. Moreover, to that end, Bankhead herself, in her letter declining Williams' invitation to play the role of Blanche, gave Brando this ringing—albeit acid-tongued—endorsement stating "I do have one suggestion for casting. I know of an actor who can appear as this brutish Stanley Kowalski character. I mean, a total pig of a man without sensitivity or grace of any kind. Marlon Brando would be perfect as Stanley. I have just fired the cad from my play, The Eagle Has Two Heads, and I know for a fact that he is looking for work".

Pierpont writes that John Garfield was first choice for the role, but "made impossible demands." It was Kazan's decision to fall back on the far less experienced (and technically too young for the role) Brando. In a letter dated August 29, 1947, Williams confided to his agent Audrey Wood: "It had not occurred to me before what an excellent value would come through casting a very young actor in this part. It humanizes the character of Stanley in that it becomes the brutality and callousness of youth rather than a vicious old man ... A new value came out of Brando's reading which was by far the best reading I have ever heard." Brando based his portrayal of Kowalski on the boxer Rocky Graziano, whom he had studied at a local gymnasium. Graziano did not know who Brando was, but attended the production with tickets provided by the young man. He said, "The curtain went up and on the stage is that son of a bitch from the gym, and he's playing me."

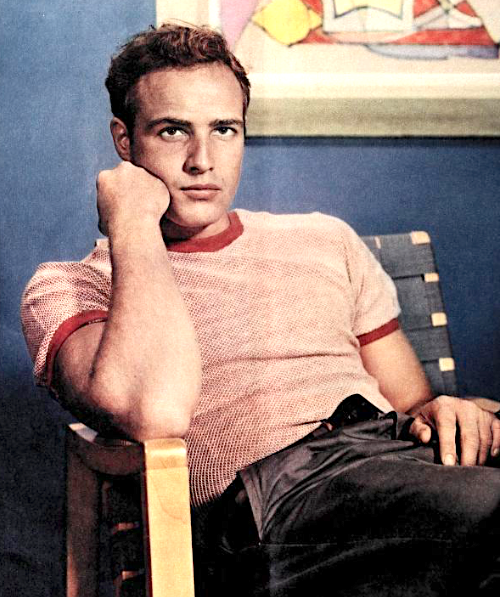
Brando in 1950

In 1947, Brando performed a screen test for an early Warner Brothers script for the novel Rebel Without a Cause (1944), which bore no relation to the film eventually produced in 1955. The screen test is included as an extra in the 2006 DVD release of A Streetcar Named Desire. Brando's first screen role was a bitter paraplegic veteran in The Men (1950). He spent a month in bed at the Birmingham Army Hospital in Van Nuys to prepare for the role. The New York Times reviewer Bosley Crowther wrote that Brando as Ken "is so vividly real, dynamic and sensitive that his illusion is complete" and noted, "Out of stiff and frozen silences he can lash into a passionate rage with the tearful and flailing frenzy of a taut cable suddenly cut."

By Brando's own account, it may have been because of this film that his draft status was changed from 4-F to 1-A. He had had surgery on his trick knee, and it was no longer physically debilitating enough to incur exclusion from the draft. When Brando reported to the induction center, he answered a questionnaire by saying his race was "human", his color was "Seasonal-oyster white to beige", and he told an Army doctor that he was psychoneurotic. When the draft board referred him to a psychiatrist, Brando explained that he had been expelled from military school and had severe problems with authority. Coincidentally, the psychiatrist knew a doctor friend of Brando. Brando avoided military service during the Korean War.

Early in his career, Brando began using cue cards instead of memorizing his lines. Despite the objections of several of the film directors he worked with, Brando felt that this helped bring realism and spontaneity to his performances. He felt otherwise he would appear to be reciting a writer's speech. In the TV documentary The Making of Superman: The Movie, Brando explained: "If you don't know what the words are but you have a general idea of what they are, then you look at the cue card and it gives you the feeling to the viewer, hopefully, that the person is really searching for what he is going to say—that he doesn't know what to say". Some, however, thought Brando used the cards out of laziness or an inability to memorize his lines. Once, on the set of The Godfather, Brando was asked why he wanted his lines printed out. He responded: "Because I can read them that way."

=== 1951–1954: Stardom and On the Waterfront ===
Brando brought his performance as Stanley Kowalski to the screen in Tennessee Williams' A Streetcar Named Desire (1951). It earned him his first Academy Award nomination in the Best Actor category. The role is regarded as one of Brando's greatest.

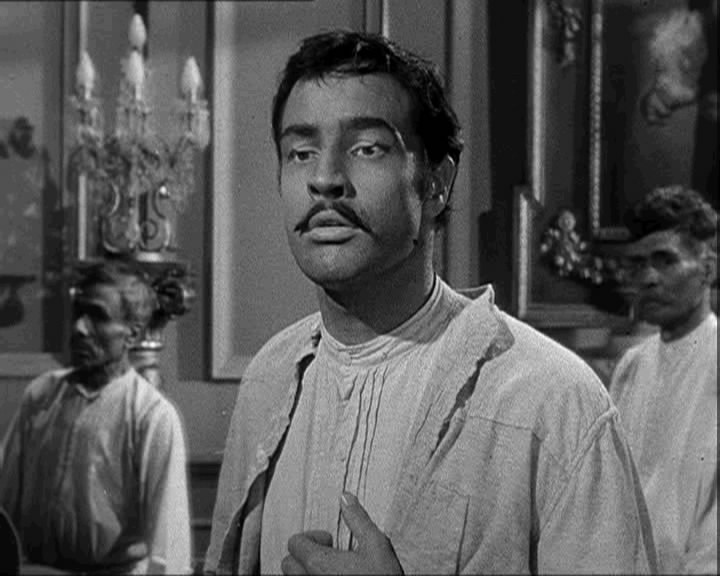
Brando as Emiliano Zapata in Viva Zapata! (1952)

He was also nominated the next year for Viva Zapata! (1952), a fictionalized account of the life of Mexican revolutionary Emiliano Zapata. The film recounted Zapata's lower-class upbringing, his rise to power in the early 20th century, and death. The film was directed by Elia Kazan and co-starred Anthony Quinn. In the biopic Marlon Brando: The Wild One, Sam Shaw says: "Secretly, before the picture started, he went to Mexico to the very town where Zapata lived and was born in and it was there that he studied the speech patterns of people, their behavior, movement." Most critics focused on the actor rather than the film, with Time and Newsweek publishing rave reviews.

Years later, in his autobiography, Brando remarked: "Tony Quinn, whom I admired professionally and liked personally, played my brother, but he was extremely cold to me while we shot that picture. During our scenes together, I sensed a bitterness toward me, and if I suggested a drink after work, he either turned me down or else was sullen and said little. Only years later did I learn why." Brando explained that, to create on-screen tension between the two, "Gadg" (Kazan) had told Quinn – who had taken over the role of Stanley Kowalski from Brando on Broadway – that Brando had been unimpressed with his work. After achieving the desired effect, Kazan never told Quinn that he had misled him. It was only many years later, after comparing notes, that Brando and Quinn realized the deception.

Brando's next film, Julius Caesar (1953), received highly favorable reviews. Brando portrayed Mark Antony. While most acknowledged Brando's talent, some critics felt Brando's "mumbling" and other idiosyncrasies betrayed a lack of acting fundamentals and, when his casting was announced, many remained dubious about his prospects for success. Directed by Joseph L. Mankiewicz and co-starring British stage actor John Gielgud, Brando delivered an impressive performance, especially during Antony's noted "Friends, Romans, countrymen ..." speech. Gielgud was so impressed that he offered Brando a full season at the Hammersmith Theatre, an offer he declined. In his biography on the actor, Stefan Kanfer writes, "Marlon's autobiography devotes one line to his work on that film: Among all those British professionals, 'for me to walk onto a movie set and play Mark Anthony was asinine'—yet another example of his persistent self-denigration, and wholly incorrect."

Kanfer adds that after a screening of the film, director John Huston commented: "Christ! It was like a furnace door opening—the heat came off the screen. I don't know another actor who could do that." During the filming of Julius Caesar, Brando learned that Elia Kazan had cooperated with congressional investigators, naming a whole string of "subversives" to the House Committee on Un-American Activities (HUAC). By all accounts, Brando was upset by his mentor's decision, but he worked with him again in On The Waterfront. "None of us is perfect," he later wrote in his memoir, "and I think that Gadg has done injury to others, but mostly to himself."

In 1953, Brando also starred in The Wild One, riding his own Triumph Thunderbird 6T motorcycle. Triumph's importers were ambivalent at the exposure, as the subject matter was rowdy motorcycle gangs taking over a small town. The film was criticized for its perceived gratuitous violence at the time, with Time stating: "The effect of the movie is not to throw light on the public problem, but to shoot adrenaline through the moviegoer's veins." Brando allegedly did not see eye to eye with the Hungarian director László Benedek and did not get on with costar Lee Marvin.

To Brando's expressed puzzlement, the movie inspired teen rebellion and made him a role model to the nascent rock-and-roll generation and future stars such as James Dean and Elvis Presley. After the movie's release, the sales of leather jackets and motorcycles skyrocketed. Reflecting on the movie in his autobiography, Brando concluded that it had not aged very well but said "More than most parts I've played in the movies or onstage, I related to Johnny, and because of this, I believe I played him as more sensitive and sympathetic than the script envisioned. There's a line in the picture where he snarls, 'Nobody tells me what to do.' That's exactly how I've felt all my life."

Later that same year, Brando co-starred with fellow Studio member William Redfield in a summer stock production of George Bernard Shaw's Arms and the Man.

In 1954, Brando starred in On the Waterfront, a crime drama film about union violence and corruption among longshoremen. The film was directed by Elia Kazan and written by Budd Schulberg; it also starred Karl Malden, Lee J. Cobb, Rod Steiger and, in her film debut, Eva Marie Saint. When initially offered the role, Brando—still stung by Kazan's testimony to HUAC—demurred and the part of Terry Malloy nearly went to Frank Sinatra. According to biographer Stefan Kanfer, the director believed that Sinatra, who grew up in Hoboken (where the film takes place and was shot), would work as Malloy, but eventually producer Sam Spiegel wooed Brando to the part, signing him for $100,000. "Kazan made no protest because, he subsequently confessed, 'I always preferred Brando to anybody.'"

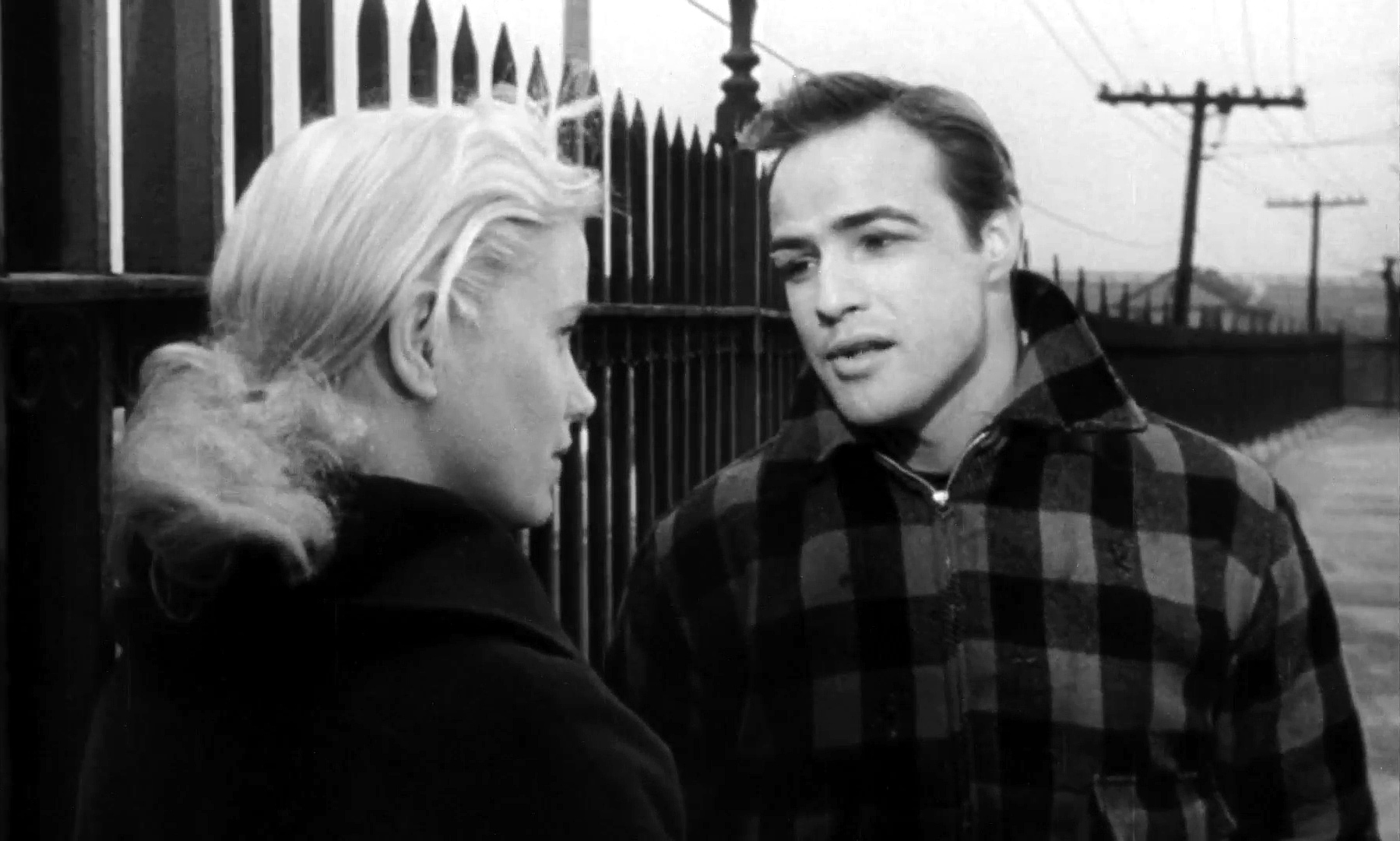
Eva Marie Saint and Brando in On the Waterfront (1954)

Brando won the Oscar for his role as Irish-American stevedore Terry Malloy in On the Waterfront. His performance, spurred on by his rapport with Eva Marie Saint and Kazan's direction, was praised as a tour de force. For the scene in which Terry laments his failings, saying I coulda been a contender, he convinced Kazan that the scripted scene was unrealistic. Schulberg's script had Brando acting the entire scene with his character being held at gunpoint by his brother Charlie, played by Rod Steiger. Brando insisted on gently pushing away the gun, saying that Terry would never believe that his brother would pull the trigger and doubting that he could continue his speech while fearing a gun on him. Kazan let Brando improvise and later expressed deep admiration for Brando's instinctive understanding, saying:

what was extraordinary about his performance, I feel, is the contrast of the tough-guy front and the extreme delicacy and gentle cast of his behavior. What other actor, when his brother draws a pistol to force him to do something shameful, would put his hand on the gun and push it away with the gentleness of a caress? Who else could read "Oh, Charlie!" in a tone of reproach that is so loving and so melancholy and suggests the terrific depth of pain? ... If there is a better performance by a man in the history of film in America, I don't know what it is.

Upon its release, On the Waterfront received glowing reviews from critics and was a commercial success, earning an estimated $4.2 million in rentals at the North American box office in 1954. In his July 29, 1954, review, The New York Times critic A. H. Weiler praised the film, calling it "an uncommonly powerful, exciting, and imaginative use of the screen by gifted professionals." Film critic Roger Ebert lauded the film retrospectively, stating that Brando and Kazan changed acting in American films forever and adding it to his "Great Movies" list. In his autobiography, Brando was typically dismissive of his performance: "On the day Gadg showed me the complete picture, I was so depressed by my performance I got up and left the screening room ... I thought I was a huge failure." After Brando won the Academy Award for Best Actor, the statue was stolen. Much later, it turned up at a London auction house, which contacted the actor and informed him of its whereabouts.

=== 1954–1959: Box office success ===
Brando was in the film adaptation of the musical Guys and Dolls (1955). Guys and Dolls would be Brando's first and last musical role. Time found the picture "false to the original in its feeling", remarking that Brando "sings in a faraway tenor that sometimes tends to be flat". Appearing in Edward Murrow's Person to Person interview in early 1955, he admitted to having problems with his singing voice, which he called "pretty terrible". In the 1965 documentary Meet Marlon Brando, he revealed that the final product heard in the movie was a result of countless singing takes being cut into one and later joked, "I couldn't hit a note with a baseball bat; some notes I missed by extraordinary margins ... They sewed my words together on one song so tightly that when I mouthed it in front of the camera, I nearly asphyxiated myself". Relations between Brando and costar Frank Sinatra were also frosty, with Stefan Kanfer observing: "The two men were diametrical opposites: Marlon required multiple takes; Frank detested repeating himself." Upon their first meeting Sinatra reportedly scoffed, "Don't give me any of that Actors Studio shit." Brando later quipped, "Frank is the kind of guy, when he dies, he's going to heaven and give God a hard time for making him bald." Frank Sinatra called Brando "the world's most overrated actor", and referred to him as "mumbles". The film was commercially though not critically successful, costing $5.5 million to make and grossing $13 million.

Brando played Sakini, a Japanese interpreter for the U.S. Army in postwar Japan, in The Teahouse of the August Moon (1956). Pauline Kael was not particularly impressed by the movie, but noted "Marlon Brando starved himself to play the pixie interpreter Sakini, and he looks as if he's enjoying the stunt—talking with a mad accent, grinning boyishly, bending forward, and doing tricky movements with his legs. He's harmlessly genial (and he is certainly missed when he's offscreen), though the fey, roguish role doesn't allow him to do what he's great at and it's possible that he's less effective in it than a lesser actor might have been."

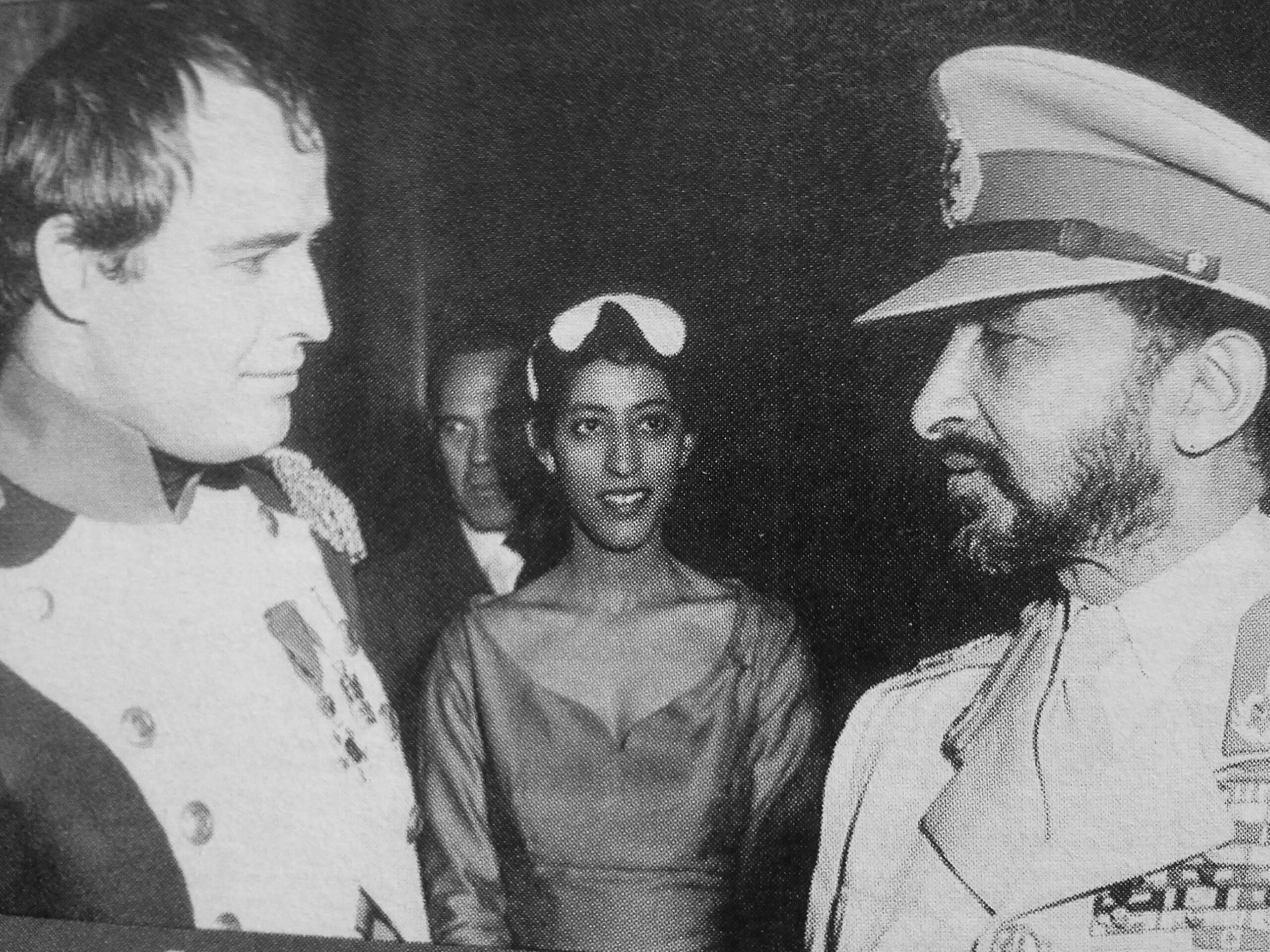
Ethiopian Emperor Haile Selassie I with Brando in the film set of Désirée, (behind) Princess Seble Desta

In Sayonara (1957), Brando appeared as a United States Air Force officer. Newsweek found the film a "dull tale of the meeting of the twain", but it was nevertheless a box-office success. According to Stefan Kanfer's biography of the actor, Brando's manager Jay Kanter negotiated a profitable contract with ten percent of the gross going to Brando, which put him in the millionaire category. The movie was controversial due to openly discussing interracial marriage, but proved a great success, earning 10 Academy Award nominations, with Brando being nominated for Best Actor. The film went on to win four Academy Awards. Teahouse and Sayonara were the first in a string of films Brando would strive to make over the next decade which contained socially relevant messages, and he formed a partnership with Paramount to establish his own production company called Pennebaker, its declared purpose to develop films that contained "social value that would improve the world." The name was a tribute in honor of his mother, who had died in 1954. By all accounts, Brando was devastated by her death, with biographer Peter Manso telling A&E's Biography, "She was the one who could give him approval like no one else could and, after his mother died, it seems that Marlon stops caring." Brando appointed his father to run Pennebaker. In the same A&E special, George Englund claims that Brando gave his father the job because "it gave Marlon a chance to take shots at him, to demean and diminish him".

In 1958, Brando appeared in The Young Lions, dyeing his hair blonde and assuming a German accent for the role, which he later admitted was not convincing. The film is based on the novel by Irwin Shaw, and Brando's portrayal of the character Christian Diestl was controversial for its time. He later wrote, "The original script closely followed the book, in which Shaw painted all Germans as evil caricatures, especially Christian, whom he portrayed as a symbol of everything that was bad about Nazism; he was mean, nasty, vicious, a cliché of evil ... I thought the story should demonstrate that there are no inherently 'bad' people in the world, but they can easily be misled." Shaw and Brando even appeared together for a televised interview with CBS correspondent David Schoenbrun and, during a bombastic exchange, Shaw charged that, like most actors, Brando was incapable of playing flat-out villainy; Brando responded by stating "Nobody creates a character but an actor. I play the role; now he exists. He is my creation." The Young Lions also features Brando's only appearance in a film with friend and rival Montgomery Clift (although they shared no scenes together). Brando closed out the decade by appearing in The Fugitive Kind (1960) opposite Anna Magnani. The film was based on another play by Tennessee Williams but was hardly the success A Streetcar Named Desire had been, with the Los Angeles Times labeling Williams' personae "psychologically sick or just plain ugly" and The New Yorker calling it a "cornpone melodrama".

=== 1961–1971: Established actor ===
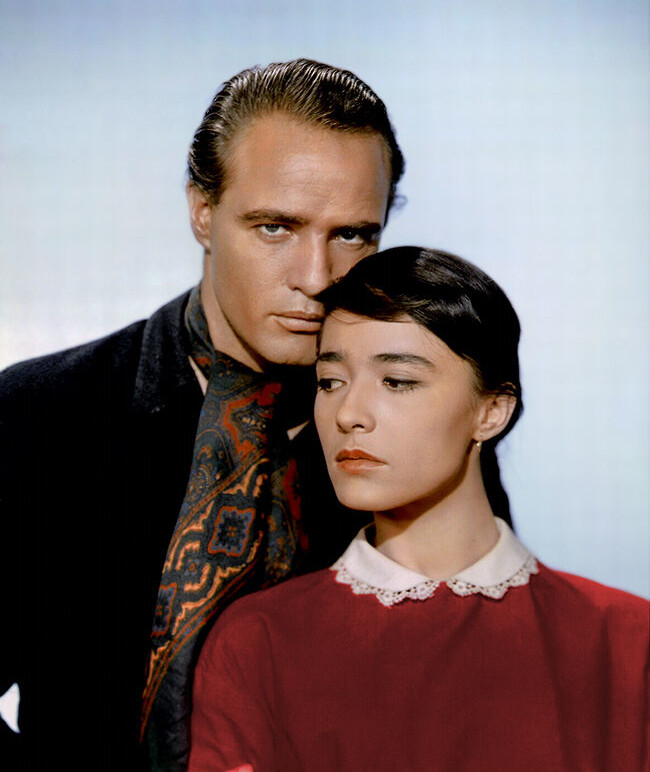
Brando with Pina Pellicer in a publicity photograph for One-Eyed Jacks (1961).

In 1961, Brando made his directorial debut in the western One-Eyed Jacks. The picture was originally directed by Stanley Kubrick, but he was fired early in the production. Paramount then made Brando the director. Brando portrays the lead character Rio, and Karl Malden plays his partner "Dad" Longworth. The supporting cast features Katy Jurado, Ben Johnson, and Slim Pickens. Brando's penchant for multiple retakes and character exploration as an actor carried over into his directing, however, and the film soon went over budget; Paramount expected the film to take three months to complete, but shooting stretched to six and the cost doubled to more than six million dollars. Brando's inexperience as an editor also delayed postproduction and Paramount eventually took control of the film. Brando later wrote, "Paramount said it didn't like my version of the story; I'd had everyone lie except Karl Malden. The studio cut the movie to pieces and made him a liar, too. By then, I was bored with the whole project and walked away from it". One-Eyed Jacks was received with mixed reviews by critics.

Brando's revulsion with the film industry reportedly boiled over on the set of his next film, Metro-Goldwyn-Mayer's remake of Mutiny on the Bounty, which was filmed in Tahiti. The actor was accused of deliberately sabotaging nearly every aspect of the production. On June 16, 1962, The Saturday Evening Post ran an article by Bill Davidson with the headline "Six million dollars down the drain: the mutiny of Marlon Brando". Mutiny director Lewis Milestone claimed that the executives "deserve what they get when they give a ham actor, a petulant child, complete control over an expensive picture." Mutiny on the Bounty nearly capsized MGM and, while the project had indeed been hampered with delays other than Brando's behavior, the accusations would dog the actor for years as studios began to fear Brando's difficult reputation. Critics also began taking note of his fluctuating weight.

Distracted by his personal life and becoming disillusioned with his career, Brando began to view acting as a means to a financial end. Critics protested when he started accepting roles in films many perceived as being beneath his talent, or criticized him for failing to live up to the better roles. Previously only signing short-term deals with film studios, in 1961 Brando uncharacteristically signed a five-picture deal with Universal Studios that would haunt him for the rest of the decade. The Ugly American (1963) was the first of these films. Based on the 1958 novel of the same title that Pennebaker had optioned, the film, which featured Brando's sister Jocelyn, was rated fairly positively but died at the box office. Brando was nominated for a Golden Globe for his performance. All of Brando's other Universal films during this period, including Bedtime Story (1964), The Appaloosa (1966), A Countess from Hong Kong (1967) and The Night of the Following Day (1969), were also critical and commercial flops. Countess in particular was a disappointment for Brando, who had looked forward to working with one of his heroes, director Charlie Chaplin. The experience turned out to be an unhappy one; Brando was horrified at Chaplin's didactic style of direction and his authoritarian approach. Brando had also appeared in the spy thriller Morituri in 1965; that, too, failed to attract an audience.

Brando acknowledged his professional decline, writing later, "Some of the films I made during the sixties were successful; some weren't. Some, like The Night of the Following Day, I made only for the money; others, like Candy, I did because a friend asked me to and I didn't want to turn him down ... In some ways I think of my middle age as the Fuck You Years." Candy was especially appalling for many; a 1968 sex farce film directed by Christian Marquand and based on the 1958 novel by Terry Southern, the film satirizes pornographic stories through the adventures of its naive heroine, Candy, played by Ewa Aulin. It is generally regarded as the nadir of Brando's career. The Washington Post observed: "Brando's self-indulgence over a dozen years is costing him and his public his talents." In the March 1966 issue of The Atlantic, Pauline Kael wrote that in his rebellious days, Brando "was antisocial because he knew society was crap; he was a hero to youth because he was strong enough not to take the crap", but now Brando and others like him had become "buffoons, shamelessly, pathetically mocking their public reputations." In an earlier review of The Appaloosa in 1966, Kael wrote that the actor was "trapped in another dog of a movie ... Not for the first time, Mr. Brando gives us a heavy-lidded, adenoidally openmouthed caricature of the inarticulate, stalwart loner." Although he feigned indifference, Brando was hurt by the critical mauling, admitting in the 2015 film Listen to Me Marlon, "They can hit you every day and you have no way of fighting back. I was very convincing in my pose of indifference, but I was very sensitive and it hurt a lot."

Brando portrayed a repressed gay army officer in Reflections in a Golden Eye, directed by John Huston and co-starring Elizabeth Taylor. The role turned out as one of his most acclaimed in years, with Stanley Crouch marveling, "Brando's main achievement was to portray the taciturn but stoic gloom of those pulverized by circumstances." The film overall received mixed reviews. Another notable film was The Chase (1966), which paired the actor with director Arthur Penn, Jane Fonda, Robert Redford and Robert Duvall. The film deals with themes of racism, sexual revolution, small-town corruption, and vigilantism. The film was received mostly positively.

Brando cited Burn! (1969) as his personal favorite of the films he had made, writing in his autobiography: "I think I did some of the best acting I've ever done in that picture, but few people came to see it." Brando dedicated a full chapter to the film in his memoir, stating that the director, Gillo Pontecorvo, was the best director he had ever worked with next to Kazan and Bernardo Bertolucci. Brando also detailed his clashes with Pontecorvo on the set and how "we nearly killed each other." Loosely based on events in the history of Guadeloupe, the film got a hostile reception from critics. In 1971, Michael Winner directed him in the British horror film The Nightcomers with Stephanie Beacham, Thora Hird, Harry Andrews and Anna Palk. It is a prequel to The Turn of the Screw, which had previously been filmed as The Innocents (1961). Brando's performance earned him a nomination for a Best Actor BAFTA, but the film bombed at the box office.

=== 1970–1979: Career resurgence and acclaim ===
During the 1970s, Brando was considered "unbankable". Critics were becoming increasingly dismissive of his work and he had not appeared in a box office hit since The Young Lions in 1958, the last year he had ranked as one of the Top Ten Box Office Stars and the year of his last Academy Award nomination, for Sayonara. Brando's performance as Vito Corleone, the "Don", in The Godfather (1972), Francis Ford Coppola's adaptation of Mario Puzo's 1969 bestselling novel of the same name, was a career turning point, putting him back in the Top Ten and winning him his second Best Actor Oscar.

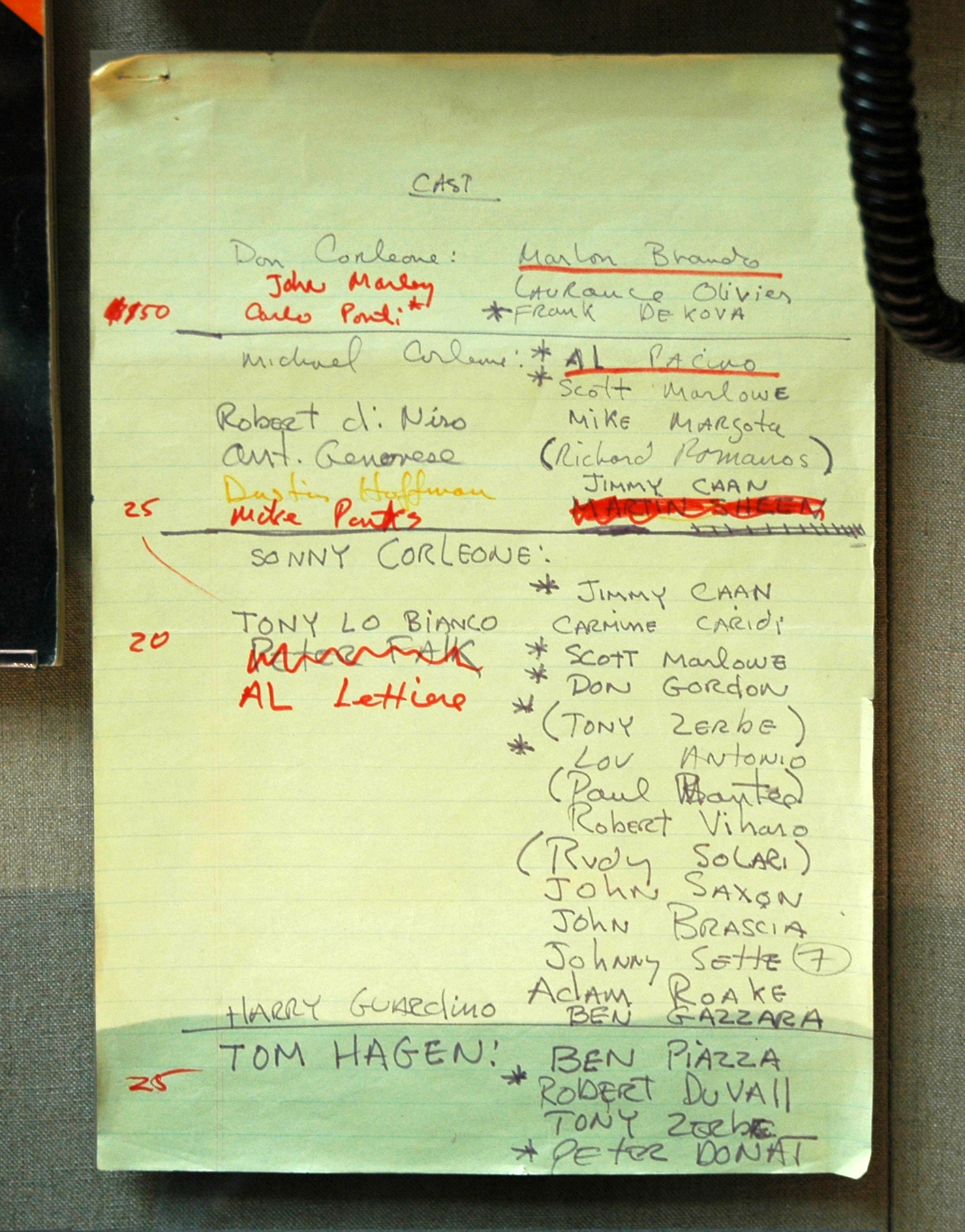
Francis Ford Coppola's handwritten casting notes for The Godfather, showing Brando as a favorite for the role of Don Vito Corleone.

Paramount production chief Robert Evans, who had given Puzo an advance to write The Godfather so that Paramount would own the film rights, hired Coppola after many major directors had turned the film down. Evans wanted an Italian-American director who could provide the film with cultural authenticity. Coppola also came cheap. Evans was conscious of the fact that Paramount's last Mafia film, The Brotherhood (1968) had been a box office bomb, and he believed it was partly due to the fact that the director, Martin Ritt, and the star, Kirk Douglas, were Jewish, and the film lacked an authentic Italian flavor. The studio originally intended the film to be a low-budget production set in contemporary times without any major actors, but the phenomenal success of the novel gave Evans the clout to turn The Godfather into a prestige picture.

Coppola had developed a list of actors for all the roles, and his list of potential Dons included the Oscar-winning Italian-American Ernest Borgnine, the Italian-American Frank de Kova (best known for playing Chief Wild Eagle on the TV sitcom F-Troop), John Marley (a Best Supporting Oscar-nominee for Paramount's 1970 hit film Love Story who was cast as the film producer Jack Woltz in the picture), the Italian-American Richard Conte (who was cast as Don Corleone's deadly rival Don Emilio Barzini), and Italian film producer Carlo Ponti. Coppola admitted in a 1975 interview, "We finally figured we had to lure the best actor in the world. It was that simple. That boiled down to Laurence Olivier or Marlon Brando, who are the greatest actors in the world." Coppola's hand-written cast list has Brando's name underlined.

Evans told Coppola that he had been thinking of Brando for the part two years earlier, and Puzo had imagined Brando in the part when he wrote the novel and had actually written to him about the part, so Coppola and Evans narrowed it down to Brando. (Coincidentally, Olivier would compete with Brando for the Best Actor Oscar for his part in Sleuth. He bested Brando at the 1972 New York Film Critics Circle Awards.) Albert S. Ruddy, whom Paramount assigned to produce the film, agreed with the choice of Brando. However, Paramount studio executives were opposed to casting Brando, due to his reputation for difficulty and his long string of box office flops. Brando also had One-Eyed Jacks working against him, a troubled production that lost money for Paramount when it was released in 1961. Paramount Pictures President Stanley Jaffe told an exasperated Coppola "As long as I'm president of this studio, Marlon Brando will not be in this picture, and I will no longer allow you to discuss it."

Jaffe eventually set three conditions for the casting of Brando: That he would have to take a fee far below what he typically received; he would have to agree to accept financial responsibility for any production delays his behavior cost; and he had to submit to a screen test. Coppola convinced Brando to do a videotaped "make-up" test, in which Brando did his own makeup (he used cotton balls to simulate the character's puffed cheeks). Coppola had feared Brando might be too young to play the Don, but was electrified by the actor's characterization as the head of a crime family. Even so, he had to fight the studio in order to cast the temperamental actor. Brando had doubts himself, stating in his autobiography, "I had never played an Italian before, and I didn't think I could do it successfully." Eventually, Charles Bluhdorn, the president of Paramount parent Gulf+Western, was won over to letting Brando have the role; when he saw the screen test, he asked in amazement, "What are we watching? Who is this old guinea?" Brando was signed for a low fee of $50,000, but in his contract, he was given a percentage of the gross on a sliding scale: 1% of the gross for each $10 million over a $10 million threshold, up to 5% if the picture exceeded $60 million. According to Evans, Brando sold back his points in the picture for $100,000 because he was in dire need of funds. "That $100,000 cost him $11 million," Evans claimed.

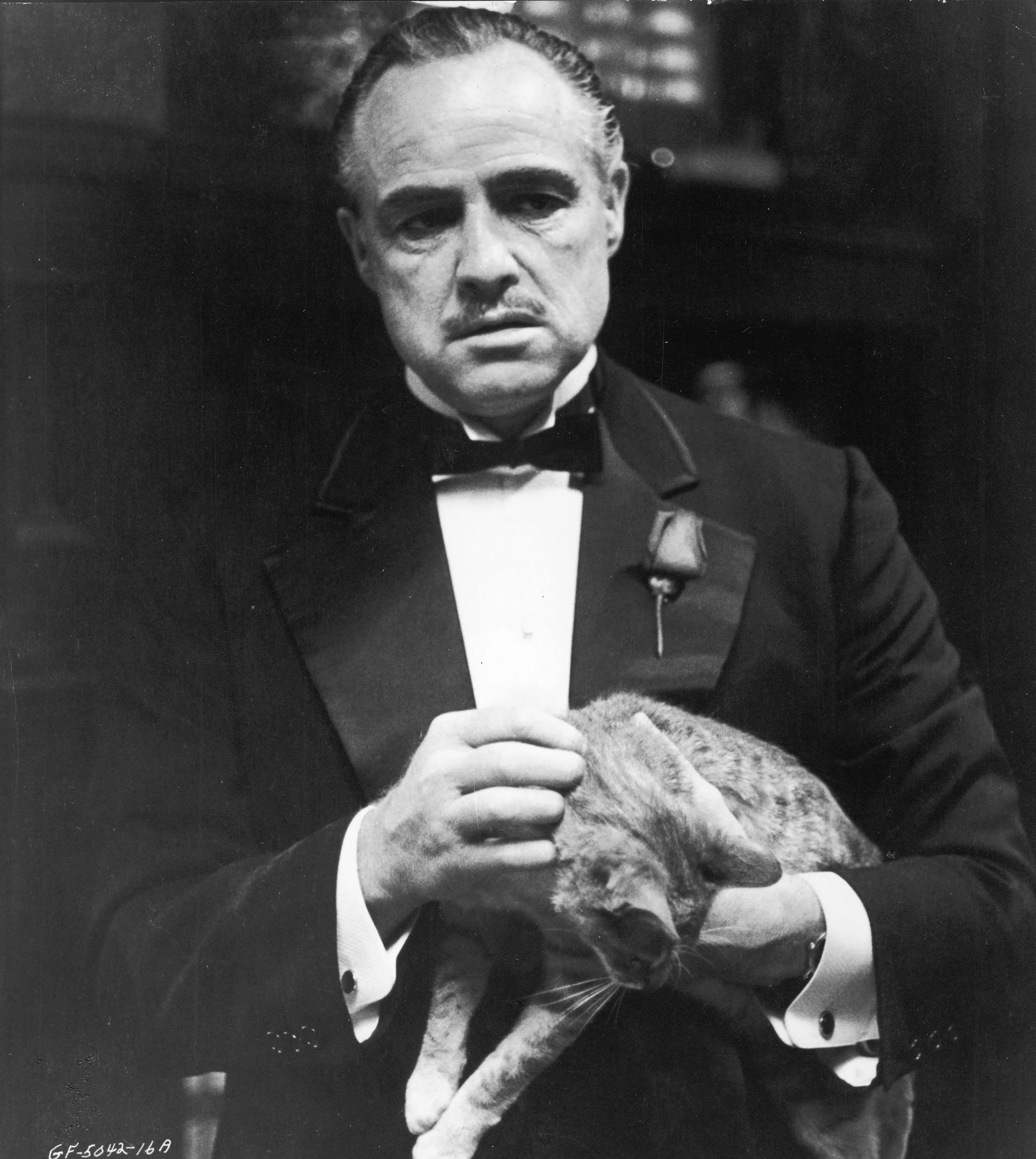
Brando as Vito Corleone in The Godfather

Brando was on his best behavior during filming, buoyed by a cast that included rising stars Al Pacino, Robert Duvall, James Caan, and Diane Keaton. As the most seasoned actor on set, he wielded his influence to support the creatives on the project, serving as the "head of the family" much like his role in the film. In a 1994 interview, Coppola insisted The Godfather was "a very unappreciated movie when we were making it. They were very unhappy with it. They didn't like the cast. They didn't like the way I was shooting it. I was always on the verge of getting fired." When word of this executive interference reached Brando, he threatened to walk off the picture, writing in his memoir: "I strongly believe that directors are entitled to independence and freedom to realize their vision." Similarly, in a 2010 interview, Al Pacino discussed how Brando's support helped him keep the role of Michael Corleone in the movie, despite the fact Coppola wanted to fire him due to pressure from studio executives who were puzzled by Pacino's performance.

Brando's performance was glowingly reviewed by critics. "I thought it would be interesting to play a gangster, maybe for the first time in the movies, who wasn't like those bad guys Edward G. Robinson played, but who is kind of a hero, a man to be respected," Brando recalled in his autobiography. "Also, because he had so much power and unquestioned authority, I thought it would be an interesting contrast to play him as a gentle man, unlike Al Capone, who beat up people with baseball bats." Duvall later marveled to A&E's Biography, "He minimized the sense of beginning. In other words he, like, deemphasized the word action. He would go in front of that camera just like he was before. Cut! It was all the same. There was really no beginning. I learned a lot from watching that." Brando won the Academy Award for Best Actor for his performance, but he declined it, becoming the second actor to refuse a Best Actor award (after George C. Scott for Patton). Brando did not attend the award ceremony; instead, he sent actress Sacheen Littlefeather (who appeared in Plains Indian-style regalia) to decline the Oscar on his behalf. After refusing to touch the statue at the podium, she announced to the crowd that Brando was rejecting the award in protest of "the treatment of American Indians today by the film industry ... and on television and movie reruns and also with recent happenings at Wounded Knee." The Wounded Knee Occupation of 1973 was occurring at the time of the ceremony. Brando had written a longer speech for her to read but, as she explained, this was not permitted due to time constraints. In the written speech Brando added that he hoped his declining the Oscar would be seen as "an earnest effort to focus attention on an issue that might very well determine whether or not this country has the right to say from this point forward we believe in the inalienable rights of all people to remain free and independent on lands that have supported their life beyond living memory."

The actor followed The Godfather with Bernardo Bertolucci's 1972 film Last Tango in Paris, playing opposite Maria Schneider, but Brando's highly noted performance threatened to be overshadowed by an uproar over the sexual content of the film. Brando portrays a recent American widower named Paul, who begins an anonymous sexual relationship with a young, betrothed Parisian woman named Jeanne. As with previous films, Brando refused to memorize his lines for many scenes; instead, he wrote his lines on cue cards and posted them around the set for easy reference, leaving Bertolucci with the problem of keeping them out of the picture frame. The film features several intense, graphic scenes involving Brando, including Paul anally raping Jeanne using butter as a lubricant, which it was alleged was not consensual. The actress confirmed that no actual sex occurred, but she complained that she was not told what the scene would include until shortly prior to filming.

Bertolucci also shot a scene which showed Brando's genitals, but in 1973 explained, "I had so identified myself with Brando that I cut it out of shame for myself. To show him naked would have been like showing me naked." Schneider declared in an interview that "Marlon said he felt raped and manipulated by it and he was 48. And he was Marlon Brando!". Like Schneider, Brando confirmed that the sex was simulated. Bertolucci said about Brando that he was "a monster as an actor and a darling as a human being". Brando refused to speak to Bertolucci for 15 years after the production was completed. Bertolucci said:

I was thinking that it was like a dialogue where he was really answering my questions in a way. When at the end of the movie, when he saw it, I discovered that he realized what we were doing, that he was delivering so much of his own experience. And he was very upset with me, and I told him, "Listen, you are a grown-up. Older than me. Didn't you realize what you were doing?" And he didn't talk to me for years.

However; "I called him one day in '93, I think, I was in LA and my wife was shooting a movie. First of all, he answered the phone, and he was talking to me like we had seen each other a day earlier. He said, "Come here." I said, "When?" He said, "Now." So I remember driving on Mulholland Drive to his home and thinking I think I won't make it, I think I will crash before [I get there]. I was so emotional." The film also features Paul's angry, emotionally charged final confrontation with the corpse of his dead wife. The controversial movie was a hit however, and Brando made the list of Top Ten Box Office Stars for the last time. His gross participation deal earned him $3 million. The voting membership of the Academy of Motion Picture Arts & Sciences again nominated Brando for Best Actor, his seventh nomination. Brando won the 1973 New York Film Critics Circle Award for Best Actor.

Pauline Kael, in The New Yorker review, wrote "The movie breakthrough has finally come. Bertolucci and Brando have altered the face of an art form." Brando confessed in his autobiography, "To this day I can't say what Last Tango in Paris was about", and added the film "required me to do a lot of emotional arm wrestling with myself, and when it was finished, I decided that I wasn't ever again going to destroy myself emotionally to make a movie". In 1973, Brando was devastated by the death of his childhood best friend Wally Cox. Brando wrenched his ashes from his widow, who was going to sue for their return, but finally said, "Marlon needed the ashes more than I did."

In 1976, Brando appeared in The Missouri Breaks with his friend Jack Nicholson. The movie also reunited the actor with director Arthur Penn. As biographer Stefan Kanfer describes, Penn had difficulty controlling Brando, who seemed intent on going over the top with his border-ruffian-turned-contract-killer Robert E. Lee Clayton: "Marlon made him a cross-dressing psychopath. Absent for the first hour of the movie, Clayton enters on horseback, dangling upside down, caparisoned in white buckskin, Littlefeather-style. He speaks in an Irish accent for no apparent reason. Over the next hour, also for no apparent reason, Clayton assumes the intonation of a British upper-class twit and an elderly frontier woman, complete with a granny dress and matching bonnet. Penn, who believed in letting actors do their thing, indulged Marlon all the way." Critics were unkind, with The Observer calling Brando's performance "one of the most extravagant displays of grandedamerie since Sarah Bernhardt", while The Sun complained, "Marlon Brando at fifty-two has the sloppy belly of a sixty-two-year-old, the white hair of a seventy-two-year-old, and the lack of discipline of a precocious twelve-year-old." However, Kanfer noted: "Even though his late work was met with disapproval, a re-examination shows that often, in the middle of the most pedestrian scene, there would be a sudden, luminous occurrence, a flash of the old Marlon that showed how capable he remained."

In 1978, Brando narrated the English version of Raoni, a French-Belgian documentary film directed by Jean-Pierre Dutilleux and Luiz Carlos Saldanha that focused on the life of Raoni Metuktire and issues surrounding the survival of the Indigenous tribes in north central Brazil. Brando portrayed Superman's father Jor-El in the 1978 film Superman. He agreed to the role only on assurance that he would be paid a large sum for what amounted to a small part, that he would not have to read the script beforehand, and that his lines would be displayed somewhere off-camera. It was revealed in a documentary contained in the 2001 DVD release of Superman that he was paid $3.7 million for two weeks of work. Brando also filmed scenes for the movie's sequel, Superman II, but after producers refused to pay him the same percentage he received for the first movie, he denied them permission to use the footage. "I asked for my usual percentage," he recollected in his memoir, "but they refused, and so did I." However, after Brando's death, the footage was reincorporated into the 2006 recut of the film, Superman II: The Richard Donner Cut and in the 2006 "loose sequel" Superman Returns, in which both used and unused archive footage of him as Jor-El from the first two Superman films was remastered for a scene in the Fortress of Solitude, and Brando's voice-overs were used throughout the film. In 1979, he made a rare television appearance in the miniseries Roots: The Next Generations, portraying George Lincoln Rockwell; he won a Primetime Emmy Award for Outstanding Supporting Actor in a Miniseries or a Movie for his performance.

Brando starred as Colonel Walter E. Kurtz in Francis Ford Coppola's Vietnam epic Apocalypse Now (1979). He plays a highly decorated U.S. Army Special Forces officer who goes renegade, running his own operation based in Cambodia and is feared by the U.S. military as much as the Vietnamese. Brando was paid $1 million a week for 3 weeks work. The film drew attention for its lengthy and troubled production, as Eleanor Coppola's documentary Hearts of Darkness: A Filmmaker's Apocalypse details: Brando showed up on the set overweight, Martin Sheen suffered a heart attack, and severe weather destroyed several expensive sets. The film's release was also postponed several times while Coppola edited millions of feet of footage. In the documentary, Coppola talks about how astonished he was when an overweight Brando turned up for his scenes and, feeling desperate, decided to portray Kurtz, who appears emaciated in the original story, as a man who had indulged every aspect of himself, with Coppola commentating that "He was already heavy when I hired him and he promised me that he was going to get in shape and I imagined that I would, if he were heavy, I could use that. But he was so fat, he was very, very shy about it ... He was very, very adamant about how he didn't want to portray himself that way." Brando admitted to Coppola that he had not read the book, Heart of Darkness, as the director had asked him to, and the pair spent days exploring the story and the character of Kurtz, much to the actor's financial benefit, according to producer Fred Roos: "The clock was ticking on this deal he had and we had to finish him within three weeks or we'd go into this very expensive overage ... And Francis and Marlon would be talking about the character and whole days would go by. And this is at Marlon's urging—and yet he's getting paid for it."

Upon release, Apocalypse Now earned critical acclaim, as did Brando's performance. His whispering of Kurtz's final words "The horror! The horror!", has become particularly famous. Roger Ebert, writing in the Chicago Sun-Times, defended the movie's controversial denouement, opining that the ending, "with Brando's fuzzy, brooding monologues and the final violence, feels much more satisfactory than any conventional ending possibly could." Brando received a fee of $2 million plus 10% of the gross theatrical rental and 10% of the TV sale rights, earning him around $9 million.

=== 1980–2001: Later work and final roles ===
After appearing as oil tycoon Adam Steiffel in 1980's The Formula, which was poorly received critically, Brando announced his retirement from acting. However, he returned in 1989 in A Dry White Season, based on André Brink's 1979 anti-apartheid novel. Brando agreed to do the film for free, but fell out with director Euzhan Palcy over how the film was edited; he even made a rare television appearance in an interview with Connie Chung to voice his disapproval. In his memoir, he maintained that Palcy "had cut the picture so poorly, I thought, that the inherent drama of this conflict was vague at best." Brando received praise for his performance, earning an Academy Award nomination for Best Supporting Actor and winning the Best Actor Award at the Tokyo Film Festival.

Brando scored enthusiastic reviews for his caricature of his Vito Corleone role as Carmine Sabatini in 1990's The Freshman. In his original review, Roger Ebert wrote, "There have been a lot of movies where stars have repeated the triumphs of their parts—but has any star ever done it more triumphantly than Marlon Brando does in The Freshman?" Variety also praised Brando's performance as Sabatini and noted, "Marlon Brando's sublime comedy performance elevates The Freshman from screwball comedy to a quirky niche in film history." Brando starred alongside his friend Johnny Depp on the box office hit Don Juan DeMarco (1995), in which he also shared credits with singer Selena in her only filming appearance, and in Depp's controversial The Brave (1997), which was never released in the United States.

Later performances, such as his appearance in Christopher Columbus: The Discovery (1992) (for which he was nominated for a Raspberry as "Worst Supporting Actor"), The Island of Dr. Moreau (in which he won a "Worst Supporting Actor" Raspberry) (1996), and his barely recognizable appearance in Free Money (1998), resulted in some of the worst reviews of his career. The Island of Dr. Moreau screenwriter Ron Hutchinson would later say in his memoir, Clinging to the Iceberg: Writing for a Living on the Stage and in Hollywood (2017), that Brando sabotaged the film's production by feuding and refusing to cooperate with his colleagues and the film crew.

Unlike its immediate predecessors, Brando's last completed film, The Score (2001), was received generally positively. In the film, in which he portrays a fence, he starred with Robert De Niro. After Brando's death, the novel Fan-Tan was released. Brando conceived the novel with director Donald Cammell in 1979, but it was not released until 2005.

== Personal life ==
Brando was known for his tumultuous personal life, his poor treatment of women, and his large number of partners and children. He was the father of at least 11 children, three of whom were adopted. Brando was openly bisexual. In 1976, he told a French journalist, "Homosexuality is so much in fashion, it no longer makes news. Like a large number of men, I, too, have had homosexual experiences, and I am not ashamed. I have never paid much attention to what people think about me. But if there is someone who is convinced that Jack Nicholson and I are lovers, may they continue to do so. I find it amusing."

During the 1947 production of A Streetcar Named Desire, Brando became enamored with fellow cast member Sandy Campbell, who played the minor role of the young collector. Brando had asked Campbell to have an affair with him, and was often seen standing in the wings with Campbell, holding his hand. According to Truman Capote, both Campbell and Brando confessed to having been in a sexual relationship. "I asked Marlon, and he admitted it. He said he went to bed with lots of other men, too, but that he didn't consider himself a homosexual. He said they were all so attracted to him. 'I just thought that I was doing them a favor,' he said." In his 1957 interview with Brando for The New Yorker, Capote claimed to have first encountered Brando at a rehearsal for A Streetcar Named Desire while Brando was sleeping on a table on the stage in an empty auditorium. However, the story was appropriated from Sandy Campbell, as confirmed by Campbell's partner, Donald Windham.

In Songs My Mother Taught Me, Brando wrote that he met Marilyn Monroe at a party where she played piano, unnoticed by anybody else there, that they had an affair and maintained an intermittent relationship until her death in 1962, and that he received a telephone call from her two or three days before she died. He also claimed numerous other romances, although he did not discuss his marriages, his wives, or his children in his autobiography.

He met nisei actress and dancer Reiko Sato in the early 1950s. Though their relationship cooled, they remained friends for the rest of Sato's life, with Sato dividing her time between Los Angeles and Tetiʻaroa in her later years.

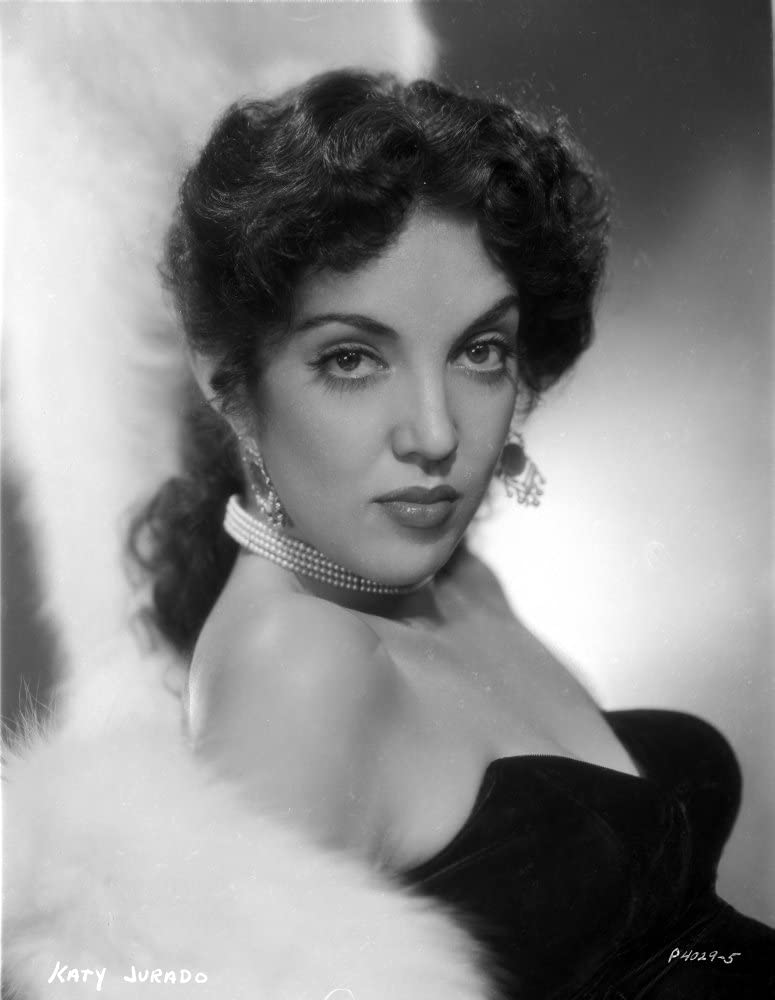
Katy Jurado in 1953

Brando was smitten with the Mexican actress Katy Jurado after seeing her in High Noon. They met when Brando was filming Viva Zapata! in Mexico. Brando told Joseph L. Mankiewicz that he was attracted to "her enigmatic eyes, black as hell, pointing at you like fiery arrows". Their first date became the beginning of an extended affair that lasted many years and peaked at the time they worked together on One-Eyed Jacks (1961), a film directed by Brando.

Brando met actress Rita Moreno in 1954, and they began a love affair. Moreno later revealed in her memoir that when she became pregnant by Brando, he arranged for an abortion. After the abortion was botched, and Brando fell in love with French actress Tarita Teriipaia, Moreno attempted suicide by overdosing on Brando's sleeping pills. Years after they broke up, Moreno played his love interest in the film The Night of the Following Day. After their relationship, she accused Brando of significant emotional abuse and of throwing chairs in a fit of jealous rage after she revealed she had dated Elvis Presley in the past.

Brando was briefly engaged to the 19-year-old French actress Josanne Mariani, whom he met in 1954. They broke their engagement when Brando discovered that his other girlfriend, Anna Kashfi, was pregnant, and went on to marry Kashfi instead in 1957. Brando and Kashfi had a son, Christian Brando, on May 11, 1958; they divorced in 1959.

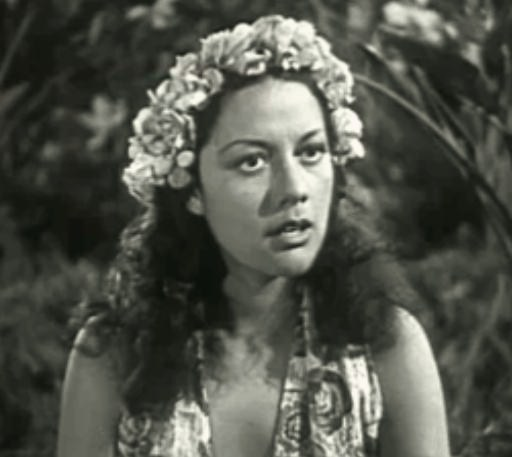
Movita Castaneda in Paradise Isle (1937)

In 1960, Brando married Movita Castaneda, a Mexican-American actress; the marriage was annulled in 1968, after it was discovered she was still legally married to her first husband Jack Doyle. Castaneda had appeared in the first Mutiny on the Bounty film in 1935, 27 years before the 1962 remake with Brando as Fletcher Christian. They had two children together: Miko Castaneda Brando (born 1961) and Rebecca Brando (born 1966).

In the 1960s and early 1970s, Tarita Teriipaia, who played Brando's love interest in Mutiny on the Bounty, was his long-term partner. She was twenty years old, 18 years younger than Brando, who was reportedly delighted by her naïveté. Teriipaia and Brando did not marry, with Teriipaia commenting on the topic of potentially marrying Brando in a 1970 interview. Because Teriipaia was a native French speaker, Brando became fluent in the language and gave numerous interviews in French. Brando and Teriipaia had two children together: Simon Teihotu Brando (born 1963) and Tarita Cheyenne Brando (1970–1995). Brando also adopted Teriipaia's daughter, Maimiti Brando (born 1977), and niece, Raiatua Brando (born 1982).

After Brando's death, the daughter of actress Cynthia Lynn claimed that Brando had a short-lived affair with her mother, who appeared with Brando in Bedtime Story, and that this affair resulted in her birth in 1964. Throughout the late 1960s and into the early 1980s, he had a tempestuous, long-term relationship with actress Jill Banner.

Brando had a long-term relationship with his housekeeper, Maria Cristina Ruiz, with whom he had three children: Ninna Priscilla Brando (born May 13, 1989), Myles Jonathan Brando (born January 16, 1992), and Timothy Gahan Brando (born January 6, 1994). Brando also adopted Petra Brando-Corval (born 1972), the daughter of his assistant Caroline Barrett and novelist James Clavell.

Brando's close friendship with Wally Cox was the subject of rumors. Brando told a journalist: "If Wally had been a woman, I would have married him and we would have lived happily ever after." Writer-editor Beauregard Houston-Montgomery said that while under the influence of marijuana, Brando told him that Cox had been the love of his life. Milagros Tirado "Millie" Beck, Cox's second wife, and Patricia Cox Shapiro, Cox's third wife, dismissed the suggestion that the love was more than platonic. After Cox died in 1973, Brando turned to Cox's widow, Shapiro, and pleaded for permission to scatter Cox's ashes at the hiking spots they had once frequented together, and she agreed. However, 20 years later, to her dismay, she discovered that Brando had kept the ashes nearby instead of scattering them. Following Brando's death, in accordance with his wishes, his family scattered both men's ashes together in Death Valley, where they had often gone rock hunting.

In 2018, Quincy Jones claimed that Brando had had sexual relationships with James Baldwin, Richard Pryor and Marvin Gaye. Pryor's widow, Jennifer Lee, confirmed Pryor's relationship with Brando, but Pryor's daughter, Rain Pryor, disputed that assertion. In February 2024, actor Billy Dee Williams said Brando had propositioned him, which he rejected, while the two were at Brando's home during a party.

Brando's grandson, Tuki Brando (born 1990), son of Cheyenne Brando, is a fashion model. His numerous grandchildren also include Prudence Brando and Shane Brando, children of Miko C. Brando; the children of Rebecca Brando; and the three children of Teihotu Brando among others.

Stephen Blackehart has been reported to be the son of Brando, but Blackehart disputes this claim.

=== Lifestyle ===
Brando earned a reputation as a "bad boy" for his public outbursts and antics. According to Los Angeles: "Brando was rock and roll before anybody knew what rock and roll was." His behavior during the filming of Mutiny on the Bounty (1962) seemed to bolster his reputation as a difficult star. He was blamed for a change in director and a runaway budget, though he denied responsibility for both. On June 12, 1973, Brando broke paparazzo Ron Galella's jaw. Galella had followed Brando, who was accompanied by talk show host Dick Cavett, after a taping of The Dick Cavett Show in New York City. He paid a $40,000 out-of-court settlement and suffered an infected hand as a result. Galella wore a football helmet the next time he photographed Brando at a gala benefiting the American Indians Development Association in 1974.

The filming of Mutiny on the Bounty profoundly affected Brando, as he fell in love with Tahiti and its people. He bought a twelve-island atoll, Tetiaroa, and in 1970, hired a Los Angeles architect, Bernard Judge, to build his home and natural village there without despoiling the environment. An environmental laboratory protecting sea birds and turtles was established, and for many years student groups visited. The 1983 hurricane destroyed many of the structures, including his resort. A hotel using Brando's name, The Brando Resort opened in 2014. The hotel continues Brando's legacy by continuing with environmental practices that help support the local sea turtles and other wildlife.

For his hobbies, Brando was an active ham radio operator, with the call signs KE6PZH and FO5GJ (the latter from his island). He was listed in the Federal Communications Commission (FCC) records as Martin Brandeaux to preserve his privacy. He was also a novice conga player and even designed a new drum-tuning mechanism which he patented.

In the A&E Biography episode on Brando, biographer Peter Manso comments: "On the one hand, being a celebrity allowed Marlon to take his revenge on the world that had so deeply hurt him, so deeply scarred him. On the other hand, he hated it because he knew it was false and ephemeral." In the same program another biographer, David Thomson, says:

Many, many people who worked with him, and came to work with him with the best intentions, went away in despair saying he's a spoiled kid. It has to be done his way or he goes away with some vast story about how he was wronged, he was offended, and I think that fits with the psychological pattern that he was a wronged kid.

=== Activism ===
In 1946, Brando performed in Ben Hecht's Zionist play A Flag Is Born. He attended fundraisers for John F. Kennedy in the 1960 United States presidential election and supported Lyndon B. Johnson in the 1964 presidential election.

In the early 1960s, Brando contributed thousands of dollars to both the Southern Christian Leadership Conference (SCLC) and to a scholarship fund established for the children of slain Mississippi NAACP leader Medgar Evers. At that point, he was involved in films that carried messages about human rights: 1957's Sayonara, which addressed interracial romance, and 1963's The Ugly American, depicting the conduct of U.S. officials abroad and the deleterious effect on the citizens of foreign countries. In August 1963, he participated in the March on Washington along with fellow celebrities Harry Belafonte, James Garner, Charlton Heston, Burt Lancaster and Sidney Poitier. He also participated in the Freedom Rides along with fellow actor Paul Newman. For a time, he also donated money to the Black Panther Party and considered himself a friend of its founder, Bobby Seale. He also gave a eulogy after Black Panther Party member Bobby Hutton was shot by the police.

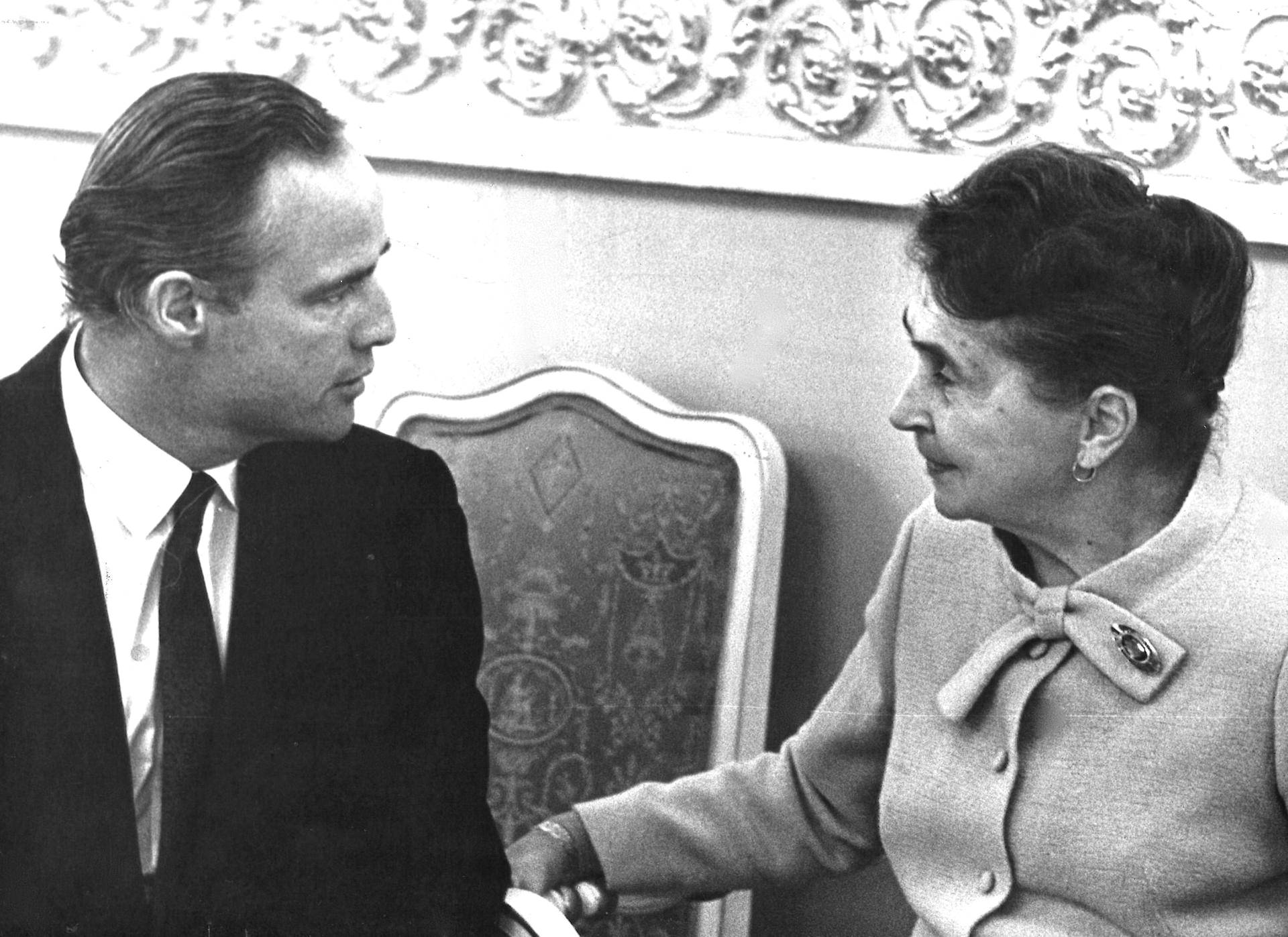
Brando with the Finnish First Lady, Sylvi Kekkonen, in 1967

In the autumn of 1967, Brando visited Helsinki, Finland, at a charity party organized by UNICEF at the Helsinki City Theatre. The gala was televised in thirteen countries. His visit was based on the famine he had seen in Bihar, India, and he presented the film he shot there to the press and invited guests. He spoke in favor of children's rights and development aid in developing countries.

In the aftermath of the 1968 assassination of Martin Luther King Jr., Brando announced that he was bowing out of the lead role of a major film, The Arrangement (1969), which was about to begin production, to devote himself to the civil rights movement. On the late-night ABC-TV talk show Joey Bishop Show, he said that "I felt I'd better go find out where it is; what it is to be black in this country; what this rage is all about." In A&E's Biography episode on Brando, actor and co-star Martin Sheen states: "I'll never forget the night that Reverend King was shot and I turned on the news and Marlon was walking through Harlem with Mayor Lindsay. And there were snipers and there was a lot of unrest and he kept walking and talking through those neighborhoods with Mayor Lindsay. It was one of the most incredible acts of courage I ever saw, and it meant a lot and did a lot."

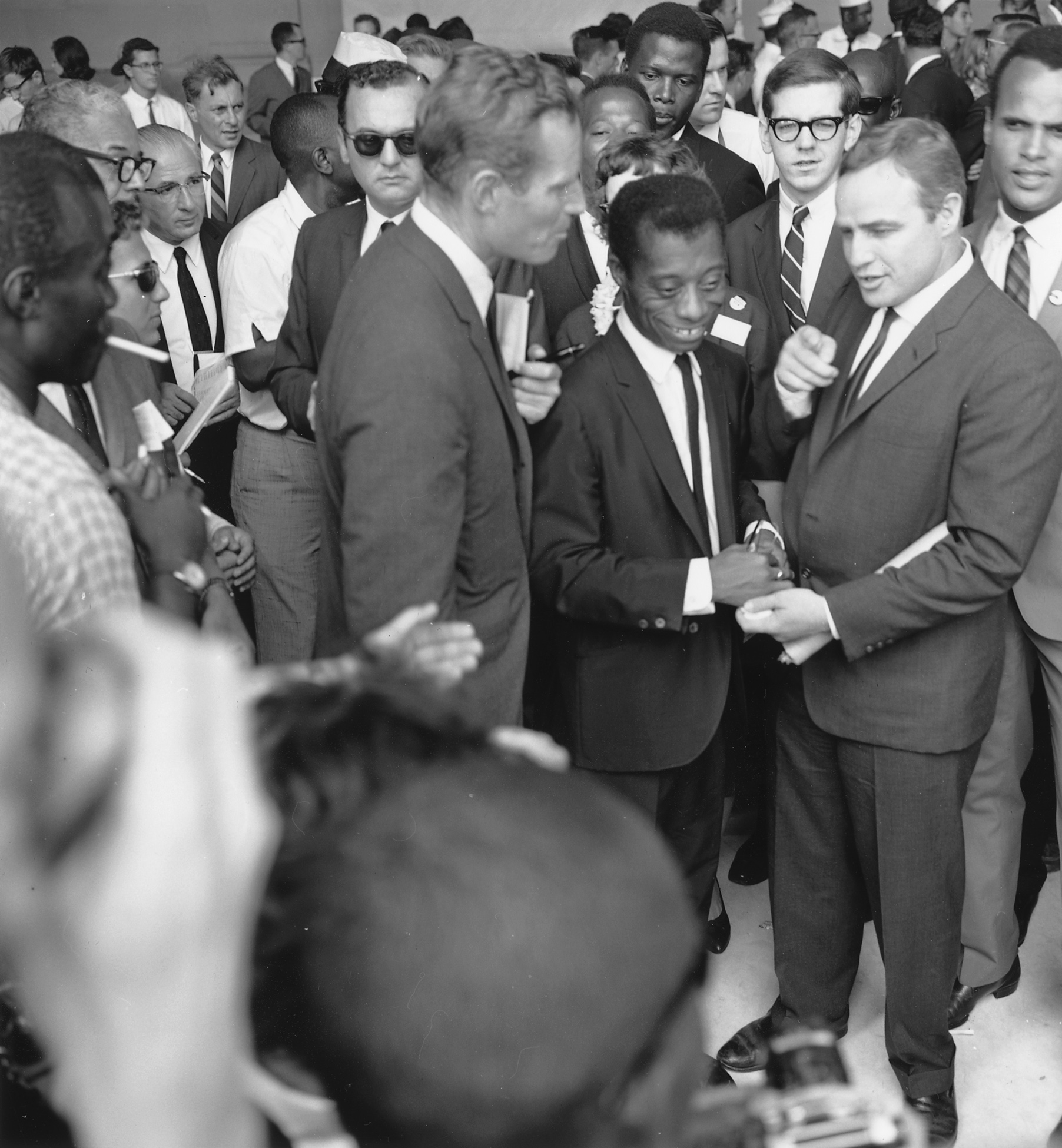
Brando (right) with Charlton Heston, James Baldwin, Sidney Poitier and Harry Belafonte at the March on Washington in 1963.

Brando was also a supporter of Native American rights and the American Indian Movement. In 1964, he was arrested at a "fish-in" protest near Tacoma, Washington, held to protest a broken treaty that had promised Native Americans fishing rights in Puget Sound. The protest won him respect from members of the Puyallup tribe, who reportedly dubbed the spot where he was arrested "Brando's Landing." At the 1973 Academy Awards ceremony, he refused to accept the Oscar for his career-reviving performance in The Godfather. Sacheen Littlefeather represented him at the ceremony. She appeared in full Apache attire and stated that, owing to the "poor treatment of Native Americans in the film industry", Brando would not accept the award. This occurred while the standoff at Wounded Knee was ongoing. The event grabbed the attention of the US and the world media. This was considered a major event and victory for the movement by its supporters and participants.

Outside of his film work, Brando appeared before the California Assembly in support of a fair housing law, and personally joined picket lines in demonstrations protesting discrimination in housing developments in 1963.

Brando was also an activist against apartheid. In 1964, he favored a boycott of his films in South Africa to prevent them from being shown to a segregated audience. He took part at a 1975 protest rally against American investments in South Africa and for the release of Nelson Mandela. In 1989, he also starred in the anti-apartheid film A Dry White Season based on André Brink's novel of the same name.

=== Last Tango in Paris controversy ===
In later years, it was acknowledged that unlike Brando and Last Tango In Paris director Bernardo Bertolucci, Brando's co-star in the film, Maria Schneider had no knowledge of the film's "butter" rape scene until just before it was shot. Brando is also acknowledged to have been the one who had the idea for the scene. Schneider had been outspoken hostile to the scene, linking it to sexual assault.

In 2001, Schneider commented:

Last Tango ... first major role. In fact, it's a total coincidence. I was friends with Dominique Sanda. She would make the film with Jean-Louis Trintignant, but she was pregnant. She had a large picture with her of both of us. Bertolucci saw it. He made me do a casting ... I regretted my choice since the beginning of my career would have been sweeter, quieter. For Tango, I was not prepared. People have identified with a character that was not me. Butter, about saucy old pigs ... Even Marlon with his charisma and class, felt a bit violated, exploited a little in this film. He rejected it for years. And me, I felt it doubly.

In 2007, she further stated that:

I should have called my agent or had my lawyer come to the set because you can't force someone to do something that isn't in the script, but at the time, I didn't know that. Marlon said to me: 'Maria, don't worry, it's just a movie,' but during the scene, even though what Marlon was doing wasn't real, I was crying real tears. I felt humiliated and to be honest, I felt a little raped, both by Marlon and by Bertolucci. After the scene, Marlon didn't console me or apologise. Thankfully, there was just one take.

In 2013, two years after Schneider's death, Bertolucci admitted to withholding information of the "butter" scene which he and Brando had firsthand knowledge of, but also alleged that he withheld the information from her in order to generate a real "reaction of frustration and rage". Brando alleged that Bertolucci had wanted the characters to have real sex, but Brando and Schneider both said it was simulated. However, actress Jessica Tovey, in an article she wrote for The Guardian, argued that Bertolucci's defense of pursuing an artistic vision was "bogus" and that what occurred was "a violation." Tovey also observed that it is difficult to imagine the "roles being reversed; Brando being brutalized only to discover midway through filming that Schneider and Bertolucci had conspired to add an element of humiliation."

=== Comments on Jews and Hollywood ===
In an interview in Playboy magazine in January 1979, Brando said: "You've seen every single race besmirched, but you never saw an image of the kike because the Jews were ever so watchful for that—and rightly so. They never allowed it to be shown on screen. The Jews have done so much for the world that, I suppose, you get extra disappointed because they didn't pay attention to that." He later stated similar comments in his 1994 autobiography Songs My Mother Taught Me.

Brando made a similar comment on Larry King Live in April 1996, saying:

Hollywood is run by Jews; it is owned by Jews, and they should have a greater sensitivity about the issue of—of people who are suffering. Because they've exploited—we have seen the—we have seen the nigger and greaseball, we've seen the chink, we've seen the slit-eyed dangerous Jap, we have seen the wily Filipino, we've seen everything, but we never saw the kike. Because they knew perfectly well, that that is where you draw the wagons around.

Larry King, who was Jewish, replied: "When you say—when you say something like that, you are playing right in, though, to anti-Semitic people who say the Jews are—" Brando interrupted: "No, no, because I will be the first one who will appraise the Jews honestly and say 'Thank God for the Jews'."

Jay Kanter, Brando's agent, producer, and friend, defended him in Daily Variety: "Marlon has spoken to me for hours about his fondness for the Jewish people, and he is a well-known supporter of Israel"; Kanter himself was Jewish. Similarly, Louie Kemp, in his article for The Jewish Journal of Greater Los Angeles, wrote: "You might remember him as Don Vito Corleone, Stanley Kowalski or the eerie Col. Walter E. Kurtz in 'Apocalypse Now', but I remember Marlon Brando as a mensch and a personal friend of the Jewish people when they needed it most."

Marlon's autobiography repeatedly condemns the actions of Israel. He went over how he once supported Israel, in the 1940s, and then his opinion shifted as he grew older: "As when I sided with Jewish terrorists without acknowledging that they were killing innocent Palestinians in their effort to create the state of Israel, I believed there was a right and wrong about everything, with nothing in between, and I wanted to be sure I was always on the right side."

== Later life and death ==
Brando's notoriety, his troubled family life, and his obesity attracted more attention than his later acting career. He gained a great deal of weight in the 1970s; by the early-to-mid-1990s, he weighed over 300 pounds (140 kg) and suffered from type 2 diabetes. He had a history of weight fluctuation throughout his career that, by and large, he attributed to his years of stress-related overeating, followed by compensatory dieting. He also earned a reputation for being difficult on the set, often unwilling or unable to memorize his lines and less interested in taking direction than in confronting the film director with odd demands. He also dabbled with some innovation in his last years. He had several patents issued in his name from the United States Patent and Trademark Office, all of which involve a method of tensioning drumheads, between June 2002 and November 2004 (for example, see U.S. patent 6,812,392). Brando also made sketches as a hobby.

In 2004, Brando recorded voice tracks for the character Mrs. Sour in the unreleased animated film Big Bug Man. This was his last role and his only role as a female character. A longtime close friend of singer Michael Jackson, Brando paid regular visits to his Neverland Ranch, resting there for weeks at a time. Brando also participated in Jackson's two-day solo career 30th-anniversary celebration concerts in 2001 and starred in his 13-minute-long music video "You Rock My World", in the same year.

Brando's son, Miko, was Jackson's bodyguard and assistant for several years and was a friend of the singer. "The last time my father left his house to go anywhere, to spend any kind of time, it was with Michael Jackson", Miko stated. "He loved it ... He had a 24-hour chef, 24-hour security, 24-hour help, 24-hour kitchen, 24-hour maid service. Just carte blanche." "Michael was instrumental helping my father through the last few years of his life. For that I will always be indebted to him. Dad had a hard time breathing in his final days and he was on oxygen much of the time. He loved the outdoors, so Michael would invite him over to Neverland. Dad could name all the trees there and the flowers, but being on oxygen it was hard for him to get around and see them all, it's such a big place. So Michael got Dad a golf cart with a portable oxygen tank so he could go around and enjoy Neverland. They'd just drive around—Michael Jackson, Marlon Brando, with an oxygen tank in a golf cart." In April 2001, Brando was hospitalized with pneumonia. In 2004, Brando signed with film director Ridha Behi and began preproduction on a project to be titled Brando and Brando. Up to a week before his death, he was working on the script in anticipation of a July/August 2004 start date. Production was suspended in July 2004 following Brando's death, at which time Behi stated that he would continue the film as an homage to Brando, with a new title of Citizen Brando, which ultimately became Always Brando (2011).

Brando died on July 1, 2004, of respiratory failure from pulmonary fibrosis with congestive heart failure at the Ronald Reagan UCLA Medical Center, at age 80. The cause of death was initially withheld, with his lawyer citing privacy concerns. He also suffered from diabetes and liver cancer. Shortly before his death and despite needing an oxygen mask to breathe, he recorded his voice to appear in the video game The Godfather (2006), once again as Don Vito Corleone. Brando recorded only one line due to his health and an impersonator was hired to finish his lines. His single recorded line was included within the final game as a tribute to the actor. Some additional lines from his character were directly lifted from the film. Karl Malden—Brando's co-star in three films (A Streetcar Named Desire, On the Waterfront, and One-Eyed Jacks)—spoke in a documentary accompanying the DVD of A Streetcar Named Desire about a phone call he received from Brando shortly before Brando's death. A distressed Brando told Malden he kept falling over. Malden wanted to come over, but Brando put him off, telling him there was no point. Three weeks later, Brando was dead. Shortly before his death, he had apparently refused permission for tubes carrying oxygen to be inserted into his lungs, which, he was told, was the only way to prolong his life.

Brando was cremated and his ashes were placed with those of Wally Cox. They were then scattered partly in Tahiti and partly in Death Valley.

== Legacy ==
That will be Brando's legacy whether he likes it or not—the stunning actor who embodied a poetry of anxiety that touched the deepest dynamics of his time and place.

— Jack Kroll in 1994

Brando was one of the most respected actors of the post-war era. He is listed by the American Film Institute as the fourth greatest male star whose screen debut occurred before or during 1950 (it occurred in 1950). Film critic Pauline Kael called him an "American hero" and the main protagonist of the 1950s that embodied the tragic forces and themes of the time. He earned respect among critics for his memorable performances and charismatic screen presence. He helped popularize 'method acting'. He is regarded as one of the greatest cinema actors of the 20th century. Furthermore, he was one of only six actors named in 1999 by Time magazine in its list of the 100 Most Important People of the Century. In this list, Time also designated Brando as the "Actor of the Century".

Encyclopædia Britannica describes him as "the most celebrated of the method actors, and his slurred, mumbling delivery marked his rejection of classical dramatic training. His true and passionate performances proved him one of the greatest actors of his generation." It also notes the apparent paradox of his talent: "He is regarded as the most influential actor of his generation, yet his open disdain for the acting profession ... often manifested itself in the form of questionable choices and uninspired performances. Nevertheless, he remains a riveting screen presence with a vast emotional range and an endless array of compulsively watchable idiosyncrasies."

=== Cultural influence ===
He was our angry young man—the delinquent, the tough, the rebel—who stood at the center of our common experience.

— Pauline Kael

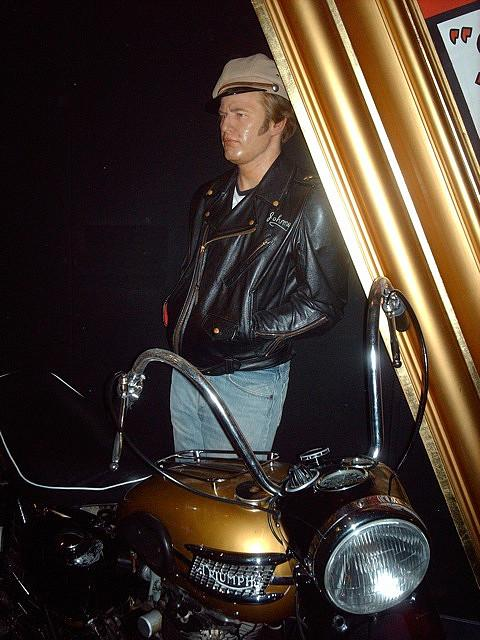
Madame Tussauds waxwork exhibit of Brando in The Wild One albeit with a later 1957/58 model Triumph Thunderbird.

Marlon Brando is a cultural icon with enduring popularity. His rise to national attention in the 1950s had a profound effect on American culture. According to film critic Pauline Kael, "Brando represented a reaction against the post-war mania for security. As a protagonist, the Brando of the early fifties had no code, only his instincts. He was a development from the gangster leader and the outlaw. He was antisocial because he knew society was crap; he was a hero to youth because he was strong enough not to take the crap ... Brando represented a contemporary version of the free American."

Sociologist Suzanne McDonald-Walker states: "Marlon Brando, sporting leather jacket, jeans, and moody glare, became a cultural icon summing up 'the road' in all its maverick glory." His portrayal of the gang leader Johnny Strabler in The Wild One has become an enduring image, used both as a symbol of rebelliousness and a fashion accessory that includes a Perfecto style motorcycle jacket, a tilted cap, jeans and sunglasses. Johnny's haircut inspired a craze for sideburns, followed by James Dean and Elvis Presley, among others. Dean copied Brando's acting style extensively and Presley used Brando's image as a model for his role in Jailhouse Rock. Brando fans at the time held extraordinary resentment towards other actors, including Dean, if anyone came close to copying Brando's style as if another actor was trying to "take away some power from their god." These even extended to jeers and movie theater walkout by his devout following.

The "I coulda been a contender" scene from On the Waterfront, according to the author of Brooklyn Boomer, Martin H. Levinson, is "one of the most famous scenes in motion picture history, and the line itself has become part of America's cultural lexicon." An example of the endurance of Brando's popular "Wild One" image was the 2009 release of replicas of the leather jacket worn by Brando's Johnny Strabler character. The jackets were marketed by Triumph, the manufacturer of the Triumph Thunderbird motorcycles featured in The Wild One, and were officially licensed by Brando's estate.

Brando was also considered a male sex symbol. Linda Williams writes: "Marlon Brando [was] the quintessential American male sex symbol of the late fifties and early sixties". Brando was an early lesbian icon who, along with James Dean, influenced the butch look and self-image in the 1950s and after.

Brando has also been immortalized in music; most notably, he was mentioned in the lyrics of "It's Hard to Be a Saint in the City" by Bruce Springsteen, in which one of the opening lines read "I could walk like Brando right in to the sun", and in Neil Young's "Pocahontas" as a tribute to his lifetime support of Native Americans and in which Brando is depicted sitting by a fire with Young and Pocahontas. Brando was also mentioned in "China Girl" by Iggy Pop and David Bowie on Iggy Pop's 1977 album The Idiot. In "Vogue" by Madonna, "Is This What You Wanted" by Leonard Cohen on the album New Skin for the Old Ceremony, "Eyeless" by Slipknot on their self-titled album, and most recently in the song simply titled "Marlon Brando" on the Australian singer Alex Cameron's 2017 album Forced Witness. Bob Dylan's 2020 song "My Own Version of You" references one of his most famous performances in the line: "I'll take the Scarface Pacino and the Godfather Brando / Mix 'em up in a tank and get a robot commando."

Brando is portrayed in the stage play Kowalski by Gregg Ostrin. The play portrays his first meeting with Tennessee Williams prior to starring in A Streetcar Named Desire.

Brando is also visible on the cover of the Beatles' 1967 album Sgt. Pepper's Lonely Hearts Club Band, among a tableau of celebrities and historical figures.

Brando's films, along with those of James Dean, caused Honda to come forward with its "You Meet the Nicest People on a Honda" ads, to curb the negative association motorcycles had gotten with rebels and outlaws.

=== Views on acting ===
In his autobiography Songs My Mother Taught Me, Brando observed:

I've always thought that one benefit of acting is that it gives actors a chance to express feelings that they are normally unable to vent in real life. Intense emotions buried inside you can come smoking out the back of your head, and I suppose in terms of psychodrama this can be helpful. In hindsight, I guess my emotional insecurity as a child—the frustrations of not being allowed to be who I was, of wanting love and not being able to get it, of realizing that I was of no value—may have helped me as an actor, at least in a small way. It probably gave me a certain intensity that most people don't have.

He also confessed that, while having great admiration for the theater, he did not return to it after his initial success primarily because the work left him drained emotionally:

What I remember most about A Streetcar Named Desire was the emotional grind of acting in it six nights and two afternoons. Try to imagine what it was like walking on stage at 8:30 every night having to yell, scream, cry, break dishes, kick the furniture, punch the walls and experience the same intense, wrenching emotions night after night, trying each time to evoke in audiences the same emotions I felt. It was exhausting.

Brando repeatedly credited Stella Adler and her understanding of the Stanislavski acting technique for bringing realism to American cinema, but also added:

This school of acting served the American theater and motion pictures well, but it was restricting. The American theater has never been able to present Shakespeare or classical drama of any kind satisfactorily. We simply do not have the style, the regard for the language or the cultural disposition ... You cannot mumble in Shakespeare. You cannot improvise, and you are required to adhere strictly to the text. The English theater has a sense of language that we do not recognize ... In the United States the English language has developed almost into a patois.

In the 2015 documentary Listen to Me Marlon, Brando shared his thoughts on playing a death scene, stating, "That's a tough scene to play. You have to make 'em believe that you are dying ... Try to think of the most intimate moment you've ever had in your life."

His favorite actors were Spencer Tracy, John Barrymore, Fredric March, James Cagney, and Paul Muni. He also showed admiration for Sean Penn, Jack Nicholson, Johnny Depp, and Daniel Day-Lewis.

== Acting credits and accolades ==
Among the numerous accolades for his acting work, Brando has won two Academy Awards for Best Actor for his role as a longshoreman in the Elia Kazan directed drama On the Waterfront (1954) and Vito Corleone in the Francis Ford Coppola directed crime film The Godfather (1972). He also won three BAFTA Awards, five Golden Globe Awards and a Primetime Emmy Award.

Over his lengthy career he has been recognized by the Academy of Motion Picture Arts and Sciences for the following performances:

- 24th Academy Awards: Best Actor in a Leading Role, nomination, A Streetcar Named Desire (1951)
- 25th Academy Awards: Best Actor in a Leading Role, nomination, Viva Zapata! (1952)
- 26th Academy Awards: Best Actor in a Leading Role, nomination, Julius Caesar (1953)
- 27th Academy Awards: Best Actor in a Leading Role, win, On the Waterfront (1954)
- 30th Academy Awards: Best Actor in a Leading Role, nomination, Sayonara (1957)
- 45th Academy Awards: Best Actor in a Leading Role, win, The Godfather (1972)
- 46th Academy Awards: Best Actor in a Leading Role, nomination, Last Tango in Paris (1973)
- 62nd Academy Awards: Best Actor in a Supporting Role, nomination, A Dry White Season (1989)

== See also ==
- List of actors with two or more Academy Awards in acting categories
- List of youngest Academy Award winners and nominees — Youngest winners for Best Lead Actor
- Marlon Bundo, a pet rabbit named after Brando

== Works cited ==
- Adler, Stella; Paris, Barry (1999). Stella Adler on Ibsen, Strindberg, and Chekhov. New York City: Alfred A. Knopf. ISBN 0-679-42442-3.
- Bly, Nellie (1994). Marlon Brando: Larger than Life. New York City: Pinnacle Books/Windsor Pub. Corp. ISBN 0-7860-0086-4.
- Bosworth, Patricia (2002) [2001]. Marlon Brando. Phoenix. ISBN 978-0-7538-1379-9.
- Brando, Anna Kashfi; Stein, E.P. (1979). Brando for Breakfast. New York: Crown Publishers. ISBN 0-517-53686-2.
- Brando, Marlon; Lindsey, Robert (1994). Brando: Songs My Mother Taught Me. Random House. ISBN 978-0-679-41013-3.
- Dimare, Philip C. (2011). Movies in American History: An Encyclopedia. Santa Barbara, California: ABC-CLIO. ISBN 978-1-59884-296-8.
- Ebert, Roger (2010). The Great Movies III. Chicago: University of Chicago Press. ISBN 978-0-226-18208-7.
- Evans, Robert (1994). The Kid Stays in the Picture. New York: Hyperion. ISBN 978-0-7868-6059-3.
- Girgus, Sam B. (1998). Hollywood Renaissance: The Cinema of Democracy in the Era of Ford, Capra, and Kazan. New York City: Cambridge University Press. ISBN 978-0-521-62552-4.
- Graziano, Rocky; Barber, Rowland (1955). Somebody Up There Likes Me. New York: Simon & Schuster.
- Grobel, Lawrence (2000). Above the Line: Conversations about the Movies. New York City: Da Capo Press. ISBN 978-0-306-80978-1.
- Hamilton, Neil A. (2006). The 1970s. Eyewitness History. New York: Facts on File. ISBN 978-0-8160-5778-8.
- Kanfer, Stefan (2008). Somebody: The Reckless Life and Remarkable Career of Marlon Brando. Alfred A. Knopf. ISBN 978-1-4000-4289-0.
- Kaufman, Burton I.; Kaufman, Diane (2009). The A to Z of the Eisenhower Era. Lanham, MD: Scarecrow Press. ISBN 978-0-8108-7150-2.
- Lebo, Harlan (2005). The Godfather Legacy: The Untold Story of the Making of the Classic Godfather Trilogy. New York City: Touchstone Press. ISBN 978-0-7432-8777-7.
- Levinson, Martin H. (2011). Brooklyn Boomer: Growing Up in the Fifties. Bloomington, IN: iUniverse. ISBN 978-1-4620-1712-6.
- McDonald-Walker, Suzanne (2000). Bikers: Culture, Politics and Power. Oxford: Berg Publishers. ISBN 1-85973-356-5.
- McGowan, David (2014). Weird Scenes Inside the Canyon: Laurel Canyon, Covert Ops & the Dark Heart of the Hippie Dream. SCB Distributors. ISBN 978-1-9093-9413-1.
- Pierpont, Claudia Roth (October 27, 2008). "Method Man". The New Yorker.
- Powell, Larry; Garrett, Tom (2013). The Films of John Avildsen: Rocky, The Karate Kid and Other Underdogs. Jefferson, NC: McFarland & Company. ISBN 978-0-7864-6692-4.
- Santopietro, Tom (2012). The Godfather Effect: Changing Hollywood, America, and Me. New York City: Thomas Dunne Books. ISBN 978-1-250-00513-7.
- Sellers, Robert (2010). Hollywood Hellraisers: The Wild Lives and Fast Times of Marlon Brando, Dennis Hopper, Warren Beatty, and Jack Nicholson. New York City: Skyhorse Publishing. ISBN 978-1-61608-035-8.
- Stern, Keith (2009). Queers in History: The Comprehensive Encyclopedia of Historical Gays, Lesbians and Bisexual. Jackson, TN: BenBella Books. ISBN 978-1-933771-87-8.
- Williams, Linda (2008). Screening Sex. Durham, NC: Duke University Press. ISBN 978-0-8223-4285-4.
