= List of Marlon Brando performances =

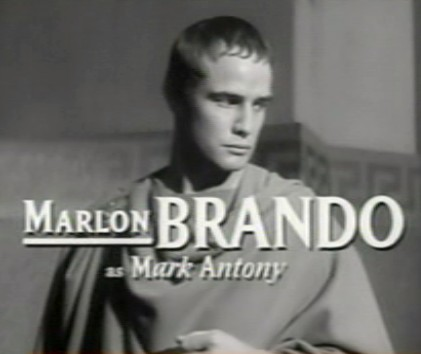
- Brando from a trailer for the film Julius Caesar (1953), for which he received his third Oscar nomination.
- Film: 40
- Television series: 3
- Music videos: 1
- Theatre: 7
- Others: 1 video game

Marlon Brando (1924 – 2004) was an American actor and considered one of the most influential actors of the 20th century.

Having studied with Stella Adler in the 1940s, he is credited with being one of the first actors to bring the Stanislavski system of acting, and method acting, to mainstream audiences. He gained acclaim for his role of Stanley Kowalski in the 1951 film adaptation of Tennessee Williams' play A Streetcar Named Desire, a role that he originated successfully on Broadway. He received further praise, and a first Academy Award and Golden Globe Award, for his performance as Terry Malloy in On the Waterfront, and his portrayal of the rebellious motorcycle gang leader Johnny Strabler in The Wild One proved to be a lasting image in popular culture. Brando received Academy Award nominations for playing Emiliano Zapata in Viva Zapata! (1952); Mark Antony in Joseph L. Mankiewicz's 1953 film adaptation of Shakespeare's Julius Caesar; and Air Force Major Lloyd Gruver in Sayonara (1957), an adaptation of James A. Michener's 1954 novel.

The 1960s saw Brando's career take a commercial and critical downturn. He directed and starred in the cult western One-Eyed Jacks, a critical and commercial flop, after which he delivered a series of notable box-office failures, beginning with Mutiny on the Bounty (1962). After ten years of underachieving, he agreed to do a screen test as Vito Corleone in Francis Ford Coppola's The Godfather (1972). The Godfather became the highest-grossing film ever made, and alongside his Oscar-nominated performance in Last Tango in Paris (1972), Brando reestablished himself in the ranks of top box-office stars. After a hiatus in the early 1970s, Brando appeared in supporting roles such as Jor-El in Superman (1978), as Colonel Kurtz in Apocalypse Now (1979), and Adam Steiffel in The Formula (1980), before taking a nine-year break from film.

== Theater ==
Stage credits
Year	Title	Role	Notes	Refs.
1944	Bobino	Giraffe/Guard		
1944	I Remember Mama	Nels	Broadway debut, original cast	
1946	Truckline Cafe	Sage McRae	Original cast	
1946	A Flag Is Born	David	Original cast	
1946	Candida	Eugene Marchbanks		
1946	Antigone	Messenger		
1947	Eagle Rampant (The Eagle Has Two Heads)	Stanislas		
1947	A Streetcar Named Desire	Stanley Kowalski	Original cast	
1953	Arms and the Man	Sergius	Final play	

== Film ==
Film credits
Year	Title	Role	Notes	Refs.
1950	The Men	Kenneth "Ken" Wilcheck / "Bud"		
1951	A Streetcar Named Desire	Stanley Kowalski		
1952	Viva Zapata!	Emiliano Zapata		
1953	Julius Caesar	Mark Antony		
1953	The Wild One	Johnny Strabler		
1954	On the Waterfront	Terry Malloy		
1954	Désirée	Napoleon Bonaparte		
1955	Guys and Dolls	Sky Masterson		
1956	The Teahouse of the August Moon	Sakini		
1957	Sayonara	Maj. Lloyd "Ace" Gruver, USAF		
1958	The Young Lions	Lt. Christian Diestl		
1960	The Fugitive Kind	Valentine "Snakeskin" Xavier		
1961	One-Eyed Jacks	Rio	Also director	
1962	Mutiny on the Bounty	1st Lt. Fletcher Christian		
1963	The Ugly American	Ambassador Harrison Carter MacWhite		
1964	Bedtime Story	Freddy Benson		
1965	Morituri	Robert Crain		
1966	The Chase	Sheriff Calder		
1966	The Appaloosa	Matt Fletcher		
1967	A Countess from Hong Kong	Ogden Mears		
1967	Reflections in a Golden Eye	Maj. Weldon Penderton		
1968	Candy	Grindl		
1969	The Night of the Following Day	Chauffeur		
1969	Burn!	Sir William Walker		
1971	The Nightcomers	Peter Quint		
1972	The Godfather	Don Vito Corleone		
1972	Last Tango in Paris	Paul		
1976	The Missouri Breaks	Robert E. Lee Clayton		
1978	Superman	Jor-El		
1978	Raoni	Narrator	Voice; Documentary	
1979	Apocalypse Now	Colonel Walter E. Kurtz		
1980	The Formula	Adam Steiffel		
1989	A Dry White Season	Ian McKenzie		
1990	The Freshman	Carmine Sabatini		
1992	Christopher Columbus: The Discovery	Tomás de Torquemada		
1995	Don Juan DeMarco	Dr. Jack Mickler		
1996	Divine Rapture	Priest	Unreleased	
1996	The Island of Dr. Moreau	Dr. Moreau		
1997	The Brave	McCarthy		
1998	Free Money	Warden Sven "The Swede" Sorenson		
2001	The Score	Max		
2004	Big Bug Man	Mrs. Sour	Voice; Unreleased	
2006	Superman II: The Richard Donner Cut	Jor-El	Posthumous release, re-edit of the 1980 film, reinstating Brando's scenes	

== Television ==
Year	Title	Role	Notes	Refs.
1949	Actors Studio	Doctor	Episode: "I'm No Hero"	
1950	Come Out Fighting	Jimmy Brand	Pilot	
1979	Roots: The Next Generations	George Lincoln Rockwell	Episode: Part VII (1960-1967)	

== Music video ==
Music video credits
Year	Song	Artist	Role	Refs.
2001	"You Rock My World"	Michael Jackson	The Boss	

== Video game ==
Video game credits
Year	Title	Voice role	Notes	Refs.
2006	The Godfather	Don Vito Corleone	Cameo; released posthumously	
