= Pina Pellicer =

Mexican actress (1934–1964)

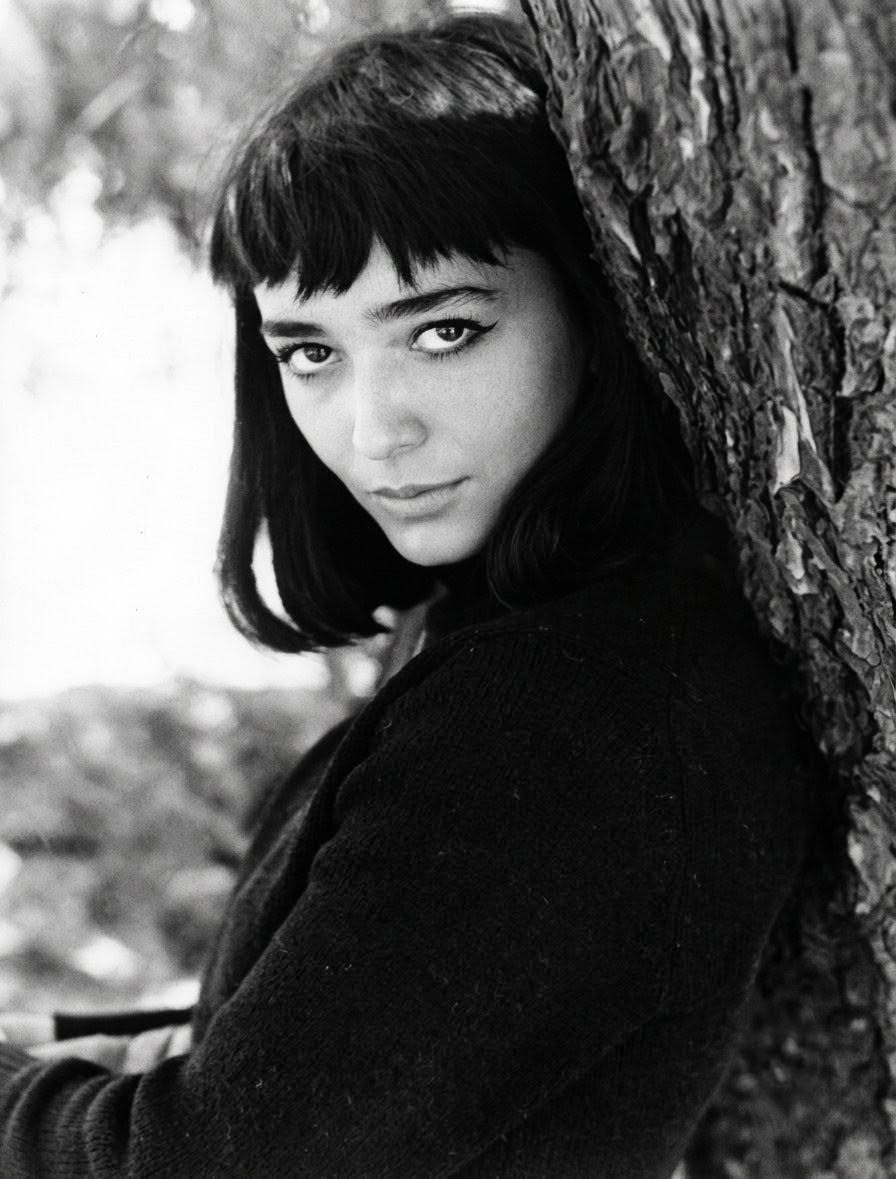
- Pellicer in the 1950s
- Born: Josefina Yolanda Pellicer López de Llergo; 3 April 1934; Mexico City, Mexico
- Died: 6 December 1964 (aged 30); Mexico City, Mexico
- Resting place: Panteón Jardín; Mexico City, Mexico
- Occupation: Actress
- Years active: 1950–1964
- Spouse: Ramón Naves (m. 1963; div. 1963)
- Relatives: Pilar Pellicer (sister); Ana Pellicer (sister); Carlos Pellicer (uncle)

Josefina Yolanda Pellicer López de Llergo (3 April 1934 – 6 December 1964), known professionally as Pina Pellicer, was a Mexican actress. In Mexico, she is best remembered for portraying the female lead in Macario (1960) and Luisa in Días de Otoño (1963), and in the United States for her role as Louisa alongside Marlon Brando in the Brando-directed movie One-Eyed Jacks (1961).

Other of her notable works include the Spanish drama Rogelia (1962), and episodes in TV shows such as The Fugitive and The Alfred Hitchcock Hour.

== Early life ==
Josefina Yolanda Pellicer López de Llergo was born on 3 April 1934 in Mexico City, the daughter of César Pellicer Sánchez, a lawyer, and Pilar López de Llergo. Her uncle, Carlos Pellicer, was a modernist poet. Of her seven siblings, her younger sister Pilar Pellicer also became an actress best known for her roles in numerous telenovelas. Another younger sister, Ana, was a sculptor and the co-author of Pina Pellicer's 2006 biography.

== Career ==
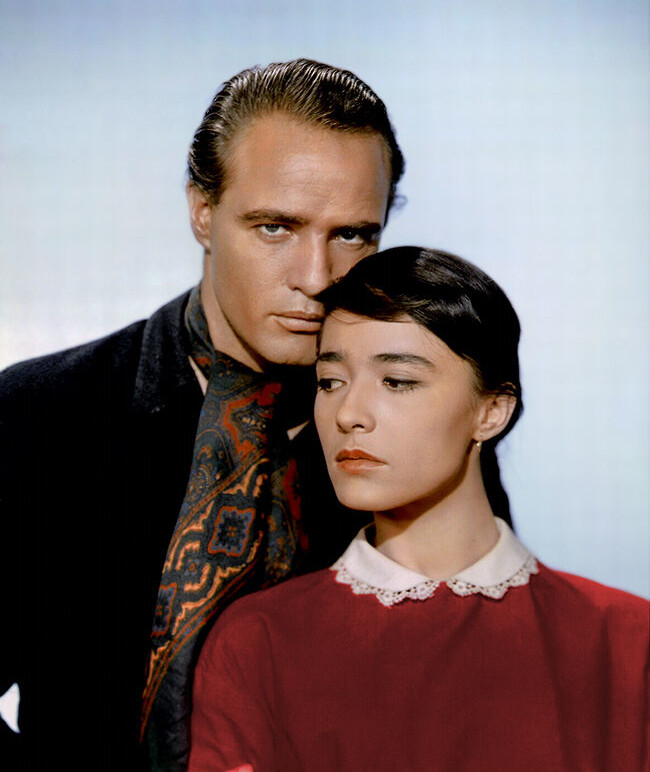
Pellicer with Marlon Brando in a publicity photo for One-Eyed Jacks (1961)

Pellicer's first acting role, albeit only her second movie to be released, was the Paramount Pictures production One-Eyed Jacks. In the movie, Pellicer played Louisa, the stepdaughter of Karl Malden and the lover of Marlon Brando. Mexican actress Katy Jurado appeared as Louisa's mother. The production of the movie was much delayed, and the original director, Stanley Kubrick left, along with screenwriter Sam Peckinpah, leaving Brando to finish the movie – the only time Brando was credited with directing a movie.

Production started in 1958; the movie was released in 1961. European response was positive, and in July 1961, the movie received the Golden Shell (Concha de Oro) at the San Sebastián International Film Festival. Pellicer was awarded the prize for best female performer. Reviews compared her to Audrey Hepburn. In the United States, the response was more mixed and the movie received only one Academy Award nomination, for Charles Lang's cinematography.

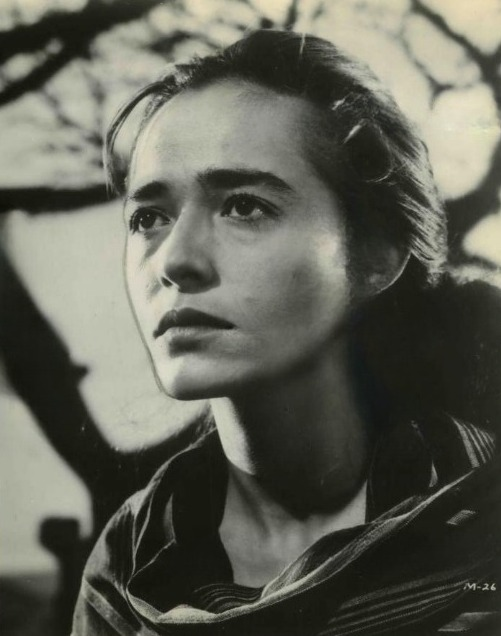
Pellicer in Macario (1960)

The first movie with Pellicer to reach theaters was the Mexican production Macario, released in 1960. Pellicer played the wife of the title character opposite Ignacio López Tarso. Macario was the first Mexican production to be nominated for the Academy Award for Best Foreign Language Film, but lost out to Ingmar Bergman's The Virgin Spring. After Macario, Pellicer appeared in two more Mexican films, Días de Otoño, from 1963, and El pecador, released posthumously in 1965.

During her appearance at the San Sebastián Film Festival, Pellicer met Spanish director Rafael Gil, who cast the actress in the title role in Rogelia, filmed in Asturias and released in 1962. In addition to her film work, Pellicer appeared in episodes of the television shows The Fugitive ("Smoke Screen", 1963) and The Alfred Hitchcock Hour ("The Life Work of Juan Diaz", 1964, written by Ray Bradbury), as well as on Mexican television.

== Personal life ==
Following her death, the newspaper La Prensa visited the funeral home where her wake was to be held. There, they learned, and later reported, that Pellicer had been secretly married to businessman and hotelier Ramón Naves. Their marriage lasted only a few months in 1963, as it was said that the artist was unable to adapt to married life, being a woman mostly accustomed to being alone. Without giving him any explanation, she divorced, and at the time, only her friend, actor Salomón Laiter, and her sisters, Ana, Taide and Pilar Pellicer, knew about this union.

According to the book Me and Marlon written by Alice Marchak, Marlon Brando's personal secretary, Pina told the actor that she was a lesbian; the excerpt states:

"When Pina Pellicer arrived from Mexico, Marlon wined and dined her. Then one night while making his midnight stop at my room, he confided that after dinner, he had escorted Pina to her room and made a move on her. She had rebuffed him by stating, "Marlon, I'm a lesbian." I burst out laughing, and so did he. He said it was a first for him. So much for seducing his leading lady."

Pellicer never openly clarified the issue of her orientation, but it is considered one of the reasons why she ended her life, as it was a possible constant with which she used to live in duality due to the closed ideas that Mexico had at the time regarding sexual diversity.

== Death ==
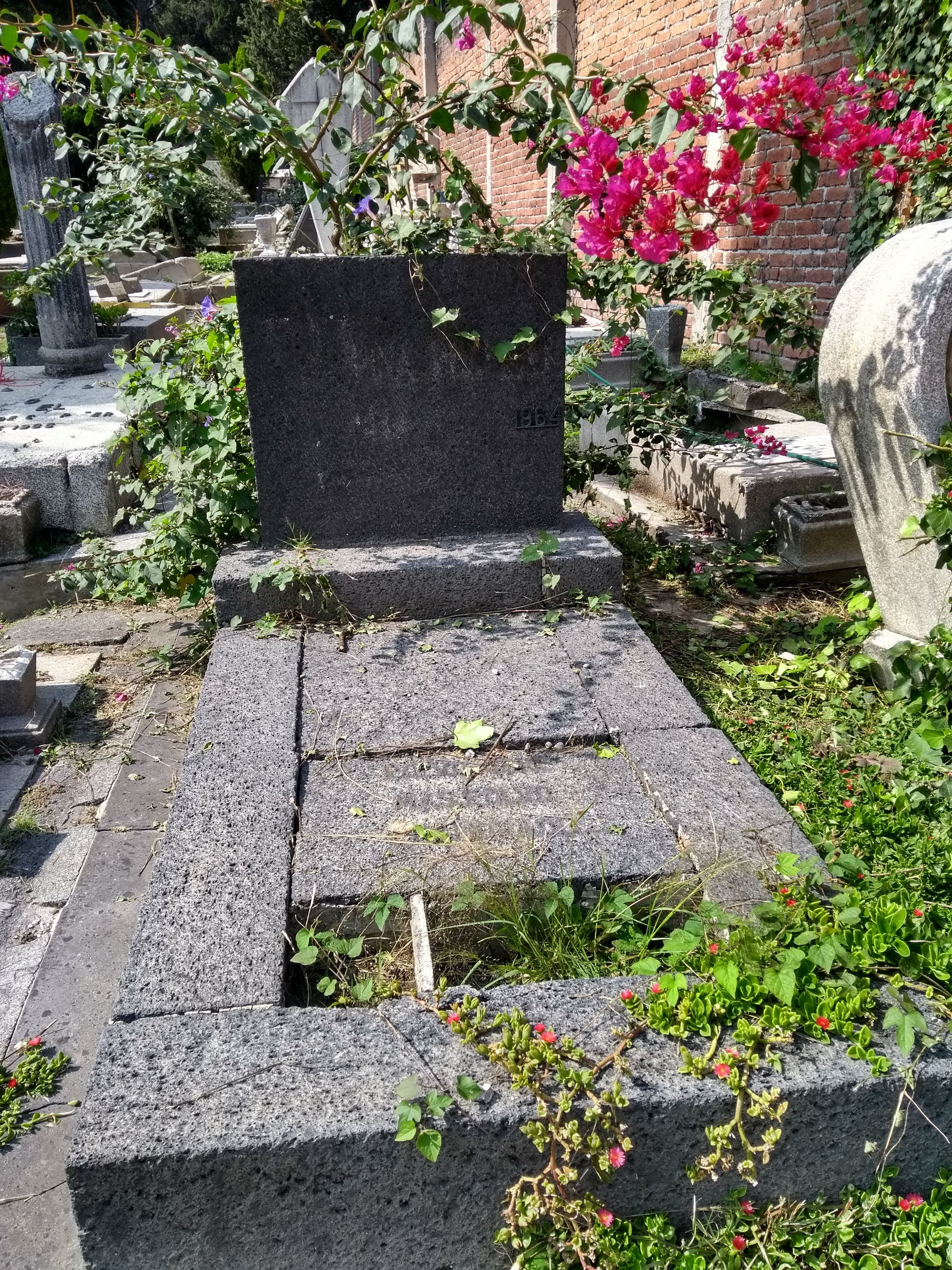
Pellicer's grave, located in the Panteón Jardín in Mexico City

Pellicer died by suicide on 6 December 1964, aged 30, from an overdose of sleeping pills. Her body was buried at Panteón Jardín in Mexico City.

== Filmography ==
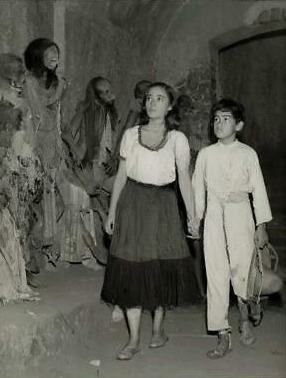
Pellicer and Larry Domasin on the episode "The Life Work of Juan Diaz" (1964) of the program The Alfred Hitchcock Hour

=== Film ===
Year	Title	Role	Notes
1950	La liga de las muchachas	Dancer	Extra / Uncredited
1960	Macario	Macario's wife	
1961	One-Eyed Jacks	Louisa	Silver Shell for Best Actress; American production
1962	Rogelia	Rogelia	Spanish production
1962	Días de Otoño	Luisa	
1965	El pecador	Irma	Posthumous release

=== Television ===
Year	Title	Role	Notes
1963	The Fugitive	María Álvarez	Episode: "Smoke Screen"
1964	The Alfred Hitchcock Hour	María Díaz	Episode: "The Life Work of Juan Díaz"
1964	Gran teatro	Electra - episode: "Electra"	Lost media
1964	Pacto de Medianoche	Elsa	Lost media
1964	La dama de corazones	Unknown role	Lost media
