= Macario (film) =

1960 film

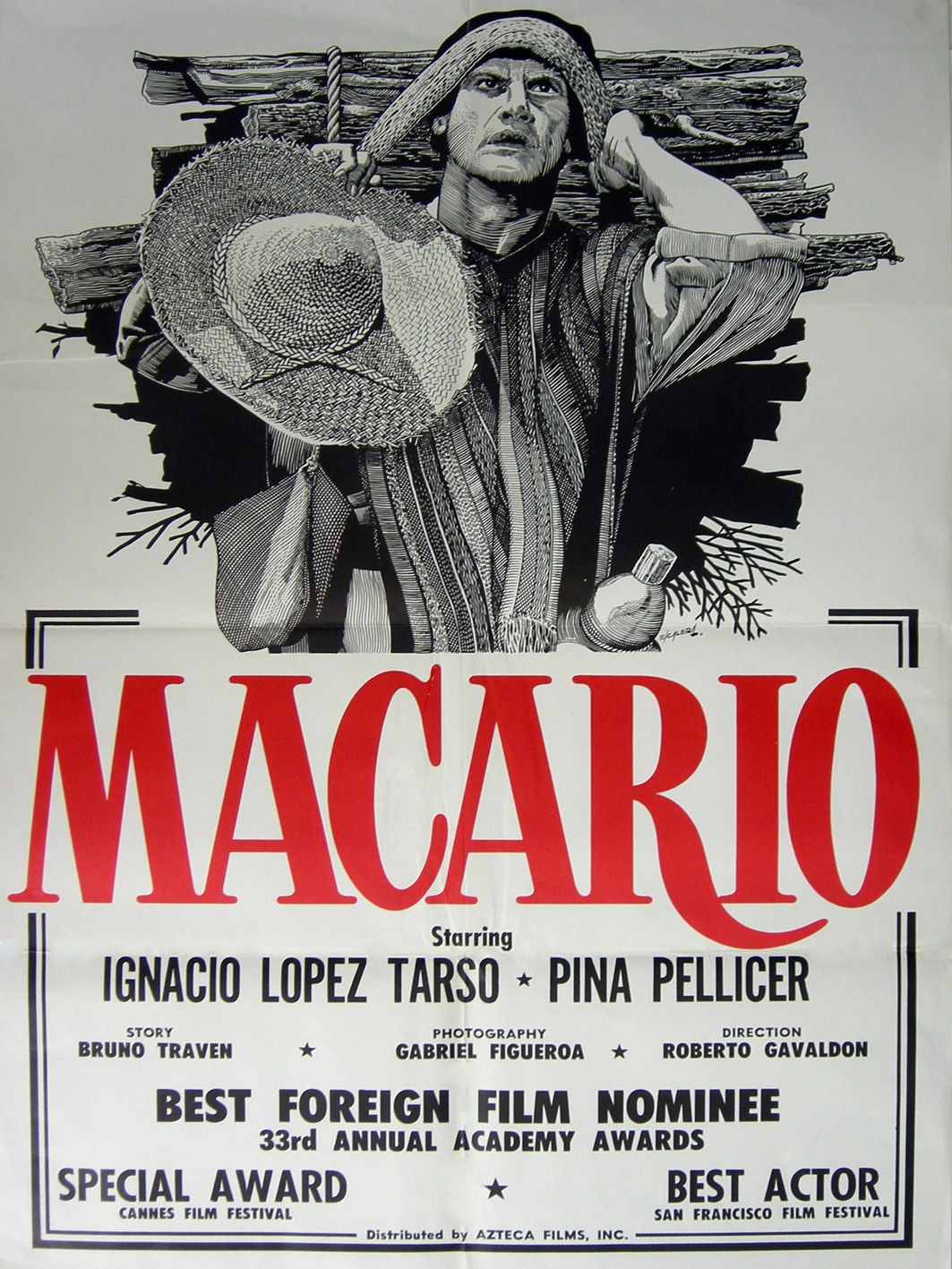
- US release poster
- Directed by: Roberto Gavaldón
- Screenplay by: Emilio Carballido; Roberto Gavaldón
- Based on: Macario by B. Traven
- Produced by: Armando Orive Alba
- Starring: Ignacio López Tarso; Pina Pellicer
- Cinematography: Gabriel Figueroa
- Edited by: Gloria Schoemann
- Music by: Raúl Lavista
- Production companies: Clasa Films Mundiales; Estudios Churubusco
- Release dates: May 1960 (Cannes); 9 June 1960 (Mexico)
- Running time: 90 minutes
- Country: Mexico
- Language: Spanish

Macario is a 1960 Mexican supernatural psychological drama film directed by Roberto Gavaldón, starring Ignacio López Tarso and Pina Pellicer. It is based on the novel of the same name by B. Traven, loosely based on the Brothers Grimm story Godfather Death, set in the Viceroyalty of New Spain (modern-day Mexico).

It was the first Mexican film to be nominated for an Academy Award for Best Foreign Language Film. Additionally, it was also entered into the 1960 Cannes Film Festival. Macario has been widely regarded by critics and audiences as one of the greatest Mexican films ever made.

== Plot ==
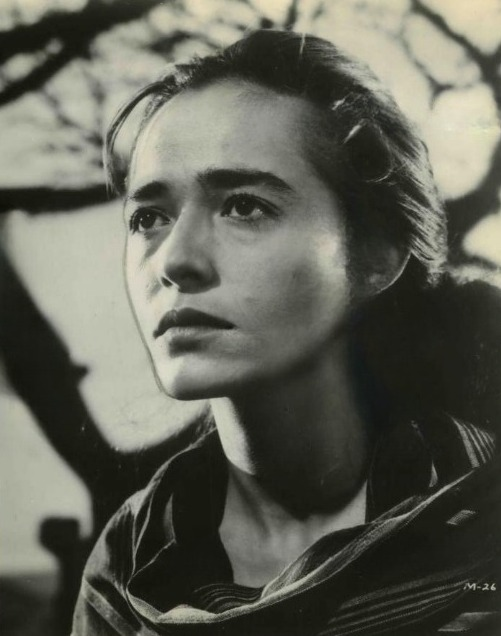
Pina Pellicer photographed for the film. She plays Macario's wife

The story centers on Macario, a poor Indigenous woodcutter, during Colonial Mexico, on the eve of the Day of the Dead, who lives embittered for being so poor and hungry. His economic situation keeps him and his family at the edge of starvation. After he sees a procession of roast turkeys, his dream is to eat a whole roast turkey just by himself. He announces in front of his wife and children that he will not eat until his dream comes true. His worried wife steals a turkey and gives it to Macario before he heads to the mountains to work.

However, just as Macario prepares to eat the turkey, three men appear to him. The first one is the Devil in the guise of a fine gentleman, who tempts Macario in order to get a piece of the turkey. The second one is God in the guise of an old man. Macario refuses to share the turkey with either, since he believes that they both have the means necessary to get themselves what they want.

When a third figure —a peasant like himself— appears to him, he gladly shares the turkey with the man. The third man is none other than Death itself. Death is unsure why Macario has shared his turkey with him and not with the Devil and God. Macario responds, "Whenever you appear, there is no time for anything else." Macario hoped to forestall what he assumed to be his imminent death by gaining the time it would take for him and Death to eat. Death is amused and as a compensation, names Macario his "friend" and gives him miraculous water that will heal any disease. If Death appears at the feet of the sick person, they can be healed with the water - but if Death appears by the person's head he or she is condemned to die. This "friendship" lasts for years, but they never speak to each other, they merely stare.

Death hints that Macario will meet him later that day. Macario returns home to find his son unconscious and badly injured from falling into a well. Macario heals his son with the water and eventually becomes known as a miraculous healer. Macario becomes wealthy from selling his cures, but creates such a commotion that he is arrested and accused of heresy. The Viceroy, however offers him freedom if he will cure his sick son.

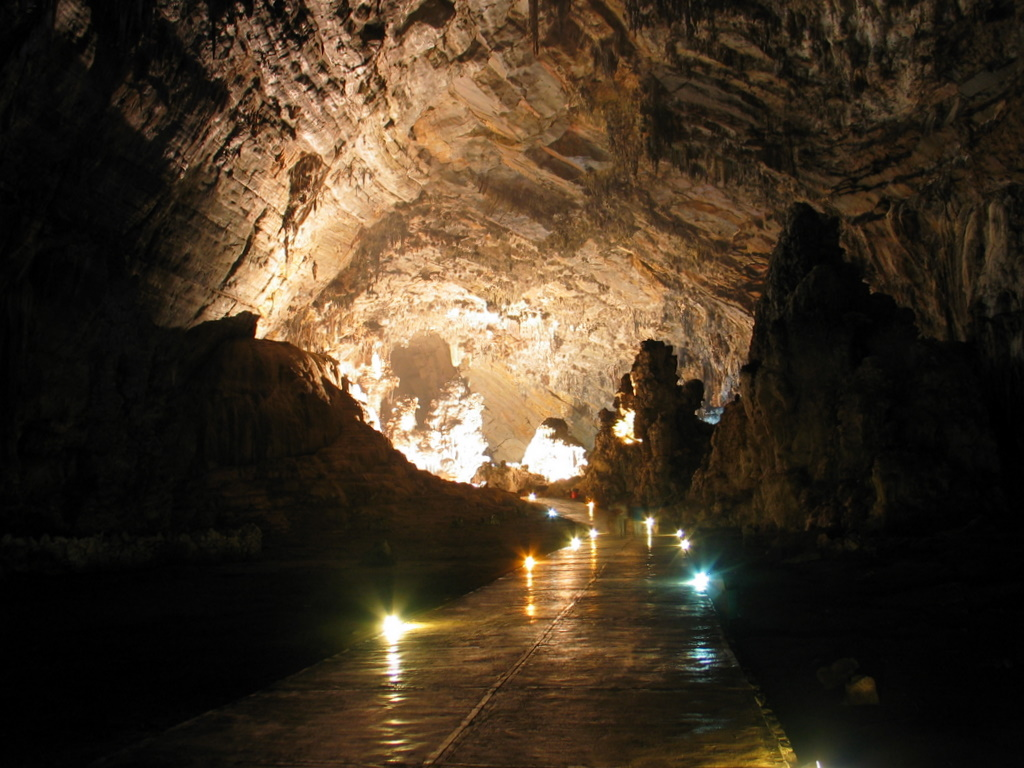
Grutas de Cacahuamilpa, the place used for filming the "Death's cavern"

Unfortunately for Macario, Death "has to take the child," so Macario, in despair, begs and tries to escape, only to enter Death's cavern and is reprimanded for turning his "gift" into merchandise. Death shows him the candles that the cavern is filled with, thousands of candles, each representing a person's life. The making of the wax and length of the candle all factor into the lifespan of a given person. Death then snuffs out the candle of the Viceroy's son before Macario's eyes. When Macario sees how short his candle is, he begs Death to save it but Death refuses. In desperation, Macario snatches up his candle and runs out of the cavern, not heeding the shouts of Death behind him.

The last scenes begin at twilight on the day that Macario shared the turkey with Death. He has not come home, and his wife and some villagers are looking for Macario out in the woods only to find him peacefully dead, next to a turkey divided in halves: one of which is eaten, the other being intact, as if he died not fulfilling his dream of eating a complete turkey for himself.

== Cast ==
Lead actors of the film
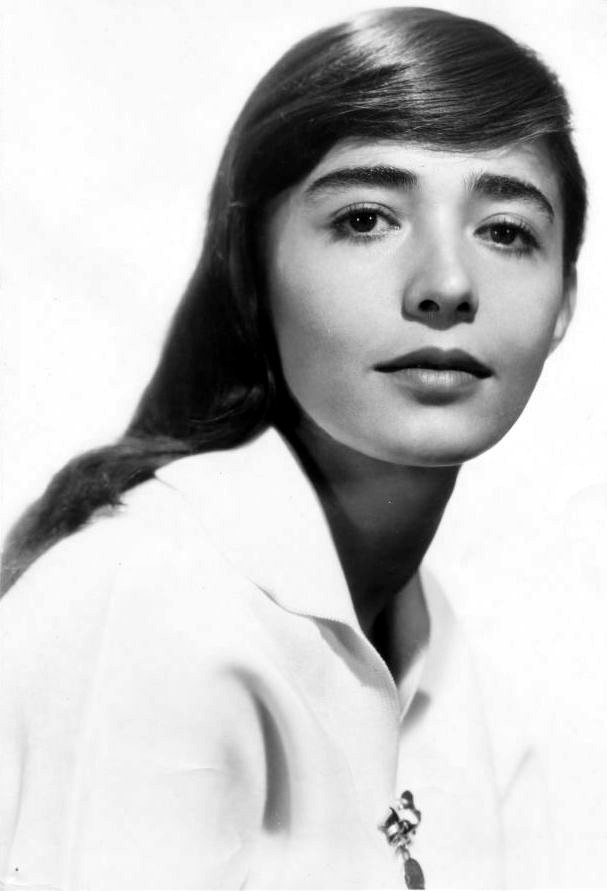
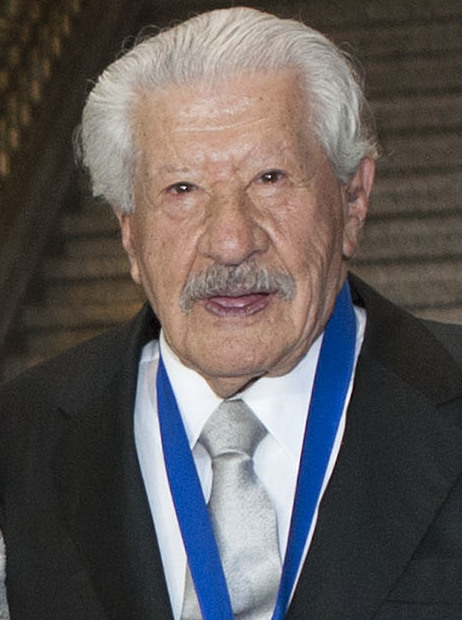
Pina Pellicer (in 1961) and Ignacio López Tarso (in 2015)
- Ignacio López Tarso as Macario
- Pina Pellicer as Macario's wife
- Enrique Lucero as Death
- Mario Alberto Rodríguez as Don Ramiro
- Enrique García Álvarez as Member of the Inquisition
- Eduardo Fajardo as Viceroy
- José Gálvez as The Devil
- José Luis Jiménez as God

=== Comparison to novel ===
The film is adapted from the story "The Third Guest" by B. Traven and differs from the plot in that in the book, Death appears to already know the course of events that will lead to Macario's downfall ("once men will know about it, you will not be able to stop") and that Death will allow one last favor, out of gratitude for restoring Death's energy for another 100 years, saving Macario's family and Macario himself from the public dishonor brought by the Inquisition verdict.

== Reception ==
=== Critical response ===
Macario received critical acclaim from critics. On the review aggregator Rotten Tomatoes, the film has a 100% approval rating based on 7 reviews, with an average rating of 8.3/10.

New York Times film critic Bosley Crowther gave the film a positive review, commending Gavaldón's direction as "remarkably fluid and strong, rich in human revelations and vivid pictorial qualities."

=== Box office ===
It was one of the most successful Mexican films of the year, grossing $80,000 in its first five weeks at the Alameda Theatre in Mexico City.

== See also ==
- List of submissions to the 33rd Academy Awards for Best Foreign Language Film
- List of Mexican submissions for the Academy Award for Best Foreign Language Film
- Godfather Death
