= Rogelia =

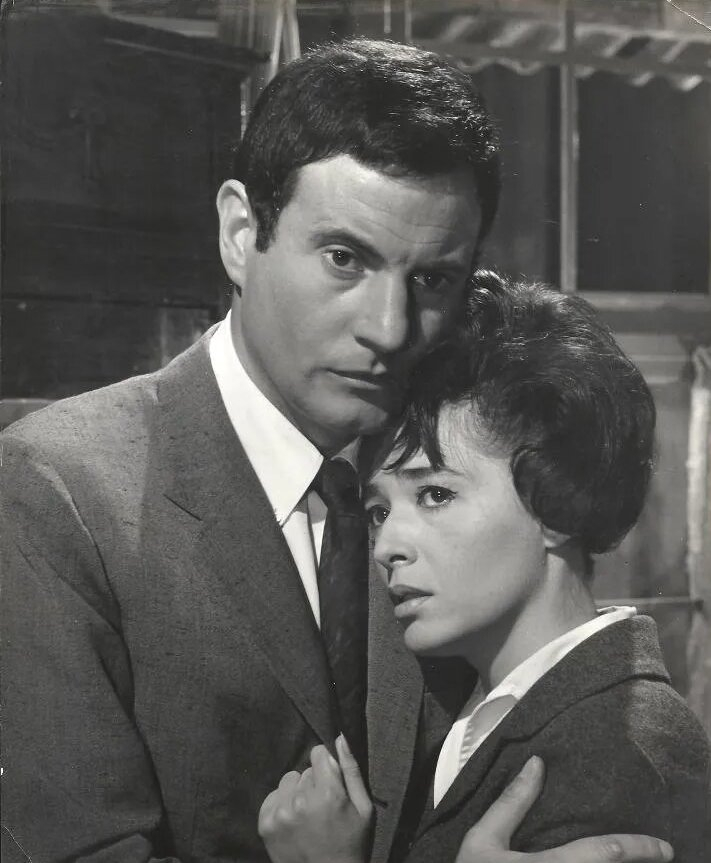
- Pina Pellicer and Arturo Fernández in a publicity photo for the film
- Directed by: Rafael Gil
- Written by: Armando Palacio Valdés (novel); Antonio Abad Ojuel; Rafael Gil
- Starring: Pina Pellicer; Arturo Fernández; Fernando Rey
- Cinematography: Michel Kelber
- Edited by: Antonio Ramírez de Loaysa
- Music by: Federico Moreno Torroba; Juan Quintero
- Production company: Coral Producciones Cinematográficas
- Distributed by: Warner Brothers
- Release date: 1962
- Running time: 98 minutes
- Country: Spain
- Language: Spanish

Rogelia is a 1962 Spanish drama film directed by Rafael Gil and starring Pina Pellicer, Arturo Fernández and Fernando Rey. It is based on Armando Palacio Valdés's 1926 novel Saint Rogelia. A 1940 film adaptation had previously been made.

== Main cast ==
- Pina Pellicer as Rogelia
- Arturo Fernández as Fernando Vilches
- Fernando Rey as Máximo García
- Mabel Karr as Cristina
- Arturo López as Pedro
- Félix de Pomés as Duque
- María Luisa Ponte as Baldomera
- Félix Fernández as Don Heliodoro
- Irán Eory as Nanette
- Rosa Palomar as Actriz en fiesta
- José María Tasso as Fotógrafo
- José María Caffarel as Director del penal
- Félix Dafauce as Don Luis
- Lola Gaos as Mendiga
- Tomás Blanco as Capitán de Regulares
- José Nieto as Preso

== Bibliography ==
- Goble, Alan. The Complete Index to Literary Sources in Film. Walter de Gruyter, 1999.
