= Autumn Days =

- Directed by: Roberto Gavaldón
- Screenplay by: Julio Alejandro; Emilio Carballido
- Based on: "Frustration" by B. Traven
- Cinematography: Gabriel Figueroa
- Release date: 31 October 1963
- Running time: 95 minutes
- Country: Mexico
- Language: Spanish

Autumn Days (Spanish: Días de otoño) is a 1963 Mexican psychological drama film directed by Roberto Gavaldón, starring Pina Pellicer, Evangelina Elizondo, Adriana Roel and Ignacio López Tarso. This film is based on the story "Frustration" by B. Traven. Pellicer received the Best Actress award at the 1964 Mar del Plata International Film Festival.

== Cast ==
- Pina Pellicer as Luisa
- Evangelina Elizondo as Rita
- Ignacio López Tarso as Albino
- Adriana Roel as Alicia
- Luis Lomelí as Carlos
- Graciela Doring as Empleada de pastelería
- Hortensia Santoveña as Doctora
- Eva Calvo as Cliente de pastelería
- Guillermo Orea as Fotógrafo
- Enrique García Álvarez as Cura
- Ricardo Fuentes as Dibujante
