= One-Eyed Jacks =

1961 film by Marlon Brando

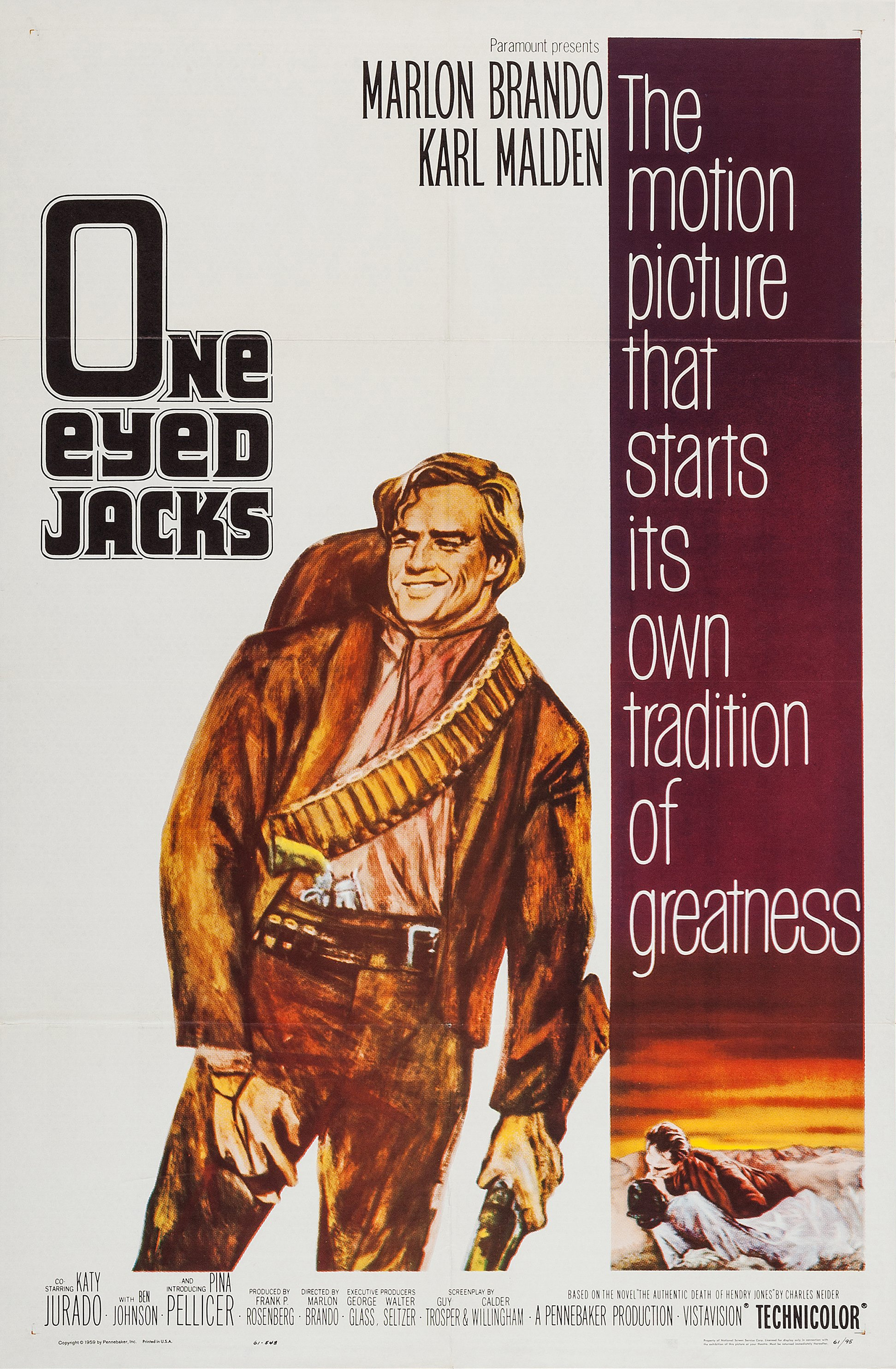
- Theatrical release poster
- Directed by: Marlon Brando
- Screenplay by: Guy Trosper; Calder Willingham; Rod Serling (Note: Serling and Peckinpah were both uncredited); Sam Peckinpah
- Based on: The Authentic Death of Hendry Jones (1956 novel) by Charles Neider
- Produced by: Frank P. Rosenberg
- Starring: Marlon Brando; Karl Malden; Katy Jurado; Ben Johnson; Pina Pellicer
- Cinematography: Charles Lang
- Edited by: Archie Marshek
- Music by: Hugo Friedhofer
- Production company: Pennebaker Productions
- Distributed by: Paramount Pictures
- Release date: March 30, 1961 (New York City)
- Running time: 141 minutes
- Country: United States
- Languages: English; Spanish
- Budget: $6 million
- Box office: $4.3 million (US/Canada rentals)

One-Eyed Jacks is a 1961 American epic Western film directed by Marlon Brando in his sole directorial credit, and starring Brando, Karl Malden, Katy Jurado, Ben Johnson and Pina Pellicer. Brando portrays a bandit seeking revenge on his former mentor who betrayed him (Malden).

Loosely based on the 1956 novel The Authentic Death of Hendry Jones, One-Eyed Jacks had a difficult production marked by clashes between Brando and multiple screenwriters and directors (including Stanley Kubrick), eventually taking over as director himself. Principal photography lasted twice its planned three months, and ran over budget. This was the last film shot in the VistaVision format until The Brutalist in 2024 and the last film projected in the format until One Battle After Another in 2025.

One-Eyed Jacks was released by Paramount Pictures on March 30, 1961. It received mixed reviews and was a commercial disappointment, though its reputation has grown over the ensuing decades. It was nominated for an Academy Award for Best Cinematography, Color, and Brando was nominated for a Directors Guild of America Award. It also won the Golden Shell at the 1961 San Sebastián International Film Festival, with Pina Pellicer winning Best Actress.

In 2018, the film was selected for preservation in the United States National Film Registry by the Library of Congress.

== Plot ==
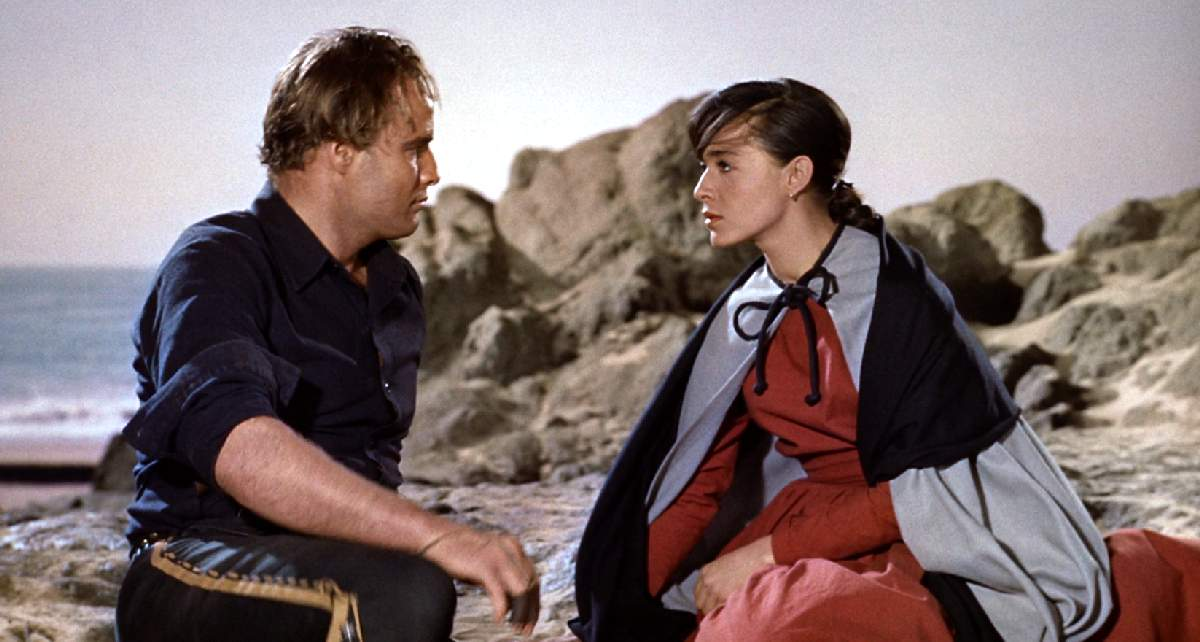

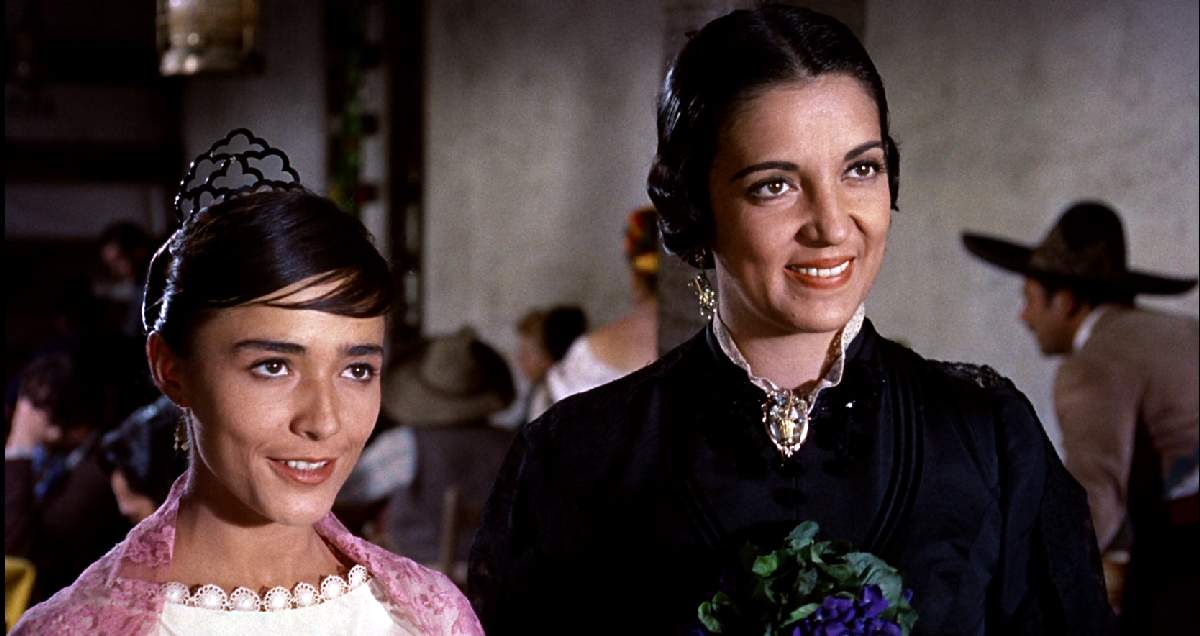
Pina Pellicer with Marlon Brando (top) and Katy Jurado (bottom)

In 1880 Sonora, Mexico, a bandit named Rio, his mentor Dad Longworth, their partner Doc rob a bank of two saddlebags of gold. Mexican rurales catch them celebrating in a cantina and kill Doc. Dad and Rio escape, but Dad leaves Rio to be taken by the rurales. Rio is arrested and imprisoned.

Five years later, Rio escapes and travels to Monterey, California, where Dad has become sheriff. Rio plans to kill Dad and rob the bank in Monterey with his new partners Chico Modesto, Harvey Johnson and Bob Emory.

Plans are sidetracked when Rio falls in love with Dad's beautiful stepdaughter, Louisa. Rio takes advantage of a festival to spend the night with her on the beach. Dad tries to punish Louisa for what happened, but backs down after intervention by his wife, Maria. Instead, he traps Rio, whips him in public, and smashes his gun hand to make sure Rio will never be able to beat him in a gunfight. While recovering from his wounds, Rio struggles with his conflicting desires to love the girl and to get revenge on her stepfather. He decides to forgo vengeance, fetch Louisa, and leave town.

Emory and Johnson kill Chico and pull off the bank job without Rio's knowledge. The heist goes wrong, and a young girl is killed. Dad accuses Rio of the crime. Dad has one last private talk with Rio, again attempting to absolve himself for all he has done. Rio replies, "You're a one-eyed jack around here, Dad, but I've seen the other side of your face". Rio tells him he had been imprisoned for the last five years, but Dad calls it a lie.

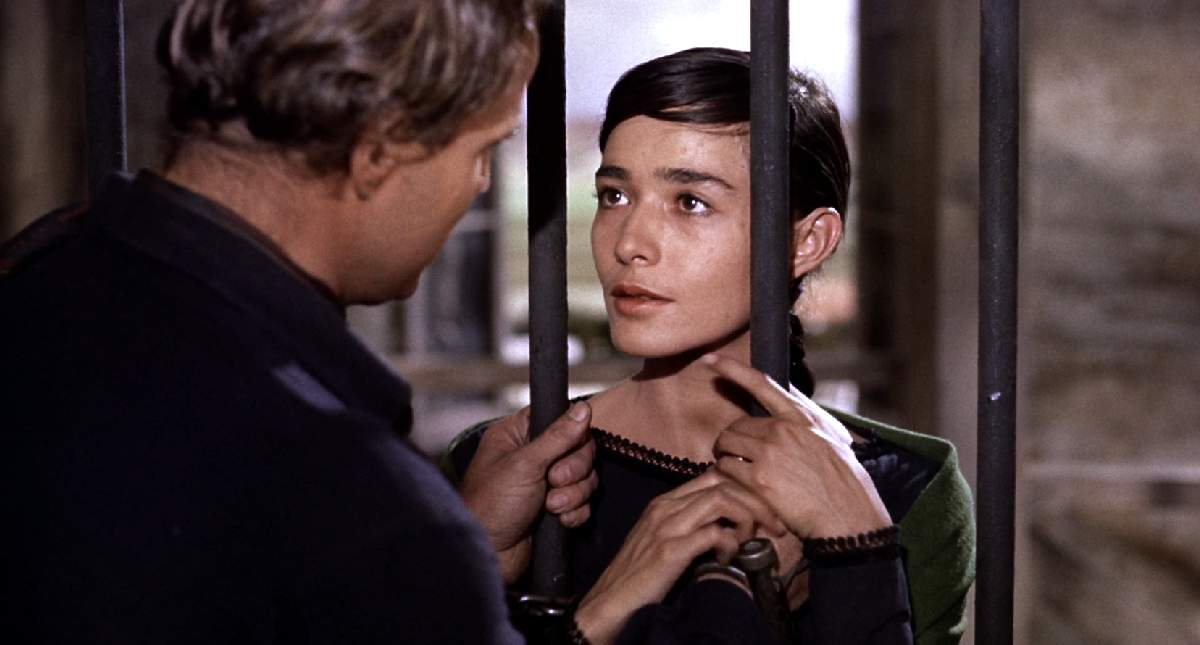
Louisa (Pina Pellicer) visits Rio (Marlon Brando) in jail

Louisa visits Rio in jail to tell him she is going to have his baby. He is then beaten by sadistic deputy Lon Dedrick, who desired and has been denied Louisa's affection. Maria confronts Dad and insists on being told the truth about the relationship between him and Rio, stating she knew something was wrong since the moment Rio arrived. She says she knows Dad wants to hang him purely out of guilt. Dad tells her she has no appreciation for everything he has done for her.

Louisa attempts to smuggle a Derringer to Rio, but she is discovered by Dedrick, who carries her out of the jail, leaving the gun on a table. While they are out, Rio is able to get hold of the pistol. Pointing the unloaded gun at Dedrick when he returns, Rio bluffs his way out of jail in a tense confrontation. Rio takes Dedrick's revolver, beats him unconscious, and locks him in a cell. As Rio is making his escape, he is spotted by Dad, riding into town. Under fire, in the final showdown Rio shoots Dad dead.

Rio and Louisa ride out to the dunes and say a sentimental farewell. Now a hunted man, Rio tells Louisa that he might go to Oregon, but will return for her in the spring.

== Cast ==
- Marlon Brando as Rio "the Kid"
- Pina Pellicer as Louisa Longworth
- Karl Malden as "Dad" Longworth
- Ben Johnson as Bob Emory
- Katy Jurado as Maria Longworth
- Slim Pickens as Lon Dedrick
- Larry Duran as Chico Modesto
- Sam Gilman as Harvey Johnson
- Timothy Carey as Howard Tetley
- Míriam Colón as Redhead
- Elisha Cook Jr. as Carvey
- Rodolfo Acosta as Mexican Rurale Captain
- Tom Webb as Farmer's Son
- Ray Teal as Barney
- John Dierkes as Chet
- Philip Ahn as Uncle
- Margarita Cordova as Nika, Flamenco Dancer
- Hank Worden as Doc

== Production ==
=== Development ===
Rod Serling, creator of The Twilight Zone television series, wrote an adaptation of the 1956 novel The Authentic Death of Hendry Jones by Charles Neider, at the request of producer Frank P. Rosenberg. The book was a fictional treatment of the familiar Billy the Kid story, relocated from New Mexico to the Monterey Peninsula in California. The adaptation was rejected.

Rosenberg next hired Sam Peckinpah, who finished his first script on 11 November 1957. Marlon Brando's Pennebacker Productions had paid $40,000 for the rights to Authentic Death and then signed a contract with Stanley Kubrick to direct for Paramount Pictures. Kubrick stepped down from directing the film in November 1958 just two weeks before starting production, reportedly to get Lolita into production. Karl Malden was offered the directorial role but declined and Brando volunteered to direct instead. Peckinpah handed in a revised screenplay on 6 May 1959. Brando later fired Peckinpah and hired Calder Willingham to further revise the film's script, but he too was eventually fired. Guy Trosper was brought on as a final replacement.

The movie ultimately bore little resemblance to the Neider novel. At various times, the two credited screenwriters and the uncredited Peckinpah have claimed (or had claimed for them) a majority of the responsibility for the film. When Karl Malden was asked who really wrote the story, he said: "There is one answer to your question—Marlon Brando, a genius in our time."

=== Casting ===
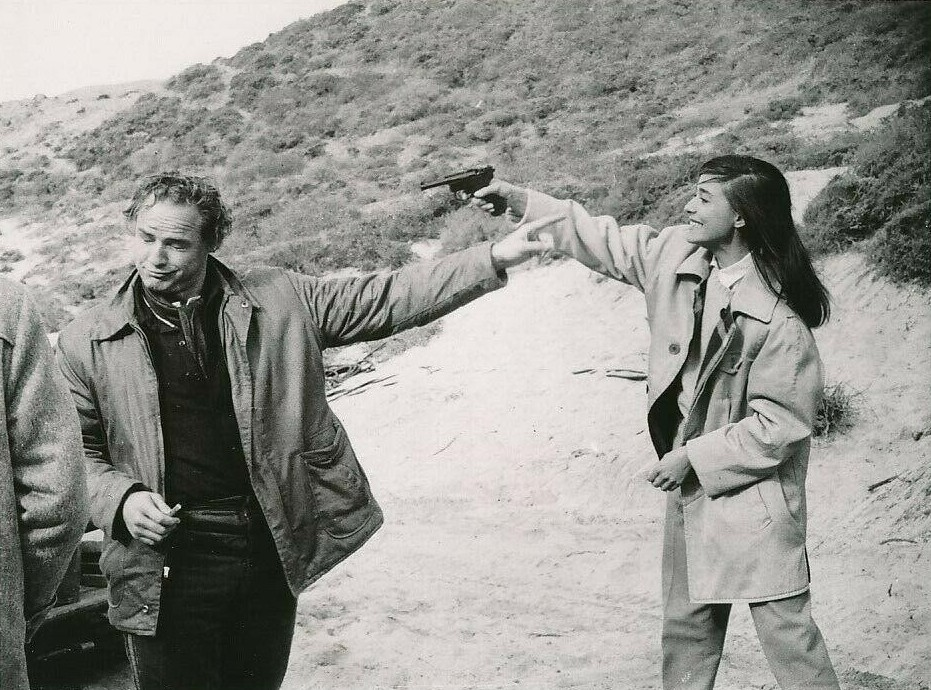
Pina Pellicer and Marlon Brando behind the scenes of the film

Spencer Tracy was Stanley Kubrick's preference for the role of Dad Longworth, but Marlon Brando had already given the role to his friend Karl Malden, who was on the payroll of Pennebaker.

=== Filming ===
Shooting took place in various locations across California and Mexico.

The movie went vastly over its $2 million budget, which was blamed on Brando's perfectionism as a director. Scheduled for a three-month shoot, principal photography on One Eyed Jacks took six months at a cost $6 million, while Brando shot 1 million feet (304,800 meters) of film. Shooting began in 1958, but the film was not released until 1961.

Brando had shot and printed a total of five hours of additional footage, which made the editing process long and laborious; some of the unused footage was later destroyed. Among the excised footage was a romantic subplot between Brando and a "niece of a Chinese fisherman", played by Lisa Lu.

Brando's initial director's cut ran 4 hours and 42 minutes, which Paramount demanded be reduced. Eventually, Brando left during post-production due to exhaustion, and the final 141 minute cut was assembled without his involvement. Brando did return to reshoot the film's ending – originally Louisa died in the climactic shootout, but Brando decided the film should have a more upbeat ending. He did not direct another film in his later years, but he did continue to act. In a 1975 Rolling Stone interview, Brando said of directing, "You work yourself to death. You're the first one up in the morning... I mean, we shot that thing on the run, you know, you make up the dialogue the scene before, improvising, and your brain is going crazy".

The film was Paramount Pictures' last feature released in VistaVision. Cinematographer Charles Lang received an Academy Award nomination in the Best Cinematography, Color category that year. Upon release, it made little money, leading to a string of unsuccessful films for Brando. It was filmed at Pebble Beach and Pfeiffer Beach.

== Release ==
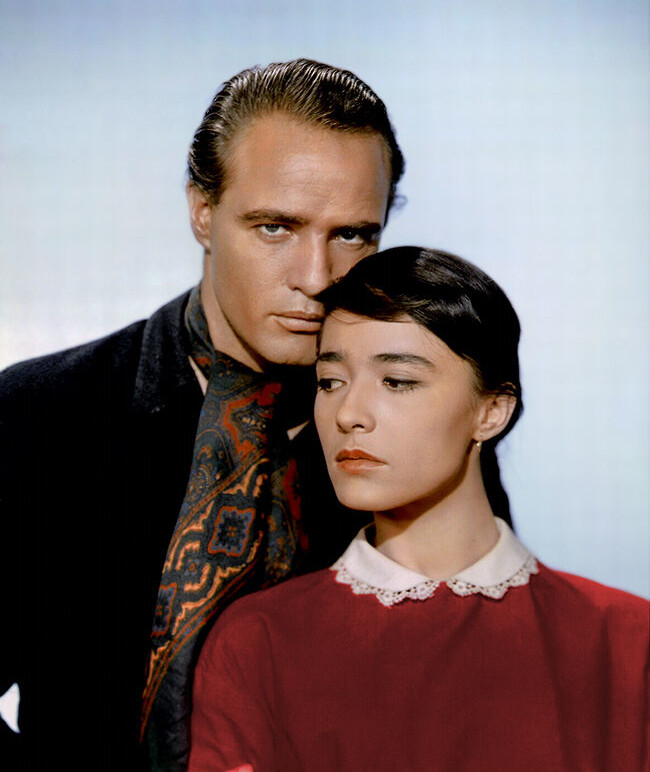
Promotional photograph for the film featuring main stars, Pina Pellicer and Marlon Brando

The film was released on March 30, 1961, in New York City.

The film was selected for screening as part of the Cannes Classics section at the 2016 Cannes Film Festival. The Cannes screening was that of a 4K restoration supervised by Martin Scorsese, Steven Spielberg, and The Film Foundation.

=== Home media and restoration ===
The film fell into the public domain and for years was only available via numerous low-quality budget reissues on VHS and DVD, along with the occasional official release by Paramount Home Video. In 2016, work was completed on a "New 4K digital restoration, undertaken by Universal Pictures in partnership with The Film Foundation and in consultation with filmmakers Martin Scorsese and Steven Spielberg". This restoration was issued on Blu-ray and DVD in November 2016 by the Criterion Collection in the US, and in June 2017 by Arrow Video in the UK.

== Reception ==
=== Critical response ===
One-Eyed Jacks received mixed reviews from critics. On the review aggregator Rotten Tomatoes, the film has a 67% approval rating based on 18 reviews.

Bosley Crowther of The New York Times, favorably influenced by Brando's efforts, noted: "Directed and played with the kind of vicious style that Mr. Brando has put into so many of his skulking, scabrous roles. Realism is redolent in them, as it is in many details of the film. But, at the same time, it is curiously surrounded by elements of creamed-cliché romance and a kind of pictorial extravagance that you usually see in South Sea island films."

Variety, on the other hand, wrote: "It is an oddity of this film that both its strength and its weakness lie in the area of characterization. Brando's concept calls, above all, for depth of character, for human figures endowed with overlapping good and bad sides to their nature." Dave Kehr of The Chicago Reader wrote: "There is a strong Freudian pull to the situation (the partner's name is "Dad") that is more ritualized than dramatized: the most memorable scenes have a fierce masochistic intensity, as if Brando were taking the opportunity to punish himself for some unknown crime."

=== Awards and nominations ===
Institution	Year	Category	Nominee(s)	Result
Academy Awards	1962	Best Cinematography, Color	Charles Lang	Nominated
Directors Guild of America	1962	Outstanding Directorial Achievement in Motion Pictures	Marlon Brando	Nominated
San Sebastián International Film Festival	1961	Golden Shell	Marlon Brando	Won
San Sebastián International Film Festival	1961	Best Actress	Pina Pellicer	Won

In 2018, the film was selected for preservation in the United States National Film Registry by the Library of Congress.

== In popular culture ==
"One-Eyed Jacks" is the name of a brothel in the TV series Twin Peaks created by David Lynch and Mark Frost. The film is mentioned in dialogue between characters Donna Hayward and Audrey Horne. Horne asks Hayward if she has heard of "One-Eyed Jacks" and Hayward responds, "Isn't that that Western with Marlon Brando?".

A short loop from the film plays on a cinema screen during a story mission in Cyberpunk 2077.

== See also ==
- List of American films of 1961
