= Podosoje, Trebinje =

Coordinates: 42.8183°N 18.2872°E

Podosoje (Trebinje)
- Village
- Location within Republika Srpska
- Country: Bosnia and Herzegovina
- Entity: Republika Srpska
- Municipality: Trebinje
- Time zone: UTC+1 (CET)
  - Summer (DST): UTC+2 (CEST)

Podosoje (Serbian Cyrillic: Подосоје) is a village in the municipality of Trebinje, Republika Srpska, Bosnia and Herzegovina.

== Notable people ==
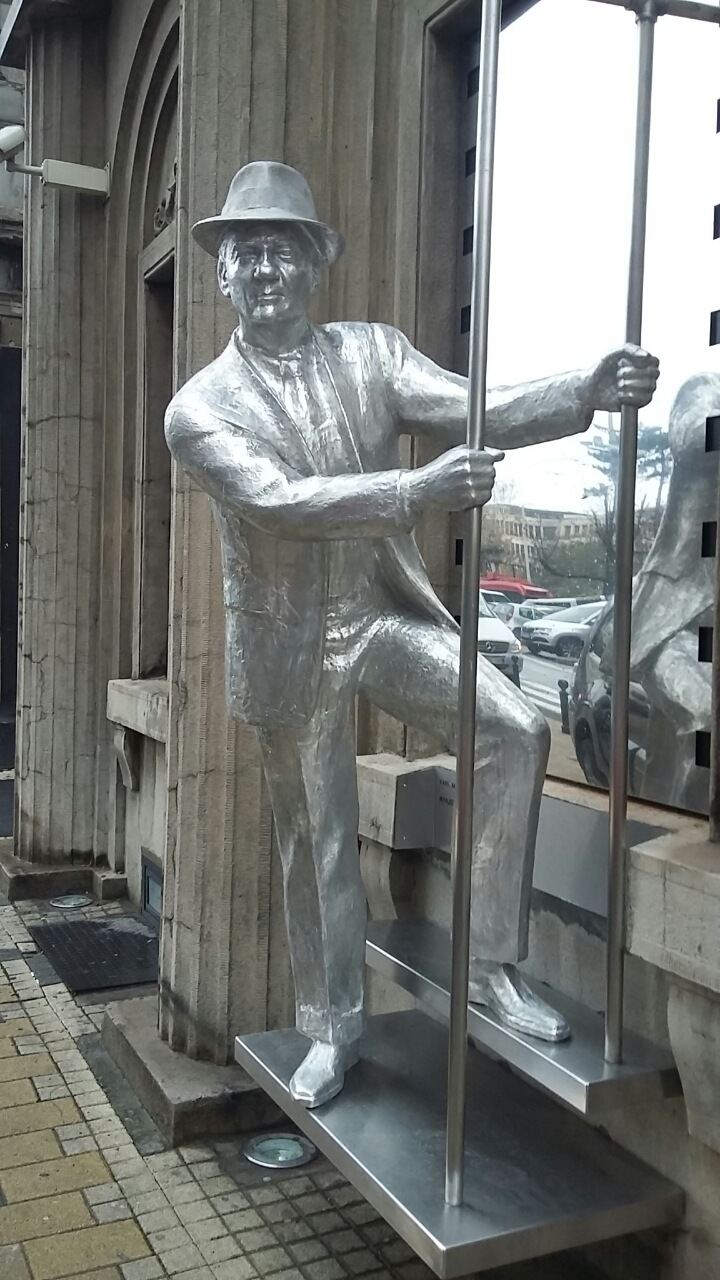
Monument to Karl Malden in Belgrade, Serbia

- Ancestral home of the Sekulovich family, of which the actor Karl Malden is the most notable.
