= Karl Malden =

American actor (1912–2009)

- Malden in The Streets of San Francisco, 1975
- Born: Mladen George Sekulovich; March 22, 1912; Chicago, Illinois, U.S.
- Died: July 1, 2009 (aged 97); Los Angeles, California, U.S.
- Resting place: Westwood Village Memorial Park Cemetery
- Education: Emerson School for Visual and Performing Arts; DePaul University
- Occupation: Actor
- Years active: 1937–2000
- Height: 1.85 m (6 ft 1 in)
- Spouse: Mona Greenberg (m. 1938)
- Children: 2
- Awards: Awards and recognition
- Military career
- Allegiance: United States
- Branch: United States Army Air Forces
- Service years: 1942–1946
- Rank: Sergeant
- Unit: Eighth Air Force
- Conflicts: World War II
- Awards: Air Force Presidential Unit Citation; American Campaign Medal; World War II Victory Medal

Karl Malden (born Mladen George Sekulovich; March 22, 1912 – July 1, 2009) was an American stage, movie, and television actor who first achieved acclaim in the original Broadway productions of Arthur Miller's All My Sons and Tennessee Williams' A Streetcar Named Desire in 1946 and 1947. Recreating the role of Mitch in the 1951 film of Streetcar, he won the Academy Award for Best Supporting Actor.

Malden was primarily a character actor, who according to Robert Berkvist, "for more than 60 years brought an intelligent intensity and a homespun authenticity to roles in theater, film, and television", especially in such classic films as A Streetcar Named Desire and On the Waterfront (1954), for which he received a second Oscar nomination for Best Supporting Actor.

He also played in high-profile Hollywood films such as I Confess (1953), Baby Doll (1956), The Hanging Tree (1959), Pollyanna (1960), One-Eyed Jacks (1961), How the West Was Won (1962), Gypsy (1962), Cheyenne Autumn (1964), Birdman of Alcatraz (1962), and Patton (1970). From 1972 to 1977, he portrayed the leading role of Lt. Mike Stone in the primetime television crime drama The Streets of San Francisco. He was later an advertising spokesman for American Express.

Film and culture critic Charles Champlin described Malden as "an Everyman, but one whose range moved easily up and down the levels of society and the IQ scale, from heroes to heavies and ordinary, decent guys just trying to get along", and at the time of his death, Malden was described as "one of the great character actors of his time" who created a number of "powerhouse performances on screen".

Malden served as president of the Academy of Motion Picture Arts and Sciences from 1989 to 1992.

== Early life ==
Karl Malden, the eldest of three sons, was born Mladen Sekulovich (Serbian Cyrillic: Младен Секуловић) in Chicago, Illinois, on March 22, 1912, his mother's 20th birthday. He was raised in a home at 457 Connecticut Street in Gary, Indiana.

His Serb father Petar Sekulović (Serbian: Петар Секуловић; 1886–1975) worked in the steel mills and as a milkman, and his mother, Minnie (née Sebera) Sekulovich (March 22, 1892 – July 15, 1995), was a Czech seamstress and actress. The Sekulovich family's roots trace back to Podosoje near Trebinje, Bosnia and Herzegovina. Malden spoke only Serbian until he was in kindergarten; he remained fluent in the language until his death. Malden's father, who had a passion for music, organized the Serbian Singing Federation, uniting immigrant choral ensembles across the United States.

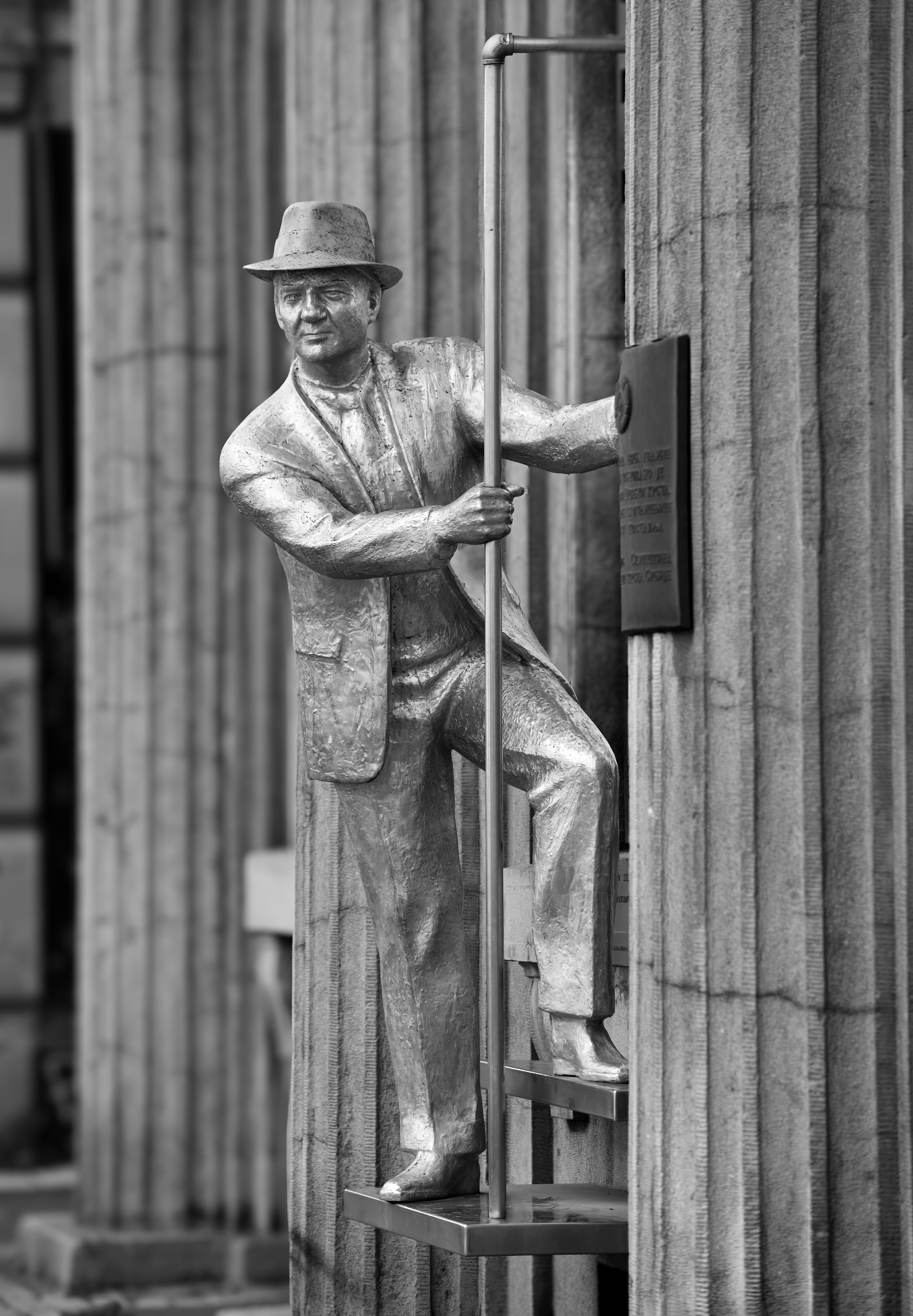
Monument to Karl Malden in Belgrade, Serbia

As a teenager, Malden joined the Karageorge Choir and acted in church plays produced by his father. He took part in many of these plays, which included a version of Jack and the Beanstalk, but mostly centered on the community's Serbian heritage. In high school, he was a popular student and the star of the basketball team (according to his autobiography, Malden broke his nose twice while playing, taking elbows to the face and resulting in his trademark bulbous nose).

He participated in the drama department and was narrowly elected senior class president. Among other roles, he played Pooh-Bah in The Mikado. After graduating from Emerson High School in 1931 with high marks, he briefly planned to leave Gary for Arkansas, where he hoped to win an athletic scholarship, but college officials did not admit him owing to his refusal to play any sport besides basketball. From 1931 until 1934, he worked in the steel mills, as had his father.

He changed his name from Mladen Sekulovich to Karl Malden at age 22, something director Elia Kazan urged him to do. He anglicized his first name by swapping its letters "l" and "a" and used it as his last and taking his grandfather's first name as his own. This was because the first theatre company he was in wanted him to shorten his name for its marquee. He thought that they wanted to fire him and were using his name as an excuse; although that was not the case, he still changed his name to give them no excuse.

Malden later stated that he regretted changing his name and tried to insert the name Sekulovich wherever possible in his work. For example, as General Omar Bradley in Patton, as his troops slog their way through enemy fire in Sicily, Malden says "Hand me that helmet, Sekulovich" to another soldier. In Dead Ringer, as a police detective in the squad room, Malden tells another detective: "Sekulovich, gimme my hat." In Fear Strikes Out, Malden, playing Jimmy Piersall's father John, introduces Jimmy to a baseball scout named Sekulovich. In Birdman of Alcatraz, as a prison warden touring the cell block, Malden recites a list of inmates' names, including Sekulovich (Malden's father was not pleased, as he told his son "Mladen, no Sekulovich has ever been in prison!"). In On the Waterfront, in which Malden plays the priest, among the names of the officers of Local 374 called out in the courtroom scene is Mladen Sekulovich, Delegate (played by Fred Gwynne). Perhaps the most notable usage of his real name, however, was in the television series The Streets of San Francisco, where Malden's character, Mike Stone, employed a legman (played by Art Passarella) with that name.

== Education and early stage work ==
In September 1934, Malden left Gary, Indiana, to pursue formal dramatic training at the Goodman School (later part of DePaul University), then associated with the Goodman Theater in Chicago. Although he had worked in the steel mills in Gary for three years, he had helped support his family and was consequently unable to save enough money to pay for his schooling. Making a deal with the director of the program, he gave the institute the little money that he did have, with the director agreeing that, if Malden did well, he would be rewarded with a full scholarship. He won the scholarship.

When Malden performed in the Goodman's children's theater, he wooed actress Mona Greenberg (stage name: Mona Graham), who married him in 1938. He graduated from the Chicago Art Institute in 1937. Soon after, without work or money, Malden returned to his hometown.

== Acting career around World War II ==
Malden eventually traveled to New York City, and he first appeared as an actor on Broadway in 1937. He did some radio work and then made his film debut with a small role in They Knew What They Wanted.

Malden also joined the Group Theatre, where he began acting in many plays and was introduced to a young Elia Kazan, who later worked with him on A Streetcar Named Desire (1951), On the Waterfront (1954), and Baby Doll (1956).

His acting career was interrupted in 1942 by the Second World War, during which he served as a noncommissioned officer in the 8th Air Force of the United States Army Air Forces . While in the service, he was given a small role in the Army Air Forces play and film Winged Victory. Malden was discharged in 1946 as a sergeant and was awarded the Army Presidential Unit Citation, the American Campaign Medal, and the World War II Victory Medal.

After the war, Malden resumed his acting career on Broadway, playing yet another small supporting role in the short-lived Maxwell Anderson play Truckline Cafe (1946), with a then-unknown Marlon Brando. The next year, director Elia Kazan gave Malden a co-starring role in Arthur Miller's breakout play All My Sons. By the end of that year, he had joined the legendary original cast of Tennessee Williams's landmark drama A Streetcar Named Desire, also directed by Kazan, playing Harold "Mitch" Mitchell. With that high-profile theatre success, he then crossed over into steady film work.

== Film career: 1950s to 1970s ==
Malden appeared in a small role in the film noir Kiss of Death (1947) during the run of All My Sons, but did not resume his film acting career until 1950, starting with The Gunfighter and Where the Sidewalk Ends, followed by Halls of Montezuma (1951). For Kazan's film version of A Streetcar Named Desire (also 1951), he recreated his role as Harold "Mitch" Mitchell, Stanley Kowalski's best friend, who starts a romance with Blanche DuBois (Vivien Leigh). For this performance, he won the Academy Award for Best Supporting Actor. His other films during this period included Alfred Hitchcock's I Confess (1953) with Montgomery Clift and Anne Baxter, and On the Waterfront (1954) — from which he received his second nomination for the Oscar for Best Supporting Actor — playing a priest who influences Terry Malloy (Marlon Brando) to testify against mobster-union boss Johnny Friendly (Lee J. Cobb).

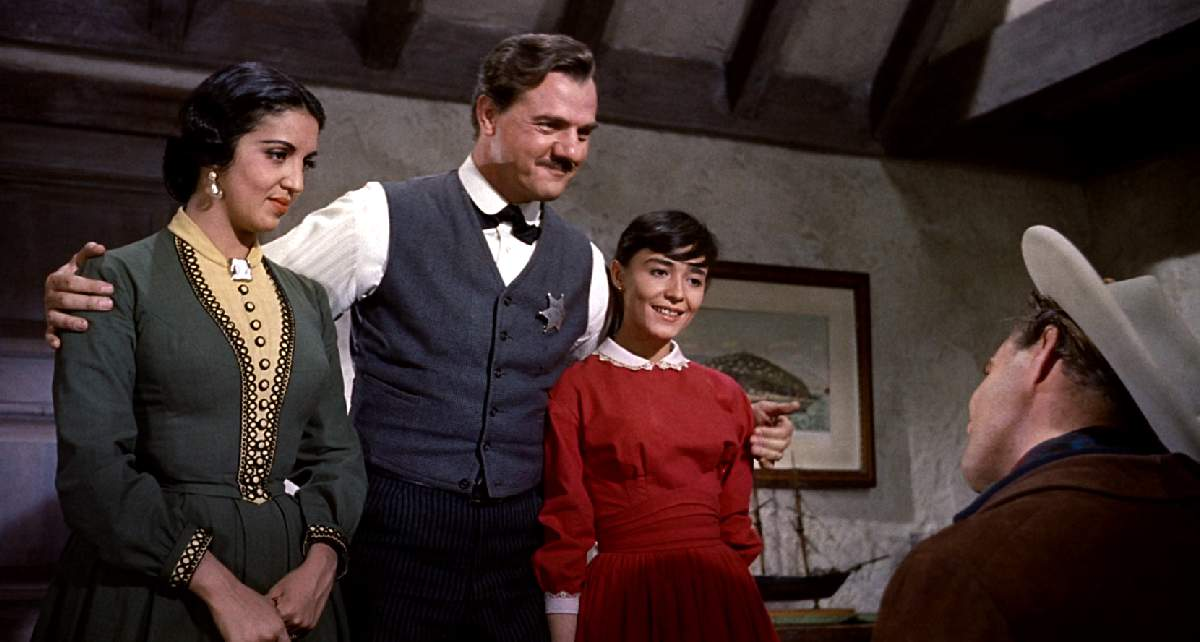
Malden hugging actresses Pina Pellicer (right) and Katy Jurado (left) while they stare at Marlon Brando in One-Eyed Jacks (1961)

In Baby Doll (1956), Malden's last collaboration with Kazan, he played the leading role, a man sexually frustrated by a teenaged wife. The film was condemned by the Legion of Decency and did not air long. He also played the lead in Bombers B-52 (1957), but most of his film work was in supporting roles.

He co-starred in dozens of films from the late 1950s to the early 1970s, such as Fear Strikes Out and Time Limit (both 1957). The latter picture was Malden's only directing credit of a film, but when Delmer Daves was taken ill during the shooting of The Hanging Tree (1959), Malden assumed direction of the movie for two weeks. He also starred in Pollyanna (1960), One-Eyed Jacks (1961) (working again with Brando), Birdman of Alcatraz, Gypsy, How the West Was Won (all 1962), The Cincinnati Kid (1965), and Patton (1970), in which he portrayed General Omar Bradley.

Malden's wife, Mona (the former Mildred Greenberg), graduated from Roosevelt High School in Emporia, Kansas, where she attended Kansas State Teachers College, now Emporia State University. He first visited the campus with her in 1959 and was impressed by the ESU Summer Theatre. He returned there in the summer of 1964 to teach, working with the actors in the company. Upon leaving, he gave his honorarium to establish the Karl Malden Theater Scholarship at ESU, still awarded there today.

In 1963, Malden was a member of the jury at the 13th Berlin International Film Festival.

== Television work ==
=== The Streets of San Francisco (1972–1977) ===
In 1972, producer Quinn Martin gave Malden the role of Lt. Mike Stone in The Streets of San Francisco. Although the concept originated as a made-for-television movie, ABC quickly signed on to carry it as a series. Michael Douglas played Lt. Stone's young partner, Inspector Steve Keller.

Malden's character Stone was a widowed cop with more than 20 years of experience, who is paired with Keller, a recently graduated officer. During its first season, The Streets of San Francisco was a ratings winner among many other 1970s crime dramas. For his work as Lt. Stone, Malden was nominated for a Primetime Emmy Award for Outstanding Lead Actor in a Drama Series four times between 1974 and 1977, though he never won. After two episodes in the fifth season, Douglas left the show to act in movies; Lt. Stone's new partner was Inspector Dan Robbins, played by Richard Hatch. The show took a ratings nosedive after being rescheduled against another Quinn Martin series on CBS, Barnaby Jones, and ABC cancelled the series after five seasons and 120 episodes.

=== Later TV roles ===
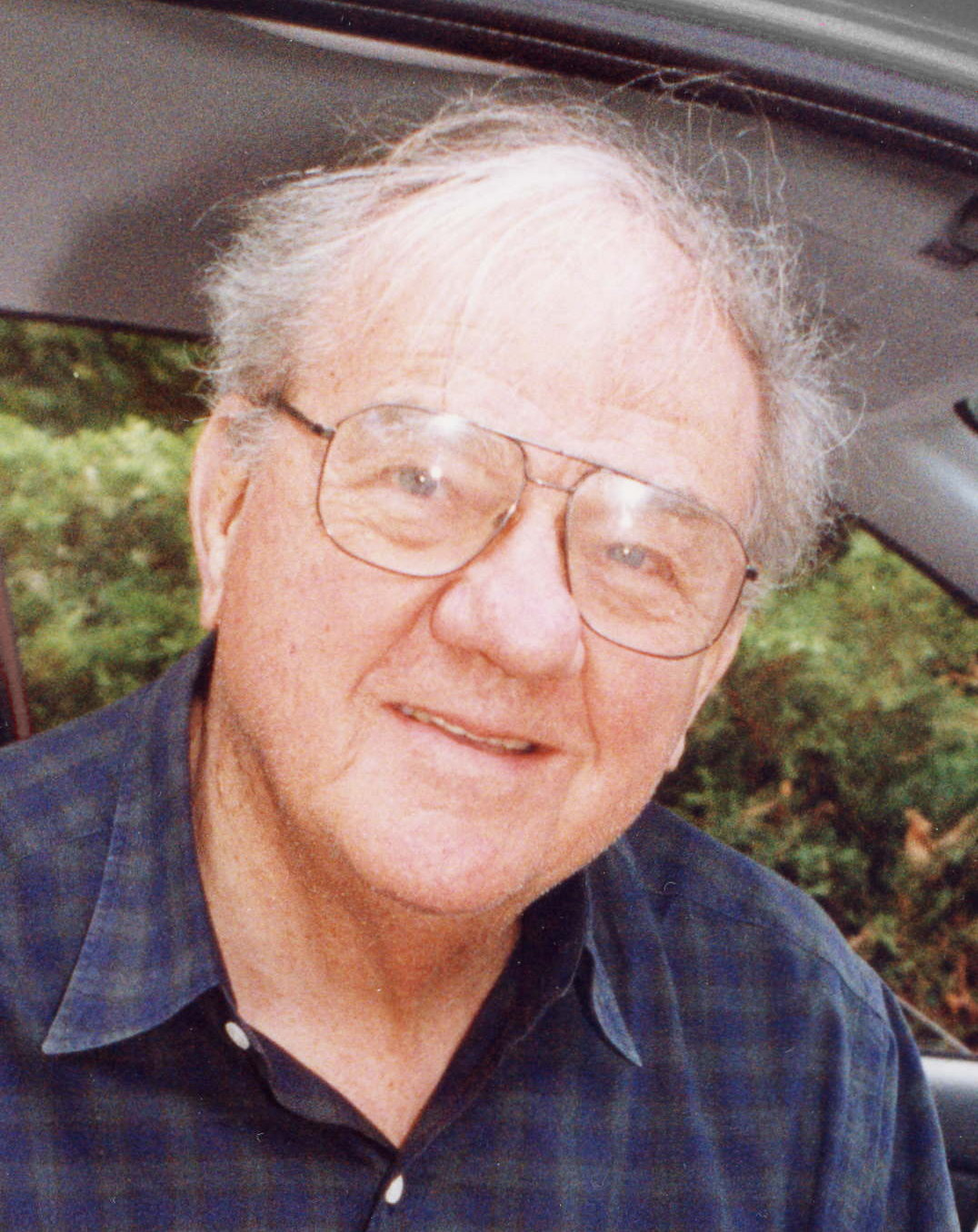
Malden in 1996

In 1980, Malden starred in Skag, an hour-long drama that focused on the life of a foreman at a Pittsburgh steel mill. Malden described his character, Pete Skagska, as a simple man trying to keep his family together. The pilot episode for the series featured Skag temporarily disabled by a stroke, and it explored the effects the stroke had on Skag's family and co-workers. While Skag met with poor ratings, critics praised it; the series was cancelled after six episodes.

In 1981, Malden portrayed ice hockey coach Herb Brooks in a made-for-television account of the United States men's national ice hockey team's miraculous gold medal-winning run in the 1980 Winter Olympics. Malden told Sports Illustrated in December 1980 that he had never actually met Herb Brooks in preparation for his portrayal of him, but he studied him on videotape, especially his eyes. Malden said of Brooks "I'd hate to meet him in a dark alley. I think he's a little on the neurotic side. Maybe more than a little. Any moment you think he's going to jump out of his skin." Malden also remarked with disapproval that Brooks could have ventured an occasional smile during one of the less intense games. Malden also wondered how, after working hard over the course of seven months, Brooks could have simply walked away towards the team dressing room after his team clinched the improbable victory against the Soviet team.

In 1987, Malden was the host/narrator for the second and third television specials that later became the long-running series Unsolved Mysteries.

In the 1989 TV movie The Hijacking of the Achille Lauro, Malden portrayed Leon Klinghoffer, the only person to die in the 1985 terrorist incident.

His last acting role was in 2000 in the first-season episode of The West Wing titled "Take This Sabbath Day" in which he portrayed a Catholic priest, using the same Bible he had used in On the Waterfront.

== Other work ==
Malden delivered the line, "Don't leave home without them!" in a series of U.S. television commercials for American Express traveler's cheques in the 1970s and 1980s. He also advertised the American Express card, with the famous opening line, "Do you know me?" These ads were occasionally spoofed on The Tonight Show Starring Johnny Carson.

From 1990 to 2009, Malden was a member of the United States Postal Service's Citizens' Stamp Advisory Committee, which evaluates potential subjects for U.S. postage stamps and reports its recommendations to the postmaster general.

== Personal life ==
On December 18, 1938, Malden married Mona Greenberg (May 9, 1917 – July 13, 2019), who survived him. Their marriage was one of the longest in Hollywood's history, with their 70th wedding anniversary occurring in December 2008. In addition to his wife, Malden was survived by his daughters Mila and Carla and his son-in-law Tom. His other son-in-law Laurence predeceased him in 2007. Malden's mother lived to 103 years of age.

In 1997, Malden published his autobiography, When Do I Start?, written with his daughter Carla.

== Death ==
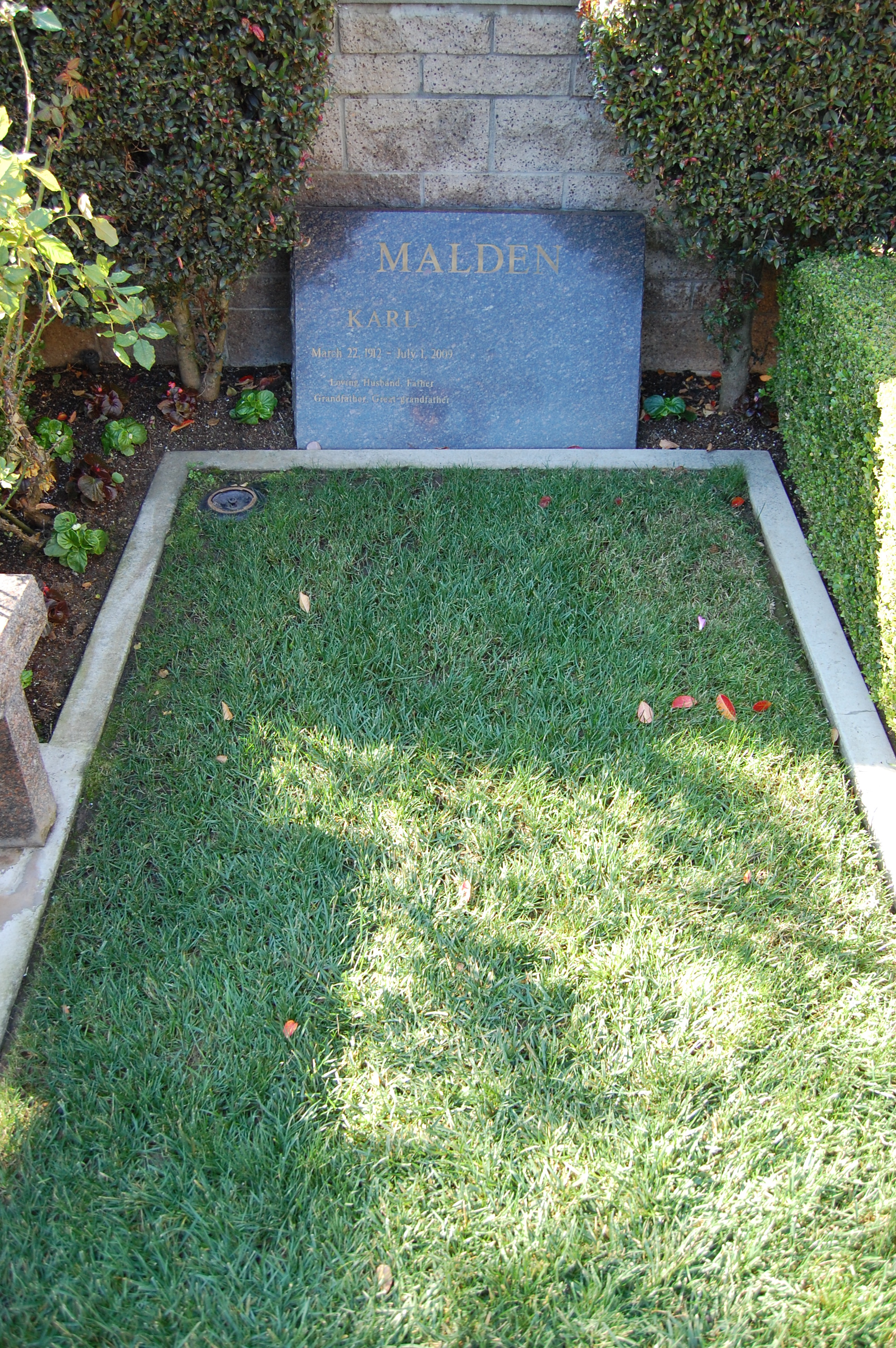
Karl Malden's grave at Westwood Village Memorial Park Cemetery

Malden died at his home in Los Angeles on July 1, 2009, at the age of 97. He was reported to have been in poor health for several years. He is buried at the Westwood Village Memorial Park Cemetery in Los Angeles. He died on the same day as his frequent co-star Marlon Brando, who had died 5 years prior.

Malden's friend and former co-star Michael Douglas wrote a tribute to Malden for Time's "Milestones" section.

== Awards and recognition ==
Malden won the Academy Award for Best Supporting Actor in 1952 for A Streetcar Named Desire and was nominated in 1955 for his supporting role in On the Waterfront. Malden was president of the Academy of Motion Picture Arts and Sciences from 1989 to 1992. In October 2003, he was named the 40th recipient of the Screen Actors' Guild's Life Achievement Award for career achievement and humanitarian accomplishment.

In 1985, Malden won an Emmy Award for Outstanding Supporting Actor in a Limited Series for his performance as Freddy Kassab in Fatal Vision. The same year, he was also awarded an honorary doctoral degree in fine arts by Emporia State University.

In May 2001, Malden received an honorary degree, doctor of humane letters, from Valparaiso University. Michael Douglas presented Malden with a lifetime achievement award from the Screen Actors Guild on February 22, 2004. On November 11, 2004, Douglas also presented Malden with the Monte Cristo Award of the Eugene O'Neill Theater Center in Waterford, Connecticut, which is given for "distinguished careers exemplifying Eugene O'Neill's standard of excellence and pioneering spirit." Among other past winners were Jason Robards, Zoe Caldwell, Edward Albee, August Wilson, and Brian Dennehy.

On November 12, 2005, the United States House of Representatives authorized the United States Postal Service to rename the Los Angeles Barrington Postal Station as the Karl Malden Postal Station in honor of Malden's achievements. The bill, H.R. 3667, was sponsored by Representatives Henry Waxman and Diane Watson.

For his contribution to the film industry, Malden has a star on the Hollywood Walk of Fame at 6231 Hollywood Blvd. In 2005, he was inducted into the Western Performers Hall of Fame at the National Cowboy & Western Heritage Museum in Oklahoma City, Oklahoma. In November 2018, a monument to Karl Malden was dedicated in Belgrade, Serbia.

=== Decorations ===
Award or decoration	Country	Date	Place
Medal of the White Angel	Serbia and Montenegro	2004	Belgrade
Order of Saint Sava (First Grade)	Serbian Orthodox Church	October 6, 2004	Belgrade

== Filmography ==
=== Film ===
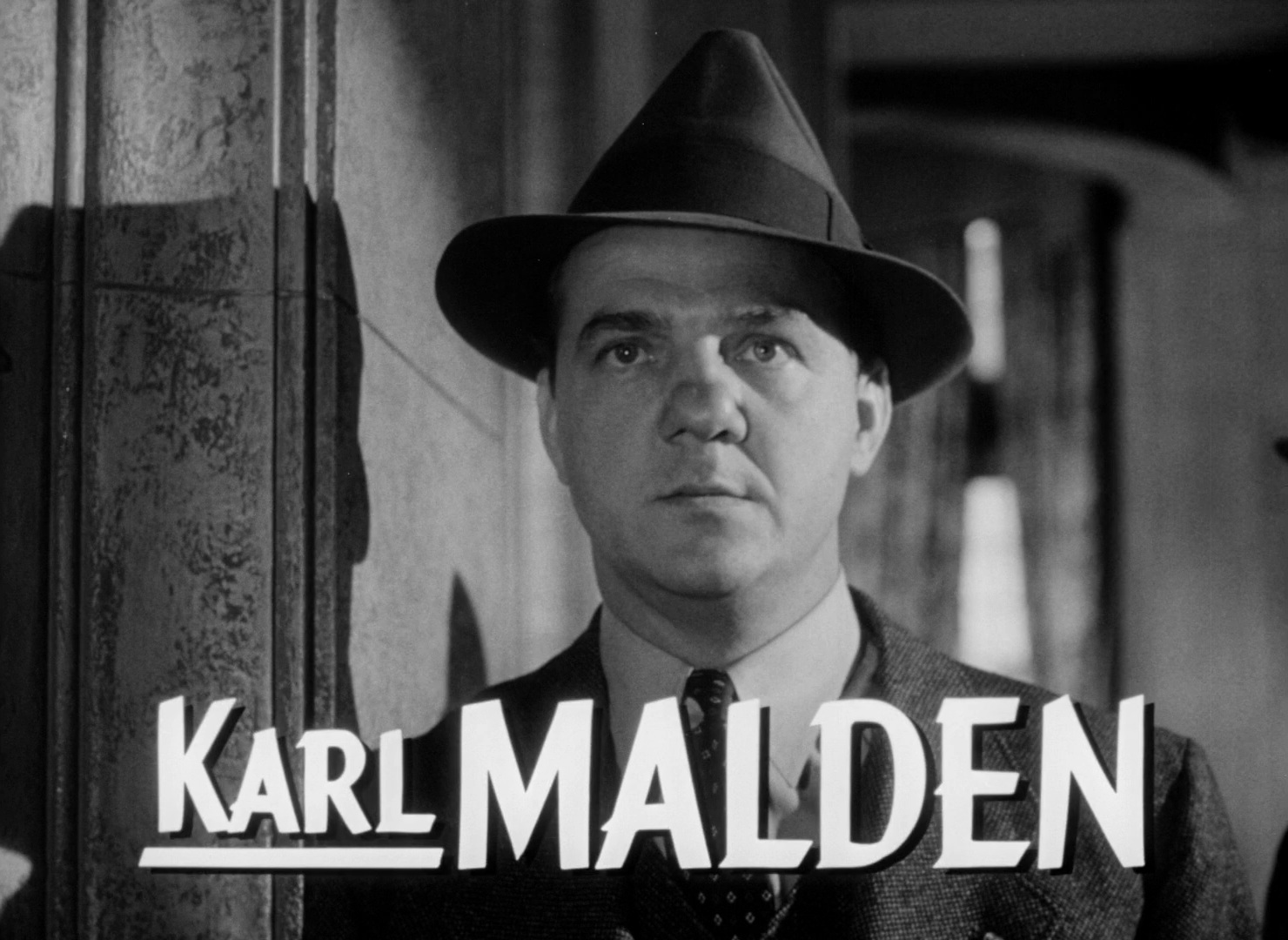
Malden in the trailer for I Confess (1953)

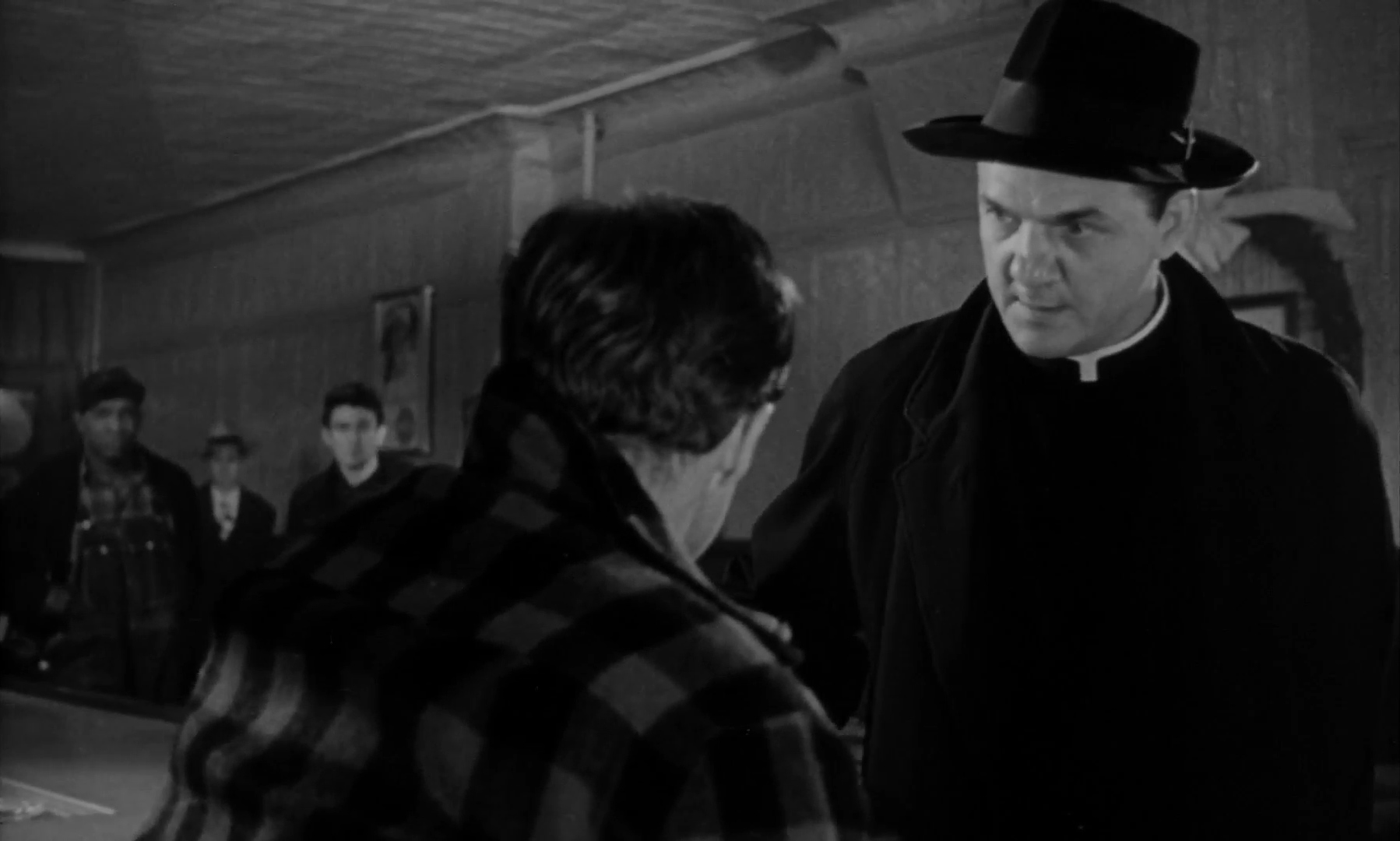
Malden with Marlon Brando in the trailer for On the Waterfront (1954)

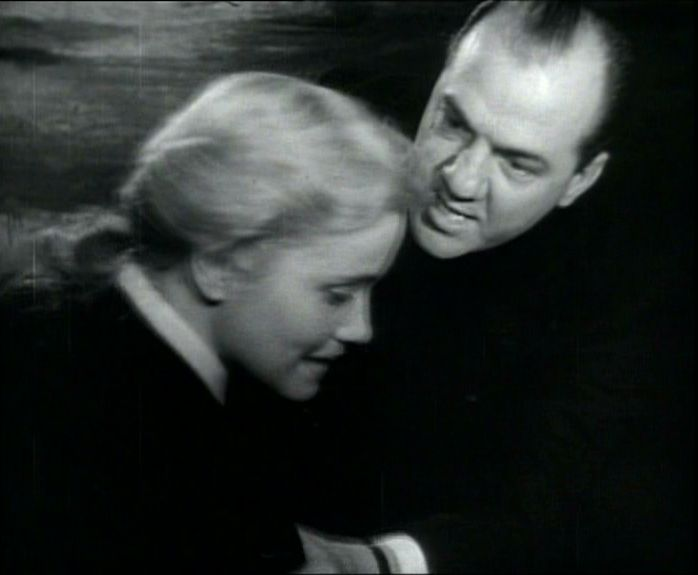
Malden with Eva Marie Saint in the trailer for On the Waterfront (1954)

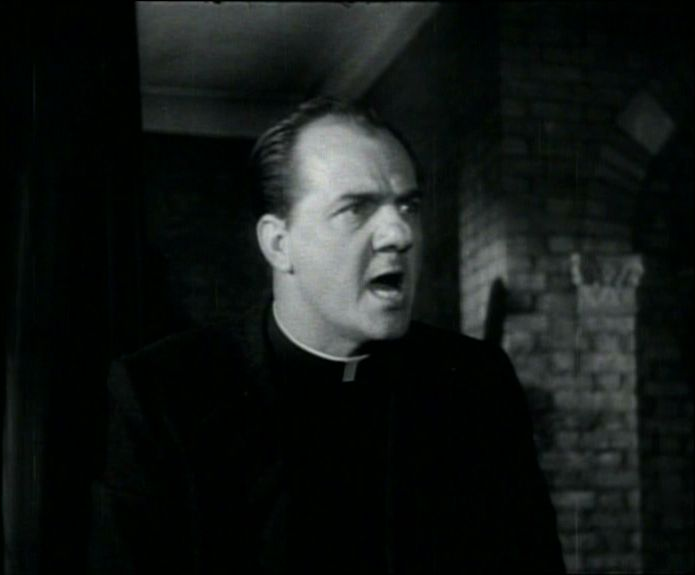
Malden as Father Barry in the trailer for On the Waterfront (1954)

Year	Title	Role	Notes
1940	They Knew What They Wanted	Red	Film debut
1944	Winged Victory	Adams	
1946	13 Rue Madeleine	Jump Master	Uncredited
1947	Boomerang	Detective Lieutenant White	Uncredited
1947	Kiss of Death	Sergeant William Cullen	
1950	The Gunfighter	Mac	
1950	Where the Sidewalk Ends	Lieutenant Thomas	
1951	Halls of Montezuma	Doc	
1951	A Streetcar Named Desire	Harold 'Mitch' Mitchell	Academy Award for Best Supporting Actor
1952	The Sellout	Captain Buck Maxwell	
1952	Diplomatic Courier	Sergeant Ernie Guelvada	
1952	Operation Secret	Major Latrec	
1952	Ruby Gentry	Jim Gentry	
1953	I Confess	Inspector Larrue	
1953	Take the High Ground!	Sergeant Laverne Holt	
1954	Phantom of the Rue Morgue	Dr. Marais	
1954	On the Waterfront	Father Barry	Nominated—Academy Award for Best Supporting Actor
1956	Baby Doll	Archie Lee Meighan	Nominated—Golden Globe Award for Best Actor - Motion Picture Drama; Nominated—BAFTA Film Award (Best Foreign Actor)
1957	Fear Strikes Out	John Piersall	
1957	Time Limit	Prisoner	Uncredited; Malden's only directing credit
1957	Bombers B-52	Master Sergeant Chuck V. Brennan	
1959	The Hanging Tree	Frenchy Plante	Also directed but was not credited
1960	Pollyanna	Reverend Paul Ford	
1961	The Great Impostor	Father Devlin	
1961	One-Eyed Jacks	Sheriff Dad Longworth	
1961	Parrish	Judd Raike	
1962	All Fall Down	Ralph Willart	
1962	Birdman of Alcatraz	Harvey Shoemaker	
1962	Gypsy	Herbie Sommers	Nominated—Golden Globe Award for Best Actor – Motion Picture Musical or Comedy
1962	How the West Was Won	Zebulon Prescott	
1963	Come Fly with Me	Walter Lucas	
1964	Dead Ringer	Sergeant Jim Hobbson	
1964	Cheyenne Autumn	Captain Wessels	
1965	The Cincinnati Kid	Shooter	
1966	Nevada Smith	Tom Fitch	
1966	Murderers' Row	Julian Wall	
1967	Hotel	Keycase Milne	
1967	The Adventures of Bullwhip Griffin	Judge Higgins	
1967	Billion Dollar Brain	Leo Newbigen	
1968	Blue	Doc Morton	
1968	Hot Millions	Carlton J. Klemper	
1970	Patton	General Omar N. Bradley	
1971	The Cat o' Nine Tails	Franco Arnò	
1971	Wild Rovers	Walter Buckman	
1972	Summertime Killer	Captain John Kiley	
1979	Beyond the Poseidon Adventure	Wilbur Hubbard	
1979	Meteor	Harry Sherwood	
1982	Twilight Time	Marko Sekulovic	
1983	The Sting II	Gus Macalinski	
1986	Billy Galvin	Jack Galvin	
1987	Nuts	Arthur Kirk	

=== Television ===
Year	Title	Role	Notes
1949	The Ford Theatre Hour	Friedrich Bhaer	Episode: "Little Women"
1950	Armstrong Circle Theatre	Himself	Episode: "Anything But Love"
1952	Celanese Theatre	Himself	Episode: "The Animal Kingdom"
1972–1977	The Streets of San Francisco	Detective Lieutenant Mike Stone	120 episodes Nominated—Primetime Emmy Award for Outstanding Lead Actor in a Drama Series (1974–1977); Nominated—Golden Globe Award for Best Actor - Television Series Drama (1976)
1977	Captains Courageous	Disko Troop	TV movie
1980	Skag	Pete 'Skag' Skagska	6 episodes
1981	Word of Honor	Mike McNeill	TV movie
1981	Miracle on Ice	Herb Brooks	TV movie
1984	With Intent to Kill	Thomas E. Nolan	TV movie
1984	Fatal Vision	Freddy Kassab	TV miniseries Primetime Emmy Award for Outstanding Supporting Actor in a Limited Series
1985	Alice in Wonderland	The Walrus	TV movie
1988	My Father, My Son	Elmo Zumwalt Jr.	TV movie
1989	The Hijacking of the Achille Lauro	Leon Klinghoffer	TV movie
1990	Call Me Anna	Dr. Harold Arlen	TV movie
1991	Absolute Strangers	Fred Zusselman	TV movie
1992	Back to the Streets of San Francisco	Mike Stone	TV movie
1993	Vanished Without a Trace	Ed Ray	TV movie
1995	Biography	P. T. Barnum (voice)	TV series documentary
1998	The Lionhearts	(voice)	Episode: "Brown Dog Day"
2000	The West Wing	Father Thomas Cavanaugh	Episode: "Take This Sabbath Day" (final appearance)

== Radio appearances ==
Year	Program	Episode/source
1952	Theatre Guild on the Air	Lilim

Non-profit organization positions
Preceded by Richard Kahn	President of the Academy of Motion Picture Arts and Sciences; 1989–1992	Succeeded by Robert Rehme
