= Katy Jurado =

Mexican actress (1924–2002)

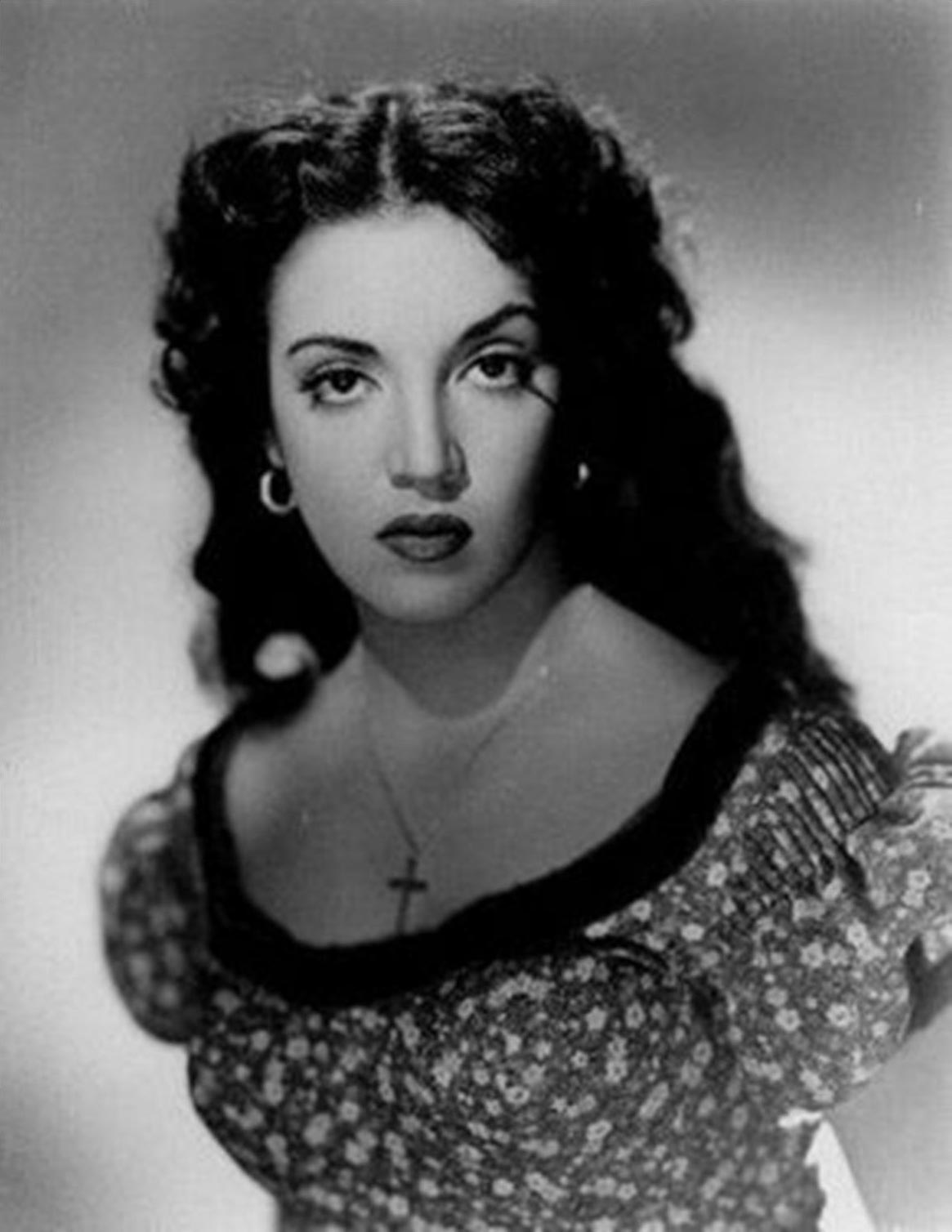
- Jurado in 1953
- Born: María Cristina Estela Marcela Jurado García; 16 January 1924; Mexico City, Mexico
- Died: 5 July 2002 (aged 78); Cuernavaca, Mexico
- Resting place: Panteón de la Paz, Cuernavaca, Mexico
- Occupation: Actor
- Years active: 1943–2002
- Spouses: Víctor Velázquez (m. 1939; div. 1943) Ernest Borgnine (m. 1959; div. 1963)
- Children: 2

María Cristina Estela Marcela Jurado García (16 January 1924 – 5 July 2002), known professionally as Katy Jurado (/dʒəˈrɑːdoʊ/ jə-RAH-doh, Spanish: [ˈkati xuˈɾaðo]), was a Mexican actress. She followed in the footsteps of earlier Mexican actresses in Hollywood, including Dolores Del Rio, Lupe Velez, and María Félix. And her talent for playing a variety of characters helped to promote later Mexican actresses in American cinema. She acted in popular Western films of the 1950s and 1960s. She was the first Latin American actress nominated for an Oscar, as Best Supporting Actress for her work in Broken Lance (1954), and was the first to win a Golden Globe Award, for her performance in High Noon (1952).

== Life and career ==
=== 1924–1943: Childhood and early years ===
María Cristina Estela Marcela Jurado García, known from early childhood as "Katy", was born on 16 January 1924, in Mexico City, Mexico, the daughter of Luis Jurado Ochoa, a lawyer, and Vicenta García, a singer. Jurado's younger brothers were Luis Raúl and Óscar Sergio.

Her mother was a singer who worked for the Mexican radio station XEW (the oldest radio station in Hispanic America). Her mother was sister of Mexican musician Belisario de Jesús García, author of popular Mexican songs such as "Las Cuatro Milpas". Jurado's cousin Emilio Portes Gil was president of Mexico (1928–1930).

Jurado lived her first years and studied at a school run by nuns in the Guadalupe Inn neighborhood of Mexico City. She later studied to be a bilingual secretary. She wanted to study law and become a lawyer.

Her singular beauty drew attention since she was a teenager, and she was invited to work as an actress by producers and filmmakers, among them Emilio Fernández (one of the most prominent Mexican filmmakers at that time), who offered her a role in his first movie The Isle of Passion (1941). Although her godfather was Mexican actor Pedro Armendáriz, her parents never gave their consent.

Another filmmaker interested in her was Mauricio de la Serna, who offered her a role in the film No matarás (1943). She signed the contract without authorization from her parents, and when they found out, they threatened to send her to a boarding school in Monterrey. Around this time, she met aspiring actor Víctor Velázquez and married him soon afterward. Her marriage was largely motivated by the desire to continue a career as an actress and to escape the yoke of her parents. Velázquez was the father of her children, Victor Hugo and Sandra. The marriage ended in 1943, shortly after Jurado began her film career.

=== 1943–1951: First Mexican films ===
Jurado debuted as an actress in the Mexican film No matarás (1943). From that moment on, her acting talent, but above all her exotic beauty and sensual appeal, gave her the opportunity to work in numerous films. She specialized in playing wicked and seductive women. Jurado said:

I knew that my body was provocative, but also that I was not beautiful, although yes, I admit, my physique was different and very sensual.

She appeared in 16 more films over the next seven years in what film historians have named the Golden Age of Mexican cinema. She acted with acclaimed Mexican film stars such as Pedro Infante, Sara Montiel, Pedro Armendáriz, and others. In 1953, she starred in Luis Buñuel's film El Bruto, for which she received an Ariel Award for Best Supporting Actress, Mexico's equivalent of an Academy Award.

=== 1951–1968: Success in Hollywood ===
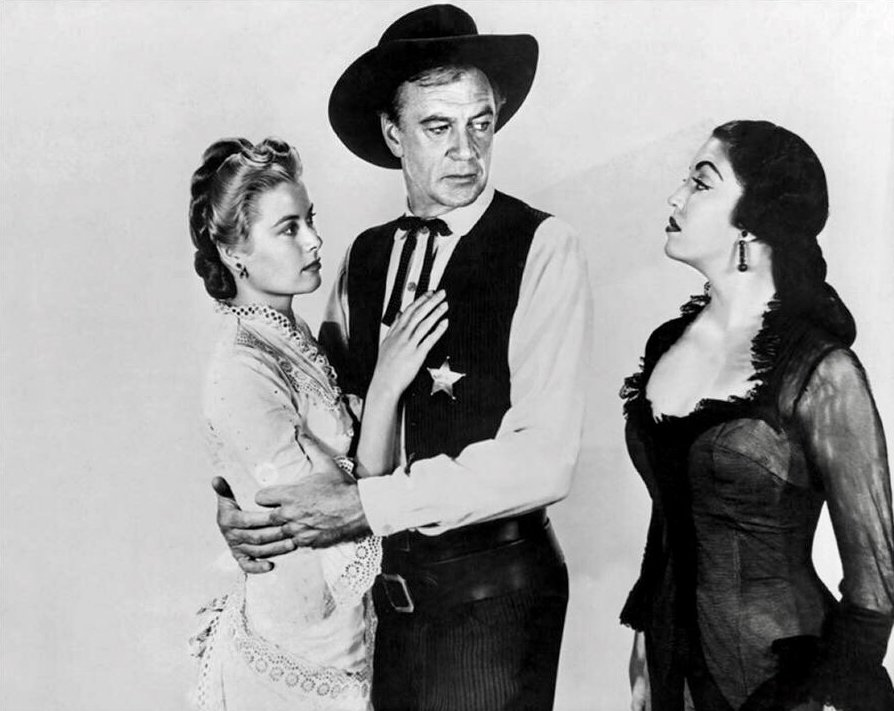
Grace Kelly (white dress), Gary Cooper, and Jurado (black dress) in a publicity photograph for the film High Noon (1952)

In addition to acting, Jurado worked as a movie columnist, radio reporter, and bullfight critic to support her family. She was on assignment when filmmaker Budd Boetticher and actor John Wayne spotted her at a bullfight. Neither knew she was an actress. However, Boetticher, who was also a professional bullfighter, cast Jurado in his 1951 film Bullfighter and the Lady, opposite Gilbert Roland, as the wife of an aging matador. She was not interested in working in American films, but accepted because the film would be shot in Mexico. She had rudimentary English language skills and memorized and delivered her lines phonetically. Despite this limitation, her strong performance brought her to the attention of Hollywood producer Stanley Kramer, who cast her in the classic Western High Noon (1952), starring Gary Cooper and Grace Kelly. Jurado learned to speak English for the role, studying and taking classes two hours per day for two months. She played saloon owner Helen Ramírez, former love of reluctant hero Cooper's Will Kane. She earned a Golden Globe Award for Best Supporting Actress and gained notice in the American movie industry.

Jurado with Charlton Heston in Arrowhead (1953)

From the success of the film, Jurado began working on numerous American films, most of them in the Western genre. In 1953, she had a role in San Antone, directed by Joseph Kane and opposite Rod Cameron. In the same year, she had a role in Arrowhead with Charlton Heston and Jack Palance, playing an evil Comanche woman, the love interest of Heston's character.

In 1954, actress Dolores del Río was accused of being a communist sympathizer at the height of the McCarthy era, and the U.S. government refused permission for her to work in the film Broken Lance, directed by Edward Dmytryk and where she was going to interpret Spencer Tracy's Comanche wife. Jurado was selected for the role despite the resistance of the studio because of her youth. After viewing footage of her scenes, studio executives were impressed. Her performance garnered an Academy Award nomination. Jurado was the first Latin American actress to compete for the Oscar.

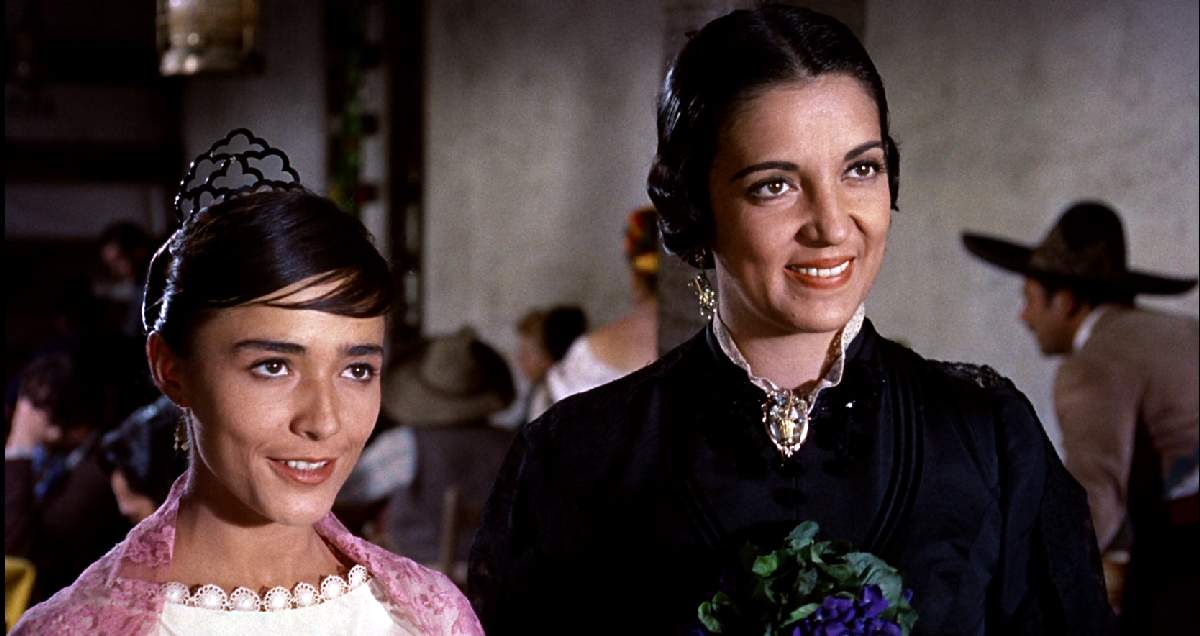

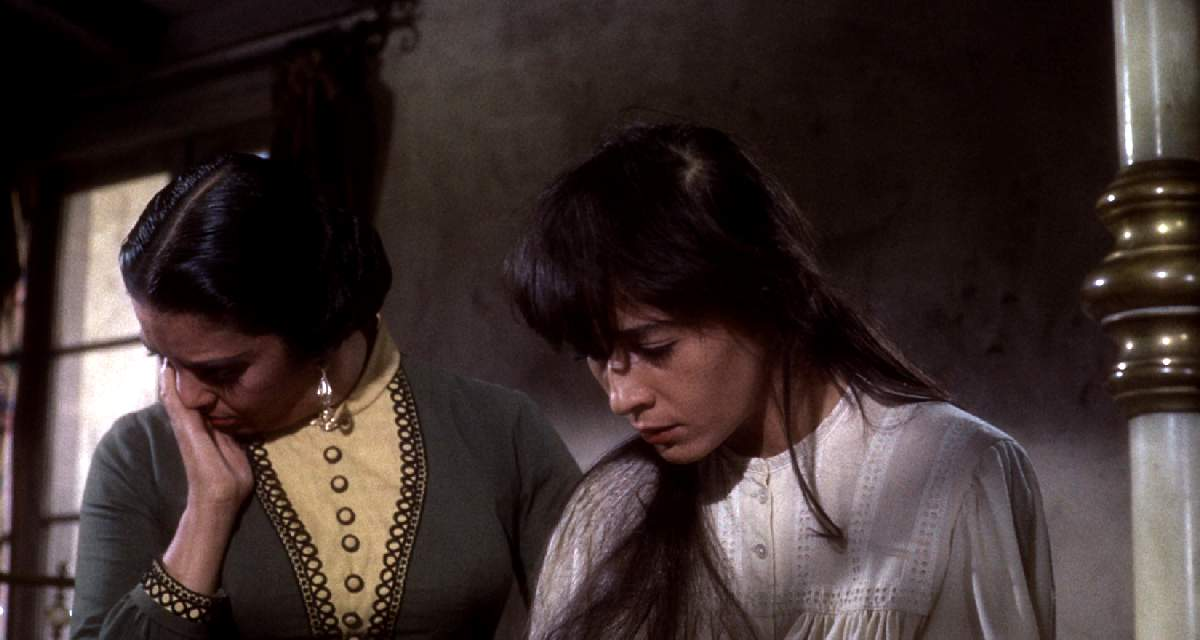
Scenes of Jurado with Pina Pellicer in One-Eyed Jacks (1961)

In the same year, Jurado appeared with Kirk Douglas in the Henry Hathaway film The Racers. In 1955, Jurado filmed Trial, directed by Mark Robson, with Glenn Ford. It was a drama about a Mexican boy accused of raping a white girl, with Jurado playing the mother of the accused. For this role, she was nominated for the Golden Globe Award for Best Supporting Actress. In the same year, she traveled to Italy for the filming of Trapeze, directed by Carol Reed, with Burt Lancaster and Tony Curtis. On set, Jurado had severe friction with the film's other female star, actress Gina Lollobrigida.

Despite the fact that she always stated that acting in the theater did not please her, in 1956, Jurado debuted on Broadway in the play The Best House in Naples (1956), by Eduardo de Filippo.

In 1956, she participated in the film Man from Del Rio (1956), opposite Anthony Quinn, one of the few Hollywood movies to have Mexican actors as main stars. Later, she acted in Westerns Dragoon Wells Massacre (1957) with Barry Sullivan and The Badlanders (1958), with Alan Ladd and Ernest Borgnine. In 1957, she debuted on television with a guest appearance in an episode of Playhouse 90. In 1959, she acted for the first time under Sam Peckinpah's direction in an episode of The Rifleman. In 1962, she appeared as the historical character La Tules in an episode of Death Valley Days.

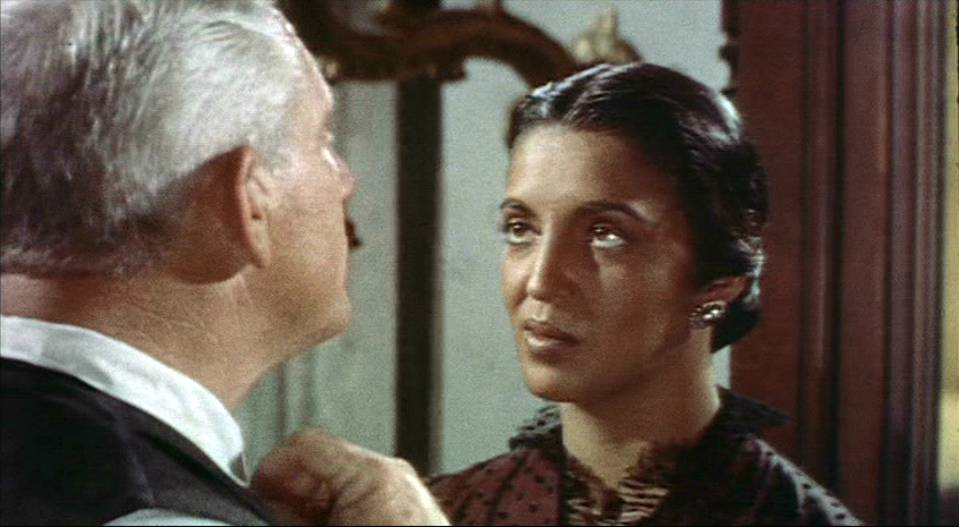
Spencer Tracy and Katy Jurado in Broken Lance (1954)

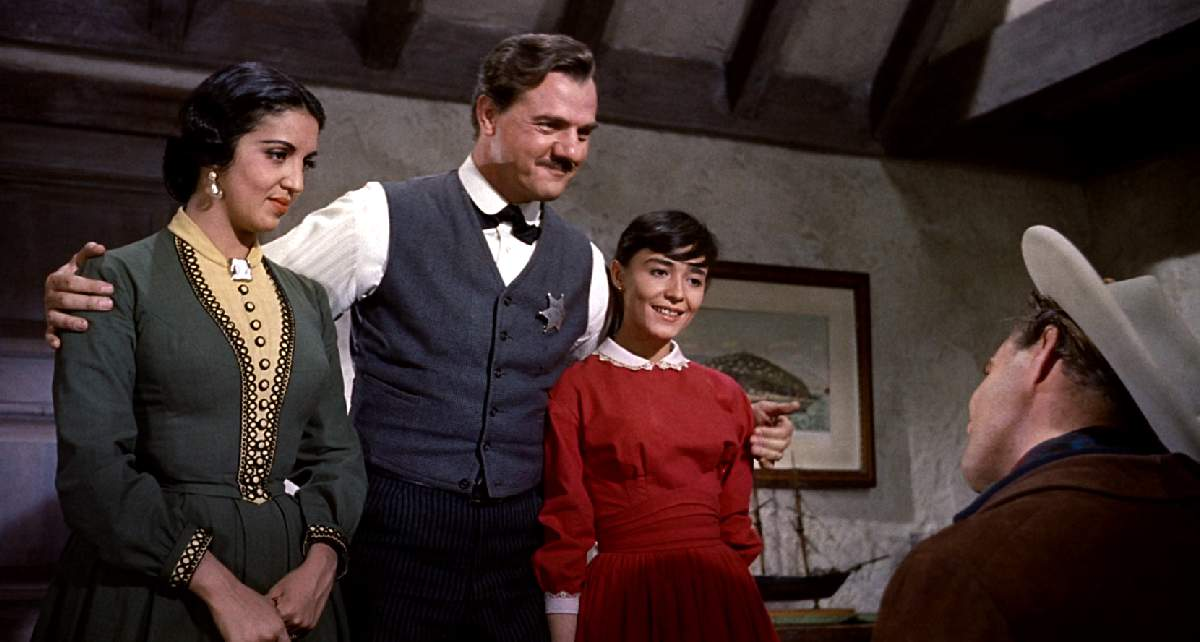
Jurado (left) and Pina Pellicer being hugged by Karl Malden while they stare at Marlon Brando in One-Eyed Jacks (1961)

In 1959, Marlon Brando, with whom Jurado maintained a close friendship, invited her to participate in One-Eyed Jacks, his first film as director. After marrying Ernest Borgnine, they founded their own production company called Sanvio Corp. The couple traveled to Italy, where they partnered with producer Dino de Laurentiis in Barabbas (where both acted with Anthony Quinn) and I briganti Italiani, directed by Mario Camerini.

In 1961, Jurado returned to Mexico and filmed La Bandida (1962), where she shared credits with Pedro Armendáriz and temperamental Mexican actress María Félix, with whom Jurado had friction on the set. Her stormy marriage with Borgnine ended in 1963. Depressed, Jurado returned to Mexico and established her residence in the city of Cuernavaca; she decided to alternate her work, though, with films between Mexico and the United States.

In 1965, Jurado returned to Hollywood for the film Smoky, directed by George Sherman, starring Fess Parker. In 1966, she played the mother of George Maharis's character in A Covenant with Death. In 1968, she appeared in the film Stay Away, Joe in the role of the half-Apache stepmother of Elvis Presley's character.

=== 1970–2002: Later years ===
In the next years, Jurado alternated her work between Hollywood and Mexico. In 1970, she filmed The Bridge in the Jungle opposite John Huston. In 1973, she appeared in Pat Garrett and Billy the Kid, directed by Sam Peckinpah.

Jurado received one of her better dramatic roles in the last of the three short stories comprising the Mexican film Fé, Esperanza y Caridad (1973). Directed by Jorge Fons, Jurado was cast as a lower-class woman, who suffers a series of bureaucratic abuses as she tries to claim the remains of her dead husband. For this performance, she won the Ariel Award for Best Actress, her second Silver Ariel Award of the Mexican Cinema. In the same year, Jurado starred on Broadway again in the Tennessee Williams play The Red Devil Battery Sign with Anthony Quinn and Claire Bloom.

In 1974, Jurado appeared in the American film Once Upon a Scoundrel (1974) opposite comedian Zero Mostel. In 1975, she participated in the Mexican film Los albañiles, again directed by Jorge Fons. The film was awarded the Golden Bear of the Berlinale 1975. In 1976, she played the role of Chuchupe in the film Pantaleón y Las Visitadoras, an adaptation of the novel Captain Pantoja and the Special Service by Mario Vargas Llosa, who also directed the film. However, the filming of this movie turned into a disaster due to the differences between Jurado and Vargas Llosa. Vargas Llosa fired Jurado from the film, and she sued him legally.

In 1978, she played a small role in the film The Children of Sanchez, where she shares credits with Anthony Quinn and Dolores del Río. In 1980, Jurado filmed La Seducción, directed by Arturo Ripstein, for which she was nominated for another Ariel Award for Best Actress.

In 1981, her son Victor Hugo died in an accident on a highway near Monterrey while she was filming a movie Barrio de campeones in Mexico City. This tragedy plunged her into a deep depression that she could never overcome and led her to abandon her acting career for a few years. In 1984, John Huston convinced her to resume her career as an actress. She acted in Huston's film Under the Volcano. In the same year, she co-starred in the short-lived television series a.k.a. Pablo, a sitcom with Paul Rodriguez.

In the 1990s, Jurado appeared in two Mexican telenovelas. In 1998, she completed a Spanish-language film for director Arturo Ripstein titled El Evangelio de las Maravillas. She won her second Ariel Award for Best Supporting Actress for this role.

Jurado had a cameo in the film The Hi-Lo Country (1998) by Stephen Frears, who called her his "lucky charm" for his first Western.

In 2002, she made her final film appearance in Un secreto de Esperanza. The film was released posthumously.

Jurado appeared in a musical revue presented at the Teatro Tívoli (Mexico City) in Mexico City.

== Personal life ==
=== Marriages ===
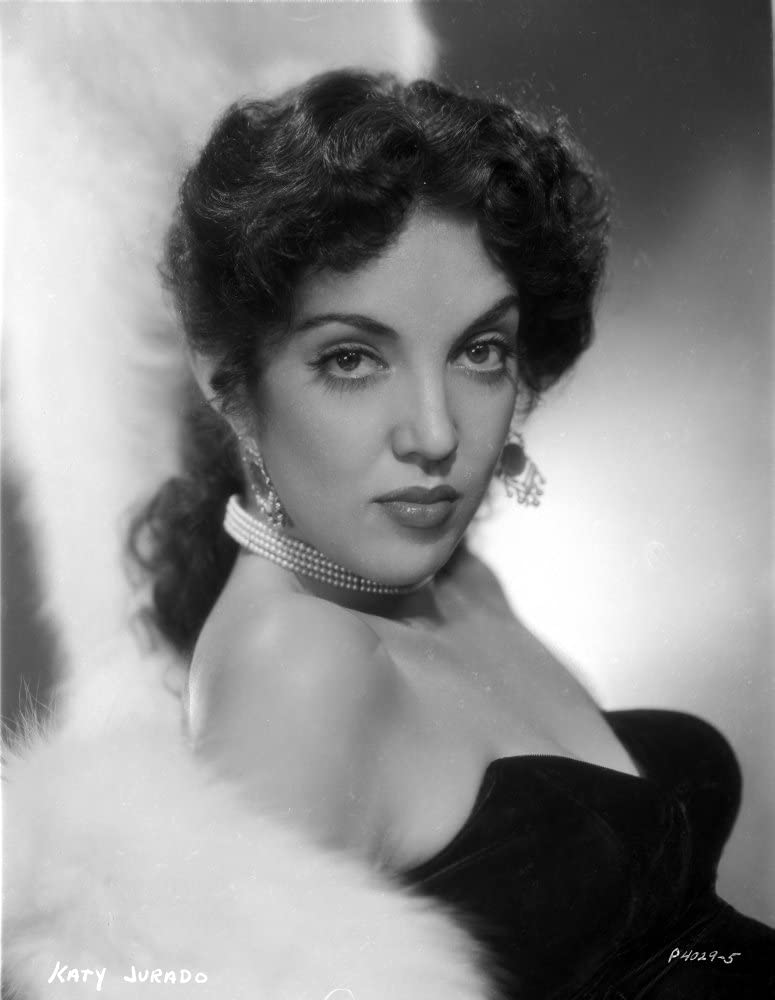
Katy Jurado in 1953

Katy Jurado was married twice. Her first husband was Mexican actor Víctor Velázquez (who was the stepfather of the popular Mexican actresses Tere and Lorena Velázquez). Her marriage was largely motivated by the desire to continue a career as an actress and to escape the yoke of her parents. Velázquez was the father of her children, a boy and a girl. The marriage ended in 1943, shortly after Jurado began her film career.

Her second husband was American actor Ernest Borgnine. Jurado and Borgnine met when he was filming Vera Cruz (1954) in Mexico. Jurado affirms that from that moment, Borgnine did not stop pursuing her. They were married on 31 December 1959. Jurado declared that her five years of courtship with Borgnine were the happiest of her life, but their relationship became complicated after they were married due to his uncontrollable jealousy. The temperament of both led to numerous violent confrontations, some of which were documented by the newspapers of the time. Jurado claimed to have suffered physical violence from Borgnine during their marriage.

Jurado and Borgnine divorced in 1963. After their divorce, Jurado fell into a severe depression that led her to consider suicide, so she decided to leave Hollywood and settle for the rest of her life in the city of Cuernavaca, in Mexico.

=== Other relationships ===
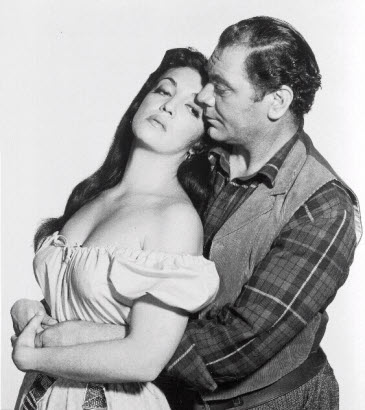
Jurado with Ernest Borgnine in The Badlanders (1958)

Early in her career in Hollywood, Jurado had affairs with film maker Budd Boetticher and actor Tyrone Power, but her most famous relationship was with Marlon Brando. Brando was smitten with Jurado after seeing her in High Noon. They met when Brando was in Mexico filming Viva Zapata! (1952). He was involved at the time with Movita Castaneda and was having a parallel relationship with Rita Moreno. Brando told Joseph L. Mankiewicz that he was attracted to "her enigmatic eyes, black as hell, pointing at you like fiery arrows". Jurado commented:

Marlon called me one night for a date, and I accepted. I knew all about Movita. I knew he had a thing for Rita Moreno. Hell, it was just a date. I didn't plan to marry him.

However, their first date became the beginning of an extended affair that lasted intermittently many years. In her maturity, Jurado affirmed that they maintained a "loving friendship", and that both even performed an Indian ritual in which they collected blood from their wrists.

Jurado also had a romantic relationship with Western novelist Louis L'Amour. She said: "I have love letters that he wrote me until the last day of his life. But we never match. Now I think I should have married that man." Jurado claimed to have been one of the people to find the body of Mexican actress Miroslava Stern after her suicide in 1955. According to Jurado, the picture that Stern had between her hands was of Mexican comedian Cantinflas, but artistic manager Fanny Schatz exchanged the photo for one of Spanish bullfighter Luis Miguel Dominguín.

=== Family ===
In 1981, her son died in an accident on a highway near Monterrey. Jurado was filming a movie when she found out about the accident and professionally wrapped up the shoot after burying her son. This tragedy plunged her into a deep depression that she could never overcome and led her to abandon her acting career for a few years and also to take refuge in alcohol. She later said:

When my son died, I was filming a movie in Mexico. He took with him half of my life. I could not mourn him as I wanted. I went to the funeral and I had to return to film the movie. Every day when I saw the camera, I hated her. I dedicated to the films a wonderful time I should have given to my children, but it was too late.

Jurado claimed that film maker John Huston was who rescued her from depression and convinced her to resume her career in the movie Under the Volcano. Jurado also claimed that during the filming of the film, Huston confessed to having been in love with her.

== Death ==
Toward the end of her life, Jurado suffered from heart and lung ailments. She died of kidney failure and pulmonary disease on 5 July 2002 at the age of 78 at her home in Cuernavaca, Mexico. She was buried in Cuernavaca at the Panteón de la Paz cemetery.

== Legacy ==
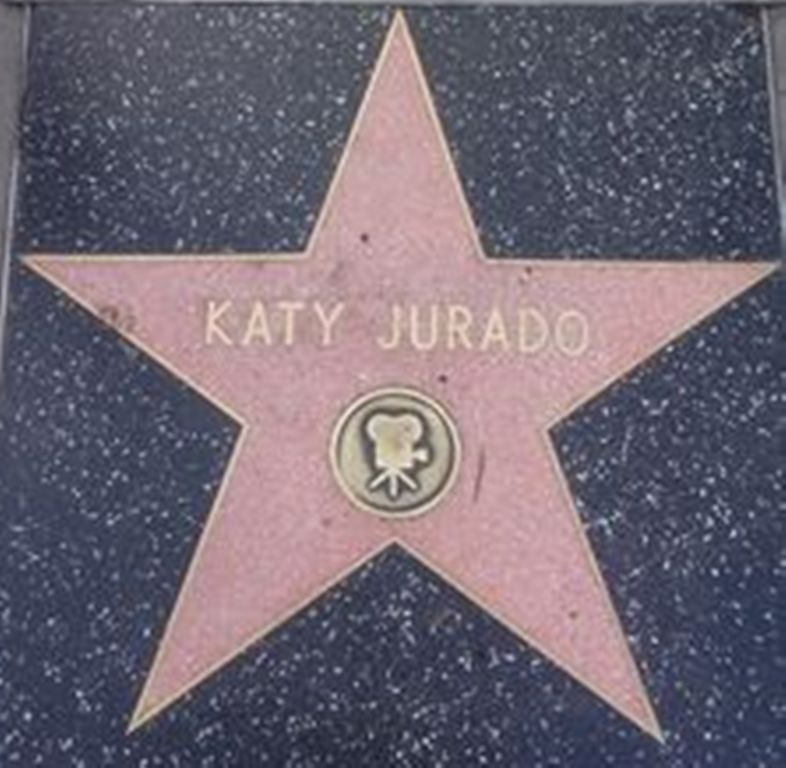
Jurado's star on the Hollywood Walk of Fame

Jurado has a star on the Hollywood Walk of Fame at 7065 Hollywood Boulevard for her contributions to motion pictures.

In 1953, Jurado was captured in a portrait by Mexican artist Diego Rivera.

In 1992, she was honored with the Golden Boot Award for her notable contribution to the Western genre.

In 1998, Mexican singer-songwriter Juan Gabriel composed a song for her titled, "Que rechula es Katy (What a beauty is Katy)".

She was honored with a Google Doodle on 16 January 2018.
