= Sinful (film) =

- Directed by: Rafael Baledón
- Written by: José María Fernández Unsáin
- Produced by: Jesús Sotomayor Martínez
- Starring: Arturo de Córdova; Marga López; Joaquín Cordero; Pina Pellicer; Kitty de Hoyos; Marco Antonio Muñiz; Julissa; Tito Junco; Javier Solís
- Cinematography: Raúl Martínez Solares
- Edited by: Carlos Savage
- Music by: Sergio Guerrero
- Release date: 1 April 1965
- Running time: 95 minutes
- Country: Mexico
- Language: Spanish

Sinful (Spanish: El pecador) is a 1965 Mexican drama and crime film, written by José María Fernández Unsáin, directed by Rafael Baledón, and starring Arturo de Córdova, Marga López, Joaquín Cordero, Pina Pellicer, Kitty de Hoyos, Marco Antonio Muñiz, Julissa, Tito Junco and Javier Solís. It was the last film in which Pina Pellicer acted and was released after her death the previous year.

== Plot ==
Mario, a law professor at the UNAM, known for his impeccable ethics, professionalism, widower and father of Irma, rejects the constant flirtations that his young student Lidia proposes to him. At a surprise party that his daughter throws for his birthday, he ends up getting drunk and goes straight to a cabaret where he falls in love with a prostitute named Olga, who is in a “toxic relationship” with her pimp and also drug trafficker, César Domínguez. On the other hand, her friend Sonia, also a prostitute, lies to a man named Víctor telling him that she is a nurse so that he does not leave her. Both women develop a love story with their respective lover, while trying to get out of prostitution and crime.

== Cast ==
- Arturo de Córdova as Mario
- Marga López as Olga
- Joaquín Cordero as César Domínguez
- Pina Pellicer as Irma
- Javier Solís as Víctor
- Ramón Valdés as Juan / mesero
- Kitty de Hoyos as Sonia
- Julissa as Lidia
- Marco Antonio Muñiz as Bruno
- Maura Monti as César's blonde lover (uncredited)
