= Charles Lang =

American cinematographer (1902–1998)

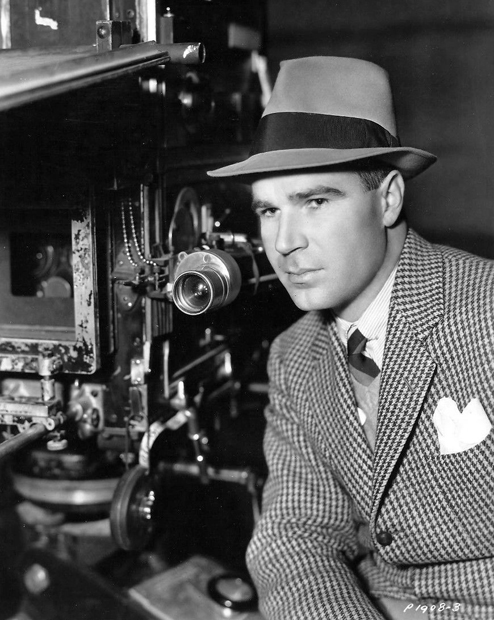
- Lang in 1936
- Born: Charles Bryant Lang Jr. March 27, 1902; Bluff, Utah, U.S.
- Died: April 3, 1998 (aged 96); Santa Monica, California, U.S.
- Occupation: Cinematographer
- Years active: 1926–1973

Charles Bryant Lang Jr., A.S.C. (March 27, 1902 – April 3, 1998), was an American cinematographer, active from the silent era through the early 1970s. He won an Academy Award for Best Cinematography for his work on A Farewell to Arms (1932), with an additional 17 nominations between 1931 and 1973.

== Early life and career ==
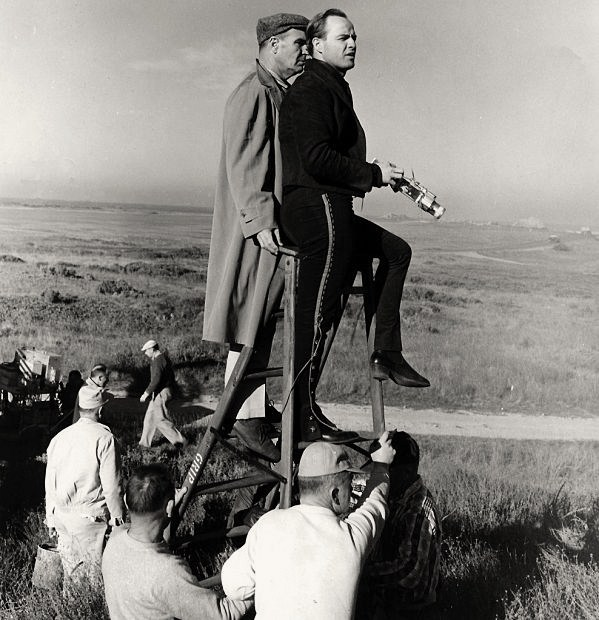
Lang and Marlon Brando in 1961, filming One-Eyed Jacks

Lang was born in Bluff, Utah, in 1902. His father, Charles B. Lang Sr., was a photographer and explorer of cliff ruins in Utah and the southwestern United States.

Early in his career, he worked with the Akeley camera, a gyroscope-mounted "pancake" camera designed by Carl Akeley for outdoor action shots. Lang's first credits were as co-cinematographer on the silent films The Night Patrol (1926) and The Loves of Ricardo (1927).

After completing Tom Sawyer for Paramount Pictures in 1930, he continued working at the studio for more than twenty years. The style of lighting he introduced in A Farewell to Arms became heavily identified with all of Paramount's films during the 1930s and 1940s, though he occasionally worked for other studios, for instance on The Ghost and Mrs. Muir (1947).

In 1951, he began the second phase of his career, this time as a free-lance cinematographer. His credits include The Big Heat (1953) with Glenn Ford and Lee Marvin, Sabrina (1954) with Humphrey Bogart, Audrey Hepburn, and William Holden, Gunfight at the O.K. Corral (1957) with Burt Lancaster and Kirk Douglas, The Matchmaker (1958), Some Like It Hot (1959) with Marilyn Monroe and Jack Lemmon, The Magnificent Seven (1960) with Steve McQueen, One-Eyed Jacks (1961) with Marlon Brando, How the West Was Won (1962) in Cinerama, Charade (1963) with Cary Grant and Audrey Hepburn, Bob & Carol & Ted & Alice (1969), and Butterflies Are Free (1972).

Lang received a Lifetime Achievement Award from the American Society of Cinematographers in 1991, for a career which included at least 114 feature films.

== Personal life ==
Lang married Hylah Lang in 1925, and stayed married until her death in 1982. They had one child: Judy Lang, who became an actress. Judy's daughter, Katherine Kelly Lang is also an actress, best known for her role as Brooke Logan Forrester on the CBS soap opera The Bold and the Beautiful.

== Death ==
On April 3, 1998, Lang died at the age of 96, after suffering from pneumonia.

== Academy Awards ==
Lang won an Oscar the second time he was nominated, early in his career; he received a total of 18 nominations, tying with Leon Shamroy for the most Academy Award for Best Cinematography nominations.

=== Wins ===
- A Farewell to Arms (1932)

=== Nominations ===
Lang also received Oscar nominations for the following films:

- The Right to Love (1930)
- Arise, My Love (1940)
- Sundown (1941)
- So Proudly We Hail! (1943)
- The Uninvited (1944)
- The Ghost and Mrs. Muir (1947)
- A Foreign Affair (1948)
- Sudden Fear (1952)
- Sabrina (1954)
- Queen Bee (1955)
- Separate Tables (1958)
- Some Like It Hot (1959)
- The Facts of Life (1960)
- One-Eyed Jacks (1961)
- How the West Was Won (1962)
- Bob & Carol & Ted & Alice (1969)
- Butterflies Are Free (1972)
