= Traditional metal working in Mexico =

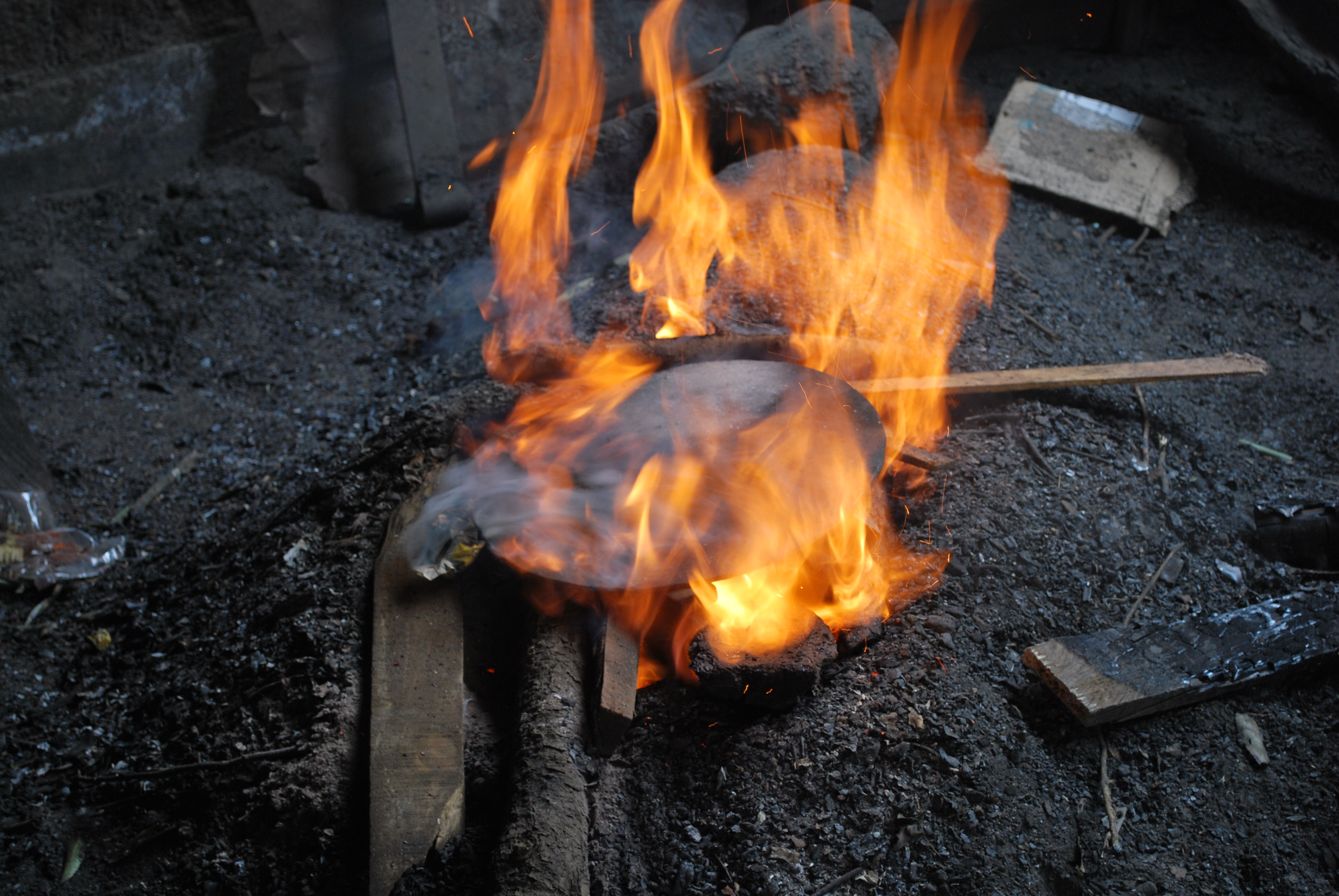
Heating copper plate in Abdón Punzo's workshop in Santa Clara del Cobre, Michoacán

Traditional metal working in Mexico dates from the Mesoamerican period with metals such as gold, silver and copper. Other metals were mined and worked starting in the colonial period. The working of gold and silver, especially for jewelry, initially declined after the Spanish conquest of the Aztec Empire. However, during the colonial period, the working of metals rose again and took on much of the character traditional goods still have. Today, important metal products include those from silver, gold, copper, iron, tin and more made into jewelry, household objects, furniture, pots, decorative objects, toys and more. Important metal working centers include Taxco for silver, Santa Clara del Cobre for copper, Celaya for tin and Zacatecas for wrought iron.

== History ==
=== Prehispanic period ===
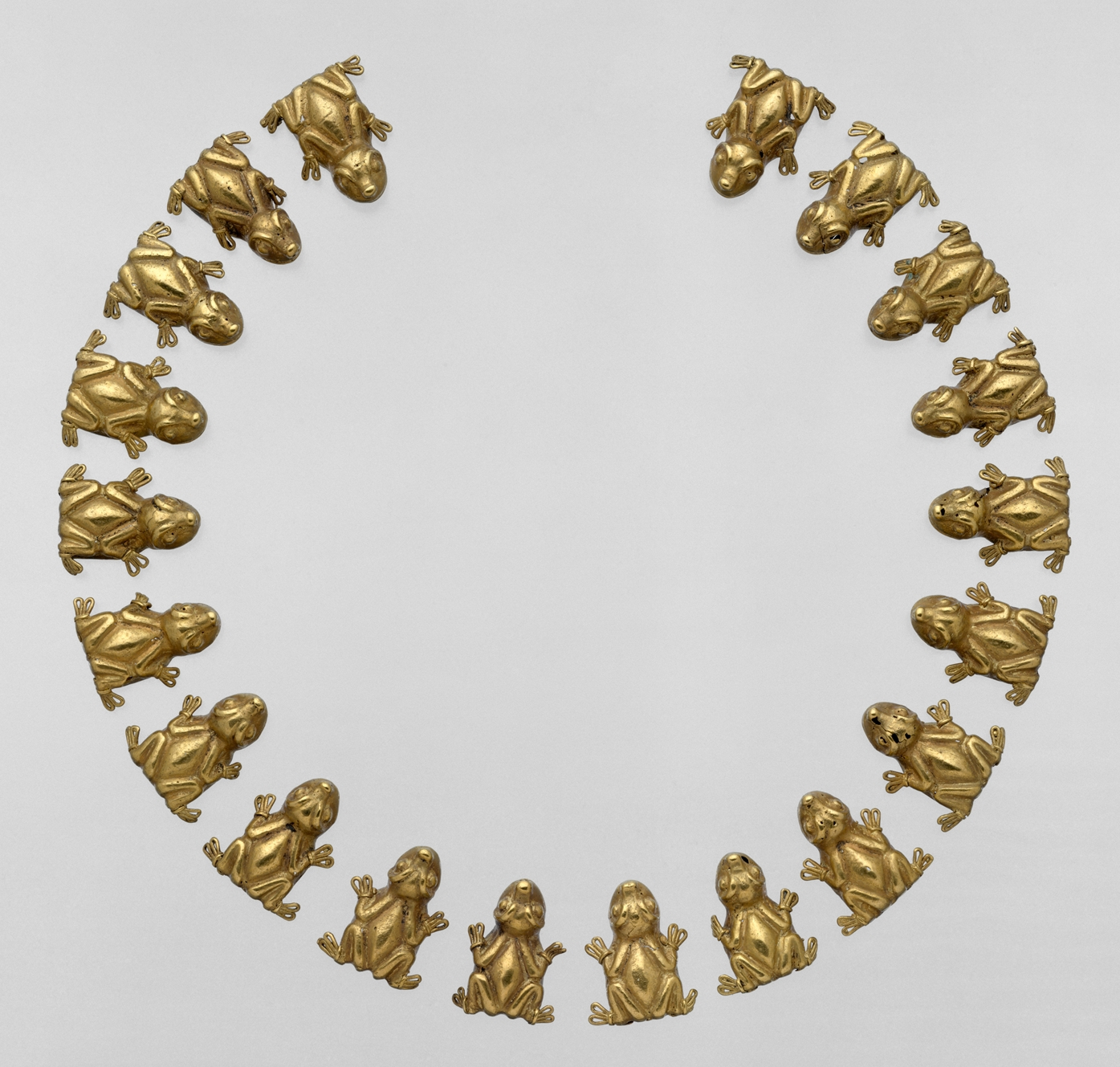
Aztec or Mixtec frog ornament necklace from the Metropolitan Museum of Art, 15-16th cent. Frogs are associated with the earth.

Metal working in Mesoamerica, especially of silver, gold and copper was advanced by the time the Spanish arrived, mostly concentrated in the modern states of Michoacán, Oaxaca and Guerrero. The mining and working of metals probably came to Mesoamerican cultures from the south. Metal working was principally in gold, silver, tin and lead, with some copper work known in what is now Michoacán. Gold was generally obtained in powder or pellet form in rivers and streams from various sites in Guerrero, Oaxaca, Michoacán, the Central Highlands and the Mayan region. As silver rarely appeared on the surface it was almost exclusively mined.

In the pre Hispanic period, metals were used to create needles, punches, tweezers, weapons and musical instrument but its most important uses, especially gold and silver, was as jewelry for the social elite and as offerings to the gods. Gold and silver were worked by hammering, plating and molds the blending of these and some casting was known. One pre Hispanic technique was to hammer metal flat, punch out a design and then layer this design over wood or leather, often used on shields. Silver was less used in the pre Hispanic period as it was less valued as tribute. It did not have the same divine symbolic value that gold did. The use of copper was almost exclusive to the Purépecha Empire in what is now Michoacán when the Spanish arrived. Copper instruments included axes, hoes, scythes, punches, chisels, needles, pins, arrowheads, brooches, canes, handles, helmets, shields and small bells.

=== Colonial period ===
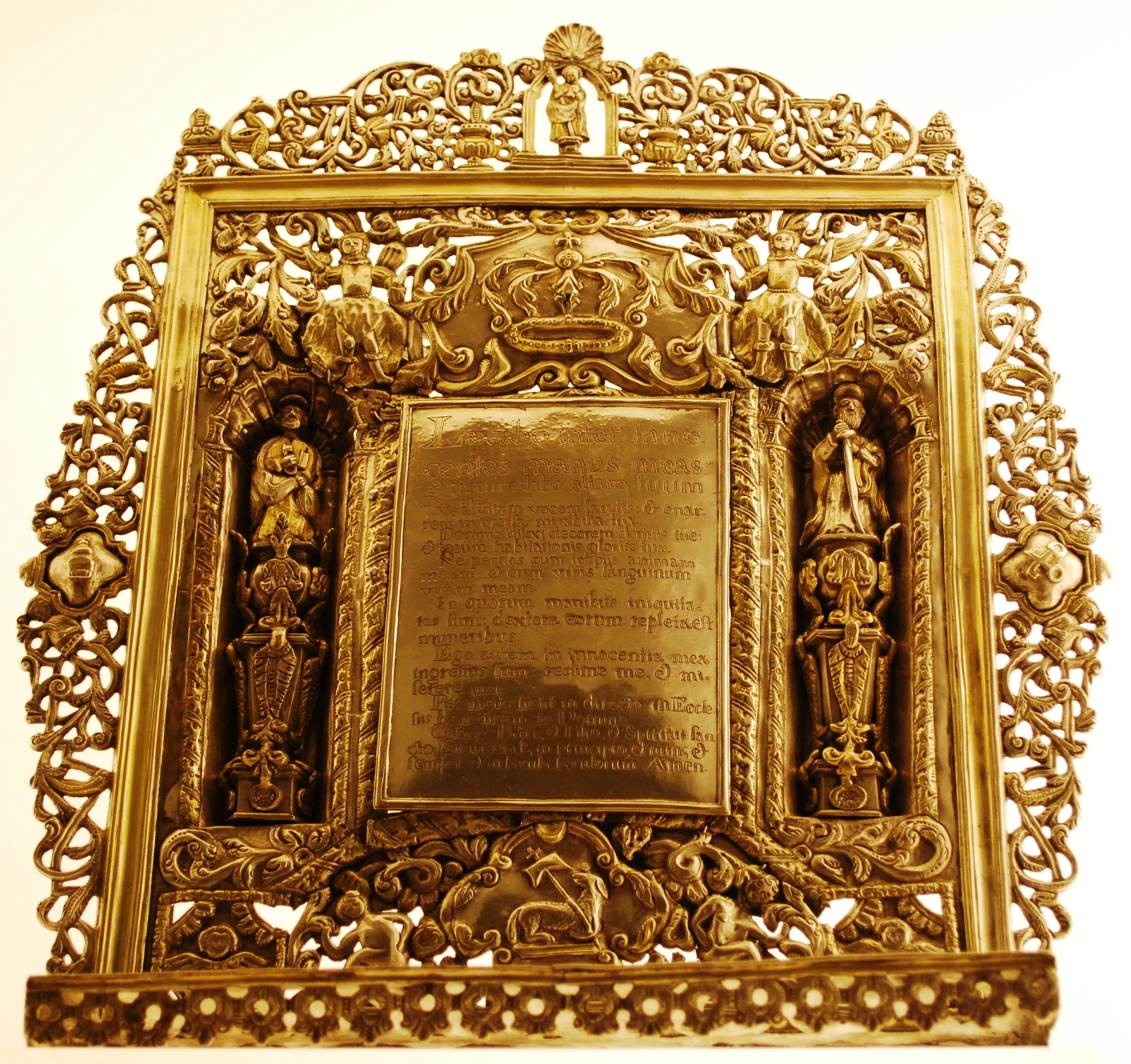
Colonial period gold/Silver book holder at the Franz Mayer Museum in Mexico City

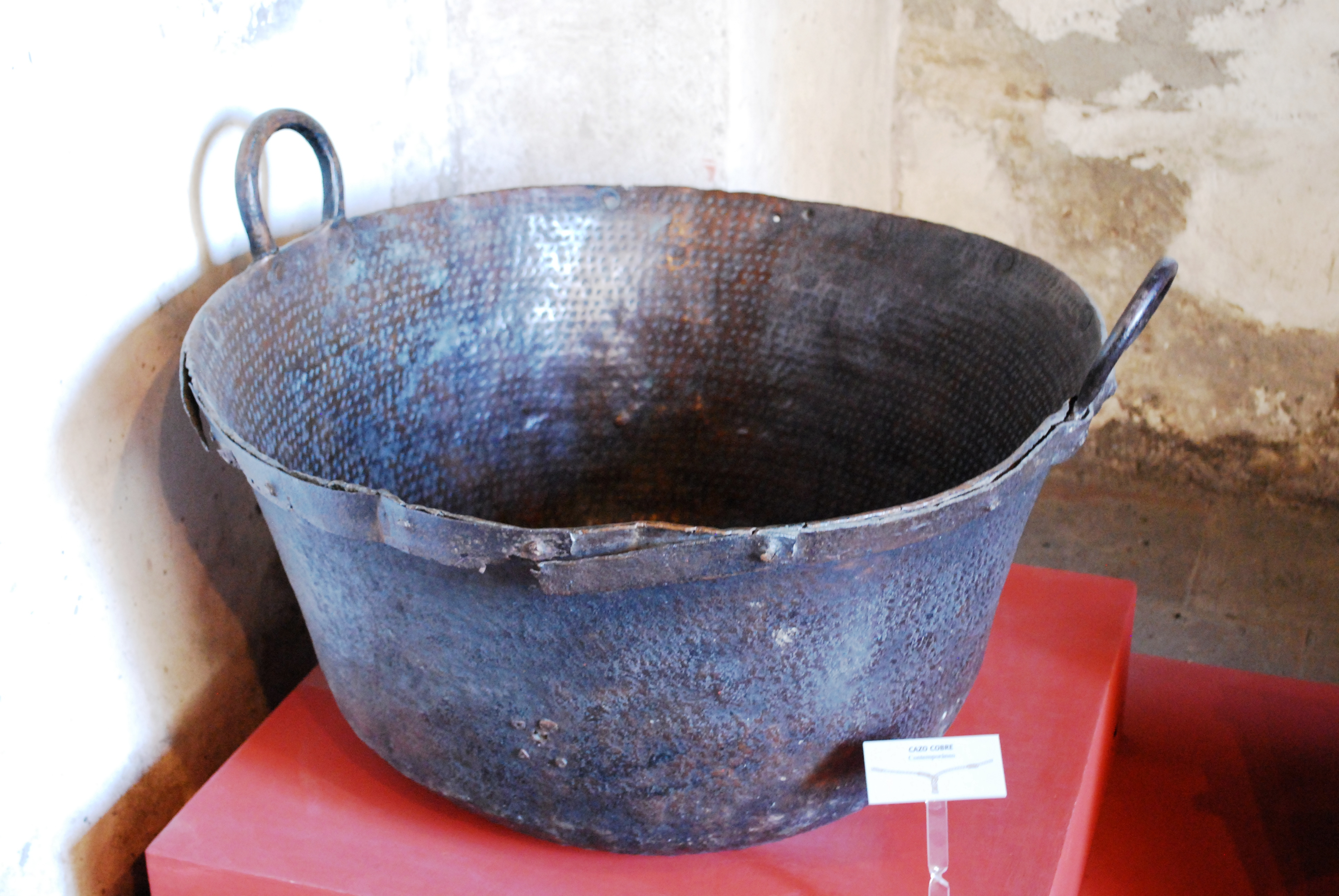
Copper cooking pot on display at the kitchen area of the old monastery of Zinacantepec, State of Mexico

According to tradition, one of the first gifts that Hernán Cortés received from Moctezuma II was a pair of discs, one in gold and one in silver, which represented the sun and moon respectively. The existence of gold and silver in Mexico was one of the main attractions for the Spanish in the New World, with the conquest of the Aztec Empire and subsequent exploration with the aim of finding more of these precious metals. Mining and metal working became a main aspect of the economy of colonial Mexico. Most of the emphasis was on the mining of gold, silver, copper, iron, lead, platinum and tin with much of the metal, especially gold, shipped to Spain.

Initially, the working of metals in the new colony was heavily restricted or outright banned for several reasons, including protection of Spanish metal guilds, the fact that the work did not contribute to royal taxes and the fear that the indigenous would make weapons. However, these soon became impractical to enforce with the restrictions then only to the making of objects related to indigenous religion. The Spanish introduced new metalworking techniques, especially the promoting of copper work by Vasco de Quiroga in Michoacan and various metals by Pedro de Gante in Mexico City and eventually indigenous craftsmen competed with European ones. Most of Mexican colonial metal work copied that in Spain, which was Gothic in style and later Renaissance. These styles eventually defined the handcraft work of areas such as Oaxaca, Zacatecas, Durango, San Luis Potosí and Guanajuato. However, after the Conquest, the making of jewelry in Mexico nearly disappeared, with precious metals shipped to Spain. Only after 1551, with the establishment of a Mexican upper class, did this return slowly. At first Spanish craftsmen arrived to work European methods including filigree, repoussé and chasing, engraving and the incrustation of precious stones. But during the colonial period, these craftsmen never reached the level of their contemporaries in Europe. Indigenous craftsmen were relegated in this area to producing cheaper jewelry with lesser metals.

One exception to the relative lack of precious metal work was that in silver, which became more important over the colonial period after the start of trade with Asia in the 17th century. Mexico's abundance made silver an important form of currency and silver working guilds gained prestige and power, mostly in the creation of coins, silverware, religious medallions, crosses and liturgical items. Indigenous silver jewelry often became marked by the use of silver coins as decoration. Trade with the Orient introduced elements to silver pieces such as pearls (later augmented by those found in the Gulf of California), turtle shell and colored glass from Europe. The last was particularly popular with indigenous communities. One item that was important in the 18th century were cigarette and snuff cases made of both silver and gold, as the habit of using tobacco became very fashionable among the upper classes. The creation of the cases waned in the 19th as lower classes began to use tobacco as well.

=== Independence to the present ===
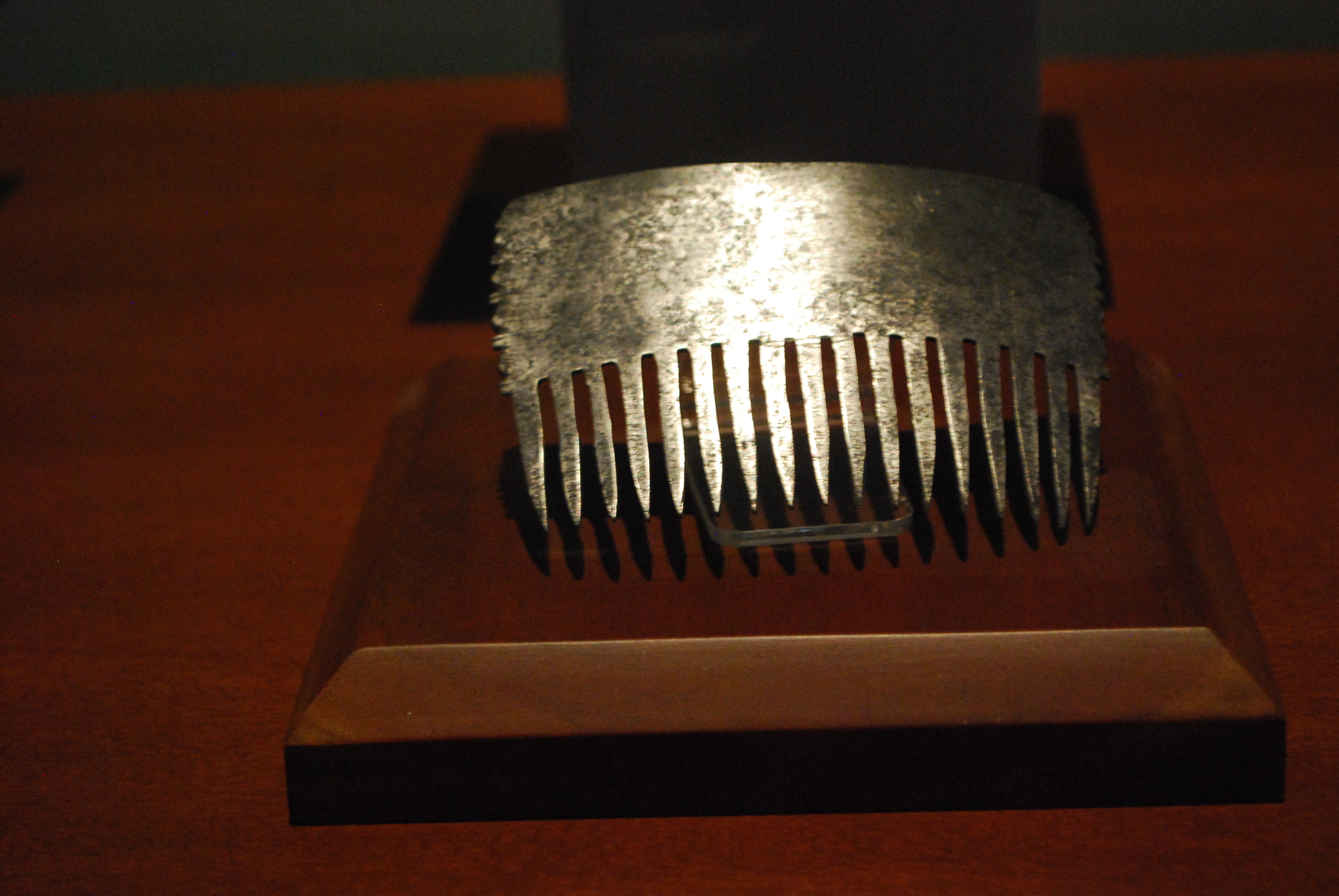
19th century silver comb on display at the Allende House Museum in San Miguel Allende, Guanajuato

After the Mexican War of Independence, much of Mexico metalworking continued to follow European trends, with elements added such as Mexican national symbols. Silverwork became less Baroque in nature and more secularized during the 19th century as political antagonism towards the Church grew and became more focused on items such as buttons, cane handles, pocket watches and hair decorations, incrustations as well as jewelry. The indigenous tended to keep more of the colonial era designs especially necklaces with dangling coins, glass and silver figurines, filigree.

As mines gave out in the 19th and 20th centuries, precious metalworking declined. Traditional utilitarian iron and copper working declined due to industrialization. In the mid 20th century, a revival began in silver working in the town of Taxco, even though the area's mines had given out. It began with the work of American artisan William Spratling, who took traditional Mexican indigenous and colonial designs and gave them new adaptations, then teaching other artisans in the area. Today, Taxco's silverwork is one of Mexico's important exports of finished products. Copper working, mostly for utilitarian items and home décor continues in Santa Clara del Cobre, a tradition that has remained since the early colonial period. These items include bowls, plates, pitchers, vases and their quality has won awards in both Mexico and abroad.

== Jewelry making ==
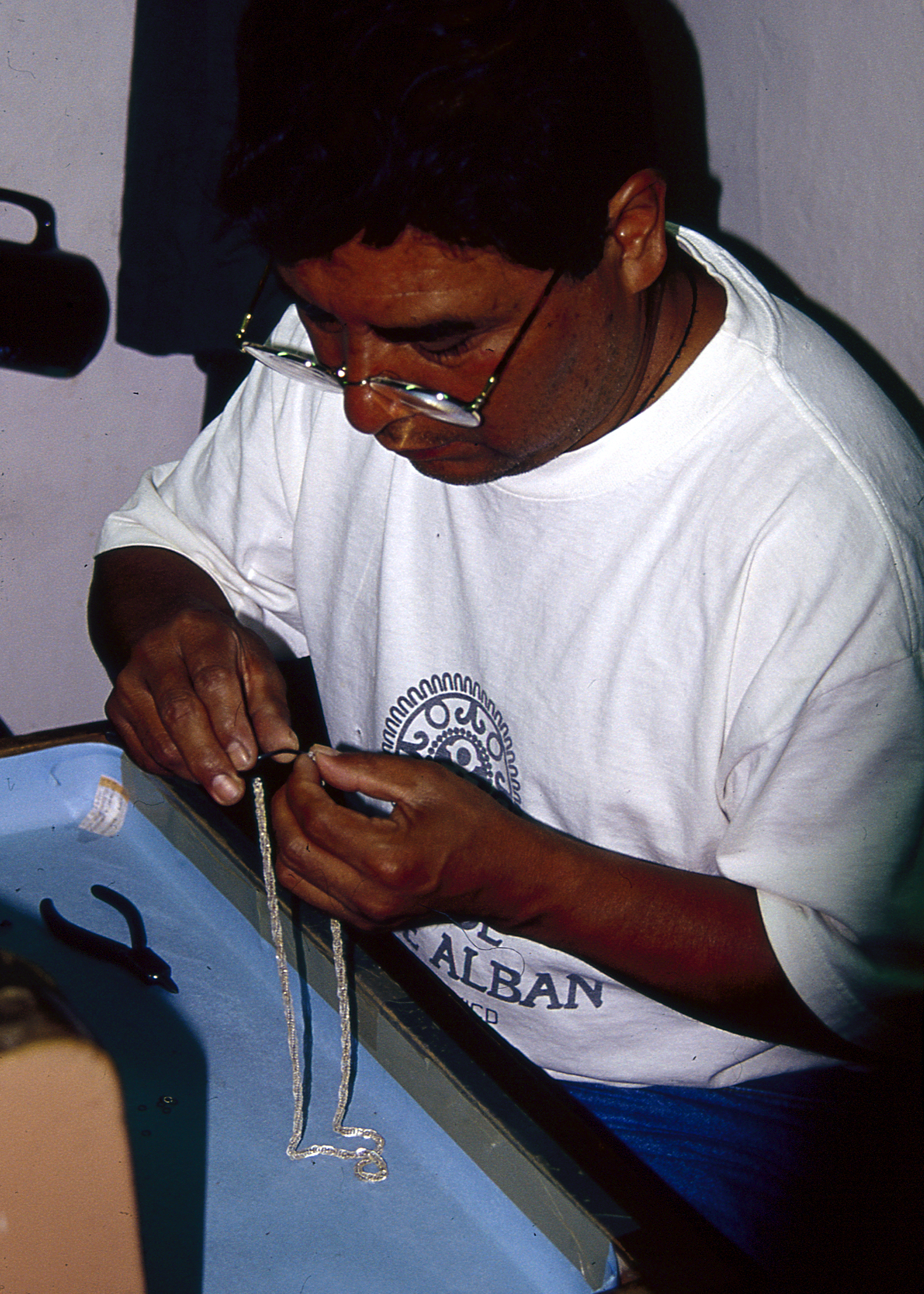
Artisan assembling silver necklace in Oaxaca

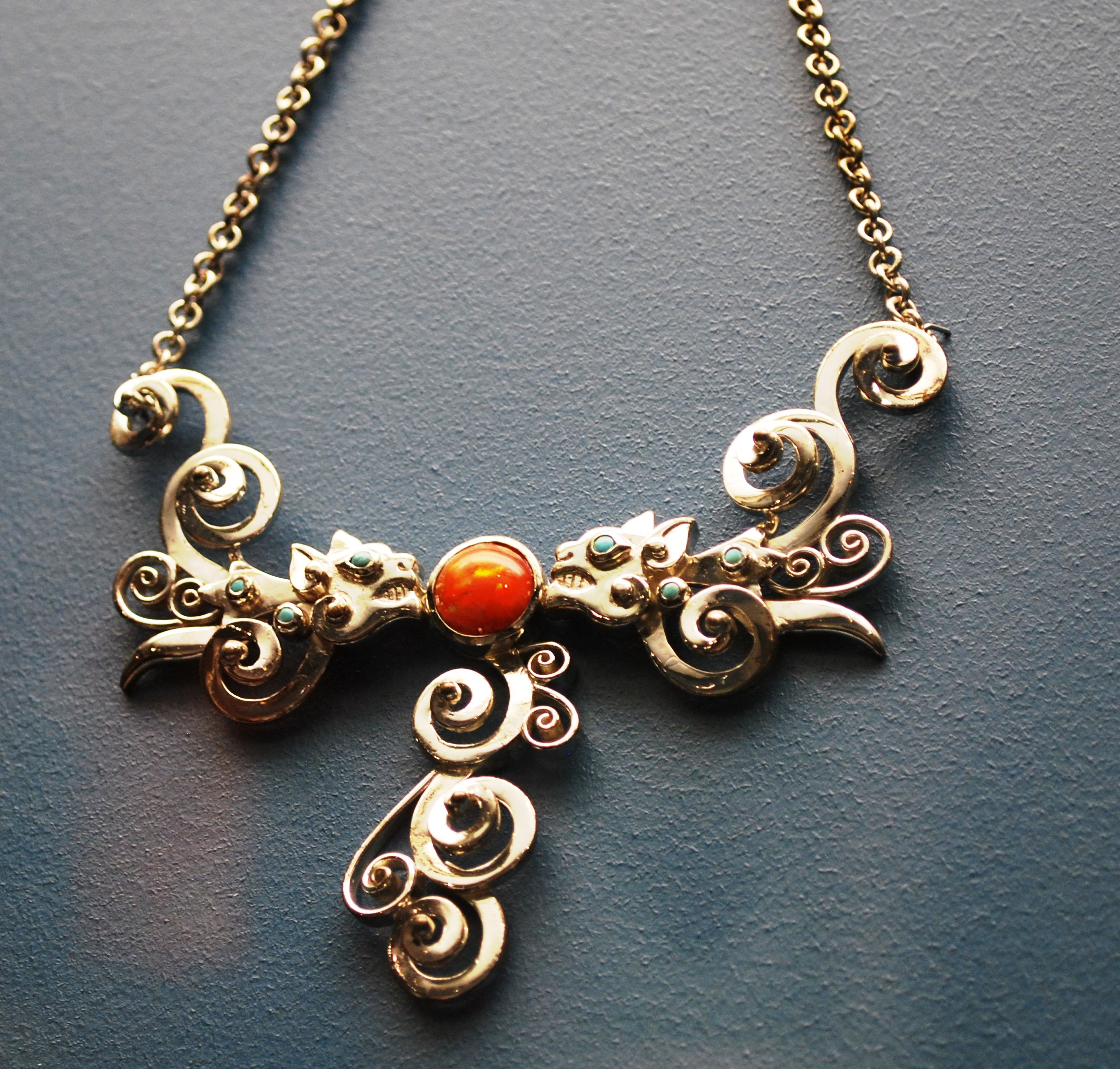
Silver necklace with ruby, emerald and Mexican opal with two jaguars in confrontation from Guadalajara on display at the Museum of Arte Popular in Mexico City

Jewelry making began well before the arrival of the Spanish, with mines providing supplies of metals and stones. The designs of modern Mexican handcrafted jewelry is a mixture of both Spanish and indigenous traditions. Indigenous designs are based on those seen in Mesoamerican codices and artifacts from archeological sites. Most of Mexico's fine jewelry is made in silver, with the most important center being Taxco, Guerrero. A lesser known center is San Felipe del Progreso in the State of Mexico. Here traditional Mazahua jewelry has seen a revival, especially the production of earrings used for Mazahua weddings, but also bracelets and necklaces. In Guanajuato, jewelry making focuses on cast silver in colonial style often decorated with images of birds along with glass beads and pearls. In Pátzcuaro, artisans made necklaces and earrings of smooth or scratched silver, often with small dangling fish, combined with red and black porcelain beads. In Yalalag, Oaxaca they make silver necklaces with colonial era style crosses. In Huetamo and Zitácuaro, they made dangling earrings called arracadas of silver with images of leaves, flowers and birds. In Huazolotitlán, Oaxaca, they make beaded necklaces with crosses and small animals made of silver.

While gold jewelry making faded during the colonial period in Mexico, it is still done in a number of places such as Iguala and Taxco in Guerrero. In Ometepec, large and small crosses are made with various metals along with gold necklaces of various colors. Gold filigree is an important trade in Chiapas, often made with local amber. Fine gold and silver wire is used by craftsmen in Oaxaca, Yucatán, Guerrero and Chiapas to create earrings, necklaces and bracelets with intricate designs. In the Tierra Caliente region of Michoacán, they make a type of dangling gold earring with the name of “siete lunas” or seven moons. In Yucatán rosaries made with gold or gold plated filigree are popular often made with red and pink coral. Turtle shell jewelry is incrusted with gold and silver. Soplillos are necklaces de cuentas de oro ochavadas in Yucatán. Fine jewelry making in Campeche tends to focus on the creation of earrings and rings with incrustations of gold and silver. Mayan influence can be seen in the large gold chains. In Quintana Roo, a type of dangling earring called an arracadas in gold are popular since the 20th century, which includes men of high social status in Mayan communities. The creation of gold and silver jewelry is very varied in Oaxaca mixed with various other materials including coral, coins, colored glass and various stones.

== Silver ==
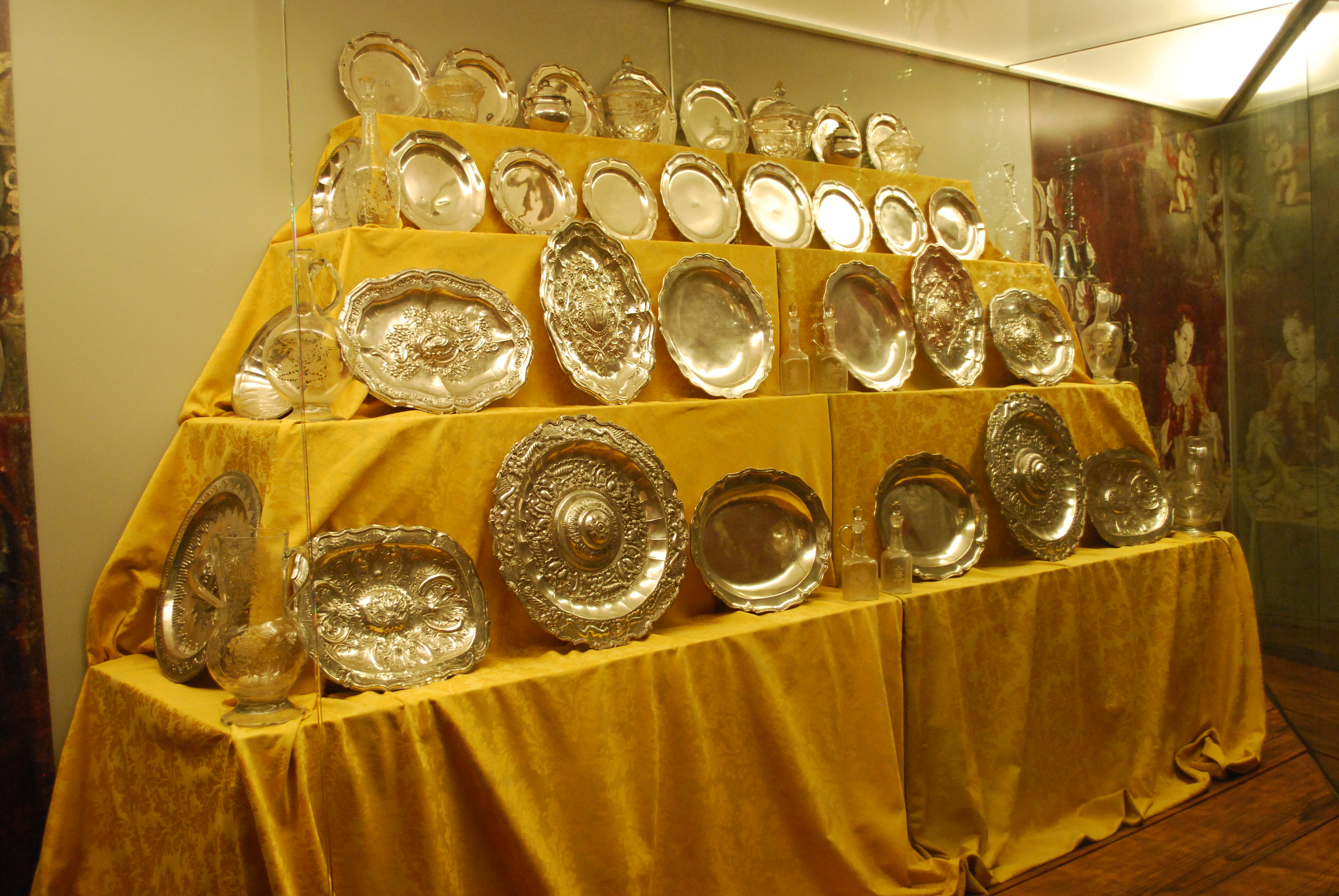
Display of silver dishes at the Franz Mayer Museum

Despite down from its peak in the colonial era, Mexico is still the number one producer of silver in the world. Silver pieces made in Mexico include candelabras, jars, platters, necklaces and buttons for charro outfits. Traditional silver work in Mexico has its origins in the colonial period, as the metal was not particularly prized in the Mesoamerican era. Mexican silver from the colonial era to the present can be found in many museum collections around the world. There are still artisans which still make silver pieces in the style of the 17th and 18th centuries. However, these kind of work tends to bring more fame than money. Globalization has affected the design of silver pieces in Mexico as much of it is exported. Most Mexican silver work today is updated designs, a trend that dates from the work of William Spratling in Taxco, making Mexico again a center of export for finished pieces. The tradition continues here, with some schools that teach the trade but most smiths learn through a term of apprenticeship, often as a part of the family business. Taxco has been designated a Pueblo Mágico in part because of its silver work, and it is home to the William Spratling Museum, which has a collection of this silver work.

The number of artisans who can do traditional Mexican silver work is dwindling. To help preserve the tradition, every two years the Hugo Salinas Price National Silver Prize is awarded to Mexican silversmiths in various categories. It is sponsored by the Fomento Cultural Grupo Salinas, the Secretaría de Desarrollo Social (SEDESOL), the Fondo Nacional para el Fomento de las Artesanías (FONART) and the Museo de Arte Popular. The purpose is to promote the craft in the country both in Mexico and abroad.

== Copper ==
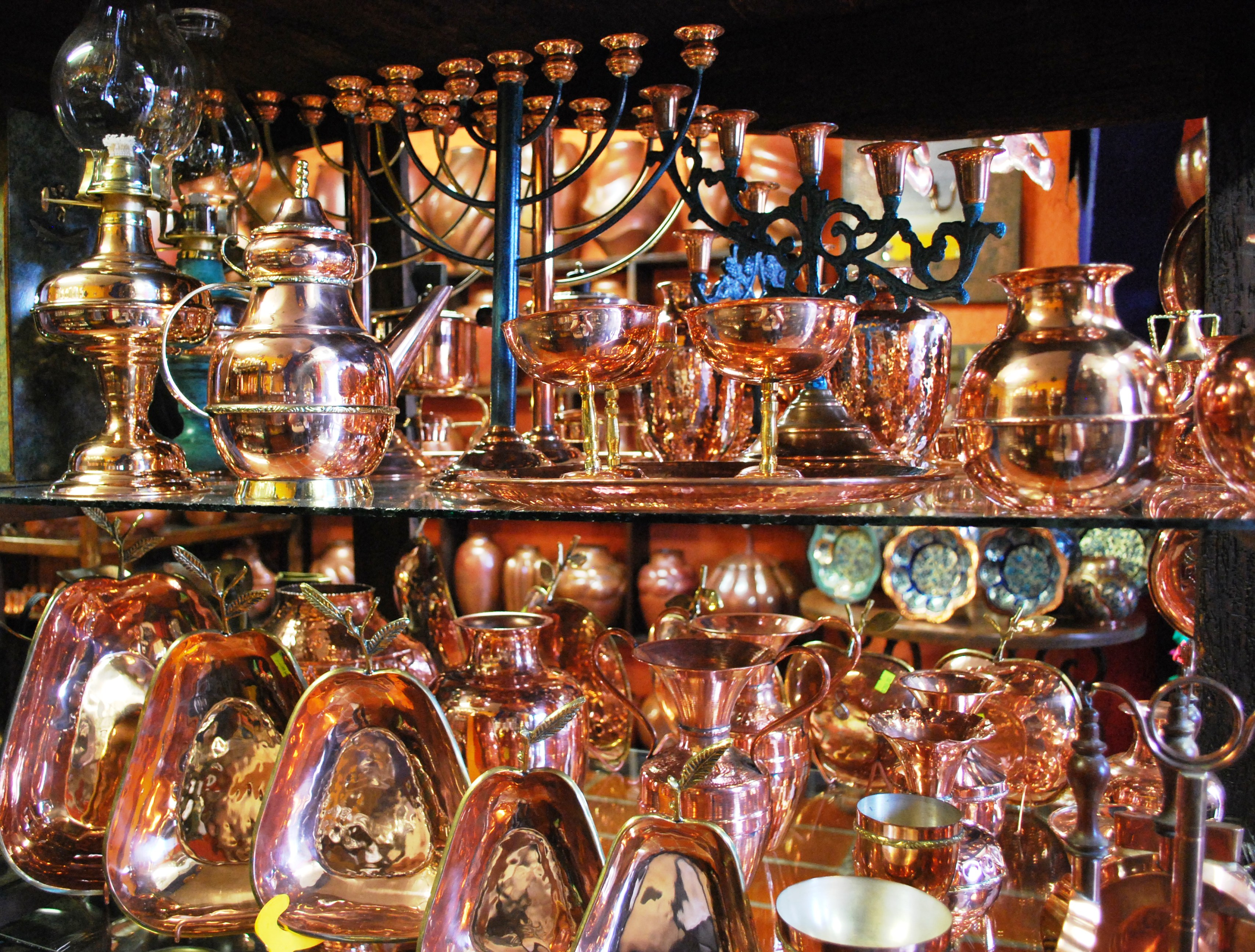
Copper products for sale in Santa Clara del Cobre, Michoacán

While copper was worked in some parts of Mesoamerica, modern Mexican tradition is Spanish in origin. Copper working was initially ignored by the Spanish conquistadors as they were looking for gold and silver. It was not shipped to Spain as much as the other two. Instead, it eventually became important for the creation of utilitarian items, especially domestic items such as pots and pans. Today, the center of traditional copper work in Mexico is the state of Michoacán, especially the municipality of Santa Clara del Cobre. One traditional hammered copper object is a large vessel in which pork fat is rendered or sugar caramelized for making candies. Every year during the month of August Santa Clara del Cobre holds a copper festival.

== Iron ==
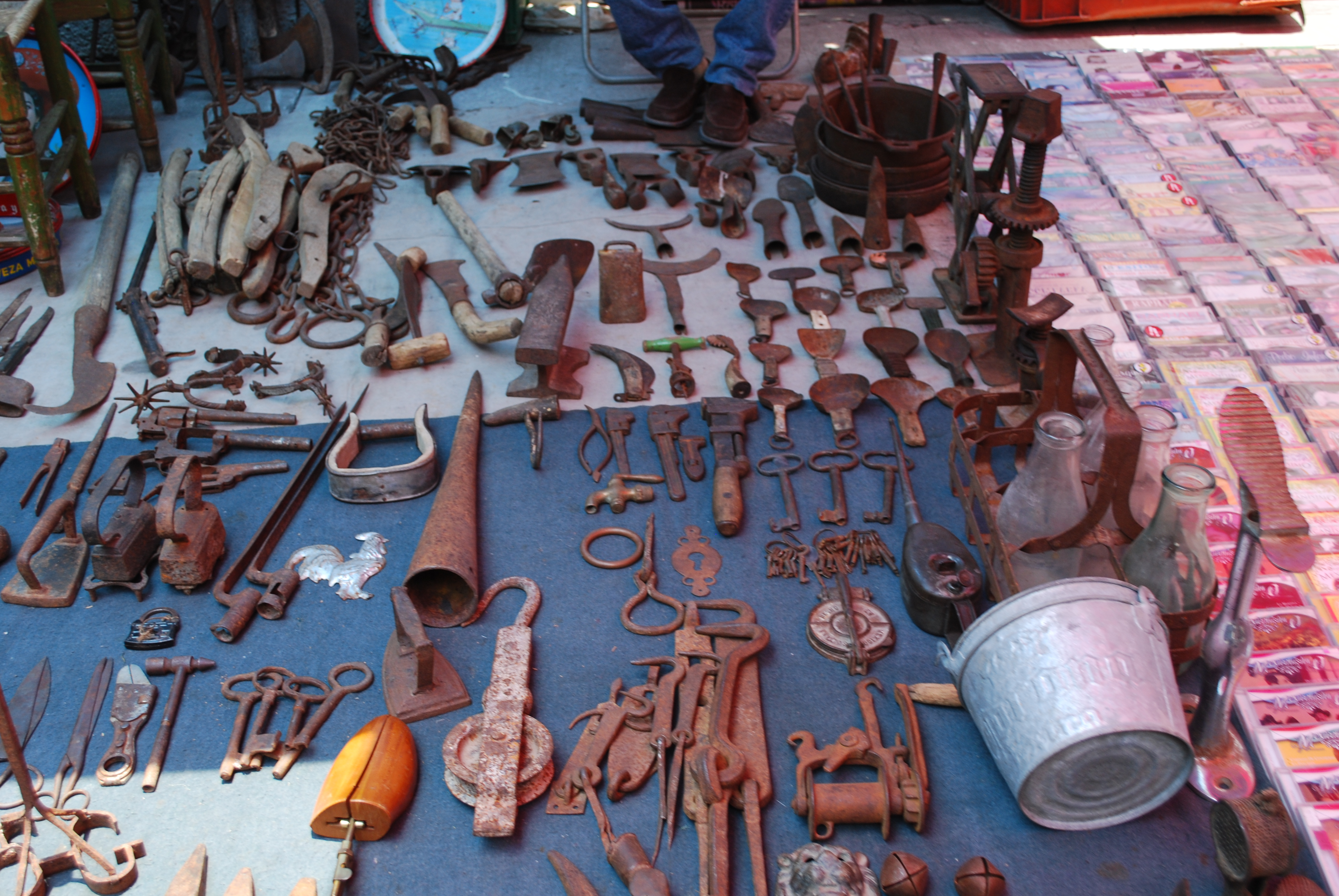
Antique iron tools and other items at the La Lagunilla Market, Mexico City

Iron was not worked in the Mesoamerican period, with its mining and working introduced by the Spanish. Exploration of the metal was initially banned to protect the industry in Spain, but as tools made from the metal were essential for exploration and conquest, the prohibition was soon ignored. Initially the items were purely utilitarian such as tools, locks, horseshoes and tools. Later in the colonial period, iron began to be used in other ways, including decorative elements in churches and mansions such as railings and balconies. The height of traditional Mexican ironworking was in the 17 and 18th centuries.

Initially the main iron working centers were Puebla and Oaxaca. Oaxacan iron was exceptionally malleable and light allowing for intricate designs and tools not possible with other types of iron. Most Oaxacan iron objects date from the 17th and 18th centuries and include locks, furniture and scissors, often with intricate designs etched on them.

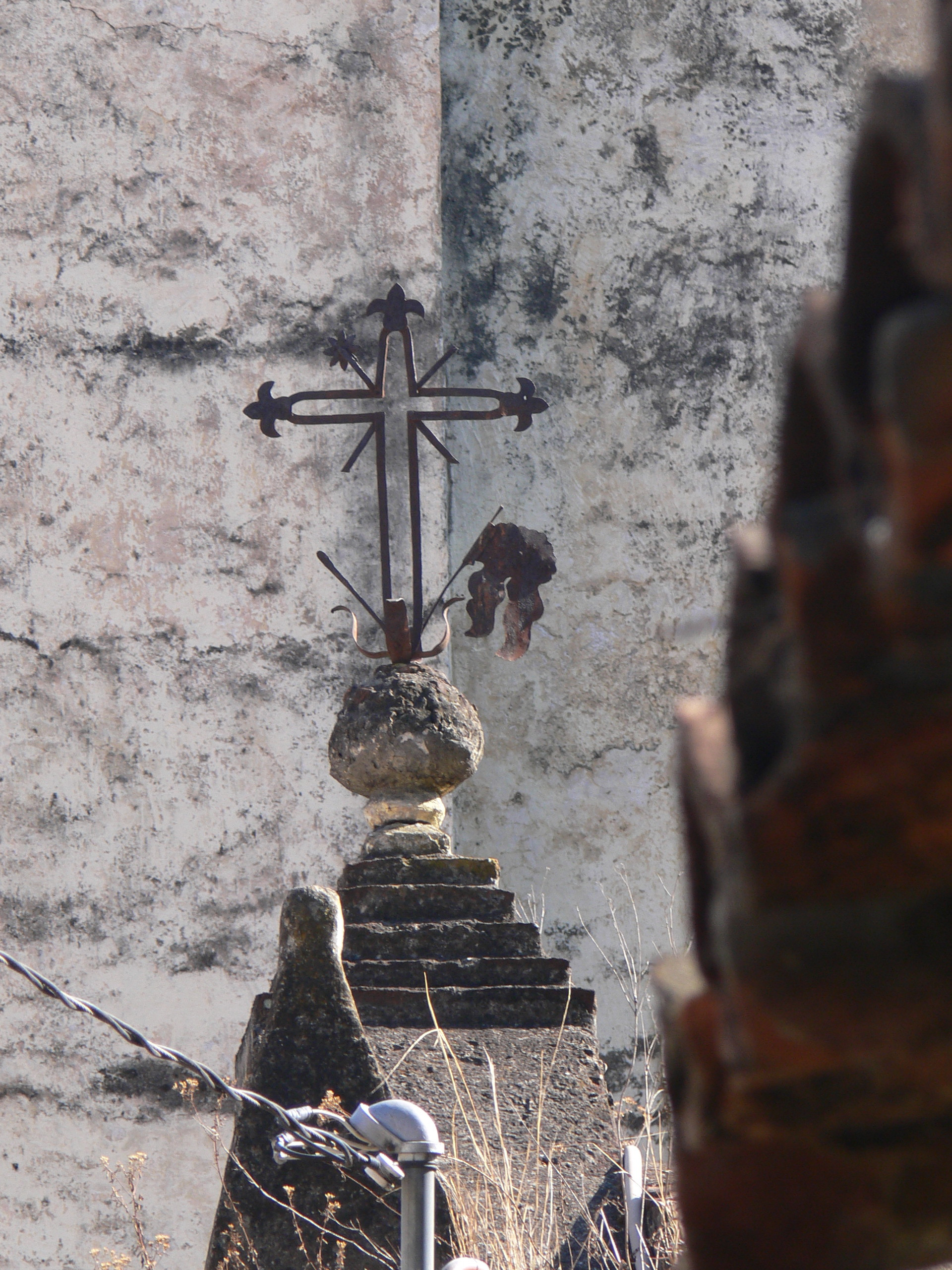
Iron cross on the Templo de Caridad in San Cristobal de las Casas

By the end of the 18th century, there were important iron working centers in Oaxaca, Puebla, Mexico City, Guanajuato and Querétaro, as well as western Mexico such as Guadalajara, Zacatecas and Aguascalientes, which eventually developed its own style. Western Mexican ironwork is distinguished by oriental influence due to trade with Manila as well as the use of iron for decorative purposes on wooden objects.

Handcrafted wrought iron is still important in San Miguel de Allende, Leon, city of Guanajuato, Guadalajara, Teocaltiche, Jalisco, Morelia, San Felipe de los Herreros, Michoacán, Mexico City, Puebla and Amozoc de Mota. It is used to make garden and home furniture, lamps, chimneys and chimney tools. San Cristobal de las Casas is known for the creation of intricate crosses made of wrought iron, popular as symbols of divine protection.

== Tin ==
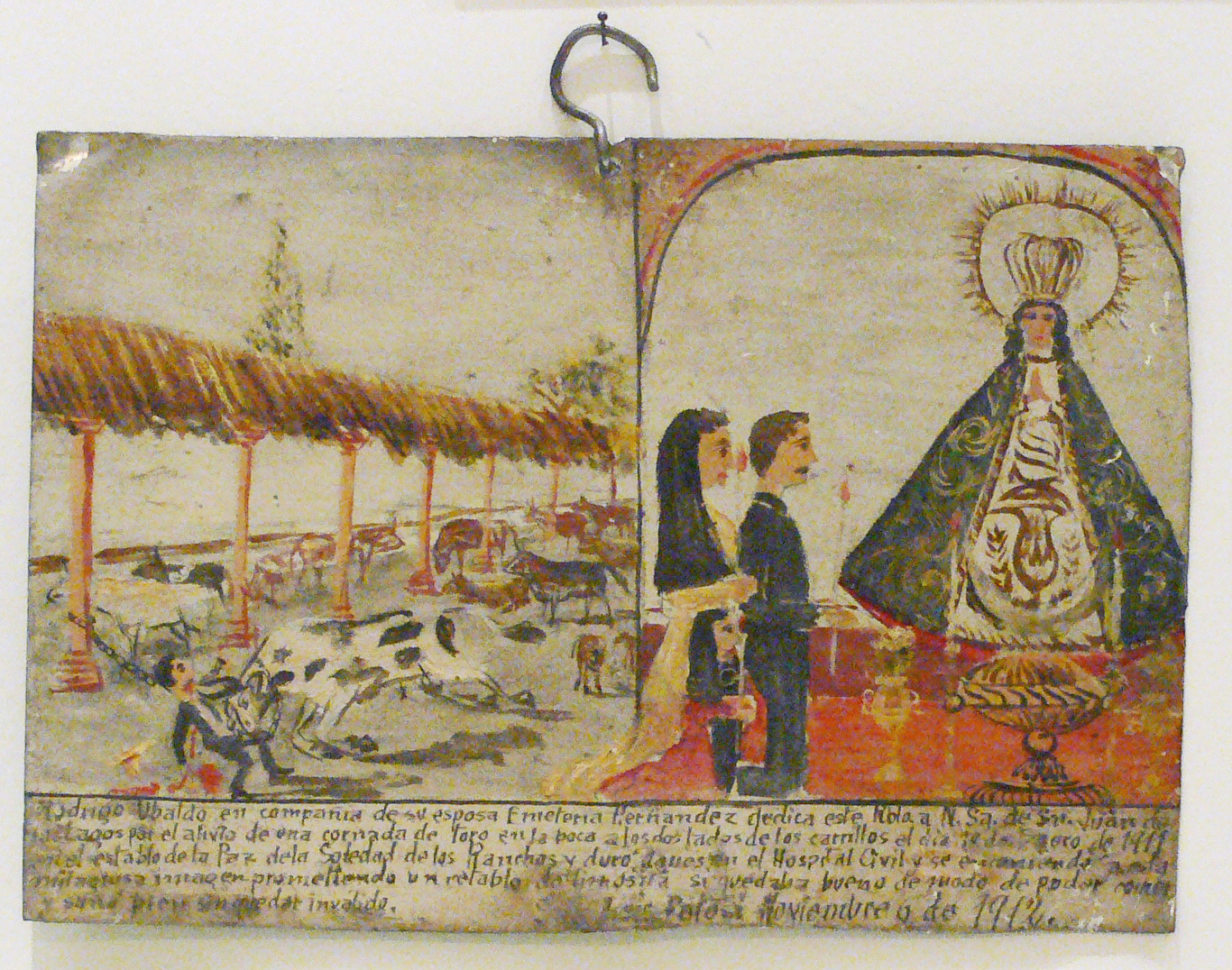
Traditional votive painting on tin from 1911

In the colonial period, tin was worked for its functional rather than aesthetic value. It was created and sold in standard sheets, which were then cut, folded and joined to make various objects. These sheets also became a traditional base for folk ex votos. Today, tin and other sheet metals, often from industrial waste, is still used to create decorative and functional objects such as castles, churches, masks, airplane models, saints, nativity scenes, contains, mirror frames, chandeliers, lamps, trays and plates. Another important line is toys, which are painted in bright enamels, especially in Celaya and San Miguel de Allende. Other important centers include Oaxaca, Irapuato, Mexico City, Puebla, Tlaxcala and Tlaquepaque .

== Other metals ==
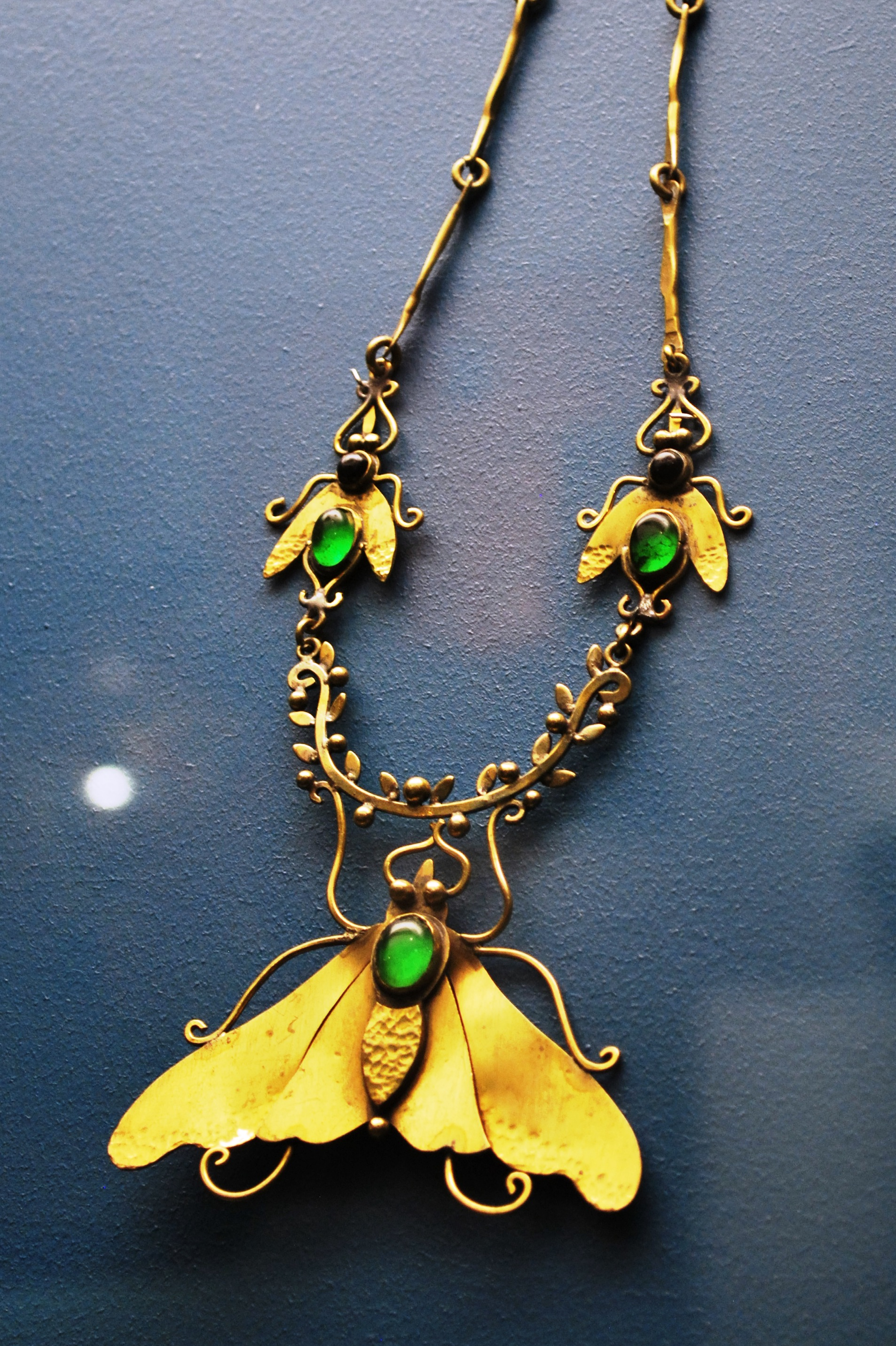
Necklace with brass insect decoration at the Museo de Arte Popular

Brass, tin and iron are used to create old fashioned lamps, decorative items for the home as well as furniture and sculptures. The creation of brass and bronze objects was introduced by the Spanish. Bronze was mostly used for the casting of church bells, some tools and decorative elements on iron railings. The indigenous adapted it to the use of small bells used in ceremonial dances. Brass was used for many different types of implements, mostly for domestic use.

Lead miniature figures are made for collectors although originally they are created as toys for children. They typically include soldiers, furniture, boats, machines and more in Romantic styles from the 19th century and before. Celaya makes a wide variety of miniature for doll houses including figures, furniture, and decorations. Another popular line is toy soldiers. Most pieces are made with molds, some of which date from the 19th century, then painted.

The main producer of handcrafted metal eating utensils is the city of Oaxaca, with fine silverware produced in Taxco. Other areas that make this are in Cualac, Ciudad Altamirano, Ayutla, and Tecpan de Galeana in Guerrero, especially blades such as utility knives and machetes.

== See also ==
- Taxco school of silver design

== Bibliography ==
- Aprahamian, Peter (2000). Mexican Style:Creative ideas for enhancing your space. New York: Universe Publishing. p. 58. ISBN 978-0-7893-0402-5.
- Arte del Pueblo: Manos de Dios. Mexico City: Museo de Arte Popular. 2004. ISBN 968 5059 88 8.
- Ruiz de Esparza, José (1995). México de oro y plata. Mexico City: JGH Editores. ISBN 968 7535 38 5.
