= Villa Hidalgo, Oaxaca =

Villa Hidalgo, Oaxaca may refer to:

- Chalcatongo de Hidalgo, part of the Tlaxiaco District, Mexico
- Hidalgo Yalalag, near Villa Alta District, Mexico
- Villa Hidalgo Municipality, Oaxaca

== See also ==
- Villa Hidalgo (disambiguation)
