= Pellicer =

Pellicer is a surname. Notable people with the surname include:

- Ana Pellicer (1946–2025), Mexican sculptor, artisan, and jewelry maker
- Carlos Pellicer (1897–1977), Mexican poet
- Iván Pellicer (born 1997), Spanish actor
- José Pellicer (1912–1942), Valencian anarchist
- Olga Pellicer, Mexican diplomat
- Pilar Pellicer (1938–2020), Mexican actress
- Pina Pellicer (1934–1964), Mexican actress

== See also ==
- Pellicier
