= Pellicier =

Pellicier is a surname. Notable people with the surname include:

- Alexandre Pellicier (born 1981), French ski mountaineer
- Guillaume Pellicier (aka Pellissier, c. 1490–1568), French prelate and diplomat
- Osmaidel Pellicier (born 1992), Cuban sprinter

== See also ==
- Pellicer
