= Punzo family (copper crafts) =

Coordinates: 19°24′20.76″N 101°38′24.36″W

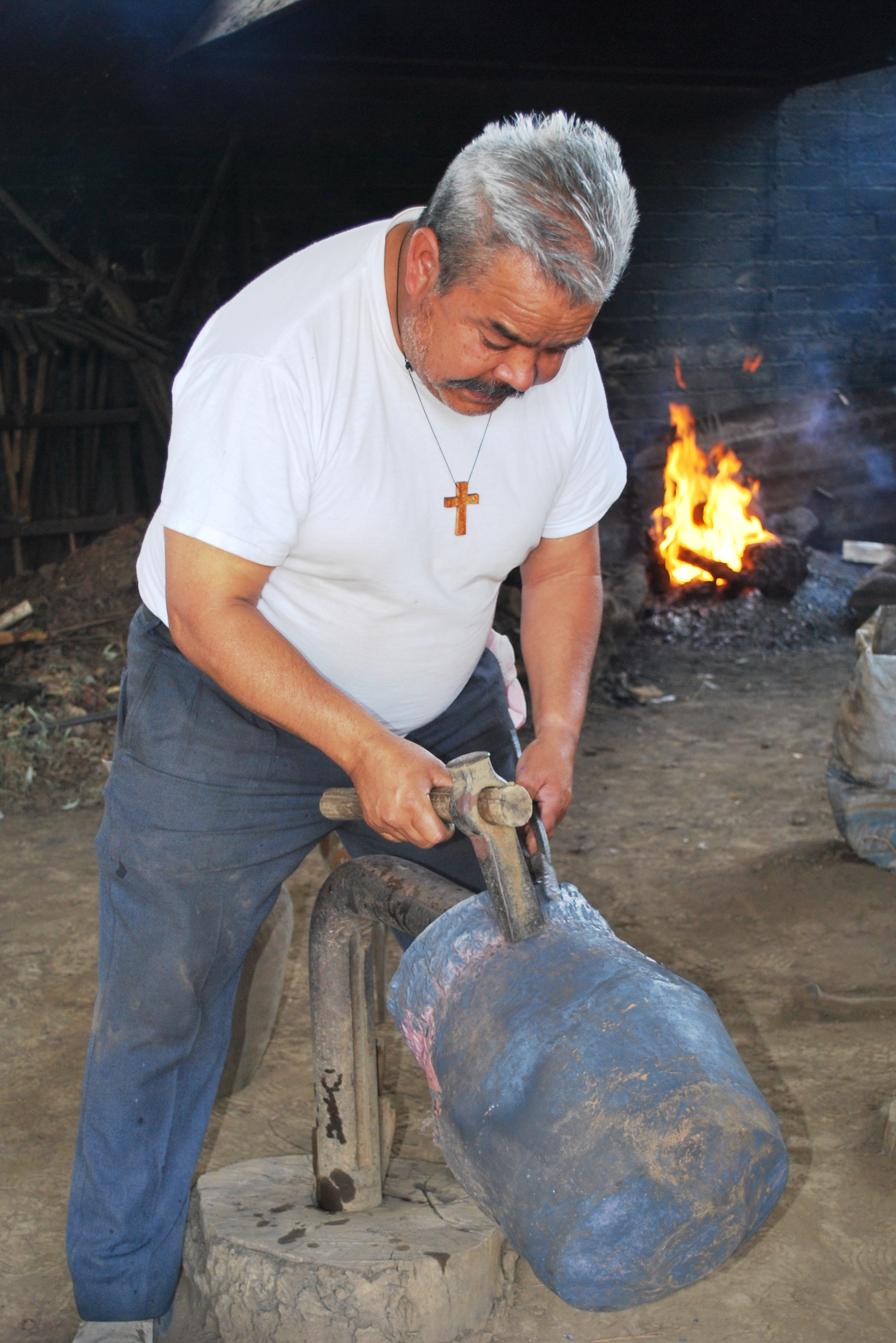
Abdón Punzo Ángel working on a piece in his shop

The Punzo family contains two of the best known copper and silver smiths located in Santa Clara del Cobre, Michoacán, Mexico. The family descends from copper smith Carlos Punzo Córdoba. The two main smiths today are brothers Abdón Punzo Ángel and Ignacio Punzo Ángel, each of whom has his own workshop in which their sons and grandsons work and learn the craft of working copper and silver.

Their workshops are located in the town of Santa Clara del Cobre, which is about twelve km from Pátzcuaro and part of a region with a long history of handcrafts, passed down generations. Each of the various towns has its own specialty and for Santa Clara del Cobre, it is copper working, with over fifty workshops that employ more than 300 artisans, or about eighty percent of the town's workforce. The town is known worldwide for its copper work, using traditional methods in open air workshops. Hammers, tongs and other tools are found on workshop walls and tables and the copper is heated in a large wood-fired forge.(gmasters329-330) As the region no longer mines copper, the raw material is scrap copper from old autos and cable, which he buys from telephone and electrical companies. Sledgehammers are used to pound blocks of copper to start and very fine hammers and awls are used for delicate details. Pieces are reheated as necessary as the pieces is pounded into shape. Decorative shapes such as animals are tapped outside the vessel from the inside and then backed with a substance called chapopote to keep the shape as the minute details are tapped in from the outside.

Almost all of the objects are hammered into shape from a single piece or block of copper, including details like handles and decorative figures which are shaped along with the main body. This eliminates the need for soldering. The embossing, also called repoussé and chasing, is a form of decorating the basic shape of a vessel or other piece. It consists of hammering the piece from the inside to push the shape outwards. After this shape is made, details are added by chiseling and engraving. Then the copper pieces are put into a large pot of boiling water in order to give them their distinctive color. To give pieces an added shine, they are treated with sulfuric acid, soap, water and steel wool.

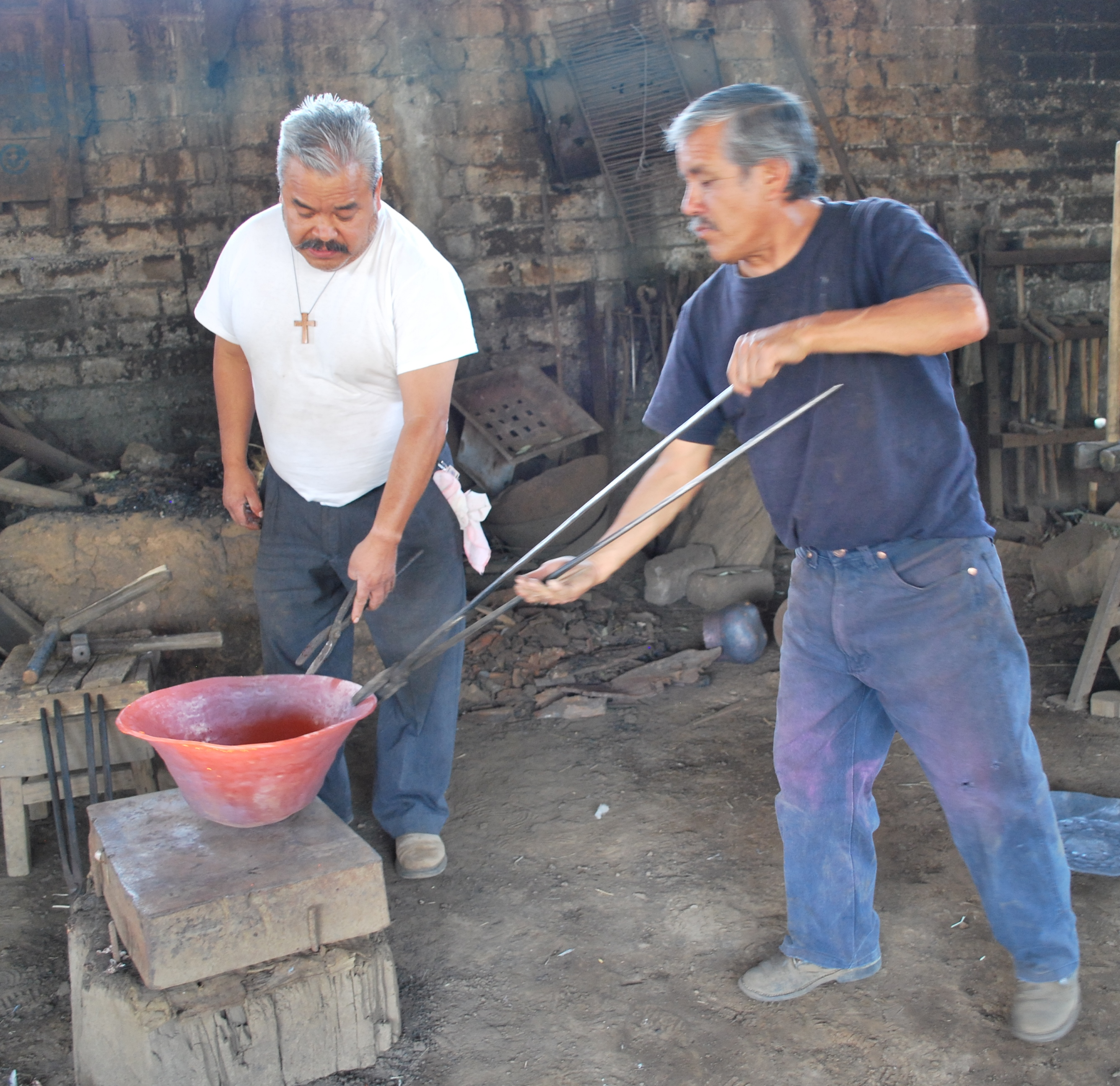
Punzo Ángel and employee with red-hot copper piece

Abdón Punzo Angel's workshop/gallery is called El Arte del Cobre on Morelos street. He is considered to be one of the best coppersmiths in Santa Clara del Cobre, working with his sons and about twelve employees. Punzo and his sons have won many awards for their work in both Mexico and abroad. He has made two presentation in Albuquerque, New Mexico . He won the Quinto Premio Nacional de la Plata 2010 Hugo Salinas Price at the Museo de Arte Popular with his son Alan Punzo Chávez winning the Galardón Nacional Joven Talento the same year. His other son, José Abdón Punzo Chávez won the Orfefrería Artesanal and Escultura Artesanal prizes.

Prices for pieces run from US$40 for a platter to $900 for a large vase. All pieces are hammered into shape and hand-burnished. Work on a single piece can take two weeks. The workshop has had a number of famous clients including former Mexican president Carlos Salinas de Gortari.

Abdón sons, José Abdon, Carlos, and Luis Felipe all began working with their father at a very young age. His son Luis Felipe Punzo Chávez has won awards for his work, for pieces that can take months to create. He is one of many artisans supported by the Casa de las Artesanías, a state agency in Morelia . Abdón Punzo states that his son Carlos Punzo Chávez has come close to beating him in past contests. On one occasion, an interview asked Abdón what he would have done if his son had beaten him and he said that it would have meant more than the prize.

Ignacio Punza Ángel also is a smith who works with his sons in Santa Clara. He began learning to work copper in his father's shop as a small child and learned to work silver starting at age 17. He creates mostly large pieces with innovative designs with are often detailed. He also works in silver in which he has received a large number of acknowledgements and awards. He has taught the craft to his three sons, José Rosaldo, José Germán and Ignacio Gabriel. He has exhibited his work in various parts of Mexico and the United States and has won the Premio Estatal de Artesanías and the Premio de Casa de las Artesanías de Morelia as well as various prizes related to the National Copper Fair held each year in Santa Clara and the National Silver Contest in Taxco .

== See also ==
List of Mexican artisans
