= James Metcalf (artist) =

American artist

James "Jimmy" Metcalf (March 11, 1925 – January 27, 2012) was an American sculptor, artist and educator. Metcalf established and led a community for copper artisans in Santa Clara del Cobre, Michoacán, Mexico, from the 1970s until his death in 2012.

Metcalf was born in New York City. His parents were both stained glass artists, most notably contributing to the windows for the Cathedral of St. John the Divine. Metcalf took up art and sculpture as a teenager. He enlisted in the 88th Infantry Division of the United States Army, nicknamed the Blue Devils, when he was 18 years old. Metcalf fought in northern Italy during World War II, and lost three of his fingers during combat at Furlo Pass.

Metcalf attended the Pennsylvania Academy of the Fine Arts in Philadelphia and then enrolled at the Central School of Arts and Crafts in London. He was awarded a fellowship to study ancient metallurgy and essentially moved to Deya, Majorca, in 1953. There he befriended and collaborated with writer Robert Graves on his work, Adam's Rib, published in 1955. Metcalf lived in Paris from 1956 to 1965, where he located his studio at the Impasse Ronsin.

In 1957, Metcalf was awarded a grant by the William and Noma Copley Foundation, which published a monograph of his art in 1960.

By 1965, Metcalf was an accomplished sculptor, with a studio on Spring Street in SoHo. However, he was tired of contemporary art and moved to Mexico, including Mexico City. He became friends with prominent writers and artists, including Carlos Fuentes and Carlos Pellicer, and was the first to introduce Octavio Paz to Marcel Duchamp. Metcalf won the commission to forge the Olympic torch for the 1968 Summer Olympics in Mexico City. He was married to Mexican actress Pilar Pellicer, his third wife, with whom he had two sons and one daughter. Metcalf later married Pilar Pellicar's younger sister, sculptor Ana Pellicer, his fourth wife.

Metcalf opened a studio and forge in 1967, where he taught artists how to create vases with a thick edge called El Borde Grueso. In 1973, Melcalf and Anna Pellicer founded Casa de Artesana and a school. which would become known as the Adolfo Best Maugard School of Arts and Crafts in Santa Clara del Cobre, to promote indigenous artists and pre-Columbian coppersmithing and forging techniques. Their work has been credited with preserving the metalworking of the region.

Metcalf died in Santa Clara del Cobre, Michoacan, on January 27, 2012, at the age of 86. He was survived by his wife, Ana Pellicer. He was buried in Santa Clara del Cobre, near several of his sculptures.
