= Ana Pellicer =

Mexican sculptor (1946–2025)

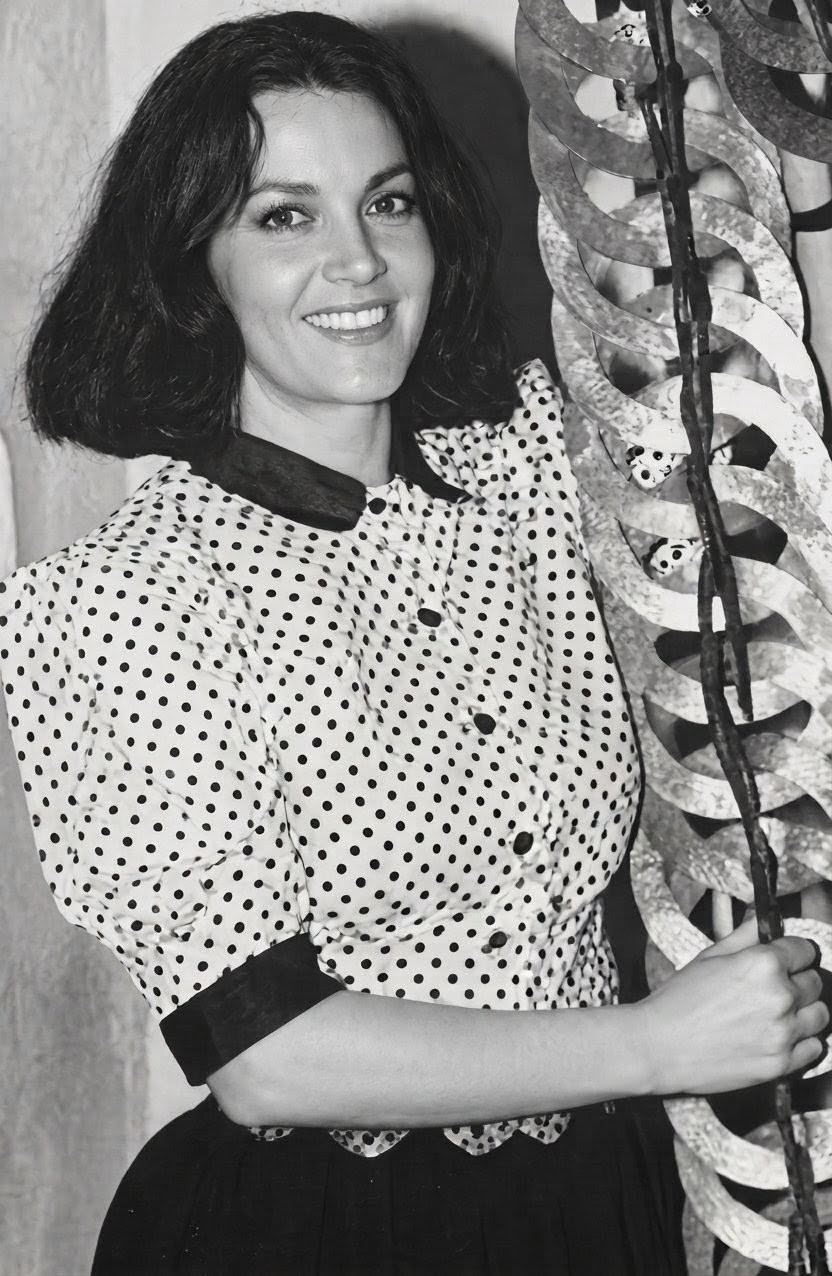
- Pellicer in the 1970s
- Born: Ana Emilia Pellicer López de Llergo; 2 March 1946; Mexico City, Mexico
- Died: 6 May 2025 (aged 79); Santa Clara del Cobre, Michoacán, México
- Occupation: Sculptor; artisal; jewelry maker
- Spouse: James Metcalf
- Relatives: Pina Pellicer (sister); Pilar Pellicer (sister); Carlos Pellicer (uncle)

Ana Emilia Pellicer López de Llergo (2 March 1946 – 6 May 2025) was a Mexican sculptor, jewelry maker, artisan and forest conservationist. Pellicer spent most of her life helping the community of Santa Clara del Cobre, Michoacán. She spent her years there experimenting with amate paper, wood, and copper.

== Background ==
Ana Pellicer was born in Mexico City on 2 March 1946. She had two sisters, Pina Pellicer and Pilar Pellicer, both of whom became actresses. Her parents were Pilar López Llergo and César Pellicer Sánchez. She met her sculptor husband in Santa Clara del Cobre: James Metcalf who died in 2012, at the age of 86. She won multiple awards and established an art school named the Adolfo Best Maugard School of Arts and Crafts (Escuela de Artes y Oficios Adolfo Best Maugard) with her husband which taught the traditional coppersmith techniques.

She also helped establish a source of income for the women in Santa Clara by teaching them to make jewelry and how to sell it. She spent the last of her days reviving a forest in Santa Clara to help with the environment but also for artisans to continue with traditional coppersmith techniques by using the branches from these trees to produce coal, a necessary element for the process of smelting copper.

On 9 May 2025, it was announced that Pellicer had died at the age of 79.

== Education ==
Ana Pellicer earned a degree in psychology at the Universidad Iberoamericana, Mexico City. She then moved to New York soon after where she fell in love with the art museums and then decided to go back to school and pursue art where she learned to be a sculptor and where she studied plastic arts. She got a degree from The New School for Social Research and The Art Students League in New York. She then returned to Mexico in 1967 and took engraving courses, where she had her first interaction with copper. Shortly after, she moved to Santa Clara del Cobre to study with James Metcalf, who had already established a workshop with other local artisans using traditional coppersmith techniques.

== Work in Santa Clara del Cobre ==
Once in Santa Clara del Cobre, Pellicer learned the traditional technique of coppersmith and was the only woman in these workshops that worked with skilled men artisans. She worked alongside her soon to be husband and together created works that helped the community for years to come.

In 1968, the coppersmith artisans had the opportunity to create the cauldron for the Olympics which was being held in Mexico. This commission gave the work of Santa Clara del Cobre attention and respect for the traditional coppersmith technique.

La Maquina Enamorada (The Machine in Love) 1975, is a sculpture piece that was commissioned by Francisco Trouyet. This piece was the largest work that they had produced and it was also the first one that was presented in the Museum of Modern Art, Mexico City. Ana worked on this project with the other artisans from Santa Clara, and with this project she eventually earned the respect from the other coppersmiths.

After earning the respect of the male artisans, Pellicer took on the challenge of helping the women of Santa Clara by teaching them how to make copper jewelry. This caused a lot of feuds with the men from the town, but eventually they came around and respected the new source of income. The women from Santa Clara started selling the jewelry and started winning competitions in the local fairs. The school established by Pellicer and Metcalf is where the jewelry program started and eventually the school revolved around this craft. They added a day care center to the school, so now single mothers had a place for their children to be taken care of as they learned how to make jewelry.

She continued to live in Santa Clara del Cobre, a town that she adopted as hers. She restored the forest in hopes to bring better air and a better environment for the town; she planted trees that are now over 8 years old. The branches from these trees are used to create coal, a material needed to continue the traditional coppersmith techniques.

== Solo exhibitions ==
=== Poemas Forjados (Hand-wrought Poems) Exhibition ===
Poemas Forjados is an exhibition that took place on 27 March 2010 at the Palacio Clavijero in Morelia. Ana displays different themes in this work, she speaks of women empowerment, self-identity, and Mexican culture. There is a total of 75 sculptures in this exhibition with 6 different themes which are: Secretos, Mujer, Luz, Poder, Libertad, and Juego. A couple of works shown in this exhibition are La libertad de Ocumicho (1990) and La libertad Purepecha (1987).

La libertad de Ocumicho is a statue created by Pellicer that evokes both the Virgin of Guadelupe and the Statue of Liberty. The mother-like figure is covered in a blue colored-robe that is filled with copper faces. She is holding a machete in her right hand and bird in the left hand. She stands above a blue box (same color as her robe) that has copper stars all over it. The stance of this statue shows power and strength to Hispanic women.

La libertad Purepecha is a statue that represents the P'urhepeha indigenous woman, but in the style and structure of the Statue of Liberty. She wears a copper necklace, holds an axe in her right hand, copper earrings and is wearing a purple-colored robe. With only up to her torso showing, she is placed above a wooden box. This work of art reflects on the indigenous people and their cultural impact.

=== Ana Pellicer, House of Gaga, Mexico City ===
This exhibition was presented at the House of Gaga, Mexico City. It was displayed from 12 July – 9 September 2017. In this show, Pellicer created jewelry for the Statue of Liberty, but also made work celebrating the statue being gifted to the United States. The work was made in the school she and her husband founded in Santa Clara. Ana had help from the women in this town to help produce the artworks for this exhibition. This was an act of empowerment to these women after constant feuds with their husbands about learning to smelt copper. This exhibition also showed an artwork from her husband, James Metcalf.

== Group exhibitions ==
- Shades of Daphne. Kasmin Gallery, New York. 24 January 2023 – 22 February 2023
- The Den. House of Gaga, Mexico City. 9 December 2022 – January 28, 2023
- The Last Tenant. MASA Gallery, Mexico City. 18 March – 9 May 2021
- Pasiphae. House of Gaga, Mexico City. 22 July – 11 September 2021.
- The Making of Husbands: Christina Ramberg in dialogue. FRAC Lorraine, Metz. 14 February – 5 July 2020.
- Body Armor. MOMA, New York. 3 June – 9 September 2018
- Group Show. Galerie Francesca Pia, Zurich. 2 July – 24 August 2015.
- The Third Convoy. Galerie Francesca Pia, Zurich. 23 January – 8 March 2014

== Awards ==
Premio Estatal de las Artes Eréndira for 2010. First woman to win this award.

Gertrudis Bocanegra 2018 award.
