= Yalalag cross =

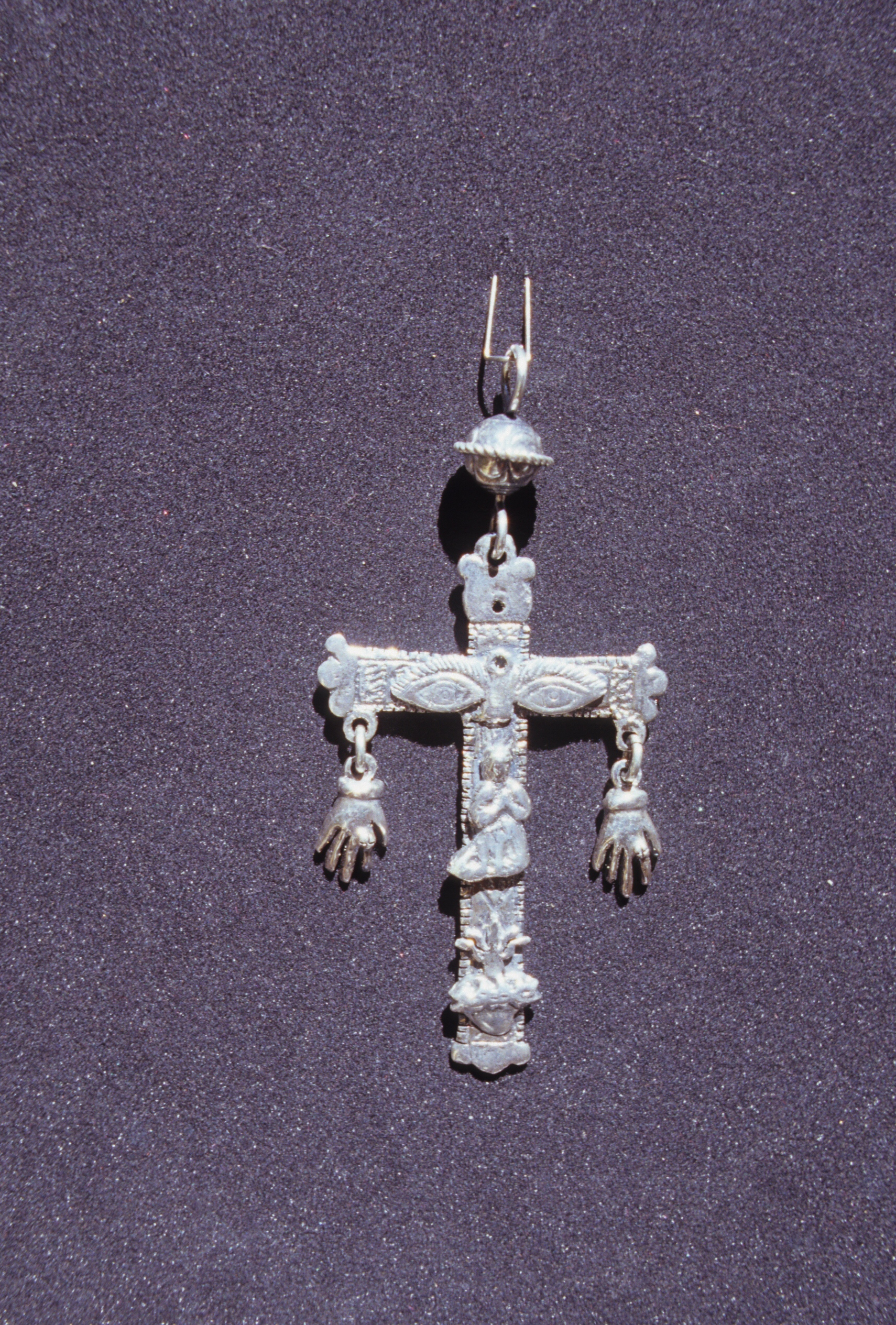
Silver Yalalag style cross pendant.

A Yalalag cross is a particular style of Christian cross made in Yalalag, Oaxaca, Mexico. It is a pendant cross with medals on the arms. The cross is made of heavy, dark coin silver. There are many variations on the basic design; all have crosses or medals hanging from the terminals. Some have pendants larger than the cross itself; often the center will feature a winged heart. They vary in length from 2 to 6 inches. Local women wear the crosses on strings of beads and pendants with birds or pomegranates.

== History ==
The particular crosses have been made in Yalalag since at least the sixteenth century. They have an undetermined origin; similar crosses are worn in Spain, and the design is thought to have been brought to the area by Dominican missionaries who converted the local native population to Christianity. Over time the cross lost its Spanish character and became a Mexican object made by the local natives. Its design predates the conquest of the area by the Spanish. The women of Yalalag are known to have worn triple crosses when they encountered Hernando Cortes' soldiers and priests during their ventures in the area. The priests incorrectly concluded that Christian missionaries had preceded them.
