= Traditional copper work in Mexico =

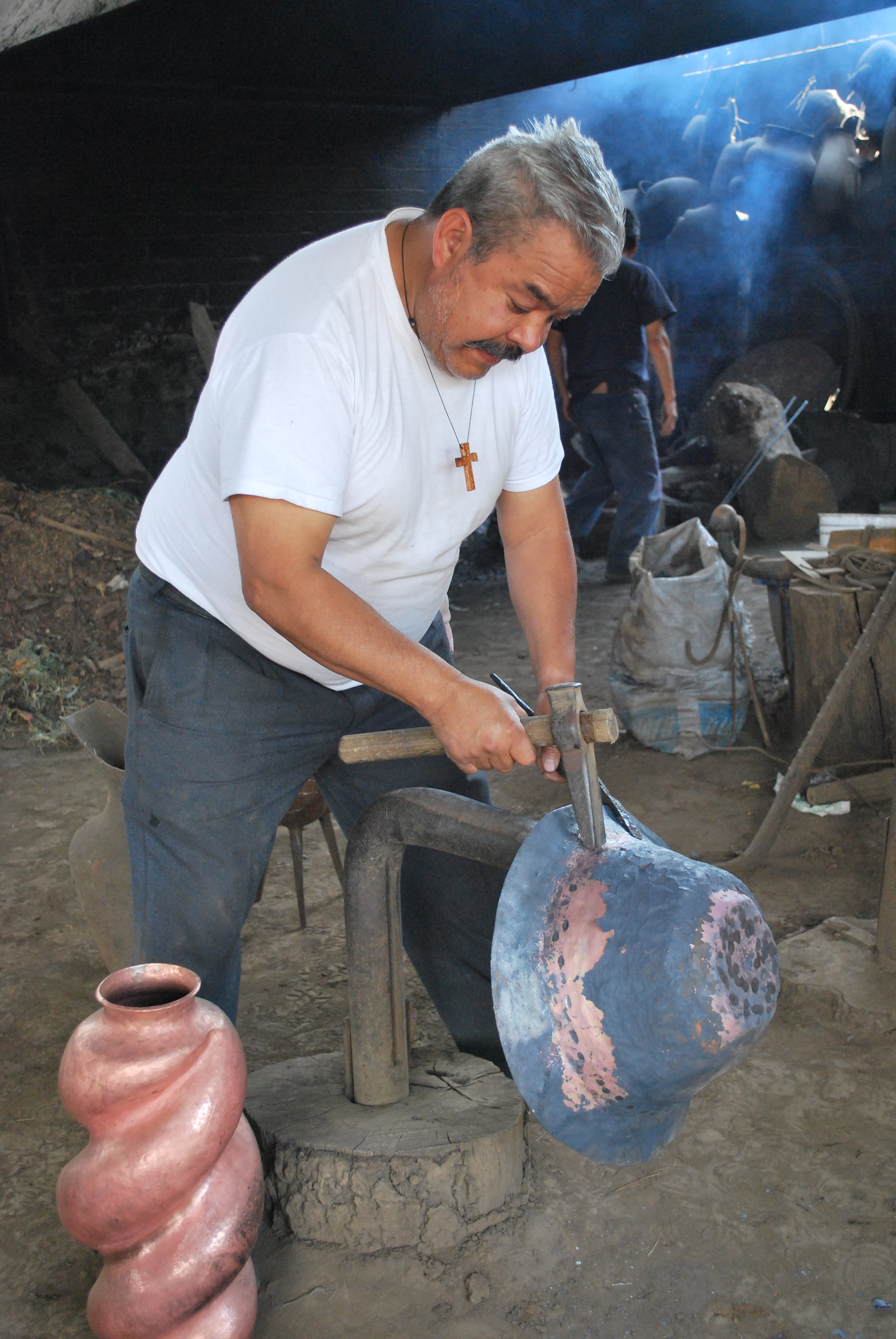
Craftsman Abdón Punzo Ángel working on a piece in his Santa Clara del Cobre workshop

Traditional copper work in Mexico has its origins in the pre Hispanic period, mostly limited to the former Purépecha Empire in what are now the states of Michoacán and Jalisco. The reason for this was that this was the only area where copper could be found on the surface. After the Spanish conquest of the Aztec Empire, the Spanish took control of copper production, introducing European techniques but still needed indigenous labor. Copper work, like other crafts, was principally organized in Michoacán under Vasco de Quiroga. It is not known when the town of Santa Clara del Cobre came to specialize in the production of copper items, but it was well established by the mid 18th century. Copper extraction remained centered on Michoacán during the colonial period but most of the production gave out by the 19th century. After the Mexican Revolution, copper smiths of Santa Clara were limited to working with scrap metal making pots, plates, casseroles and other containers. Today, it remains home to hundreds of copper smiths which work in ways little changed from the colonial period and is home to the annual Feria del Cobre (Copper Fair) in August.

== Pre Hispanic copper working ==
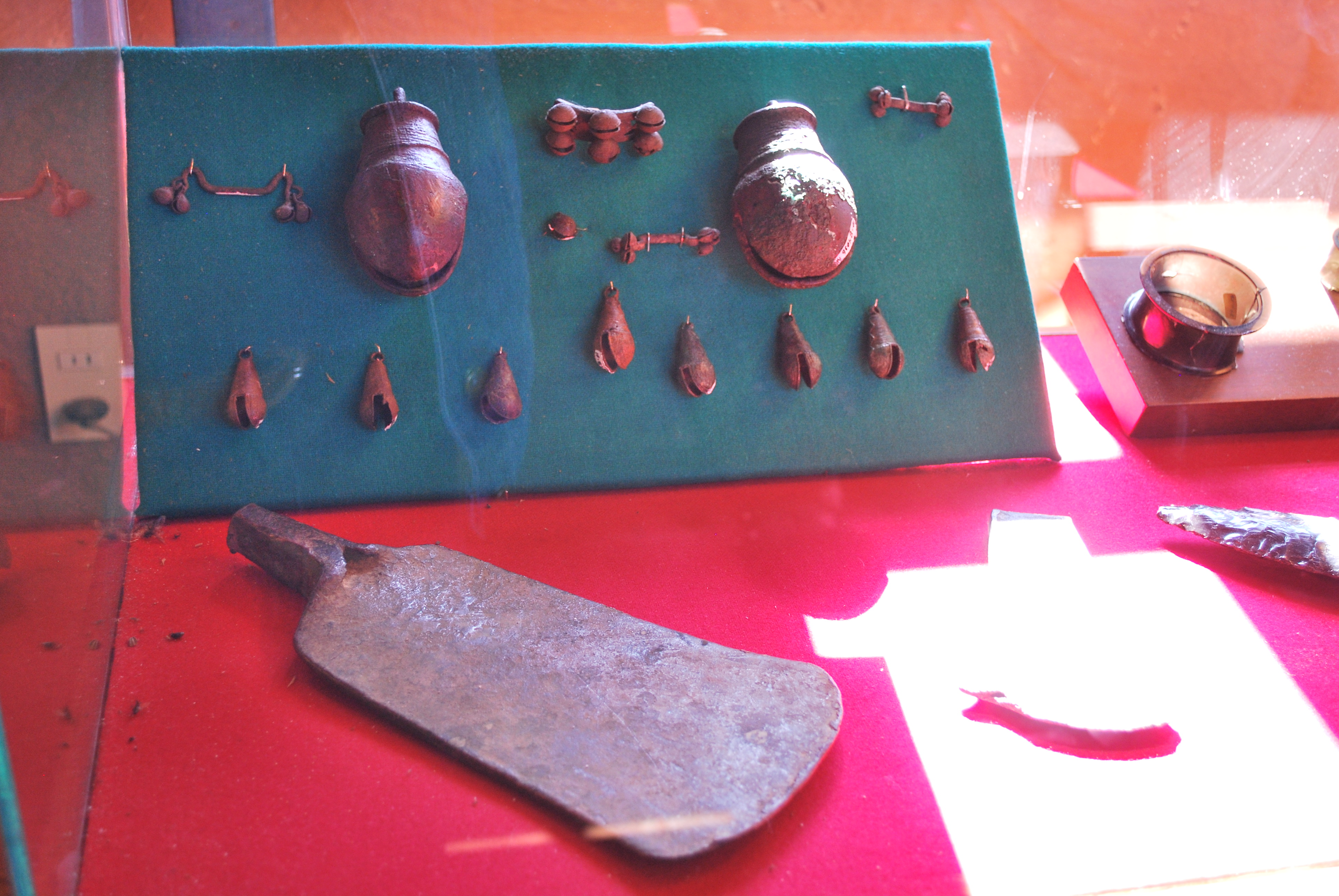
Bronze bells and tools at the site museum of Tzintzuntzan

Copper working has been done in central Mexico since the pre Hispanic period. However, it is not the first area in the Americas to begin working with the metal. The first evidence of copper work is in what is now the Midwest of the United States as the metal was found here fairly easily on the surface without mining. The next location was in the west coastal areas of South America into some areas of Central America, where it wasn't often mixed with gold. Copper working developed later in Mesoamerica because of the lack of surface copper and little to no contact with the copper cultures to the north or south.

The one area in Mesoamerica which had developed copper work before the arrival of the Spanish was in west Mexico in what are now the states of Jalisco and Michoacán, mostly in the Purépecha Empire. Most pre Hispanic copper work occurred in what are now the municipalities of Churumuco, La Huacana, Nuevo Urecho, Tacámbaro and Turicato, with a percentage of this production paid as tribute to the capital at Tzintzuntzan . There is evidence that at least some of this copper and other minerals were extracted from shallow pits or tunnel mines. The Purépecha developed some techniques for extracting copper from rock as well as techniques for shaping it. The working of the metal had advanced enough that it was used for utilitarian objects as well as ornamental and religious ones. The Purépecha made a number of objects from the metal including axes, boxes, fish hooks, knives, small bells, necklaces, bracelets and earrings. Copper was first worked by cold hammering but as copper loses elasticity as it is worked this way, heating was soon discovered to recondition it. The creation of objects by casting was not common for copper but was used to make small delicate objects such as bells.

== Colonial period ==
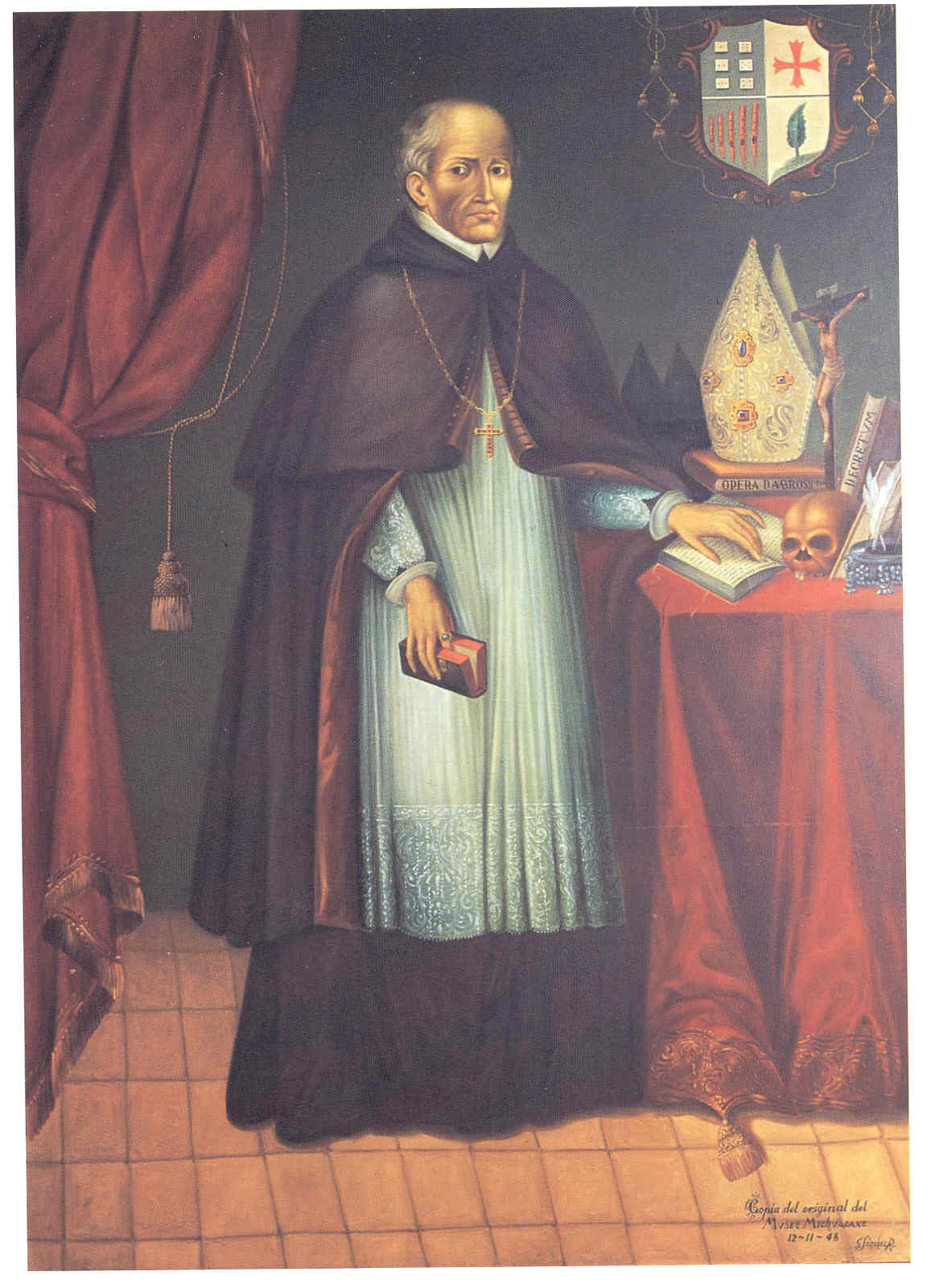
Vasco de Quiroga

During and after the Conquest, the working of the metal by the indigenous was disrupted. Many of the villages of the Pátzcuaro area were abandoned in large part due to the abuses by conquistador Nuño de Guzmán. The Spanish were soon aware of the copper deposits of this region and the indigenous’ ability to work it. Since they were necessary to exploit this wealth, the Spanish worked to bring them back into the area into settled communities under their control. Vasco de Quiroga brought various kinds of craftsmen from Spain to the Pátzcuaro area to develop the region’s economy. Santa Clara founded by friar Francisco de Villafuerte and put under the direct protection of the Spanish Crown. Its foundation would later be attributed to Vasco de Quiroga, probably due to his work establishing copper smithing. The Spanish introduced European smelting techniques and organized the work by family owned workshops, passed down from generation to generation, which remains in effect to this day. Uses for copper during the colonial period was mostly for arms and for cooking utensils. It is not known when Santa Clara began to specialize in copper work as much of its records have been lost due to various fires over its history. The earliest surviving record is from 1748 and notes the working of the metal to be well-developed.

During the colonial period, copper mining was most extensive in Michoacán, continuing the development of the metal started by the Purépecha. Main extraction areas included Tlalpujahua, Tzintzutzan, Charo, Santa Clara del Cobre and Ozumatlán . The copper which was worked in the early colonial period came from mine within a 50 km radius, in ore which was purified in the town. At first this was in Santa Clara itself but later records state that the copper being worked here was coming from Inguarán and Opopeo . The smelting of copper in the area ended by the mid 17th century as the mines gave out.

When mining in Mexico waned during and just after the Mexican War of Independence, copper working survived here. Its prominence ebbed and waned during Mexico’s tumultuous history in the 19th century, with the last of copper mining ending at the end of this same century. Mexico still has large reserves of copper, mostly in the form of sulphides, which have not been mined because of cost.

== Copper work in Santa Clara today ==
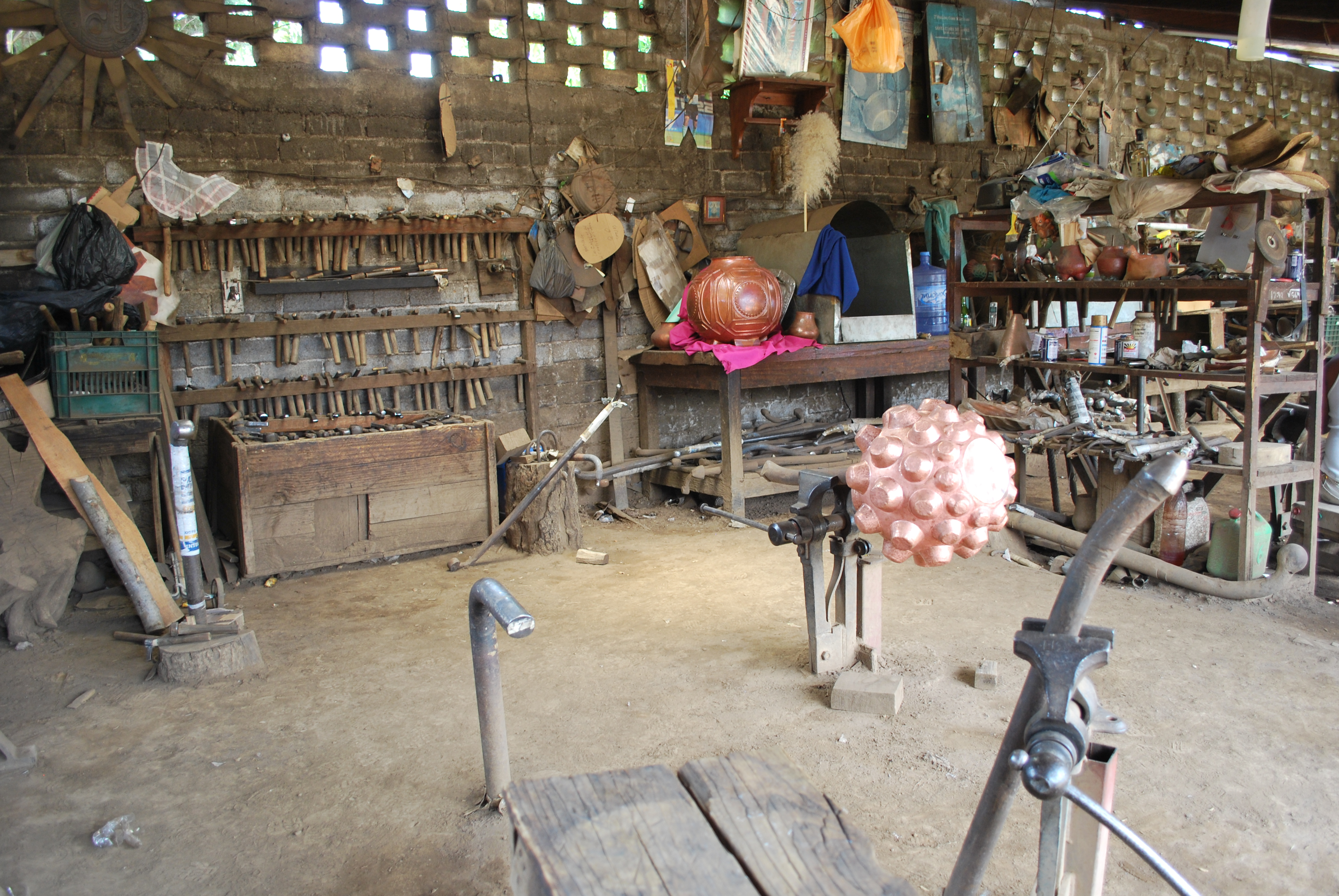
View of a traditional workshop in Santa Clara del Cobre

Santa Clara del Cobre is where traditional copper working in Mexico survives. There are at least 2,000 copper smiths working in over 300 workshops in the municipality. Most of the workshops in the town operate much as they did in the past, receiving various exemption from federal labor laws and tax breaks designed to preserve the craft. The workshops are still independent and family owned with different members in charge of the various tasks such as finance, production and sales. Workshops are roofed areas with few or no walls. This allows protection from rain but allows for ventilation, especially around the forge. These workshops contain a wide variety of tools, many of which are created by the artisans themselves.

After the Mexican Revolution, all residual mining and smelting activities in the area ceased, leaving only the working of already-extracted copper or scrap copper. The copper comes from industrial scrap, including old electrical motors and cables from junkyards and telephone and electrical companies. The process begins by removing the impurities from the scrap metal then placing the pure copper pieces into the center of the forge to be melted together. The material is covered with pine briquettes to produce a fire of an intense and even temperature. The temperature of the fire is raised with the use of bellows, which may still be hand operated. The melted metal is not poured into molds but is molded by the bed of ash which is surrounded by rocks. The use of wood fired forges have diminished the surrounding forests by up to seventy percent.

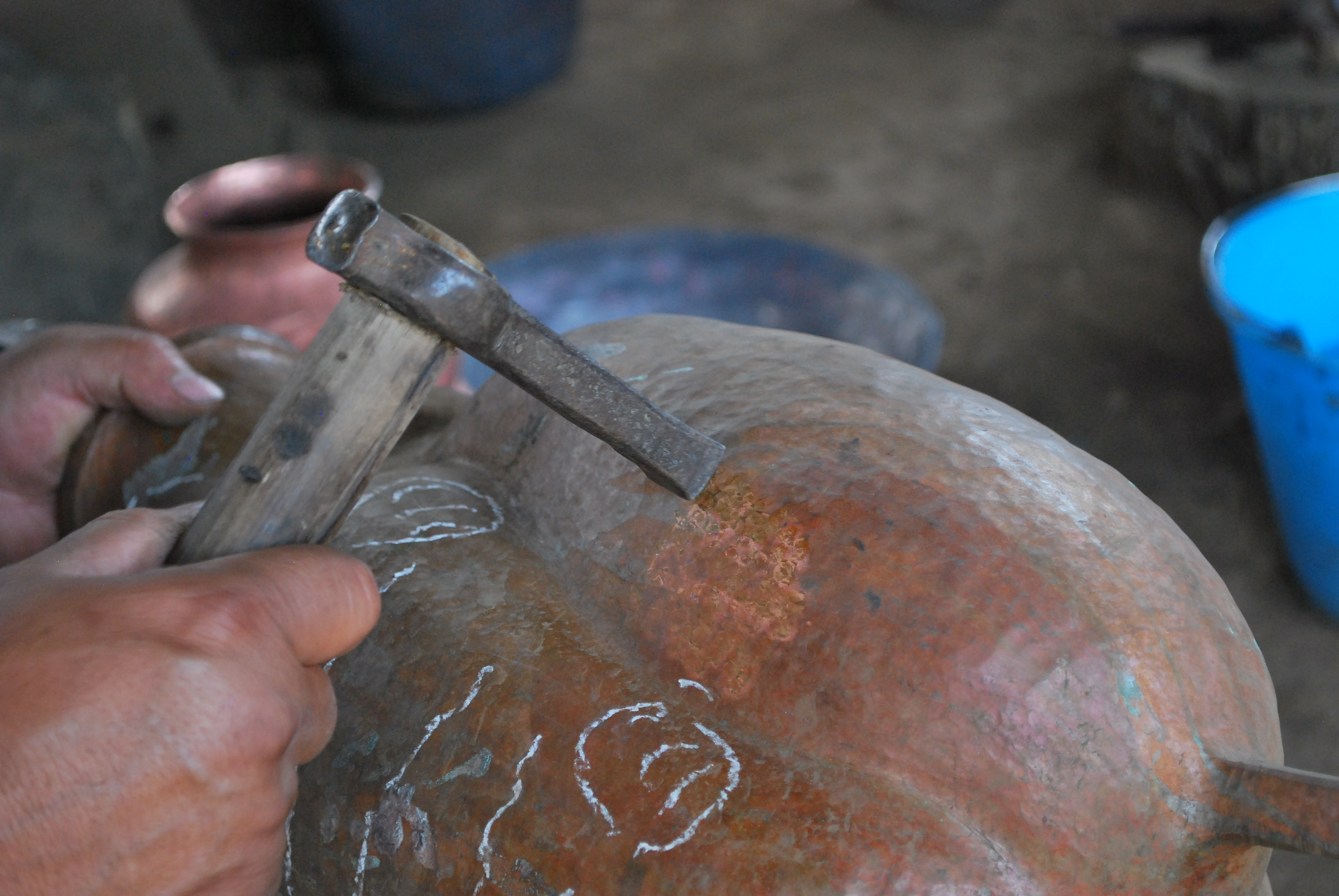
Beginning the decorative process of a vase

The quantity of copper needed for any given piece is carefully calculated before any working begins. The basic process is hammering, thinning out, shaping, trimming, bleaching, polishing and decoration, especially by embossing. To begin work, the block or pieces is heated to red-hot. The first round of hammering is usually to flatten the piece into a circle which is usually done by a group of man wielding sledgehammers. Smaller hammers are used as the piece thins out and to make the sides curve up to form a vessel. The work needs to be precise as it is almost impossible to correct errors in the shaping without starting over. This is particularly true for very small pieces. Sometimes the basic shape includes animal heads or feet to function as handles or stabilizers for the pot. Many different types of tools are used, many of which are made in the same workshop as the copper pieces. They include chisels, pliers, tongs, scissors, shears, punches, mallets, various anvils and hammers which are used to shape and emboss the pieces. Modern techniques can diminish the efforts of thinning out the metal by seventy percent, but most workshops still do it the old fashioned way. After the basic shape is obtained, the decorative and finishing work begins. The embossing, also called repoussé, is a form of decorating the basic shape of a vessel or other piece. It consists of hammering the piece from the inside to push the shape outwards. After this shape is made, details are added by chiseling and engraving. Etching may be done with acid or with a chisel. To give pieces an added shine, they are treated with sulfuric acid, soap, water and steel wool.

Most of the work is the making casseroles, pots, plates, jars, vases, ashtrays, bells, mugs, stills, braziers and hearths. Some jewelry is made but it is not the main focus. Almost all of the objects are hammered into shape from a single piece or block of copper, including details like handles and decorative figures which are shaped along with the main body. This eliminates the need for soldering.

== Noted copper artisans ==
The Punzo Ángel family are well known in Santa Clara del Cobre for their copper work. Two of the most active smiths in the family, Abdón and Ignacio maintain large active workshops and have trained their children in the techniques that they have learned from their father. They create mostly large pieces with innovative designs with are often detailed. They also work in silver. Both have received a large number of acknowledgements and awards for their work.

Jesús Pérez Ornelas is considered to be the master of engraving and sgraffito in copper because of his designs and the quality of the finishes. He has worked abroad and spends much of his time teaching his techniques of hammering copper. His works are generally covered with engraved designs which include frets, animals, rhombus shapes, flowers and more.

== Feria del Cobre ==
The first Feria del Cobre was held in Santa Clara in 1946 held in August to coincide with the feast day of the patron saint of Saint Claire . The Feria del Cobre exhibits hundreds of pieces of hammered copper from about 250 artisans, demonstrations of copper working techniques and more. The main event is the Concurso Nacional de Cobre Martilado (National Hammered Copper Contest). The contest has four categories: Maestros (Masters), Jóvenes (Youth), Nuevos talentos (New talents) and Infantiles (Children) with over 84 prizes. The event drew over 6,000 people in 2010. The fair has been held each year since 1965.

== Bibliography ==
- Herrera Cabañas, Arturo (1981). Santa Clara del Cobre, Michoacán Mexico (in Spanish). Mexico: Arturo Compañía Minera de Cananea, S.A.
- Horcasitas de Barro, María Luisa (1973). La Artesanía de Santa Clara del Cobre [The Handcrafts of Santa Clara del Cobre] (in Spanish). Mexico Mexico City: Secretaría de Educación.
- Fernández de Calderón, Cándida, ed. (2003). Great Masters of Mexican Folk Art: From the collection of Fomento Cultural Banamex. Mexico City: Fomento Cultural Banamex, A.C. ISBN 968-5234-09-4.
