= Santa Clara del Cobre =

- Town and Municipality
- Salvador Escalante
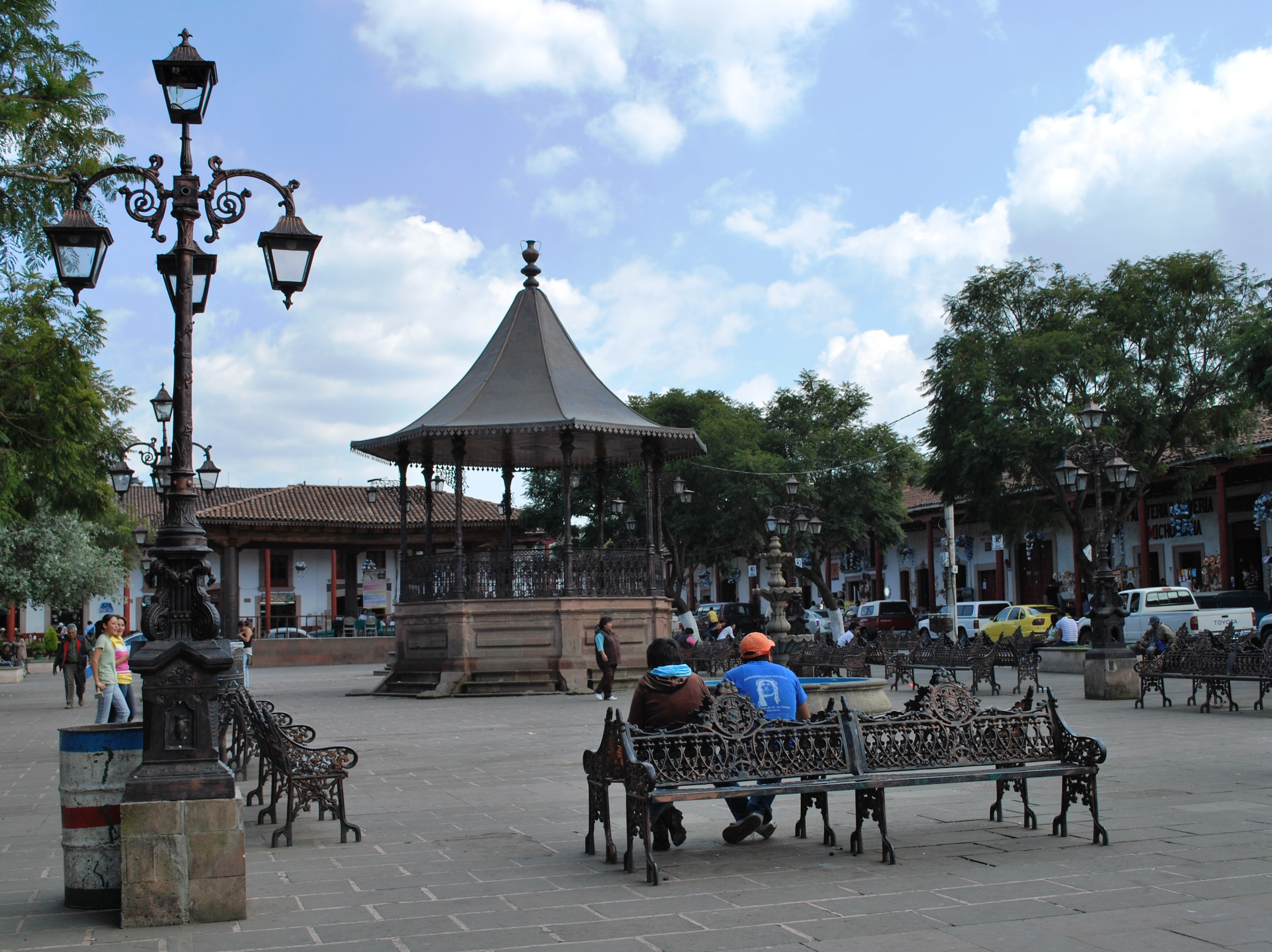
- Plaza of Santa Clara del Cobre

- Location in Mexico Santa Clara del Cobre (Mexico)
- Coordinates: 19°24′19″N 101°38′18″W
- Country: Mexico
- State: Michoacán
- Founded: 1521

Government
  - Municipal President: Arturo Ramírez Puerco

Area
  - Municipality: 487.98 km^{2} (188.41 sq mi)
- Elevation (of seat): 2,200 m (7,200 ft)

Population (2005) Municipality
  - Municipality: 38,502
  - Seat: 13,069
- Time zone: UTC-6 (Central (US Central))

Santa Clara del Cobre (Spanish: [ˈsanta ˈklaɾa ðel ˈkoβɾe]) is a Magical town (Pueblo Mágico) and municipality located in the center of the state of Michoacán, Mexico, 18 km from Pátzcuaro and 79 km from the state capital of Morelia. While the official name of the municipality is Salvador Escalante, and the town is often marked as "Villa Escalante" or "Salvador Escalante" on maps, both entities are interchangeably called Santa Clara del Cobre. The town is part of the Pátzcuaro region of Michoacán, and ethnically dominated by the Purépecha people. These people have been working with copper since the pre-Hispanic era, and led to this town's dominance in copper crafts over the colonial period (1519–1821) until well into the 19th century. Economic reverses led to the industry's near-demise here until efforts in the 1940s and 1970s managed to bring the town's work back into prominence.

Santa Clara del Cobre was named a "Pueblo Mágico" in 2010.

== History ==
This area, like the rest of the Lake Pátzcuaro region, was settled by the Purépecha people starting from the 12th century. In this area, the Purépecha founded villages such as Churucumeo, Cuirindicho, Andicua, Huitzila, Taboreca and Itziparátzico with the village closest to the modern town of Santa Clara del Cobre being Xacuaro. Of Mesoamerican cultures, only the Purépecha and the Zapotec peoples in Oaxaca were able to extensively use copper. This metal was rare among the Aztecs. The Purépecha were the most advanced in metallurgy, with the ability to fashion bells, decorations, jewelry and tools such as axes. They also knew how to inlay gold into copper objects. Burial grounds here have yielded copper items such as axes, masks and pincers. Part of the reason for this is that the area contained mines such as Inguarán and Opopeo which were known for abundance and which attracted the Spanish when they arrived.

At the beginning of the Conquest, most natives here fled the Spaniards, but were later enticed to return by the Spanish to continue their former trades. One of the incentives that Vasco de Quiroga gave the natives of the Santa Clara area was the exclusive right to produce “cazos” a cross between a large caldron and a very large wok. These are still used today in Mexico, often to render fat or to fry pig skin into chicharrones. He also introduced new methods of smelting and working copper. Evangelization of the area was led by Friar Francisco Villafuerte, and the town was founded as Santa Clara de Acuero by Friar Martín de Jesús in 1521.

In 1540, a large forge was built here to smelt copper, which was not from local sources but rather from mines miles away. Smelting was done here because the process required three times the charcoal as ore, and the surrounding forests provided the charcoal. The town was officially founded in 1553, with the name Santa Clara de los Cobres. Santa Clara became the most important copper smelting area in New Spain, meeting the demand for cauldrons, stills, casks, church bells and sending copper to the mint for coinage. In 1765, the town of Santa Clara de los Cobres incorporated two Indian settlements called Santa María Opopeo, and Santiago de Ario. Miguel Hidalgo y Costilla was a sacristan of the parish church in 1788. The settlement was officially named a town in 1858 and called Santa Clara de Portugal in honor of Cayetano de Portugal.

Copper production peaked in the second half of the 19th century. At this time a huge fire destroyed the town and it remained impoverished from the end of the 19th century into the early 20th. It burned again in 1910, with the Spanish population abandoning the town for nearby Pátzcuaro and Morelia, leaving only the indigenous. The municipality was the scene of the first uprising in support of Francisco I. Madero, led by Salvador Escalante. However, the town had so degraded economically that its coppersmithing tradition was ignored by Dr. Atl in his 1921 classic work The Popular Arts of Mexico. In 1932, the town's name was changed to Villa Escalante and the municipality's name was changed to Salvador Escalante but neither name was ever used popularly. In 1946, a group of local artisans decided to organize a copper fair, which continues to this day. The copper industry was revived here making decorated jugs, vases, centerpieces and other items. However, the nearest copper mines were tapped out in the mid 20th century. Today, the 10,000 tons of copper that comes into Santa Clara each week arrives in the form of recycled copper wire and cable from electric and telephone companies in Mexico and abroad. In 1981, the town changed its name back to Santa Clara del Cobre but kept Salvador Escalante as the official name of the municipality.

== The town ==
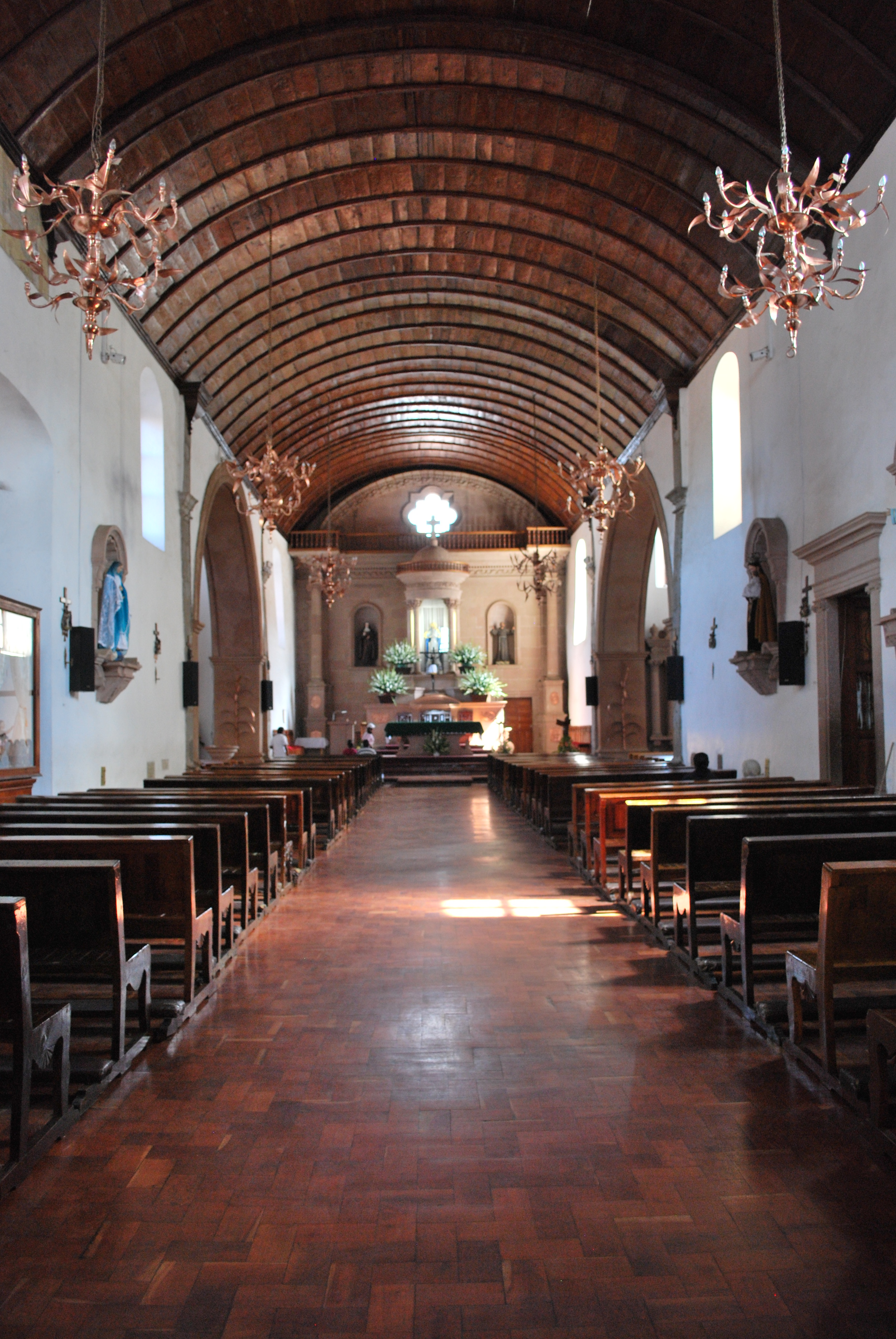
Parish church with copper chandeliers and wall decorations

The town has mostly conserved its colonial look, with houses and other buildings mostly painted white and roofed in red tiles. Older buildings have thick adobe walls. Many of the houses here have decorations such as bells, flowerpots, doorknockers, etc. made of copper.

The center of town is made of two plazas. One contains a kiosk with a copper roof, as well as benches and garbage cans painted to look like copper. Facing this plaza are many shops selling copper wares. Next to these is a plain plaza onto which face the town's two main churches, the Parish of Santa Clara and the Chapel del Hospital. Just off the kiosk plaza is the Museo del Cobre (Copper Museum). The museum holds a collection of hand-hammered copper items from the pre-Hispanic period to the winners of the town's annual copper festival each year to the present, as well as national and international competitions. One section contains workshops in which classes are given and it is also home to the Unión de Artesanos (Artisans’ Union) which accredits smiths and products in order to conserve and further develop the craft.

== Coppersmithing of Santa Clara del Cobre ==
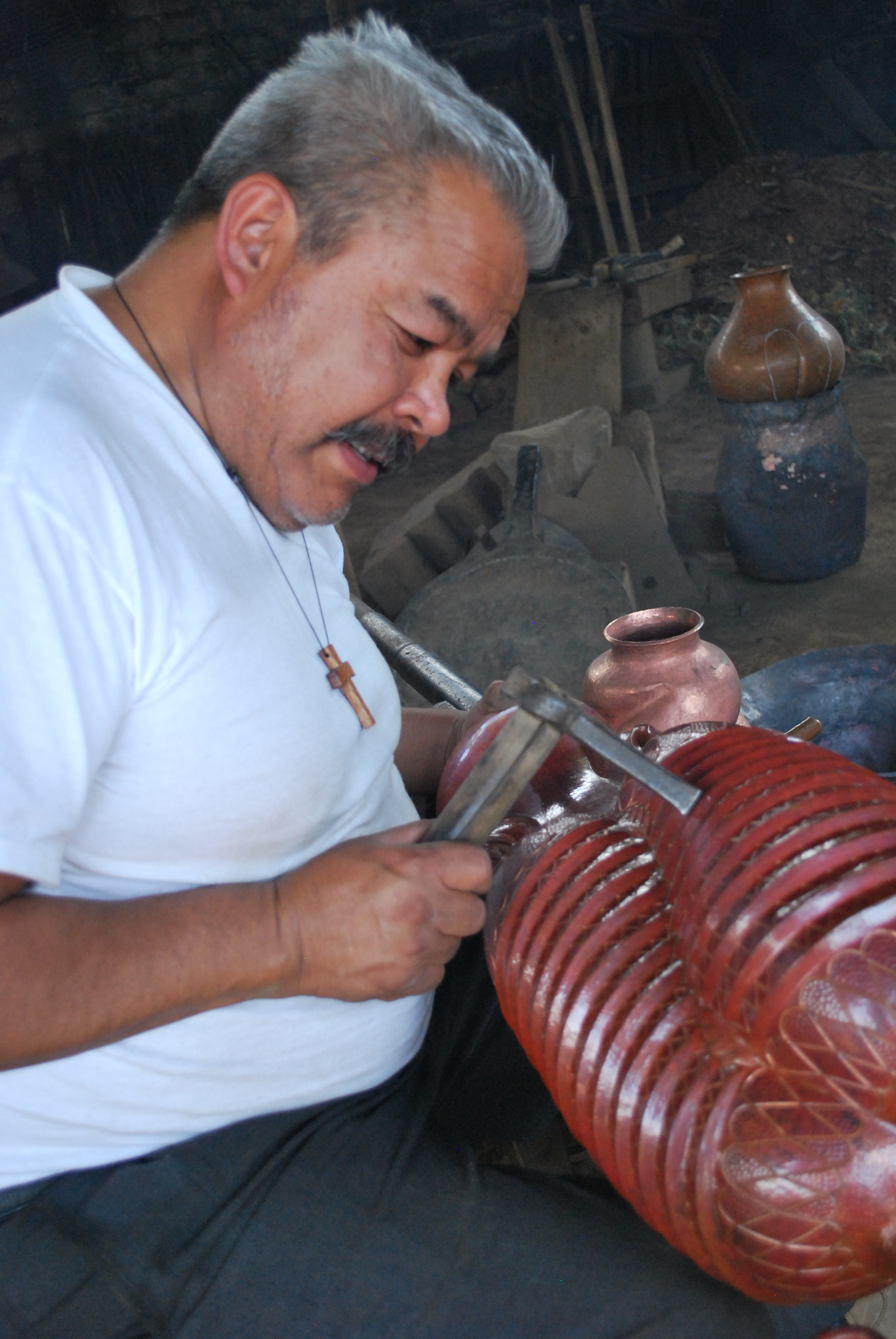
Coppersmith Abdón Punzo in his workshop in Santa Clara

Copper has been worked in this area since pre-Hispanic times, with the native Purépecha being the most advanced smiths of that time. Although the Spanish introduced new techniques, one native one that was kept was that of smelting, as it was more efficient than European techniques. For this reason, bellows seen here are very different from Europe.

Most of the town's population, 82%, is employed in the making of copper items. There are 250 registered workshops in and around the town, which process about 450 tons of copper each year. This generates an income of about fifty million pesos a year. Many of the copper items made are of a utilitarian nature – cooking utensils, various types of containers, pots, pans, plates, shot glasses, clocks, jewelry, vases, beds, tables, chairs, light switches, counters, sinks, even bathtubs, and much, much more, all in copper. However, since the 1970s copper jewelry, and many other non-essential items has also been made here. The workshops here are family-owned with children learning the trade from their parents. There is also a cooperative school-workshop to teach coppersmithing, named Vasco de Quiroga.

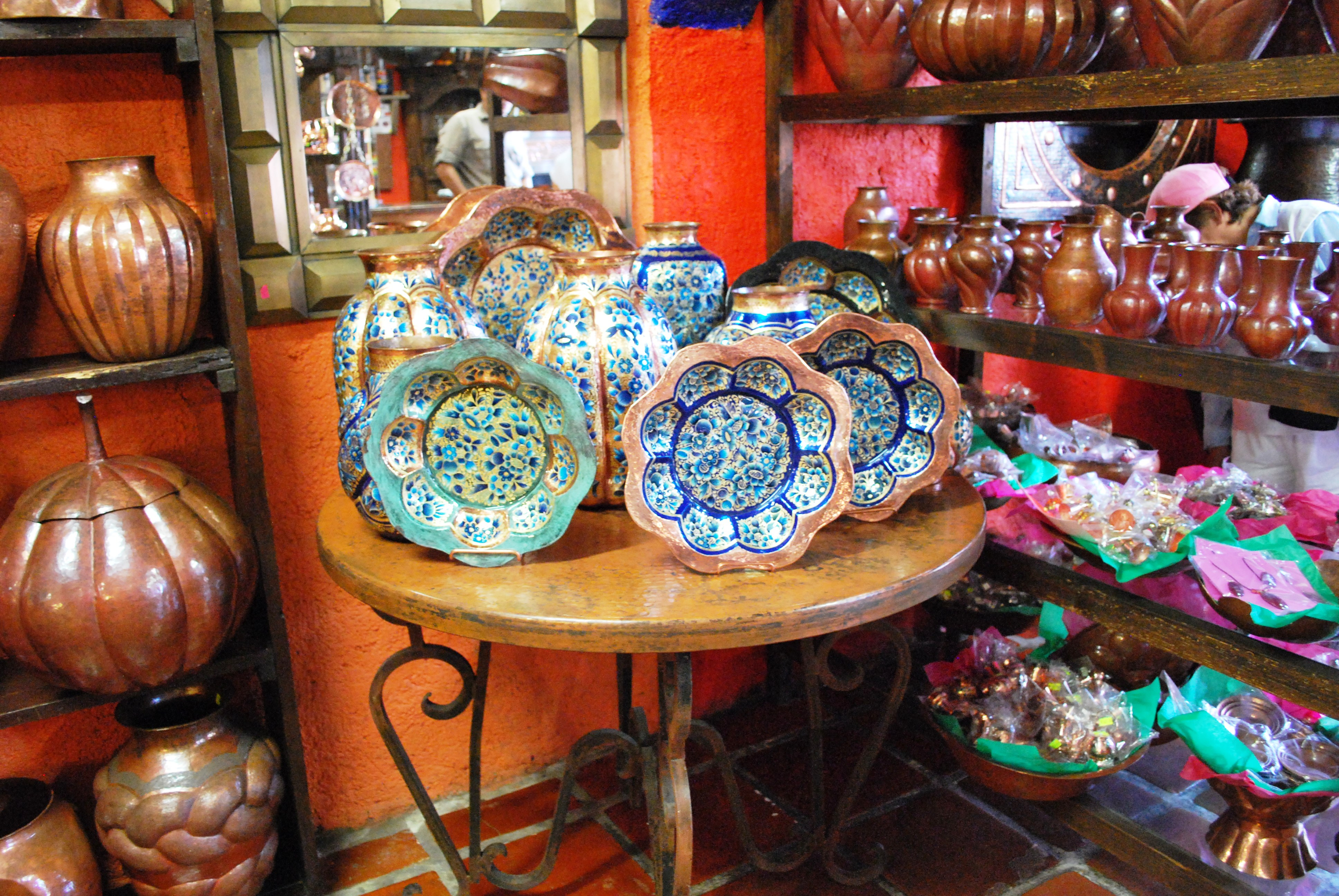
Painted and burnished copper items for sale

Items take from four days to a month to complete, depending on the size, thickness and decorative features. One example is the copper roof of the town's kiosk which is located in one of the main plazas. The making of a piece in a workshop usually require four people to heat the metal, turn it and hammer it into shape. Pieces from this town have been collected by museums in various parts of the world as well as private Mexican and international collectors. This has led to growing exports of items made from this community. To further promote Santa Clara del Cobre's work, expositions such as one called “Santa Clara del Cobre. Obras Maestras” (Santa Clara del Cobre Masterpieces) have been held. This particular exposition featured more than 200 works done in copper, as well as covered the history of copper work in the town.

A major force in the development of Santa Clara del Cobre's work since the 1970s has been the efforts of American James Metcalf and his wife, Mexican Ana Pellicer. Both had been internationally recognized artists prior to settling in Santa Clara del Cobre. Metcalf was commissioned to create the Olympic torch for the 1968 Olympic Games and Pellicer designed the jewelry that adorned the Statue of Liberty on its 100th anniversary. The two established a studio in the town, bringing new approaches to working copper. They founded the Casa de Artesana in 1972, which emphasized the collective aspects of the old artisans’ guild. Giant public pieces were produced, from murals to bas-reliefs, which now adorn places like the Acapulco Convention Center and the Institute for Foreign Trade in Mexico City. These pieces succeeded in bring widespread attention to the copper smithing craft of this town. Until this time, women were not involved in making copper items due to the upper body strength needed to hammer large items. Pellicer introduced copper jewelry-making, with women now making gossamer chains and small beads. The couple introduced the integration of new technologies such as lathes, levelers, electric motors, linseed finishes, computer designs and others melded with traditional indigenous designs.

With government support, Metcalf and Pellicer founded a school of arts and crafts in 1976 in the town, undertaking instruction in new techniques, development of new tools, and cultural, technical and artistic studies. As the school grew, so too did the participation of the Mexican government, and the school became known as the Adolfo Best Maugard Center for Creative Technical and Industrial Training (CECATI No. 166), now teaching its third generation of students from all parts of Mexico. There are also satellite campuses in Guanajuato, Oaxaca and Chiapas.

== Feria del Cobre ==
The Feria Nacional y Concurso del Cobre Martillado (National Festival and Competition of Hammered Copper) takes place in late August and/or early September, around the feast day of the town's patron saint, Saint Clare (Santa Clara). This is one of the events that has earned the state of Michoacán its reputation as a fine crafts producer. Its main feature is a copper crafts competition which awards more than eighty prizes with a combined purse of about 400,000 pesos. The festival opens with speeches by politicians and a parade. The parade with floats, with themes related to copper and the area, including agriculture. Other attractions include musical groups, dances, singing contests, athletic events, classic car shows fireworks and food tasting. Local food specialties include sopa rellena, tostadas de carne Apache, corundas and atole. A queen of the festival is also crowned each year.

== The municipality ==
As a municipality, the community of Santa Clara del Cobre is the governing authority for 116 named communities. About one third of the municipality's total population of 38,502 lives in the town of Santa Clara del Cobre proper. The municipality is located in the center of Michoacán, bordered by the municipalities of Pátzcuaro, Huiramba, Tacámbaro, Ario de Rosales, Zirahuén, Taretan and Tingambato, with a territory of 487.98 km^{2} (188.41 sq mi). It lies on the Trans-Mexican Volcanic Belt contains the Santa Clara mountains, and the mountains of San Miguel, El Zurapio Pelón, San Lorenzo and El Guayamel as notable peaks. The main rivers are Silencio and Manzanillos, with streams such as the Turitán and Agua Blanca, Lake Zirahuén and fresh water springs comprising the rest of the surface water. The municipality has a temperate climate with a rainy season in the summer, with a few areas low enough to be considered tropical. Most of the vegetation is mixed pine and oak forest with tropical foliage in the lowest lying areas. Animal life consists of small mammals such as opossums, foxes, rabbits with fish such as trout in the rivers and Lake Zirahuén. This lake is a deep blue color and surrounded by forests of mostly pine trees. The area has hiking paths, mountain biking, horseback riding and fishing and camping. The landscapes of the municipality were featured in the novel “La vida inútil de Pito Pérez” by José Rubén Romero.

Copper smithing is the most important economic activity, especially in the municipal seat, but agriculture occupies most of the land. Crops grown include corn, potatoes, wheat, beans, blackberries and barley. Livestock includes cattle, pigs, sheep, horses and mules. Other industries here include food processing and wood working, especially furniture-making. Tourism is attracted through the coppersmithing, the annual copper festival, forests and Lake Zirahuén. Other crafts are practiced in communities outside the municipal seat. Objects such as chairs, rag dolls, wood items and other things are made by communities such as Opopeo and Casas Blancas. Many of these artisans receive government support through the Fondo Nacional para el Fomento de las Artesanías.
