= Villa Hidalgo Municipality, Oaxaca =

Villa Hidalgo Municipality
- Municipality
- Location in Mexico
- Coordinates: 17°10′52″N 96°10′08″W
- Country: Mexico
- State: Oaxaca
- Municipal seat: Hidalgo Yalalag

Population (2020)
  - Total: 1,885
- Time zone: UTC-6 (Central Standard Time)

Villa Hidalgo Municipality is a municipality in Oaxaca in south-western Mexico. It is part of the Villa Alta District in the center of the Sierra Norte Region. Its municipal seat is Hidalgo Yalalag, which is located 104 km (65 mi) from Oaxaca City.

As of 2020, the municipality had a population of 1,885.
