= Hidalgo Yalalag =

- Village
- Location in Mexico
- Coordinates: 17°11′N 96°11′W
- Country: Mexico
- State: Oaxaca
- Municipality: Villa Hidalgo

Population (2020)
  - Total: 1,752
- Time zone: UTC-6 (CST)

Villa Hidalgo Yalalag (also, Yalalag, Hidalgo Yalag, and Villa Hidalgo Yalalag, and San Juan Yalalag) is a village in Oaxaca, Mexico and the municipal seat of Villa Hidalgo Municipality. It is located near Villa Alta District in the center of the Sierra Norte Region.

The town is divided into four neighborhoods (in Spanish called "barrios"). These 4 barrios are: San Juan, Santiago, Santa Catalina, and Santa Rosa.

== Culture ==
On August 30 and July 24, in honor of San Juan Bautista, the townspeople of Villa Hidalgo Yalalag celebrate their annual festival, with popular dancing, processions, and offerings. The Yalalag cross is a locally designed piece of jewellery.

=== Traditions ===
Traditions include Semana Santa and Todos los Santos.

=== Music ===
Popular bands in Villa Hidalgo Yalalag are "Banda Uken ke Uken" and "Los Ratones."

=== In art ===
Mexican photographer Lola Álvarez Bravo's photograph Burial in Yalalag (1946) was included in the 1955 Museum of Modern Art exhibition Family of Man, which toured internationally during the 1950s and 1960s, with her image reaching millions of viewers.

== See also ==
- Yalálag Zapotec
