= Luis Spota =

Mexican writer (1925–1985)

Luis Mario Cayetano Spota Saavedra Ruotti Castañares
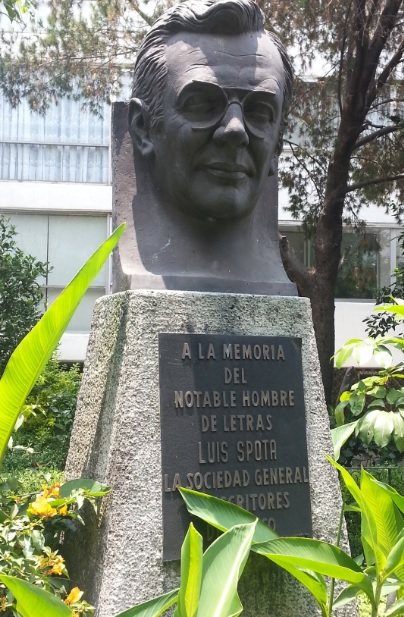
- Bust of Spota in Mexico City.
- Born: July 13, 1925; Mexico City
- Died: January 20, 1985 (aged 59)
- Occupations: Writer, Journalist, Boxing official

Luis Mario Cayetano Spota Saavedra Ruotti Castañares (13 July 1925, Mexico City — 20 January 1985) was a Mexican writer, journalist, boxing official and film director.

Although he never finished primary school, Spota became a highly successful author and journalist in his lifetime, appearing frequently on TV and radio. He was also a busy screenwriter for the Mexican film industry. He was a close friend of the Mexican president Miguel Aleman Valdes.

He was the first president of the World Boxing Council (WBC) (February 1963 - September 1968).

He died of pancreatic cancer in Mexico City.

== Early life ==
He was the son of an Italian father and Mexican mother and ran away from home when he was 11. He wrote his first book, Los Metaleros, at age 13. He began as a staff reporter at the Mexico City newspaper Novedades de México, where he later became a columnist.

== Bibliography ==
He wrote more than 30 books, many of which were translated abroad. Several of his books are available in English:

- Más cornadas da el hambre (1949) was translated by Barnaby Conrad and published by Penguin UK in 1961. This novel, dealing with bull-fighting, won the Premio Ciudad de México and was turned into the film Wounds of Hunger (1963) by director George Sherman and starred Tony Anthony, Luciana Paluzzi, Eleonora Rossi Drago and Mark Damon (who also co-produced).
- La sangre enemiga (1959) was also published by Penguin under the title The enemy blood (translator: Robert Molloy). The movie version was directed by Rogelio A. González.
- Other titles include El tiempo de la ira, also translated by Robert Molloy as The Time of Wrath, and Casi el paraíso, translated by Ray Morrison and Renate Morrison as Almost Paradise.

== Filmography ==
Other films based on his work include Roberto Gavaldón's acclaimed drama En La Palma de Tu Mano (In the Palm of Your Hand), which won all the top Ariel Awards of 1951; The Empty Star (La estrella vacía), directed by Emilio Gómez Muriel and starring María Félix in 1960; Ismael Rodríguez's The Paper Man (El hombre de papel, 1963) with a performance by Ignacio López Tarso that won him the Golden Gate Award for Best Actor at the San Francisco International Film Festival; and Arturo Ripstein's Cadena perpetua (1979).

Spota also directed several action films and the anthology film Amor en cuatro tiempos (Love in Four Times, 1955), starring Arturo de Córdova, Marga López, Jorge Mistral, Silvia Pinal and Ariadne Welter.

== Boxing and lucha libre ==
He was president of Mexico Boxing and Lucha libre Commission from 1959 until the day of his death in 1985.

He was the first President of the World Boxing Council (WBC) from February 1963 until September 1968.
