= List of awards and nominations received by María Félix =

María Félix awards and nominations
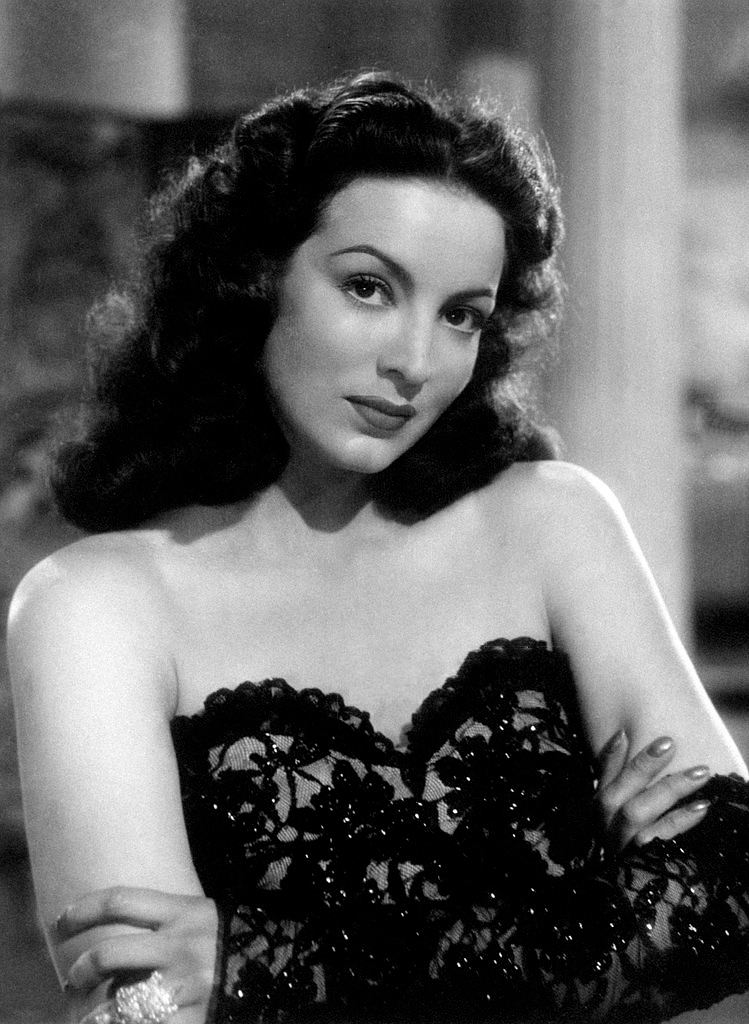
- María Félix in The Kneeling Goddess (1947)
Awards and nominations
Award	Wins	Nominations
Ariel Awards	4	5
Association of Latin Entertainment Critics	1	1
Diosas de Plata	4	4

Totals (Note: Certain award groups do not simply award one winner. They acknowledge several different recipients, have runners-up, and have third place. Since this is a specific recognition and is different from losing an award, runner-up mentions are considered wins in this award tally. For simplification and to avoid errors, each award in this list has been presumed to have had a prior nomination.)
- Wins: 28
- Nominations: 30

Mexican actress María Félix (1914–2002) was one of the main figures of the Golden Age of Mexican Cinema. She is the recipient of a number of national and international awards.

As an actress, she won three trophies from five nominations on the Ariel Awards, and an additional Gold Ariel for her career in 1986. She was also the recipient of various accolades from Diosa de Plata Awards by the Mexican Film Journalists Association (PECIME). Her actoral career was also recognized by the National Association of Actors (ANDA), Association of Latin Entertainment Critics (Latin ACE), and by the Cinematheque of the National Autonomous University of Mexico. In addition, a Diosa de Plata for Best Actress was named after her since 2002, and she became part of their Golden Book (Libro de Oro). María also received tributes in a number of festivals.

Outside of her work in cinema, she won accolades for her fashion and image. She was named Best Dressed Woman of 1984 by the Fédération de la Haute Couture et de la Mode and Camera Nazionale della Moda Italiana. During the 1970s, she won various equestrian awards, including Grand Steeple-Chase de Paris, Jockey Club's Grand French and Irish Derby, and the Prix Round Point. She was also condecorated by the French government in 1996 with the Ordre des Arts et des Lettres and Legion of Honour in 2000, and by then president of México Carlos Salinas de Gortari in 1989 with the first Mexico City Prize (Presea de la Ciudad de México).

== Awards and nominations ==
Award/organization	Year	Nominee/work	Category	Result	Ref.
Ariel Award	1946	María Félix (The White Monk)	Best Actress	Nominated	
Ariel Award	1947	María Félix (Enamorada)	Best Actress	Won	
Ariel Award	1949	María Félix (Río Escondido)	Best Actress	Won	
Ariel Award	1951	María Félix (The Devil Is a Woman)	Best Actress	Won	
Ariel Award	1955	María Félix (Camelia)	Best Actress	Nominated	
Ariel Award	1986	María Félix	Gold Ariel	Honoree	
Association of Latin Entertainment Critics (Latin ACE)	1980	María Félix	Extraordinary ACE for Distinction and Merit	Honoree	
Camera Nazionale della Moda Italiana	1984	María Félix	World's Best Dressed Woman	Won	
Diosa de Plata (Mexican Film Journalists Association)	1970	María Félix	Sarape de Plata (Silver Serape)	Honoree	
Diosa de Plata (Mexican Film Journalists Association)	1970	María Félix	Gold Medal	Gold	
Diosa de Plata (Mexican Film Journalists Association)	1970	María Félix	Silver Diploma	Silver	
Diosa de Plata (Mexican Film Journalists Association)	1986	María Félix	Career Achievement Award	Honoree	
Fédération de la Haute Couture et de la Mode	1984	María Félix	Best Dressed Woman	Won	
Festival Cinematográfico del Centro Deportivo Israelita	1960	María Félix (La Cucharacha)	Gold Menorah Award	Gold	
Festival de Cine del Mediterráneo de Valencia	1994	María Félix	Special Recognition	Honoree	
Fiestas de la Primavera	1947	María Félix	Reina de la Primavera (Spring Queen)	Honoree	
Grand Steeple-Chase de Paris	1973	María Félix	Grand Prix	Won	
Los Angeles Latino International Film Festival	2000	María Félix	Gabi Award: Trayectory	Honoree	
National Association of Actors (ANDA)	1982	María Félix	Medal for Artistic Merits Abroad	Honoree	
National Autonomous University of Mexico	1992	María Félix	Film Library Medal	Honoree	
Paseo de las Estrellas (Durango, Mexico)		María Félix	Walk of Fame	Won	
Plaza de las Estrellas	1996	María Félix	Walk of Fame	Won	
Producción Nacional Cinematográfica (Spain)	1950	María Félix (Just Any Woman)	Contest: 4th Place	Won	
Premio Vittorio De Sica (Italy)	1992	María Félix	Career Award	Honoree	
René Cassin's Universal Excellence Award		María Félix	Arts	Honoree	

== Other honors ==
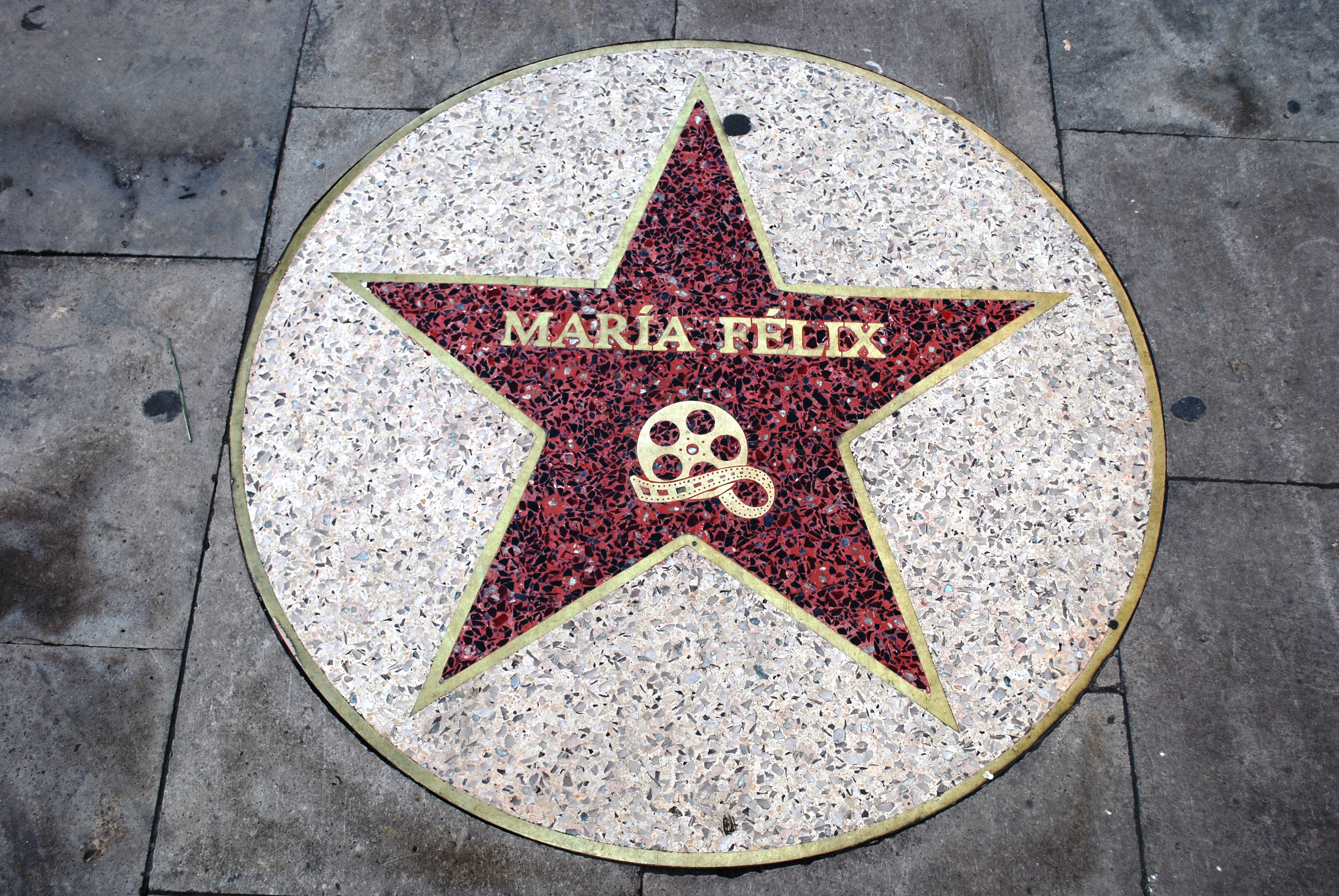
Maria Felix's star on the Paseo de las Estrellas, in Victoria (Durango), Mexico

Country	Year	Honor	Result	Ref.
Cuba	1946	Keys to the city, La Habana	Honoree	
Cuba	1946	Guest of Honor	Honoree	
Mexico	1989	Mexico City Prize (from Mexican president, Carlos Salinas de Gortari)	Honoree	
France	1996	Commandeur Ordre des Arts et des Lettres	Honoree	
France	2000	Officer Legion of Honour	Honoree	
