= Gavaldón =

Gavaldón is a surname. Notable people with the surname include:

- Angélica Gavaldón (born 1973), Mexican tennis player
- Roberto Gavaldón (1909–1986), Mexican film director
