= The Empty Star =

1958 film

- Directed by: Tito Davison; Emilio Gómez Muriel
- Written by: Luis Spota; Julio Alejandro; Emilio Gómez Muriel
- Produced by: Enrique Rosas Gallastegui
- Starring: María Félix; Ignacio López Tarso
- Cinematography: Gabriel Figueroa
- Edited by: Jorge Bustos
- Music by: Gustavo Cesar Carrión
- Distributed by: Producciones Corsa
- Release date: 5 May 1960 (Mexico)
- Running time: 107 minutes
- Country: Mexico
- Language: Spanish

The Empty Star (Spanish: La estrella vacía) is a 1960 Mexican drama film directed by Emilio Gómez Muriel starring María Félix and inspired by the novel of the same name by Luis Spota.

== Plot ==
Olga Lang (María Félix) is a young girl who dreams of stardom. Olga sacrifices everything for her career, even ending an inconvenient pregnancy after a love affair. When she is a massive star she realizes her life is unhappy and emotionally empty.

== Cast ==
- María Félix - Olga Lang
- Ignacio López Tarso - Luis Arvide
- Enrique Rambal - Rodrigo Lemus
- Tito Junco - Edmundo Sisler
- Ramón Gay - Raul
- Carlos Navarro - Rolando Vidal
- Rita Macedo - Teresa Mayen
- Wof Rubinskis - Tomas Tellez
- Carlos López Moctezuma
- Mauricio Garcés
