= El combate =

Mexican telenovela

- Genre: Telenovela
- Created by: Estela Calderón
- Directed by: Julio Castillo
- Starring: Ignacio López Tarso; Alicia Rodríguez
- Country of origin: Mexico
- Original language: Spanish
- No. of episodes: 20

Production
- Executive producer: Irene Sabido
- Cinematography: Carlos S. Zúñiga
- Running time: 30 minutes

Original release
- Network: Canal de las Estrellas
- Release: 1980

El combate (English title: The combat) is a Mexican telenovela produced by Irene Sabido for Televisa in 1980.

== Cast ==
- Ignacio López Tarso as Marcial
- Alicia Rodríguez as Rosario
- Alicia Palacios as Aurelia
- Pancho Córdova as Caritino
- Rosa Furman as Raquel
- Eugenia Avendaño as Generosa
- Graciela Orozco as Gudelia
- Laura Flores as Mariana
- Antonio Henaine as Ramon
- Adriana Laffan as Beatriz
- Tony Carbajal as Diego
- Alfredo Sevilla as Juan Manuel
- Lupita Sandoval as Lupita
- Rigoberto Carmona as Conrado
- Luciano Hernandez de la Vega as Don Severo
- Lupelena Goyeneche as Chagua
- Rosa Elena Diaz as Catalina
- Jaime Puga as Chema
- Rodrigo Puebla as Vicente
- Antonio Ruiz as José Luis
