= María Félix =

Mexican actress and singer (1914–2002)

María Félix Ordre des Arts et des Lettres
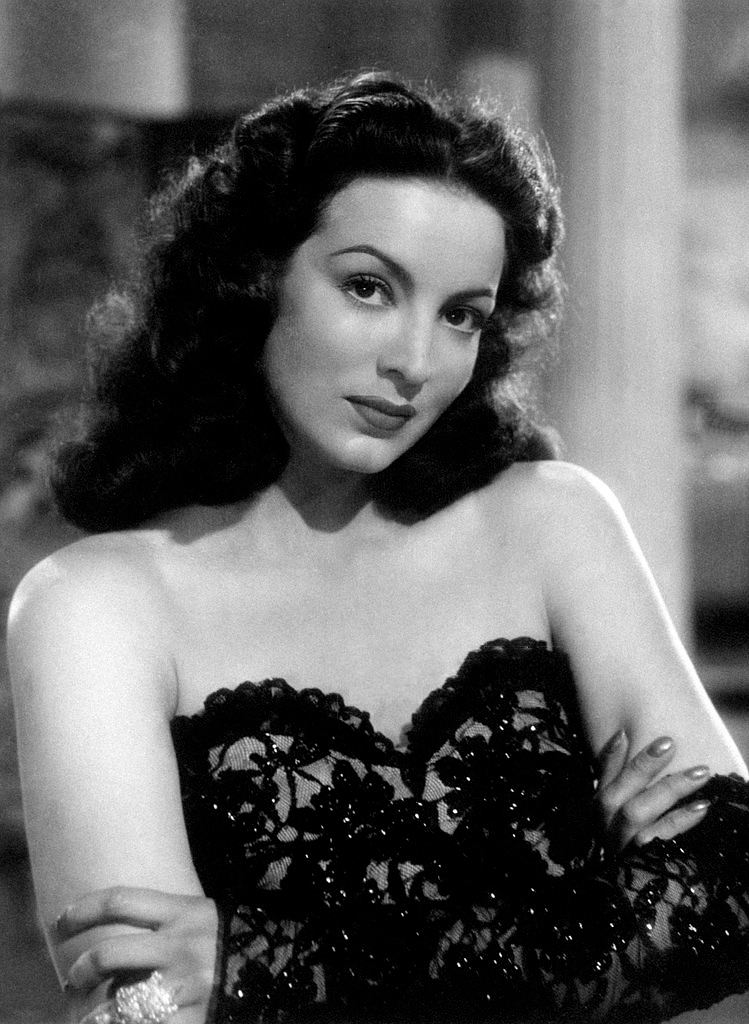
- Félix in The Kneeling Goddess (1947)
- Born: María de los Ángeles Félix Güereña; 8 April 1914; Álamos, Sonora, Mexico
- Died: 8 April 2002 (aged 88); Mexico City, Mexico
- Resting place: Panteón Francés located in Mexico City
- Other names: La Doña; María Bonita
- Occupations: Actress; Singer
- Years active: 1942–1978
- Spouses: Enrique Álvarez (m. 1931; div. 1938) Agustín Lara (m. 1945; div. 1947) Jorge Negrete (m. 1952; died 1953) Alex Berger (m. 1956; died 1974)
- Partner: Antoine Tzapoff (1980s)
- Children: Enrique Álvarez Félix
- Awards: Full list
- Website: mariafelix.com

María de los Ángeles Félix Güereña (Spanish: [maˈɾi.a ˈfeliɣs]; 8 April 1914 – 8 April 2002) was a Mexican actress and singer. Along with Pedro Armendáriz and Dolores del Río, she was one of the most successful figures of Latin American cinema in the 1940s and 1950s. Considered one of the most beautiful actresses of the Golden Age of Mexican cinema, her strong personality and taste for finesse garnered her the title of diva early in her career. She was known as La Doña, a name derived from her character in Doña Bárbara (1943), and María Bonita, thanks to the anthem composed exclusively for her as a wedding gift by her second husband, Agustín Lara. Her acting career consists of 47 films made in Mexico, Spain, France, Italy, and Argentina.

== Early life ==
María de los Ángeles Félix Güereña was born in Álamos, Sonora, Mexico, on 8 April 1914. Her birth was registered on May 4, which was later misreported as her date of birth.

She was the daughter of Bernardo Félix Flores, a military officer and politician who was of distant Yaqui descent, and Josefina Güereña Rosas, who grew up in the U.S. state of California; both were of Mexican ancestry. She had fifteen siblings: Josefina, María de la Paz, Pablo, Bernardo, Miguel, María de las Mercedes, Fernando, Victoria Eugenia, Ricardo, Benjamín and Ana María del Sacramento.

She spent her childhood in Álamos. During her childhood, she had a close relationship with her brother Pablo. Her mother separated the two siblings, thinking they might be involved in an incestuous relationship. For that reason, Pablo was sent to the Colegio Militar, in Mexico City.

Later, the Félix family moved to Guadalajara. When María was 17, her beauty soon began to attract attention. She was crowned Beauty Queen at the University of Guadalajara. It was at this time that she met Enrique Álvarez Alatorre, a salesman for the cosmetics firm Max Factor. After a brief romance, the couple married in 1931. In 1935, Félix gave birth to her only child, Enrique, nicknamed Quique. Her marriage with Álvarez was unsuccessful and the couple divorced in 1937. After her divorce, Félix returned to Guadalajara with her family, where she was the subject of gossip and rumors due to her status as a divorcée. Because of this situation, Félix decided to move to Mexico City with her son.

In Mexico City, she worked as a receptionist in a plastic surgeon's office, and lived in a guest house. One day, the father of her son visited the child, and deliberately refused to give the boy back to his mother. Álvarez took the child to Guadalajara. Félix's son was recovered with the help of Agustín Lara, her second husband. They planned an elaborate recovery that tricked the grandmother and took the child.

== Career ==
=== First years ===
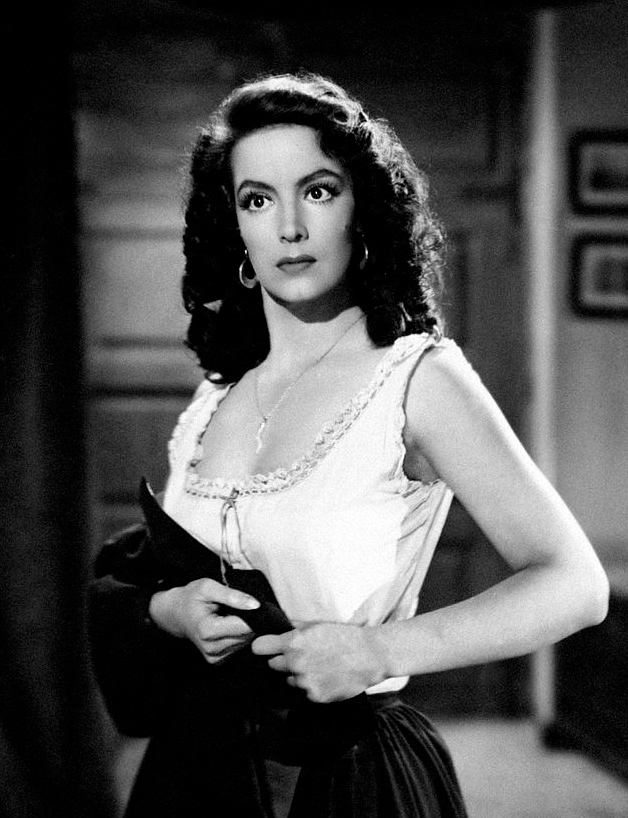
Félix in The Black Crown (1951)

One afternoon after work when walking down the street in Mexico City, director and filmmaker Fernando Palacios approached her asking if she wanted to make films. Her response was:

"When I want to, it will be through the big door."

Palacios finally persuaded her to break into films. Becoming her "Pygmalion", he began to train her and present her in film circles. She made her first appearance in the "White and Black Ballroom" of the Mexico City Country Club where some of the great Mexican film stars of the era (Esther Fernández, Lupe Vélez, Andrea Palma) gathered. Eventually she was taken to Hollywood, to the Metro-Goldwyn-Mayer Studios, where she met Cecil B. DeMille, who offered to launch her film career in Hollywood, but Félix was not interested. She preferred to begin her career in her own country. Finally, thanks to Palacios, she was offered the female lead role in a film by Grovas Productions: El Peñón de las Ánimas, directed by Miguel Zacarías.

In the film El Peñón de las Ánimas, Félix starred opposite the popular Mexican actor and singer Jorge Negrete. María Félix and Jorge Negrete got off to a bad relationship during the filming because he had asked that his girlfriend, the actress Gloria Marín, be given the lead role. For this reason, the shooting of the film was difficult and led to a direct confrontation between Félix and Negrete. That confrontation helped to cement the reputation of Félix as a tough and arrogant woman.

In her second film, María Eugenia, Félix would be projected in a role out of her temperamental film personality. However, the film is remembered as the only film where Félix appeared in swimwear. The same happened with the film La china poblana (1944), where Félix claimed to have paid a debt of gratitude to her discoverer Fernando Palacios, who directed the film. Nobody has heard from this film (the second color film of the Mexican cinema), so it is considered lost. She called both films "her beginner sins".

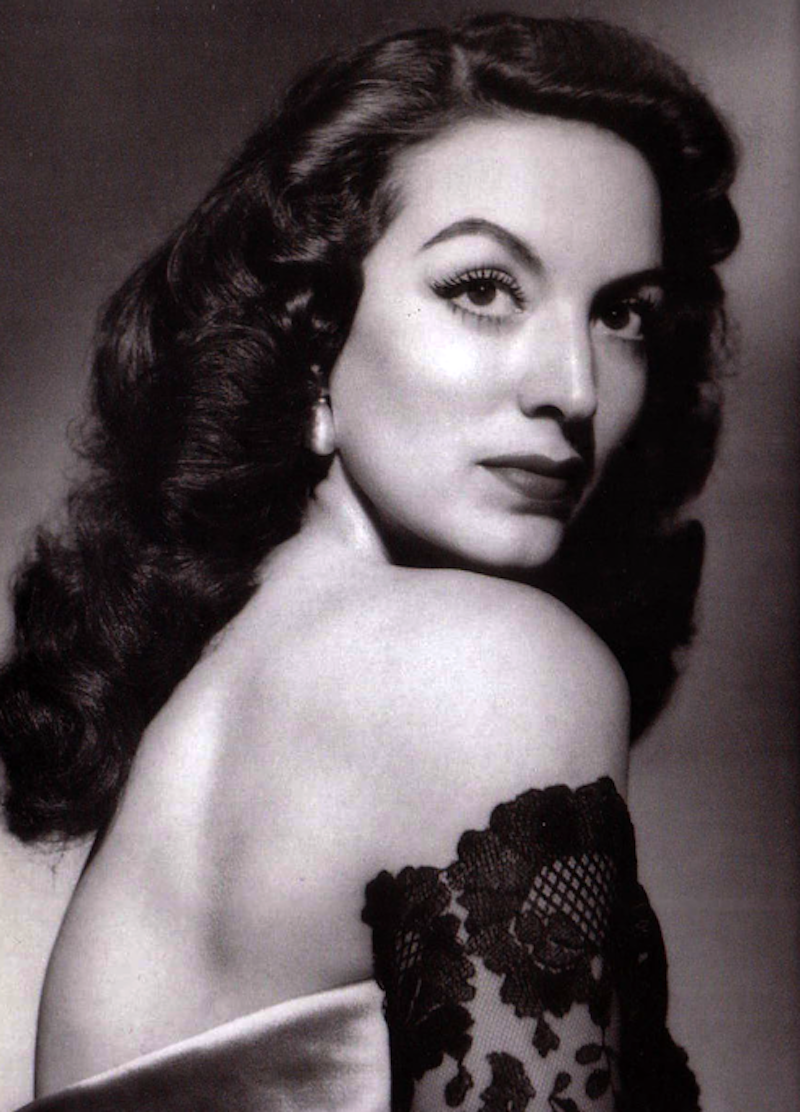
Felix

Félix was known as La Doña for her role in the film Doña Bárbara (1943), based on the novel by the Venezuelan writer Rómulo Gallegos. For the film, another actress (Isabela Corona) was already hired, but when Gallegos first saw Félix, he was charmed by her and said: "Here is my Doña Bárbara!" The film was filmed in Venezuela with Mexican and Venezuelan actors. Doña Bárbara was to be the start of her major collaborations with the Mexican film director Fernando de Fuentes. Félix and de Fuentes filmed together another two films: La Mujer sin Alma (1944) and La Devoradora (1946). As María Félix herself said, "With these films, I became the number one enemy of the Mexican family morals."

Somehow, I seduced the public, even those who criticize the conduct of my characters in the films. My legend began to take shape without moving a finger. The public imagination did everything for me.

Without her stereotyped role of a "femme fatale", María Félix filmed two sophisticated films: El monje blanco (1945), directed by Julio Bracho, and Vertigo (1946), directed by Antonio Momplet. Both characters required a great dramatic intensity.

Under the direction of Emilio Fernández, María Félix made three successful films: Enamorada (1946), Río Escondido (1947), and Maclovia (1948). The relationship between Félix and Fernández was cordial and smooth, despite the strong and famous temperament of the film director. In Enamorada, María Félix found her perfect film partner, the actor Pedro Armendáriz. The films of María Félix with Fernández and his team (writer Mauricio Magdaleno, photographer Gabriel Figueroa, and Armendáriz) had strong presence in several international film festivals. In turn, they gave María Félix her first Ariel Award for Enamorada and Río Escondido.

Between the films with Fernández, María Félix also worked with Roberto Gavaldón, another director who showcased some of her best performances. Their first collaboration was in La diosa arrodillada (1947) with Arturo de Córdova. Thanks to these films, María Félix's fame crossed the Atlantic.

In 1948 she was contracted by the Spanish film producer Cesáreo González. In this manner María Félix began her film adventure in Europe. She made only one more film in Mexico (Doña Diabla, 1949) until her return in 1952.

=== Europe ===
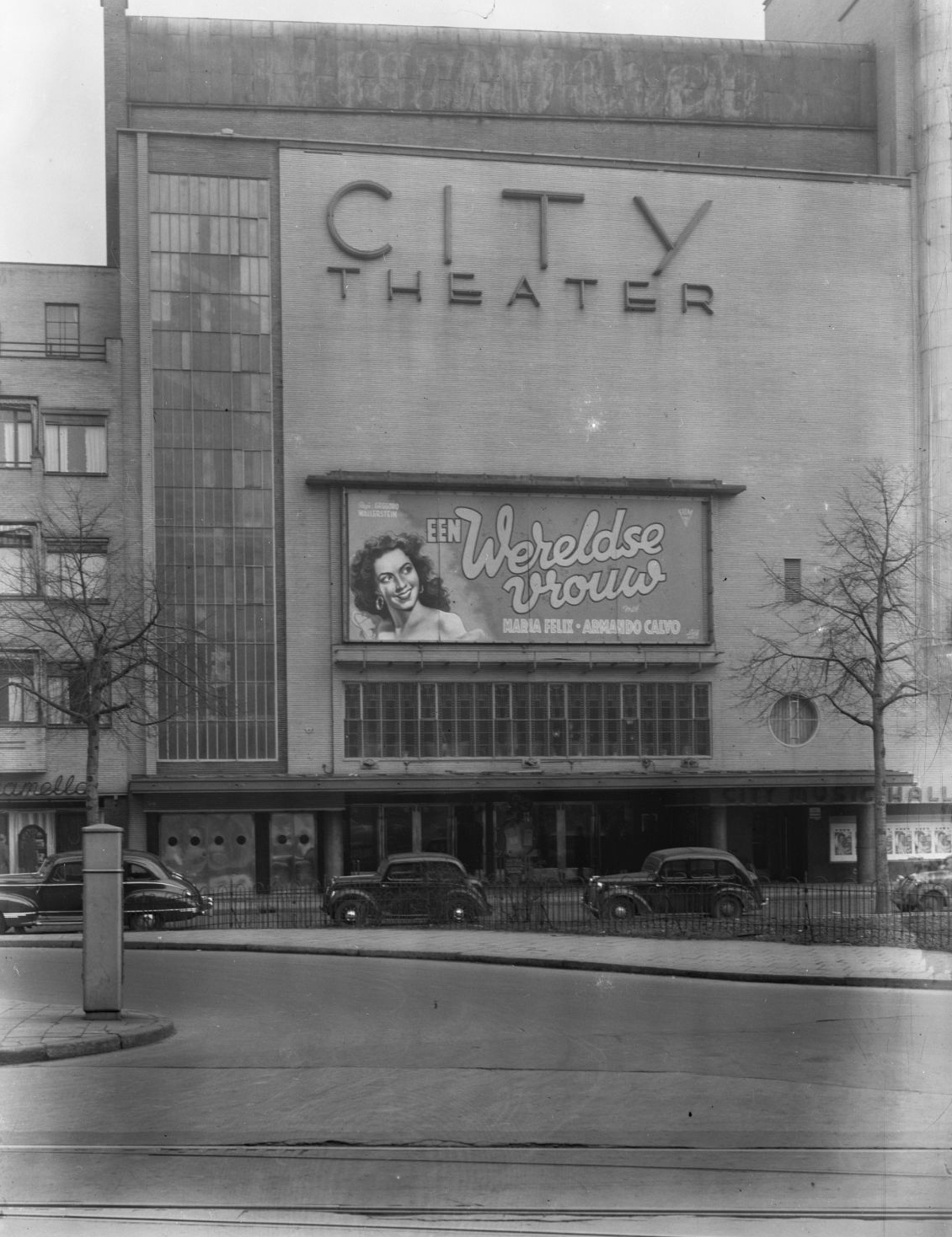
Marquee listing Félix's film, La mujer de todos, at Kleine-Gartmanplantsoen in Amsterdam at the City Theater in March 1948

Félix debuted in the European cinema in Spain, with the film Mare Nostrum (1948), directed by Rafael Gil. With Gil as director, she made another two films in 1950: Una mujer cualquiera and La noche del sábado. In 1951, she filmed the French-Spanish production La Couronne Noire directed by Luis Saslavsky based on a story by Jean Cocteau. She debuted in Italy with the film Incantesimo Tragico (1951). In the same year, she filmed Messalina (1951), directed by Carmine Gallone. During the shooting of the film, Félix suffered an emotional shock: her father died of a heart attack in Navojoa.

In 1952, Félix traveled to Argentina, where she filmed La pasión desnuda of the Argentine filmmaker Luis César Amadori. In the same year, Félix returned to Mexico. She concluded her working relationship with Cesáreo González with the film Camelia filmed in her native country. Her stay in Mexico was mainly based on her marriage to the actor and singer Jorge Negrete, her former film rival, with whom she filmed El rapto, directed by Emilio Fernández, Negrete's last film.

After Negrete's death on 5 December 1953, Félix returned to Europe. In France she made the films La Belle Otero (1954), and Les Héros sont Fatigués (1955), alongside Yves Montand. However, the most important film of Félix in this period was French Cancan (1954) directed by Jean Renoir with French actor Jean Gabin. Her last film shot entirely in Europe was the Spanish film Faustina.

=== Last films ===
Félix returned to Mexico in 1955. This period of her career was characterized by performing in period pieces inspired by the Mexican Revolution. This cycle begins with La Escondida (1955). In this film, as well as in stories like Canasta de cuentos mexicanos (1955) and Café Colón (1958), she worked again with Pedro Armendáriz. In 1956 she starred in Tizoc with the actor and singer Pedro Infante. However, the film was not liked by the actress, despite her international success. Eventually she filmed Beyond All Limits (1957) with Jack Palance, and the melodramas Ash Wednesday and The Empty Star (both 1958). In 1959 she played the title role in The Soldiers of Pancho Villa with top billing lead Dolores del Río. In 1959 she performed in the Spanish-Mexican co-production Sonatas directed by Juan Antonio Bardem and the French-Mexican co-production La Fièvre Monte à El Pao, directed by Luis Buñuel.

In the 1960s Félix's presence in the cinema was limited to only a few films. The most prominent were Juana Gallo (1960), La Bandida (1962), Amor y sexo (Sapho '63, 1963)), and La Valentina (1966). In 1970 she filmed La Generala, which would be her last film. The Mexican historical telenovela La Constitución (1971) would be her last professional acting job. Félix attempted to return to the cinema twice. First, in 1982, with the film Toña Machetes, and again in 1986 with the film Insólito resplandor. Neither project crystallized, and Félix never reappeared in film.

=== Roles declined in Hollywood ===
Almost from the beginning of her career, Félix received job offers in Hollywood, but Félix herself said: They only give me huehuenche (Indian) roles. While she was in France, Hollywood offered her the female role of Duel in the Sun, but she passed and the part went to Jennifer Jones. Another proposal was The Barefoot Contessa with Humphrey Bogart, but she refused it, instead making La Belle Otero in France. Ava Gardner ended up with the part. Later, the director Robert Aldrich sent her the script of The Legend of Lylah Clare, but she did not reach an agreement with the director and Kim Novak got the role.

== Personal life ==
Félix was married four times. Her first marriage (1931–1938) was with the cosmetics sales agent Enrique Álvarez Alatorre.

He fathered her only child, actor Enrique Álvarez Félix (1934–1996). According to journalist Sergio Almázon, once she found her son wearing a white dress and necklace. Infuriated, she beat him unconscious. Álvarez retaliated by taking their son to Guadalajara. Years later Félix was able to get her son back with the help of her second husband, Agustín Lara. Félix's relationship with her son was distant in his early years because she sent him to schools abroad "to discipline" him. Years later, Enrique returned to Mexico and started a career as an actor in film and television. Regarding her son, Félix said: "Enrique is a very gifted man, with admirable common sense. He's my best friend. I have so much fun with him. He's not a 'mama's boy' as many believe. Self-employed, fight like being independent. He has his own career, his audience, his poster and assumes his responsibilities without relying on me." The unexpected death of Enrique from a heart attack in 1996 affected Félix greatly.

There are conflicting rumors that, in between her marriages to Enrique Álvarez and Agustín Lara, Félix had a brief marriage to Raúl Prado, member of the Trío Calaveras, but no concrete evidence has emerged that the marriage ever took place. Most of the rumors agree in claiming that Prado and Félix allegedly got married in 1943 after meeting on the set of The Rock of Souls and separated two months after the wedding. Mexican writer Enrique Serna interviewed the last survivor of the trio, Miguel Bermego, who told him he was a witness to the wedding. Prado's niece María Escalera also corroborated the marriage, saying that the marriage ended when Agustín Lara sent Félix a white piano as a gift, and "Raúl threw her out — with the piano. They later divorced. So, it appears, María Félix was my tía política [aunt-in-law]." In his book about Félix María Félix: 47 pasos por el cine, Paco Ignacio Taibo I wrote about the marriage as factual, saying, "While shooting this film, María would meet Raúl Prado, a member of the Los Calaveras trio. After a quick courtship they got married and shortly after they divorced. This is one of the most carefully protected chapters of the star's life. María's friends keep claiming that it was crazy." Prado's obituary in the Spanish newspaper El País in April 1989 reported the marriage as factual, as did some obituaries of Félix's, such as the one in Argentine newspaper La Nación, the latter which only cited "a biography" as a source. It was cited by TVyNovelas as one of the "myths" surrounding Félix. It is known that Félix vehemently denied ever having married Prado. Serna, who also interviewed Félix, said "On our first meeting I asked her about her marriage to Raúl Prado (which she denied until the end), the member of the Calaveras trio who sang in Jorge Negrete's films, and she told me that if I was going to go on with those lies, we were not going to be able to work on the book." Serna added, "At one point she told me: 'Write what you want about me, because they believe anything about me. Say that I slept with an octopus.'"

Her second marriage (1945–1947) was to the composer Agustín Lara. Félix was a fan of Lara since her adolescence. They were formally introduced by a mutual friend, the actor Tito Novaro. The couple began a highly publicized relationship, which culminated in marriage in 1945. Lara immortalized Félix in a number of songs, such as "Humo en los ojos" ("Smoke in the eyes"), "Cuando vuelvas" ("When you come back"), "Dos puñales" ("Two daggers"), "Madrid" and especially the famous theme "María Bonita", composed in Acapulco during their honeymoon. "María Bonita" would become one of Lara's most popular songs. However, the relationship ended in 1947 due to Lara's jealousy. Félix said that Lara even tried to kill her in a fit of violent jealousy.

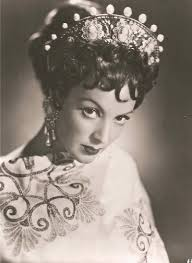
Félix in Messalina (1951)

After her second divorce, Félix had romances with some well-known men, such as Mexican aviation entrepreneur Jorge Pasquel, Spanish bullfighter Luis Miguel Dominguín, and Argentine actor Carlos Thompson. Félix met Thompson in Argentina in 1952 during the filming of Luis César Amadori's La pasión desnuda, and the relationship was reportedly serious to the point that they became engaged to be married, and Félix even called for her son Enrique Álvarez Félix to meet his potential stepfather. However, during filming, Félix received a call from director Emilio Fernández to offer her the leading role in The Rapture, which Félix accepted, telling Thompson that after filming of La pasión desnuda ended she would return to Mexico to promote the film and announce their future marriage. However, once in Mexico, Félix canceled the wedding days before it would take place, stating that she concluded that the only thing that united her to Thompson was a mere physical attraction and not true love.

During her stay in France, Félix was introduced by the painter Leonor Fini to French writer Jean Cau, assistant of the writer Jean Paul Sartre. Félix had a brief romance with Cau. From the end of 1950 to the spring of 1954, Félix also had a passionate same-sex affair with Suzanne Baulé, better-known as Frede, who at the time ran the cabaret Le Carroll's on Rue de Ponthieu in Paris, and the two women lived together at the Hotel George-V. The relationship was captured in a painting made by Fini of a plant with two flowers; one had the face of Félix and the other Frede's. Frede followed Félix on her filming trips to Buenos Aires and São Paulo upon learning of Félix's relationship with Carlos Thompson. Félix and Frede's relationship was interrupted by Félix's marriage to Jorge Negrete, but upon Negrete's death in 1953, Félix returned to Paris to briefly rekindle her relationship with Frede. However, they would violently break-up for good in 1954, leading to a trial in which Félix wanted to take back jewellery she had given to Frede and accused her of theft. Félix lost her lawsuit, and Frede was acquitted and kept the jewellery. Félix retained ownership of the painting Fini made of the two women, and after the break-up persuaded Fini to modify it to erase Frede's face, changing it to hers, resulting in the painting's two flowers both having Felix's face.

In 1953, when Félix returned to Mexico after her stay in Europe and Argentina, she was reunited with an "old enemy": the actor and singer Jorge Negrete. Unlike their difficult first meeting ten years ago on the set of El peñón de las ánimas, Félix found Negrete, in her own words: "surrendered to my feet". After a brief romance, the couple married in 1953, transmitted by radio to all Latin America, held at the House of Catipoato in Tlalpan. Negrete was already ill when the marriage took place, and died eleven months later at a hospital in Los Angeles, United States, while Félix was in Europe shooting La Belle Otero. Félix's appearance at his funeral, dressed in trousers, caused a huge scandal, which led her to take refuge in Europe.

Her fourth marriage (1956–1974), was with the Romanian-born French banker Alexander Berger. Félix met Berger in the 1940s, when they were both married. Years later they met again. Félix was married to Berger for 18 years. She tried becoming a mother again, but an accident during a filming in 1957 caused Félix to lose the child. It was at this time that she built her famous home, La Casa de las Tortugas (The House of Turtles), designed by Pepe Mendoza and resembling an Italian villa, in Cuernavaca. Berger died in 1974 of lung cancer months after the death of Félix's mother, which plunged her into a deep depression. To overcome this depression, she developed a new passion: horses. Some of her horses won major international equestrian awards. Félix kept horses for 11 years.

Her last romantic relationship was the Russian-French painter Antoine Tzapoff, who was 31 years her junior. About him, Félix said: I don't know if he's the man who has most loved me, but he's who has loved me better.

The press speculated about a strong rivalry between Félix and Dolores del Río, the other leading female figure of Mexican cinema and a successful Hollywood star. Regarding this "rivalry", Félix said: "With Dolores I had no rivalry. On the contrary, we were friends and always treated each other with great respect, each with our own personality. We were completely different. She was refined, interesting, gentle on the deal, and I'm energetic, arrogant and bossy."

== Influence ==
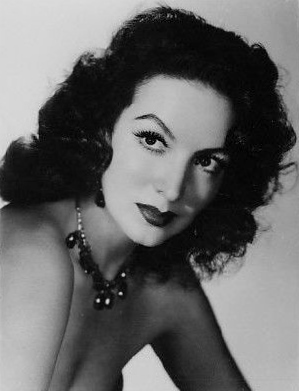
Félix in a publicity photo, c. 1947

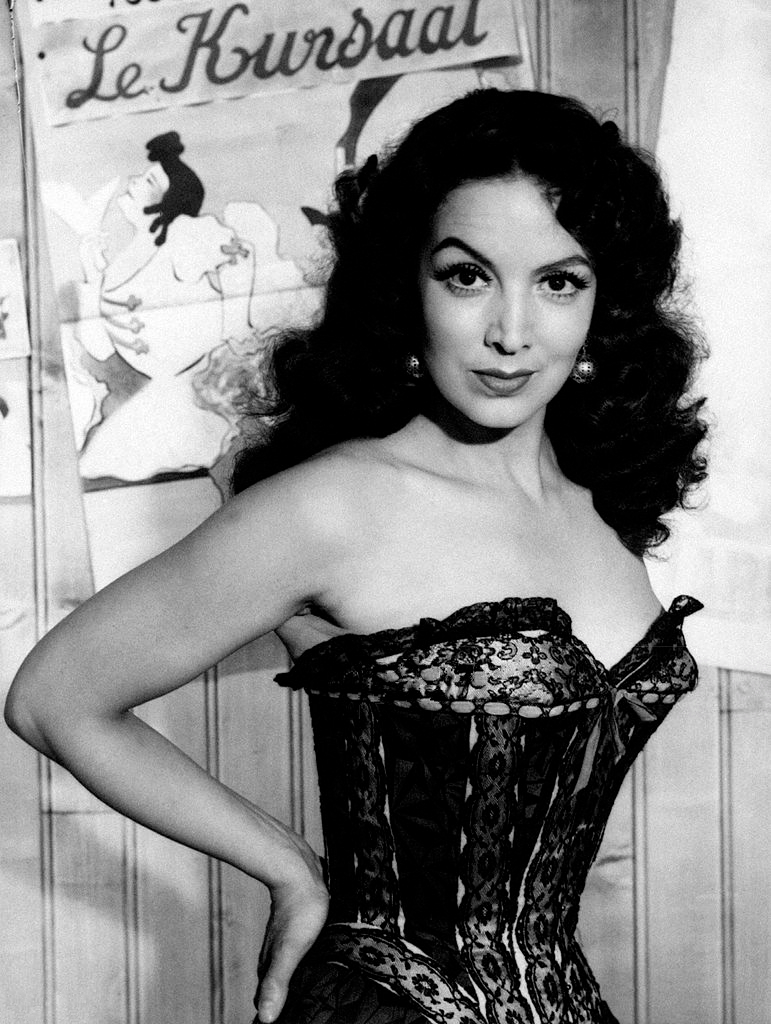
Félix in 1954

=== Art ===
During her life, Félix was a model for many renowned painters. In her adolescence she was painted in Guadalajara by José Clemente Orozco, but Félix said, "He painted me like a skull with make-up." Félix met the artist Diego Rivera during the filming of Río Escondido (1947). Félix developed a friendship with him and his wife, Frida Kahlo. In 1949, Rivera painted a portrait of her, which Félix classified as "very bad". In later years, Rivera asked to borrow the painting to be displayed as part of a retrospective on Rivera's work, but Félix refused. Félix did not like the painting and she sold it to Juan Gabriel for 15 million pesos. Félix would say, “I've never liked Rivera's painting, I told him. I wanted him to paint me as a Tehuana, but he said it was very vulgar, so he painted me as he wanted ... naked, because he was very much in love with me. Later, Diego wanted that portrait for an exhibition in the Palacio de Bellas Artes, but since I did not lend it to him, he stopped talking to me for more than a year. One day there was a bricklayer fixing my house, and I sent him to paint [my nude portrait] with white to cover a bit of everything and that's how it ended up. I sold it, very badly sold by the way."

Other renowned artists who recorded Félix in their canvases were the Surrealists Leonor Fini, Leonora Carrington, Remedios Varo and Bridget Tichenor among others. In the 1980s, the Russian-French artist Antoine Tzapoff (Félix's last partner) captured her in numerous portraits.

=== Literature, Music, and Theater ===
Félix also had dealings with numerous Mexican and foreign writers and playwrights some of whom have dedicated several novels. Among them they are Renato Leduc, Xavier Villaurrutia, Salvador Novo, Pita Amor, Jean Cocteau and Octavio Paz. Luis Spota was inspired by her life for his novel The Empty Star, and Félix even starred in the film version in 1958. Carlos Fuentes did the same in the novel Zona sagrada. Her relationship with Fuentes was terminated when the author made the play Orchids in the Moonlight, in which he parodies the figures of Félix and Dolores del Río. Félix, angry, called him "mujerujo" ("womanish").

Songs were composed for Félix, including María de Todas las Marías by Juan Gabriel and Je l'aime à mourir by Francis Cabrel.

=== Fashion ===
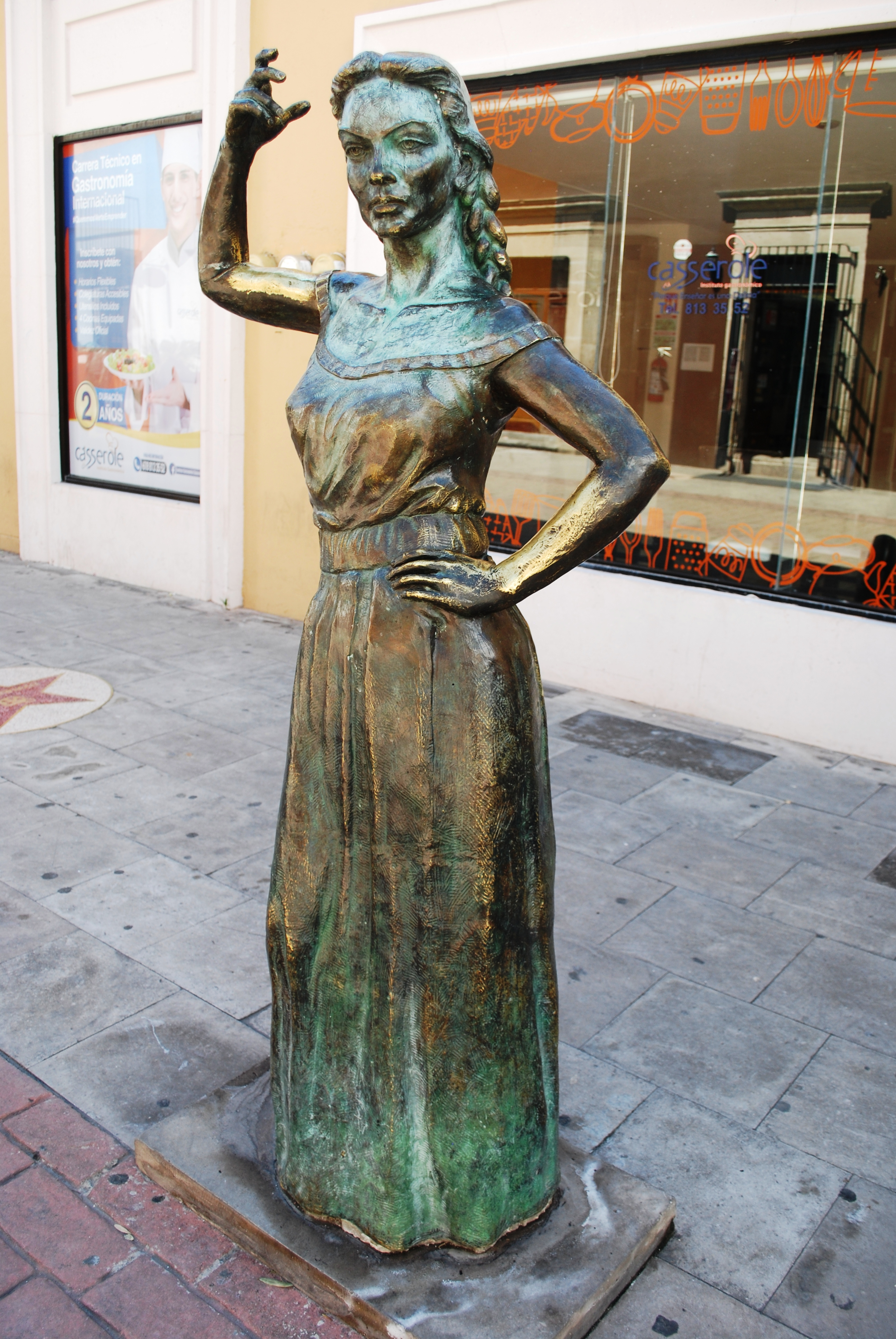
María Félix on the Paseo de las Estrellas

In fashion, Félix was dressed by designers like Christian Dior, Givenchy, Yves Saint Laurent, Chanel, and Balenciaga. The House of Hermès (Couture Department) designed extravagant creations just for her. She was a noted collector of fine antiques, favoring pieces like her famous collection of Second French Empire furniture. She was also a jewelry connoisseur and had an extensive jewelry collection, including the 41.37 carat (8.274 g), D-flawless Ashoka diamond. In 1968, she commissioned a serpent diamond necklace from Cartier. The result was a completely articulated serpent made out of platinum and white gold and encrusted with 178.21 carats (35.642 g) of diamonds. In 1975, she again asked Cartier to create a necklace for her, this time in the shape of two crocodiles. The two crocodile bodies were made of 524.9 grams of gold, one covered with 1,023 yellow diamonds, while the other was adorned with 1,060 circular cut emeralds. Later she sold most of her jewelry back to Cartier. She also left a Rolls-Royce in Paris.

Since Félix's death, these jewelry pieces have been displayed as part of The Art of Cartier Collection in several museums around the world. To pay tribute to the actress, in 2006 Cartier debuted its La Doña de Cartier collection. The La Doña de Cartier watch with reptilian links was created to impress by its wild look. The case of the La Doña de Cartier features a trapezoid shape with an asymmetrical profile reminiscent of a crocodile's head. The wristband of the watch resembles the contours of a crocodile in large, bold and gold scales. The La Doña de Cartier Collection also includes jewelry, accessories, and handbags.

Mexican milliner to the stars Gladys Tamez dedicated a hat collection "El Fénix" inspired by and intended to honor Félix.

In 2023, Museo Jumex in Mexico City displayed iconic jewelry pieces worn by Maria Félix in the exhibition "Cartier Design: A Living Legacy" that featured more than 160 pieces and was designed by renowned Mexican architect Frida Escobedo and curated by the Mexican art critic Ana Elena Mallet.

== Death and legacy ==
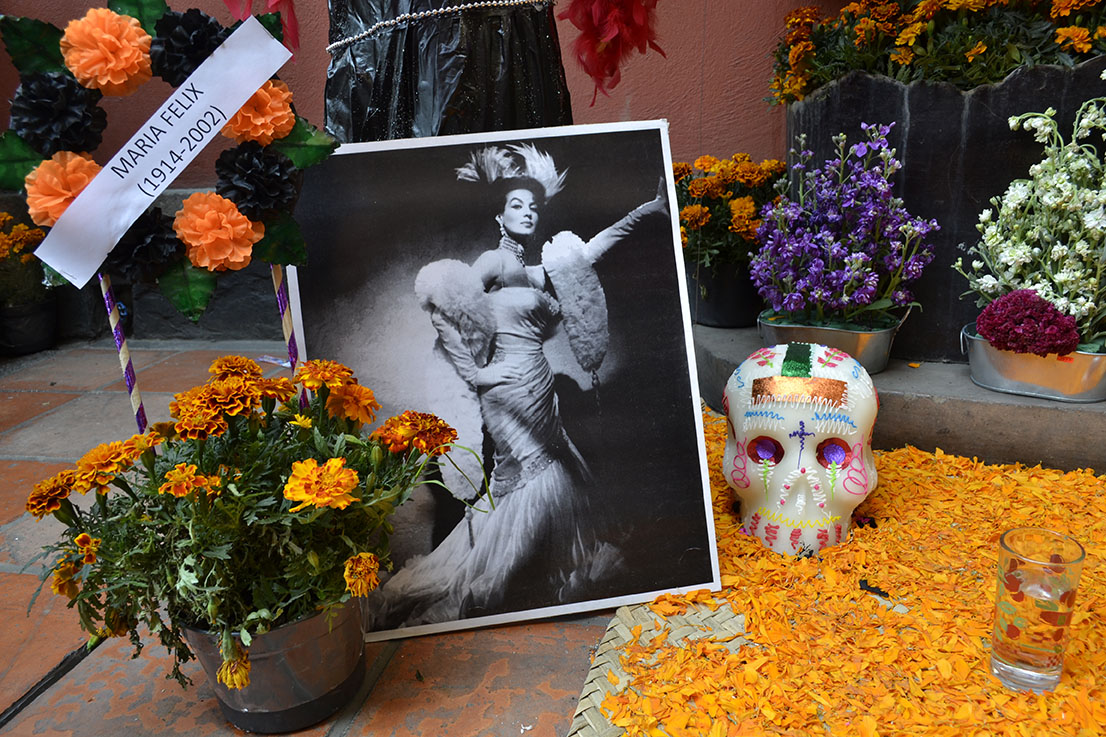
A public ofrenda for Félix on the Day of the Dead commemoration at San Ángel, Mexico City

María Félix died in her sleep on 8 April 2002, her 88th birthday in Mexico City. She was buried in her family's mausoleum alongside her son Enrique and parents at the Panteón Francés located in Mexico City.

In 2014, Fomento Social Maria Félix A.C., holder of the Reserva de Derechos in Mexico, acquired Félix's IP rights. The Estate of Maria Félix S.A. de C.V. was granted the international right to commercialise the IP rights held by Fomento Social Maria Félix A.C. and, in this regard, in 2021 signed an agreement with CMG Worldwide, Inc. to be its sole exclusive and worldwide representative.

In 2018, Google celebrated Félix's 104th birthday with a Google Doodle. A skeletal version of Felix appears briefly in the 2017 Pixar film Coco, as a guest at a party in the Land of the Dead, with luchador El Santo as her date.

In July 2022, the TelevisaUnivision produced biopic María Félix: La Doña, starring Sandra Echeverría, was released on streaming service Vix.

In April 2023, a Spanish-language documentary directed by Dan Chávez, María, la diva eterna was released on Vix and is now available on Apple TV+ and Prime Video.

In May 2023, Cartier Design: A Living Legacy, an exhibition held at Museo Jumex in Mexico City, featured several pieces of Cartier jewelry owned by Félix. In 2025, the Victoria and Albert Museum in London also featured Félix's jewels in their Cartier exhibition.

== Discography ==
La voz de María y la inspiración de Agustín (RCA Víctor, 1964)

Side one:

1. "Por qué negar"
2. "Gotas de amor"
3. "Escarcha"
4. "Limosna"
5. "Noche de ronda"
6. "Te quiero"

Side two:

1. "Volverás"
2. "Una cualquiera"
3. "Arráncame la vida"
4. "Cada noche un amor"
5. "Rival"
6. "Solamente una vez"

Enamorada (Fonovisa, 1998)

1. "Ella"
2. "La cigarra"
3. "El corrido del norte"
4. "Pobre corazón"
5. "La noche de mi mal"
6. "Cada noche un amor"
7. "Mano a mano"
8. "De mi barrio"
9. "Escándalo"
10. "Silencio"
11. "Et maintenant"
12. "Je l'aime à mourir"
13. "Prends garde"

== See also ==
- List of people from Morelos
