= Ignacio López Tarso =

Mexican actor (1925–2023)

- Tarso in Macario (1960)
- Born: Ignacio López López; 15 January 1925; Mexico City, Mexico
- Died: 11 March 2023 (aged 98); Mexico City, Mexico
- Occupation: Actor
- Years active: 1940s–2023
- Spouse: Clara Aranda (died 2000)
- Children: 3; including Juan Ignacio
- Awards: List of awards

Ignacio López Tarso (born Ignacio López López; 15 January 1925 – 11 March 2023) was a Mexican actor of stage, film and television. He acted in about 50 films and appeared in documentaries and in one short feature. In 1973 he was given the Ariel Award for Best Actor for Rosa Blanca, and the Ariel de Oro lifetime achievement award in 2007. He was honored multiple times at the TVyNovelas Awards. At the time of his death, along with Armando Silvestre, he was the oldest living actor and one of the last surviving stars from the Golden Age of Mexican cinema.

== Biography ==
=== Early life and education ===
López Tarso was born in Mexico City to parents Alfonso López Bermúdez and Ignacia López Herrera, first cousins from the state of Guanajuato. Because of his father's job, he spent his childhood in several cities including Veracruz, Hermosillo, Navojoa and Guadalajara. He had two siblings: Alfonso and Marta. At around age 8–9, when he was in Guadalajara, his parents took him to see a play, where he became interested in acting.

López Tarso lived in Valle de Bravo, Estado de México, where he went to secondary school. Although his family's economic problems kept him from attending high school, he joined seminaries in Temascalcingo, Estado de México, and Mexico City to continue his education. During his time there, a visiting priest from the United States organized a group to perform plays, in which he participated. He learned to read oral poetry and books of classical plays, including those by Lope de Vega and Calderón de la Barca.

When he was 20, he joined the military service at Querétaro, where he was in barracks for about a year. He also served in the Veracruz and Monterrey regiments, and eventually reached First Sergeant grade. After completing his service, he declined an opportunity to attend military school, even though he liked the discipline.

López Tarso worked in Mexico City as a sales agent for a clothing company. He aspired to work in the United States, and planned to work at an orange grove in Merced, California. However, a few days in, he fell from a tree and injured his vertebrae. He returned to Mexico City for rehabilitation therapy which lasted about a year.

=== Theatre ===
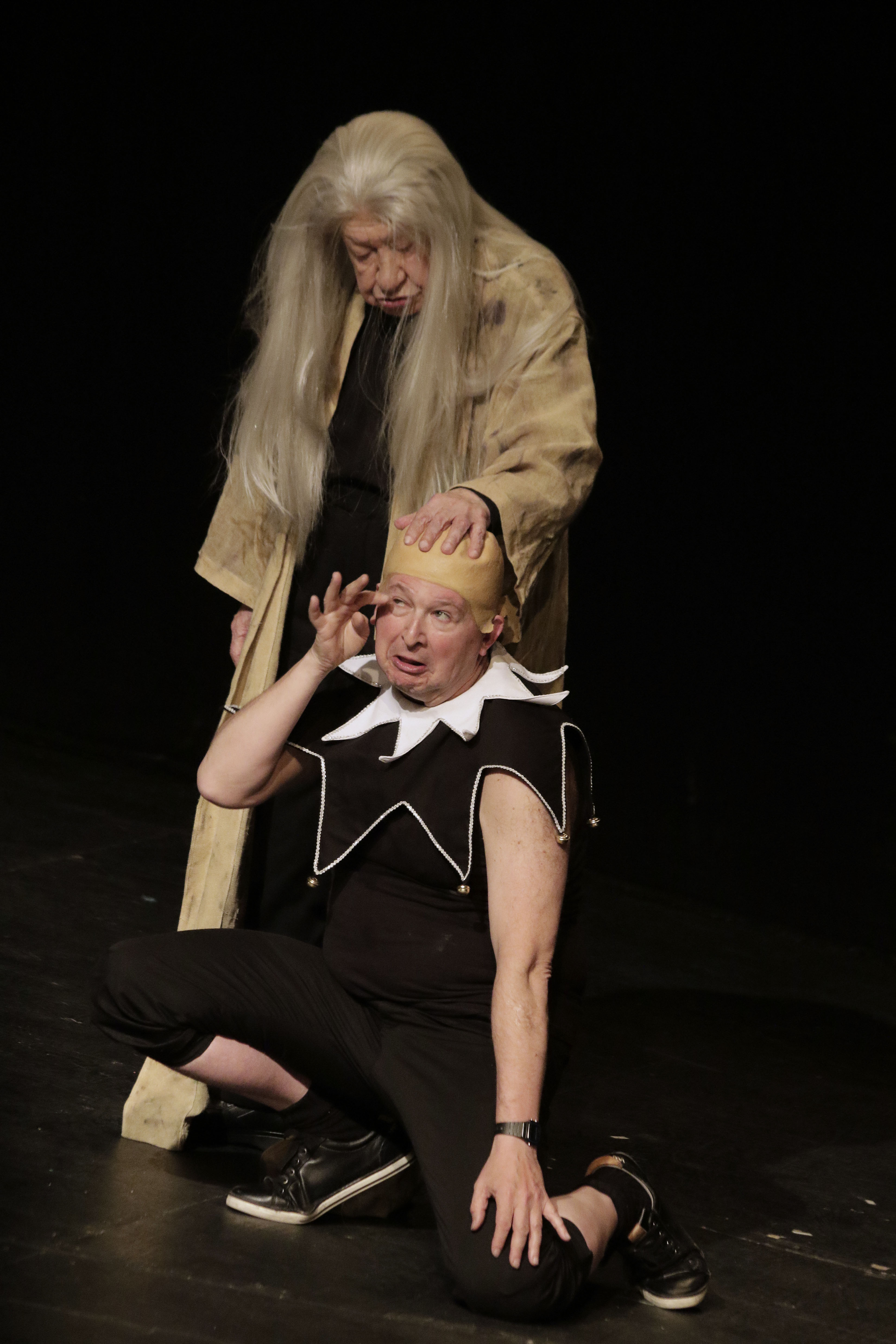
Tarso (with wig) during a play in August 2019

While López was in physical therapy, he read books on poetry and theatre, and became a fan of author Xavier Villaurrutia. After his recovery, he heard that Villaurrutia was teaching theatre at the Palacio de Bellas Artes, so he visited him, initially to ask for his autograph, but then was invited to listen in on his lessons. After a few days, he formally joined the theatre academy at age 24. When Villaurrutia advised Lopez to pick a stage name, he changed from "López López" to "López Tarso"; the Tarso was Spanish for Paul the Apostle's hometown of Tarsus, and also one of the cities in Mexico where Lopez had once lived. Besides Villaurrutia, he studied under other masters such as Salvador Novo, Clementina Otero, Celestino Gorostiza, André Moreau, Seki Sano, Fernando Wagner and Fernando Torre Lapham.

López Tarso's professional stage debut was in 1951 for the play Born Yesterday by Garson Kanin. He would also perform in several William Shakespeare plays such as A Midsummer Night's Dream, Macbeth, Othello and King Lear. Other productions included: The Crucible by Arthur Miller, Oedipus Rex and Oedipus at Colonus by Sophocles, Hippolytus by Euripides, La Celestina by Fernando de Rojas, Cyrano de Bergerac by Edmond Rostand, The Miser by Molière, El villano en su rincón by Lope de Vega, The Mayor of Zalamea by Calderón de la Barca, Exit the king by Eugène Ionesco, and "Equus" by Peter Shaffer. He also performed works from authors Sor Juana Inés de la Cruz, Miguel de Cervantes, Guillén de Castro, Hugo Argüelles, Emilio Carballido, Ramón María del Valle-Inclán, over a hundred productions throughout his career.

Ignacio López Tarso's theatrical work has been mostly performing in drama, though in the years 2014 and 2015 he starred in a two-person comedy written by Carlos Gorostiza and titled Aeroplanos ("Airplanes"); his performance on stage was presented with Sergio Corona who alternated appearances with Manuel "Loco" Valdés. The play was presented at the Teatro Independencia in Mexico City.

=== Film ===
López Tarso's film debut was in 1954, when he played a minor character in La desconocida, which was directed by Chano Urueta.

He played the title character Macario, a supernatural drama directed by Roberto Gavaldón set on the Day of the Dead. The film was entered into the 1960 Cannes Film Festival. and was the first Mexican film to be nominated for an Academy Award for Best Foreign Language Film in 1961. López Tarso won a Golden Gate Award for Best Actor at the San Francisco International Film Festival in 1960, and another for his work in the 1963 film El hombre de papel (released in English as The Paper Man), directed by Ismael Rodríguez.

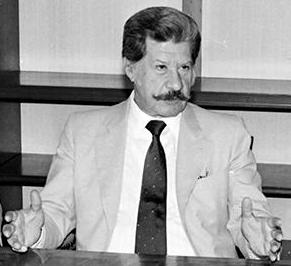
Tarso in 1986

In 1961, López Tarso starred in Rosa Blanca, directed by Gavaldón. Because the film was censured by political interests of the time, it was not released until 1972. He won the Ariel Award for Best Actor in 1973. Other notable movie performances included: Cri Cri, el grillito cantor (1963), directed by Tito Davison; La vida inútil de Pito Pérez (1969), directed by Gavaldón; The prophet Mimi (1972), directed by José Estrada; Rapiña (1973), directed by Carlos Enrique Taboada; and The bricklayers (1976), directed by Jorge Fons.

As part of the Golden Age of Mexican cinema, López Tarso acted in over fifty films, sharing starring roles with actors such as Dolores del Río, María Félix, Marga López, Carlos López Moctezuma, Elsa Aguirre, Luis Aguilar, Katy Jurado, Irasema Dilián, Pedro Armendáriz and Emilio el indio Fernández.

Besides film, López Tarso appeared in over twenty television series, and released eight albums, in many of which he recited poems and corridos about the Mexican Revolution. He also positions in various organizations and trade unions related to the acting and cinematographic professions. Between 1988 and 1991 he served as a federal deputy, representing Mexico City's eighth district for the Institutional Revolutionary Party (PRI).

== Personal life and death ==
López Tarso married Clara Aranda, who predeceased him in 2000. They had three children: Susana, Gabriela and the actor Juan Ignacio Aranda.

On 22 May 2016, Tarso underwent surgery to treat a growing tumor in his large intestine and polyps in his small intestine. Tarso was later placed in intensive care.

In early March 2023, López Tarso was hospitalized for pneumonia and an intestinal obstruction. He died in Mexico City on 11 March 2023, at the age of 98.

== Awards and accolades ==
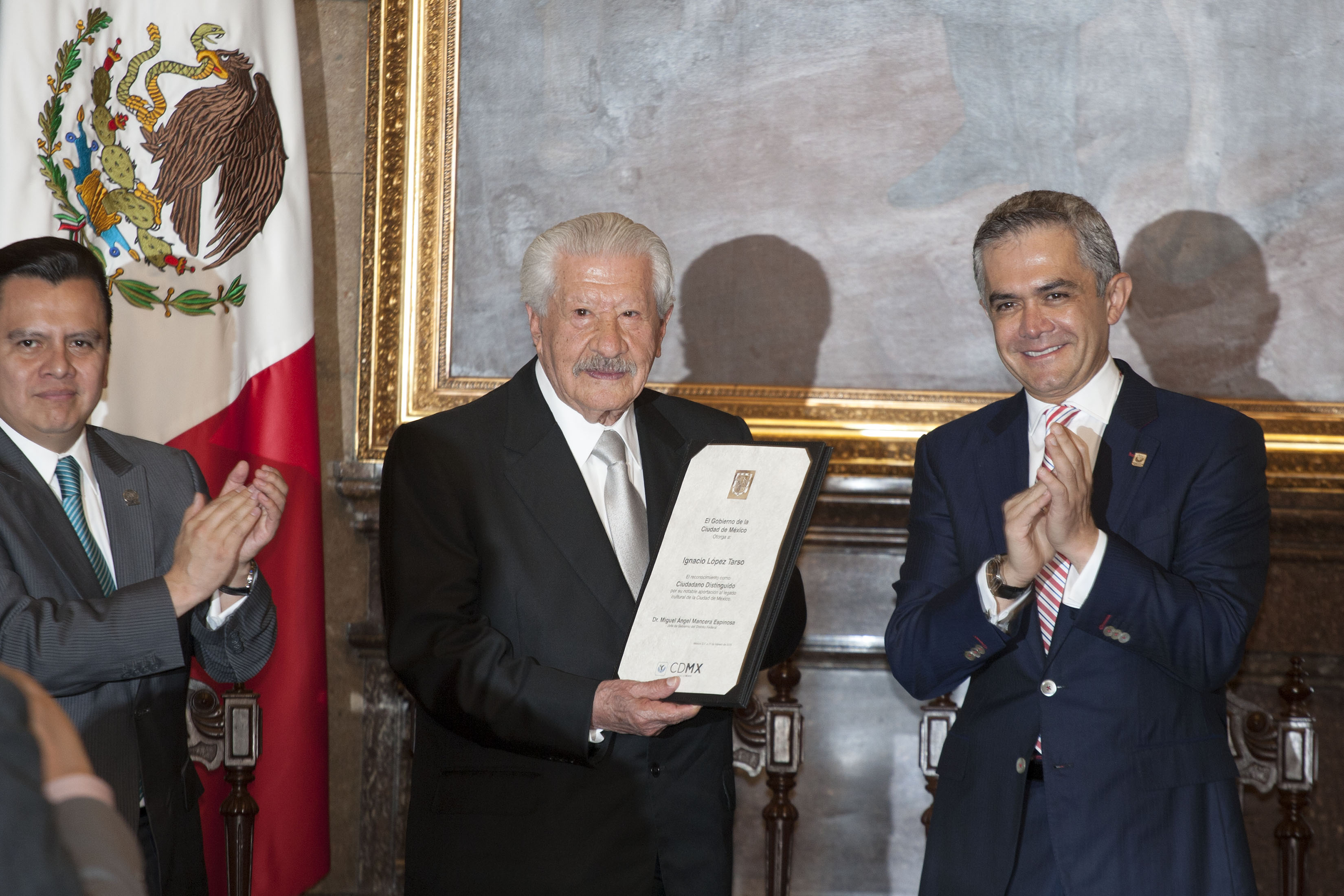
Tarso holding a recognition paper in a homage done for him by the Mexico City Government in 2015

López Tarso won many Mexican and international awards including the following:

- Golden Gate Award (San Francisco International Film Festival 1960, United States) Best Actor for Macario.
- Golden Gate Award (San Francisco International Film Festival 1963, United States) Best Actor for The Paper Man.
- Ariel Award (Mexican Academy of Film, 1973, Mexico) Best Actor for Rosa Blanca.
- Association of Latin Entertainment Critics Award (2001, United States).
- Hispanic Heritage Society Award (2006, United States).
- Ariel de Oro (Mexican Academy of Film, 2007, Mexico) for his lifetime achievement in the film industry. Shared award with the cinematographer, Rosalío Solano.
- TVyNovelas Awards (Mexican Award 2011, Mexico) for his lifetime achievement on stage. Shared award with the actress, Silvia Pinal

=== Premios Ariel ===
Year	Category	Movie	Result
1973	Best Performance	Rosa blanca	Won
1974	Best Performance	El profeta Mimí	Nominated
1975	Best Performance	Rapiña	Nominated

=== TVyNovelas Awards ===
Year	Category	Telenovela	Result
1983	Best Male Antagonist	El derecho de nacer	Nominated
1988	Best First Actor	Senda de gloria	Nominated
1991	Best First Actor	Ángeles blancos	Nominated
1995	Best First Actor	Imperio de cristal	Won
1998	Best First Actor	Esmeralda	Nominated
2001	Best First Actor	La casa en la playa	Nominated
2003	Best First Actor	De pocas, pocas pulgas	Won
2014	Best First Actor	Corazón Indomable	Nominated

== Filmography ==
=== Films ===
Year	Title	Role	Notes
1954	La desconocida		Debut film
1955	Chilam Balam		
1957	Feliz año, amor mío	Manuel	
1957	Vainilla, bronce y morir	Ricardo Castillo	
1958	Ama a tu prójimo		Voice only
1959	Nazarín	El sacrílego	
1959	Sonatas	Jefe de guerrilleros	
1959	La cucaracha	Trinidad	
1959	El hambre nuestra de cada día	Pablo	
1960	Macario	Macario	Lead role
1960	La estrella vacía	Luis Arvide	
1960	La sombra del Caudillo	General Hilario Jiménez	
1961	Ellas también son rebeldes	Dr. Gabriel Renteria	
1961	Juana Gallo	Pioquinto	
1961	Los hermanos Del Hierro	El pistolero	
1961	Y Dios la llamó tierra	Efren Domínguez	
1961	Rosa Blanca	Jacinto Yáñez	Lead role
1962	La bandida	Anselmo	
1963	Corazón de niño		
1963	El hombre de papel	Adán	
1963	Días de otoño	Albino	
1963	Cri Cri el grillito cantor	Francisco Gabilondo Soler "Cri-Cri"	
1964	Furia en el Edén		
1964	El gallo de oro	Dionisio Pinzón	
1965	Un hombre en la trampa	Javier Ortiz	
1965	Tarahumara	Raúl	
1967	Pedro Páramo	Fulgor Sedano	
1968	Un largo viaje hacia la muerte		
1968	Las visitaciones del diablo	Félix Estrella	
1969	La puerta y la mujer del carnicero	Melitón Torres	Segment: "La mujer del carnicero"
1969	La trinchera		
1970	La vida inútil de Pito Pérez	Pito Pérez	
1971	La Generala	Rosauro Márquez	
1972	Cayó de la gloria el diablo	Don Emeterio Sánchez	
1973	El profeta Mimi	Ángel Peñafiel, Mimi	
1973	The Divine Caste	Don Wilfrido	
1974	En busca de un muro	José Clemente Orozco	
1974	Hernán Cortés		Short film
1975	Rapiña		
1976	Renuncia por motivos de salud	Ingeniero Gustavo Sánchez Camero	
1984	Under the Volcano	Dr. Vigil	

=== Television ===
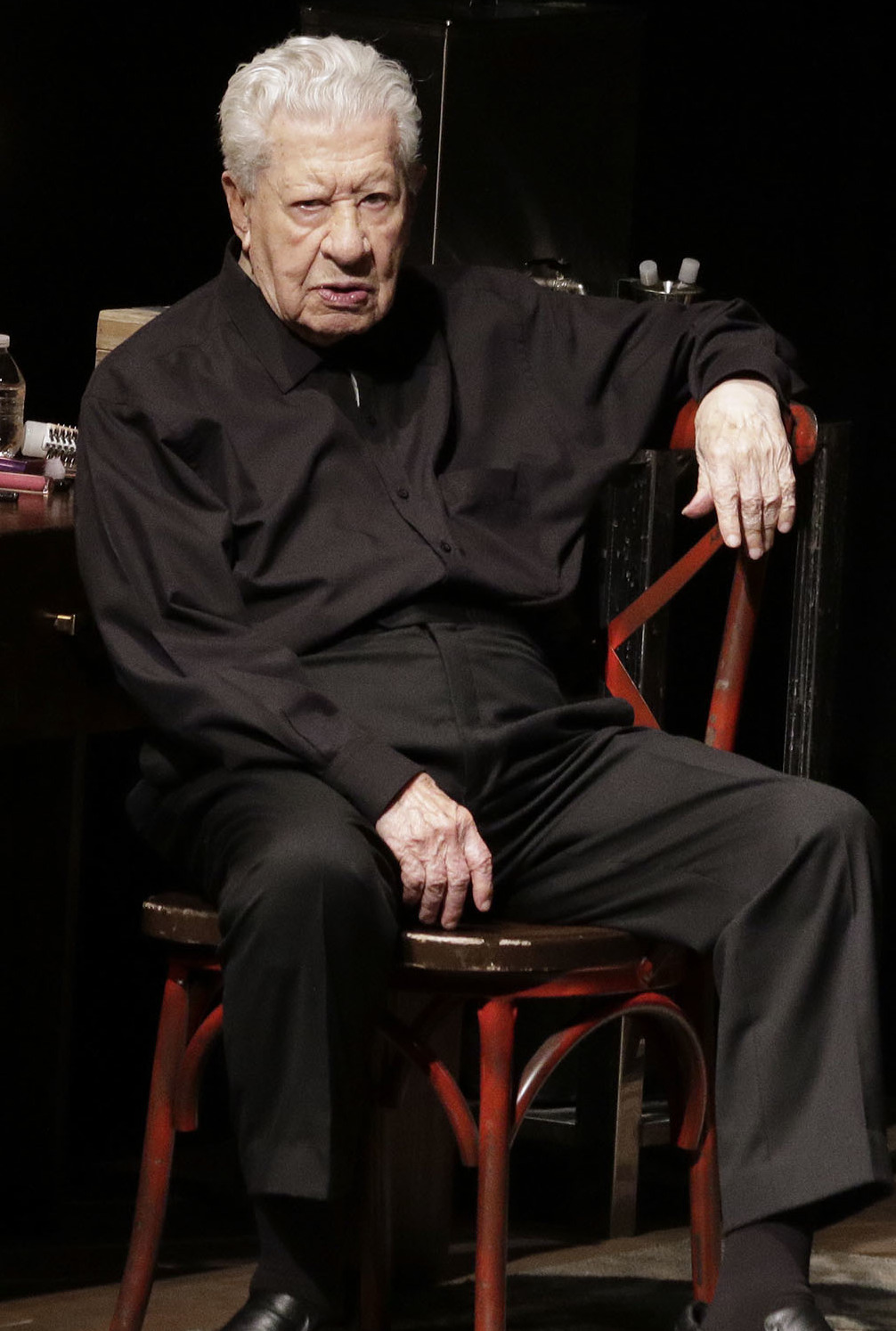
Tarso in 2019

Year	Title	Role	Notes
1957	Noches de angustia		Television debut
1961	Cuatro en la trampa		
1963–1964	Gran teatro		Episodes: "Cyrano De Bergerac" & "Hipolito"
1966	Amor y orgullo		
1967	La tormenta	Gabriel	
1970	La constitución		
1971	Rosas para Verónica		
1972	El edificio de enfrente		
1972	El carruaje	Cura	
1973	El honorable Señor Valdez	Humberto Valdéz	Lead role
1978	La trampa	Henry Morell	
1979	Amor prohibido	Arturo Galván	
1980	El combate		
1981	El periquillo sangriento		
1981	El derecho de nacer	Don Rafael del Junco	
1987	Senda de gloria	General Eduardo Álvarez	
1990	Ángeles blancos	Perfecto	
1994	Imperio de cristal	Don César Lombardo	
1995	Bajo un Mismo Rostro		
1997	Esmeralda	Melesio	
1998	Camila	Genaro	
1998	Ángela	Feliciano Villanueva	
2000	La casa en la playa	Don Ángel Villarreal Cueto	
2001	Atrévete a olvidarme	Gonzalo Rivas	
2001	Navidad sin fin	Rodito	
2002–2003	¡Vivan los niños!	Don Ignacio Robles	
2003	De pocas, pocas pulgas	Don Julián Montes	
2005	La esposa virgen	Francisco Ortiz	
2005	Peregrina	Don Baltazar	
2007	Amor sin maquillaje		
2008	Mañana es para siempre	Isaac Newton Barrera	
2009	Mar de amor	El Mojarras	
2011	La Fuerza del Destino	Don Severiano	
2011	La que no podía amar	Fermín Peña	
2013	Corazón Indomable	Don Ramiro Olivares	
2014	La malquerida	Juan Carlos Maldonado	
2015	Amores con trampa	Don Porfirio Carmona	
2019	Médicos, línea de vida	Héctor	

== Discography ==
1964 Corridos De La Revolucion (CBS)

1966 Mas Corridos - Volumen 2 (CBS)

1969 Relatos Y Corridos De La Revolucion Mexicana (CBS)

1972 En Las Trincheras De La Revolucion Con Ignacio López Tarso (CBS)
