= Rosa Blanca =

La rosa blanca
- Directed by: Roberto Gavaldón
- Written by: Emilio Carballido; Roberto Gavaldón; Phil Stevenson
- Based on: Rosa blanca by B. Traven
- Produced by: Felipe Subervielle
- Starring: Ignacio López Tarso; Christiane Martel
- Cinematography: Gabriel Figueroa
- Edited by: Gloria Schoemann
- Music by: Raúl Lavista
- Production company: Clasa Films Mundiales
- Release date: 1961
- Running time: 105 minutes
- Country: Mexico
- Language: Spanish

La rosa blanca (The White Rose) is a 1961 Mexican film starring Ignacio López Tarso, based on a novel by B. Traven.

== Plot ==
An illiterate Indian lives an idyllic existence as a landowner on Mexico's Gulf Coast until the greed of an American oil company gets in the way. He is murdered and the lives of all those around him are destroyed as the company takes over the land by crooked means.
