= Ash Wednesday (1958 film) =

1958 film directed by Roberto Gavaldón

- DVD cover
- Directed by: Roberto Gavaldón
- Written by: Julio Alejandro; Luis G. Basurto; Roberto Gavaldón
- Produced by: Gregorio Walerstein
- Starring: María Félix
- Cinematography: Agustín Martínez Solares
- Edited by: Rafael Ceballos
- Release date: 2 October 1958
- Running time: 112 minutes
- Country: Mexico
- Language: Spanish

Ash Wednesday (Spanish: Miércoles de ceniza) is a 1958 Mexican drama film directed by Roberto Gavaldón. It was entered into the 8th Berlin International Film Festival.

== Plot ==
Victoria (María Félix) was attacked in her youth by a Catholic priest. Years later she is a famous prostitute and hates everything related to the Catholic Church. She falls in love with Dr. Federico Lamadrid (Arturo de Córdova), a hidden priest during the Cristero War.

== Cast ==
- María Félix as Victoria Rivas
- Arturo de Córdova as Dr. Federico Lamadrid
- Víctor Junco as José Antonio
- Rodolfo Landa as El Violador
- Andrea Palma as Rosa, amiga de Victoria
- María Rivas as Silvia
- María Teresa Rivas as Elvira
- David Reynoso as Enrique, coronel
- Carlos Fernández as Carlos
- Enrique García Álvarez as Padre Gonzalez
- Luis Aragón as General cristero
- Consuelo Guerrero de Luna as Mujer del burdel
- Arturo Soto Rangel as Notario
- Cuco Sánchez as Soldado cantante
- Arturo Castro 'Bigotón' as Borracho
