= Beyond All Limits =

1959 film

- Directed by: Roberto Gavaldón
- Written by: Libertad Blasco Ibáñez; Edwin Blum
- Based on: Flor de Mayo by Vicente Blasco Ibáñez
- Produced by: Miguel Contreras Torres
- Starring: María Félix
- Cinematography: Gabriel Figueroa
- Edited by: Gloria Schoemann
- Release date: 9 July 1959
- Running time: 114 minutes
- Country: Mexico
- Language: Spanish

Beyond All Limits (Spanish: Flor de mayo) is a 1959 Mexican drama film directed by Roberto Gavaldón. It was entered into the 9th Berlin International Film Festival.

== Cast ==
- María Félix - Magdalena Gombai
- Jack Palance - Jim Gatsby
- Pedro Armendáriz - Pepe Gamboa
- Carlos Montalbán - Nacho
- Domingo Soler - Priest
- Jorge Martínez de Hoyos - Rafael Ortega
- Emma Roldán - Carmela
- Humberto Almazán
- Agustín Fernández
- Pedro Galván
- Enrique Lucero
- Juan Múzquiz - Pepito
- Alberto Pedret
- Paul Stewart - Pendergast
- José Torvay
