= The Paper Man (1963 film) =

1963 film

- Directed by: Ismael Rodríguez
- Written by: Luis Spota; Ismael Rodríguez
- Produced by: Ismael Rodríguez
- Starring: Ignacio López Tarso
- Cinematography: Gabriel Figueroa
- Release date: 5 September 1963
- Running time: 110 minutes
- Country: Mexico
- Languages: Spanish; Italian

The Paper Man (Spanish: El hombre de papel) is a 1963 Mexican drama film directed by Ismael Rodríguez. The film was selected as the Mexican entry for the Best Foreign Language Film at the 36th Academy Awards, but was not accepted as a nominee.

== Plot ==
A homeless deaf mute man named Adán is a waste picker who one day stumbles upon 10,000 pesos. As he marvels in his new fortune he meets many characters who now accept him trying to get their part of the money. Eventually Adán buys a puppet named Titino from an unscrupulous ventriloquist, thinking he will have a companion with whom to talk. When the obvious dawns on him Adán angrily breaks the puppet. Eventually he resigns to take care of some puppies and to decide to do some change to the world.

== Cast ==
- Ignacio López Tarso as Adán
- Alida Valli as La Italiana
- Susana Cabrera as La Gorda
- Guillermo Orea as Tendero
- Alicia del Lago as María
- José Ángel Espinoza as Torcuato (as Ferrusquilla)
- Fannie Kauffman 'Vitola' as Prostituta
- Mario García 'Harapos' as El Gorgojo (as Harapos)
- Dolores Camarillo
- Raúl Castell as Don Trini
- Tizoc Rodríguez
- Jana Kleinburg
- Carlos Ancira as Comisario
- David Silva as Inspector de policía

== Awards ==
Ignacio López Tarso won the Golden Gate Award for Best Actor at the San Francisco International Film Festival, and Alida Valli was nominated for the Best Motion Picture Actress at the Golden Globes.

== See also ==
- List of submissions to the 36th Academy Awards for Best Foreign Language Film
- List of Mexican submissions for the Academy Award for Best Foreign Language Film
