= Camelia (1954 film) =

1954 film directed by Roberto Gavaldón

- Directed by: Roberto Gavaldón
- Written by: Alexandre Dumas fils Roberto Gavadón; Edmundo Báez; José Arenas
- Produced by: Cesareo Gonzalez; Gregorio Walerstein
- Starring: María Félix; Jorge Mistral; Ramón Gay
- Cinematography: Gabriel Figueroa
- Edited by: Rafael Ceballos
- Music by: Antonio Dáz Conde; José Alfredo Jiménez
- Distributed by: FILMEX; Suevia Films
- Release date: 1954
- Running time: 110 minutes
- Countries: Mexico; Spain
- Language: Spanish

Camelia is a 1954 Mexican drama film directed by Roberto Gavaldón and starring María Félix. It's based on the novel La Dame aux Camélias by Alexandre Dumas fils.

== Plot ==
In a bullfight, the bullfighter Rafael Torres (Jorge Mistral) gives a bull to the famous Mexican actress Camelia (María Félix). Unfortunately the show ends in tragedy, because Rafael is wounded by the bull. In full recovery, Rafael attends the theater where Camelia represents La Dame aux Camélias with the actor Armando (Carlos Navarro). In full function, Rafael purposely drops the crutches on which he leans to attract the attention of the woman, but she snubs him. Rafael finds out that Camelia is sick. The woman suffers terminal cancer. To see Camelia, Rafael manages to get Dr. Del Real (Miguel Ángel Ferriz) to entrust him with a morphine that the actress needs. Camelia also feels an attraction for Rafael. She invites him to a party where Rafael kisses her and hits her lover. Camelia follows Rafael to his car, where he declares his love. Camelia tells her about her life in front of the house where she was born and they both kiss. Already a lover of Camelia, Rafael feels jealous of the men around her and the life of a courtesan that she lives, so he decides to leave her and sends her a farewell letter. Camelia, visibly affected by her abandonment and her illness, begins to act badly in the theater and decides to look for Rafael, finding him in a train. She decides to accompany him to the villages where he fights. In the Ranch of Santín, they are seen by Armando and Nancy (Renée Dumas), a jealous friend of Camelia. Happy because Nancy has brought her morphine and the news of a cure for cancer, Camelia decides to return to her previous life and disappoints Rafael despite the plans they have for marriage. Enrique (Ramón Gay), Rafael's brother, recognizes Camelia as his former lover, for whom he fell in jail. Enrique gets drunk and convinces Camelia to leave Rafael while he offers her a serenade. Camelia continues with her purpose of getting away from Rafael and accepts Enrique's proposal, leaving only one letter. Time goes by. A seriously ill Camelia goes to Plaza Mexico to see the victorious Rafael, who gives him a bull with irony. Almost blind, Camelia invites Rafael to dinner; He kisses her and throws money in her face. Later, Camelia represents again La Dame aux Camélias. In a cabaret where he is with Nancy, Rafael receives a message from Del Real and goes to the theater. At the end of the show, he takes the stage when he notices Camelia's fragile state of health. She dies in his arms.

== Cast ==
- María Félix ... Camelia
- Jorge Mistral ... Rafael Torres
- Ramón Gay ... Enrique Torres
- Carlos Navarro ... Armando
- Renée Dumas ... Nancy
- Miguel Ángel Ferriz ... Dr. Del Real
- Florencio Castelló
