= The Kneeling Goddess =

1947 film by Roberto Gavaldón

- Theatrical release poster.
- Directed by: Roberto Gavaldón
- Written by: Edmundo Baez; Alfredo B. Crevenna; Tito Davison; Ladislas Fodor; José Revueltas; Roberto Gavaldón
- Produced by: Rodolfo Lowenthal; Jack Wagner
- Starring: María Félix; Arturo de Córdova; Rosario Granados
- Cinematography: Alex Phillips
- Edited by: Charles L. Kimball
- Music by: Rodolfo Halffter
- Production company: Panamerican Films
- Distributed by: Panamerican Films
- Release date: 13 August 1947
- Running time: 107 minutes
- Country: Mexico
- Language: Spanish

The Kneeling Goddess (Spanish: La diosa arrodillada) is a 1947 Mexican Melodrama film directed by Roberto Gavaldón and starring María Félix, Arturo de Córdova and Rosario Granados. It was shot at the Estudios Churubusco in Mexico City, with sets designed by the art director Manuel Fontanals.

== Plot ==
Married wealthy businessman Antonio (Arturo de Córdova) has been carrying on an affair with Raquel, a model and later a cabaret singer (María Félix). They separately decide to end it, he out of consideration for his wife Elena (Rosario Granados), Raquel because she is developing real feelings for him and is guilty about her promiscuous past, which he does not know about.

His wife asks him to purchase a statue like the Venus de Milo as the centerpiece of their new garden fountain. At the sculptor's, he encounters Raquel, who has modelled for the titular marble nude Kneeling Goddess, and buys it. He seeks to rekindle their relationship but she rebuffs him. With the statue as a constant reminder, he becomes obsessed with Raquel and Elena, despite being seriously ill with a chronic condition, becomes suspicious. Antonio begs Raquel to take him back but she says she will only do so if he divorces his wife.

When Elena dies suddenly and Antonio later marries Raquel, not everything is what it seems.

== Cast ==
- María Félix as Raquel Serrano
- Arturo de Córdova as Antonio Ituarte
- Rosario Granados as Elena
- Fortunio Bonanova as Nacho Gutiérrez
- Carlos Martínez Baena as Esteban
- Rafael Alcayde as Demetrio
- Eduardo Casado as Licenciado Jiménez
- Luis Mussot as Dr. Vidaurri
- Carlos Villarías as Juez
- Natalia Gentil Arcos as María
- Paco Martínez as Villarreal
- Rogelio Fernández as Marinero
- Alfredo Varela padre as Juez registro civil
- José Arratia
- Adolfo Ballano Bueno
- Fernando Casanova as Empleado juzgado
- Ana María Hernández as Invitada a fiesta
- Miguel Ángel López as Joven mensajero
- José Muñoz as Detective policía
- Juan Orraca as Detective
- Manuel Pozos as José
- Félix Samper as Asociado en mesa redonda
- Juan Villegas as Empleado de Antonio

== Production ==
Filming began on 10 February 1947 at the Estudios Churubusco in Mexico City.

One of the film's screenwriters, José Revueltas, was supposedly said to have been ordered by director Roberto Gavaldón to enlarge the role of Rosario Granados to make it as important as that of María Félix. Revueltas vehemently denied the insinuation in a letter addressed to the editor of one of the magazines that had published said allegation, and according to Emilio García Riera, "Revueltas defended his integrity in the letter with good reason, but the film is by itself evidence in his favor: [Rosario] Granados has a role that is in effect secondary, that allows to show off much less than that of María Félix."

However, what Revueltas said in his letter, regarding the fact that he and other filmmakers had received "the trust" of the film's producers to fulfill their vision, was contested by Revueltas himself in an interview 30 years later with Paco Ignacio Taibo I, where he affirmed that the plot, the adaptation and the script were beyond his control and that of all those involved. Revueltas affirmed: "[…] there were many of us collaborators and we all put a little here and a little there. […] After we had finished the script, Tito Davison put his hand on it again and things changed again. These kinds of disasters happen in cinema; some correct others and in the end no one remembers what they wrote. On the other hand, directors have their own ideas and ask that these appear in the script. Edmundo Báez said that some scriptwriters were like tailors, that we made the suit tailored to this star or the other. I thought we were not so much tailors as cobblers […]".

The explicit nature (for the time) of certain love scenes generated controversy. Revueltas said that apart from the problems with the script, "[Besides that] there was the censorship: it was the stupidest thing in the world. A censorship of idiots, with which it could not be argued." Several civil organizations criticized the film, claiming that it violated morality. In response to the scandal, the film's producers placed the statue used in the film in the lobby of the Chapultepec cinema, as an attraction factor for spectators. This caused one of the organizations protesting the film, the Comité Pro Dignificación del Vestuario Femenino (CPDVF, "Committee for the Dignification of Women's Clothing"), to steal the statue.

The explicit nature of the film's romantic scenes also affected Félix's relationship with his then-husband, composer Agustín Lara, to the point that calaveras literarias ("skull literature", mocking short poems made in Day of the Dead) and cartoons mocked Felix and Lara's crumbling relationship referring to the film.

== Reception ==
Cinémas d'Amérique Latine called it a "masterpiece of melodrama in which the heroine displays an eroticism out of the ordinary." However, in his book María Félix: 47 pasos por el cine, Paco Ignacio Taibo I, while referring to the film as a "very curious screwball", claimed that it "got lost in a convoluted plot", highlighting the fact that De Córdova's and Félix's character are lovers, only for his character to try to kill her at a certain point.

In Mujeres de luz y sombra en el cine mexicano: la construcción de una imagen (1939–1952), Julia Tuñon wrote: "It is a consistent proposal that contributes with a corpus that is inscribed within a social system of ideas and mentalities that follow a rhythm within the story with its characters."
