= Roberto Gavaldón =

Mexican film director

- Born: June 7, 1909; Jiménez, Chihuahua, Mexico
- Died: September 4, 1986 (aged 77); Mexico City, Mexico
- Occupation: Film director
- Years active: 1941–1979

Roberto Gavaldón (June 7, 1909 – September 4, 1986) was a Mexican film director.

His 1958 film Ash Wednesday was entered into the 8th Berlin International Film Festival and his 1959 film Beyond All Limits was entered into the following years festival. His 1960 film Macario was entered into the 1960 Cannes Film Festival and was nominated for an Academy Award for Best Foreign Language Film.

== Selected filmography ==
- La tierra del mariachi (1938)
- Café Concordia (1939)
- The Count of Monte Cristo (1942)
- The Shack (1945)
- The Associate (1946)
- La Otra (1946)
- The Private Life of Mark Antony and Cleopatra (1947)
- The Kneeling Goddess (1947)
- Adventures of Casanova (1948)
- The Shadow of the Bridge (1948)
- The Little House (1950)
- Rosauro Castro (1950)
- Desired (1951)
- In the Palm of Your Hand (1951)
- The Night Falls (1952)
- Soledad's Shawl (1952)
- The Boy and the Fog (1953)
- The Three Perfect Wives (1953)
- Camelia (1954)
- Untouched (1954)
- After the Storm (1955)
- The Littlest Outlaw (1955)
- De carne somos (1955)
- The Hidden One (1956)
- Ash Wednesday (1958)
- Beyond All Limits (1959)
- Macario (1960)
- Rosa Blanca (1961)
- Autumn Days (1963)
- El gallo de oro (1964)
- El hombre de los hongos (1976)
- La Playa vacia (1979)
