= Horror film =

Film genre

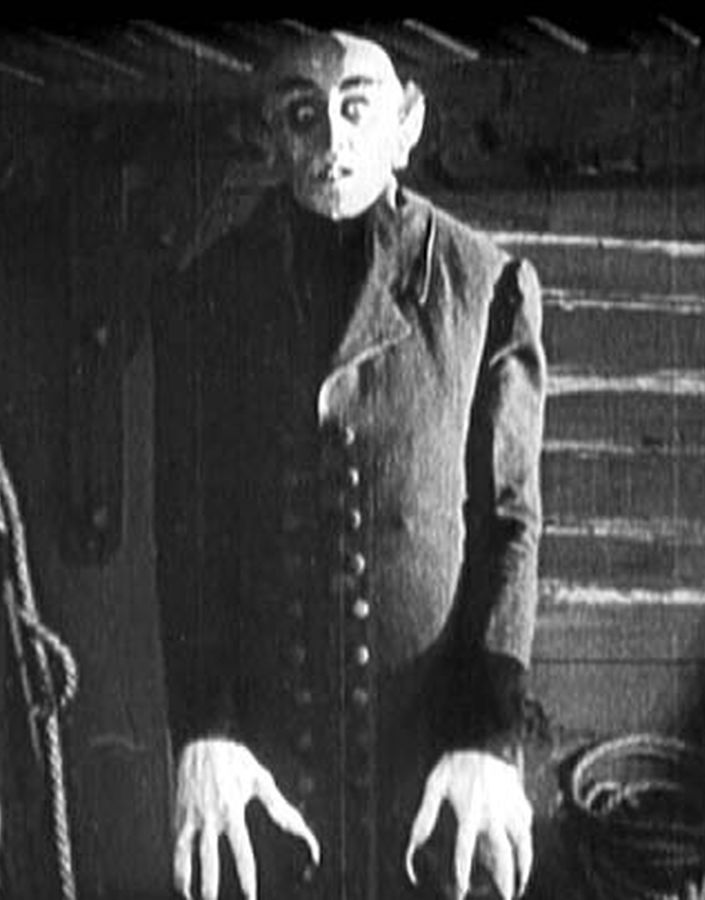
Max Schreck as Count Orlok in the 1922 film Nosferatu. Critic and historian Kim Newman declared that it set the template for the horror film.

Horror is a film genre that seeks to elicit physical or psychological fear in its viewers. Horror films often explore dark subject matter and may deal with transgressive topics or themes. Broad elements of the genre include monsters, apocalyptic events, and religious or folk beliefs.

Horror films have existed since the early 20th century. Early inspirations predating film include folklore; the religious beliefs and superstitions of different cultures; and the Gothic and horror literature of authors such as Edgar Allan Poe, Bram Stoker, and Mary Shelley. From its origins in silent films and German Expressionism, horror became a codified genre only after the release of Dracula (1931). Many sub-genres emerged in subsequent decades, including body horror, comedy horror, erotic horror, slashers, splatters, supernatural horror, and psychological horror. The genre has been produced worldwide, varying in content and style between regions. Horror is particularly prominent in the cinema of Japan, Korea, and Thailand, among other countries.

Despite being the subject of social and legal controversy due to their subject matter, some horror films and franchises have seen major commercial success, influenced society, and generated popular culture icons.

== Characteristics ==
The book The Film Experience: An Introduction (2021) defines the horror film as a genre with origins in Gothic literature that seeks to frighten the viewer. The authors highlight the fundamental elements of the horror film as "characters with physical, psychological, or spiritual deformities"; "narratives built on suspense, surprise, and shock"; and "visual compositions that move between the dread of not seeing and the horror of seeing".

Alternatively, The Dictionary of Film Studies (2012) defines the horror film as representing "disturbing and dark subject matter, seeking to elicit responses of fear, terror, disgust, shock, suspense, and (of course) horror from their viewers." In his chapter "The American Nightmare: Horror in the 70s" from the book Hollywood from Vietnam to Reagan (2002), film critic Robin Wood declared that the commonality between horror films is that "normality is threatened by the monster." This idea was further expanded on by Noël Carroll in his book The Philosophy of Horror, or Paradoxes of the Heart (1990); he noted that "repulsion must be pleasurable, as evidenced by the genre's popularity."

Before the release of Dracula (1931), as historian Gary D. Rhodes explained, the ideas and terminology of horror films did not yet exist as a codified genre, although critics had used the term horror to describe films in reviews prior to Dracula's release. Horror was a term used with a variety of meanings. In 1913, the magazine Moving Picture World defined horrors as showcasing "striped convicts, murderous Indians, grinning 'black-handers', homicidal drunkards". Some titles directly suggested horror, such as The Hand of Horror (1914), a melodrama about a thief who steals from his own sister. During the silent era, the term horror was used to describe everything from battle scenes in war films to stories of drug addiction. Rhodes concluded that the term horror film (or horror movie) was not used in early cinema.

The mystery film genre was then in vogue, and early information commonly promoted Dracula as a mystery film, despite the novel, the play, and the film relying on the supernatural. Kim Newman discussed the genre in British Film Institute's book Companion to Horror, where he noted that horror films in the 1930s were easy to identify, but after that decade, "the more blurred distinctions become, and horror becomes less like a discrete genre than an effect which can be deployed within any number of narrative settings or narrative patterns". In the 1940s, the horror film was viewed in different terms. Critic Siegfried Kracauer included The Lost Weekend among films described as "terror films," along with Shadow of a Doubt (1943), The Dark Corner (1946), Gaslight (1944), Shock (1946), The Spiral Staircase (1946), The Stranger (1946), and Spellbound (1945). Two years earlier, the New York Times described a new cycle of "horror" productions included Gaslight, The Woman in the Window (1944), Dark Waters (1944), Laura (1944), and Phantom Lady (1944). Mark Jancovich wrote in the book The Shifting Definitions of Genre: Essays on Labeling Films, Television Shows and Media (2008) that horror was virtually synonymous with mystery as a generic term, not being limited to films concerned with the strange, eerie, and uncanny.

Various writings on genre from Altman, Lawrence Alloway (Violent America: The Movies 1946-1964 (1971)) and Peter Hutchings (Approaches to Popular Film (1995)) implied that it is easier to view films as cycles rather than genres, suggesting that viewing the slasher film as a cycle would locate it in terms of several factors: the film industry's economy and production, the personnel involved in particular eras, and the manner of film marketing, distribution, and exhibition. In an essay, Mark Jancovich declared that "there is no simple 'collective belief' as to what constitutes the horror genre" among fans and critics of the genre. Jancovich found that disagreements existed between audiences who wanted to distinguish themselves. Such disagreement included fans of other genres who may view a film such as Alien (1979) as belonging to science fiction, as well as horror fans dismissing it as inauthentic for either genre. Further debates exist among genre fans having personal definitions of "true" horror films: some fans embrace cult figures such as Freddy Krueger of the A Nightmare on Elm Street series, while other fans disassociate themselves from characters and series and focus instead on genre auteur directors such as Dario Argento, while still other fans would deem Argento's films too mainstream, preferring more underground films. Andrew Tudor wrote in his book Monsters and Mad Scientists: A Cultural History of the Horror Movie that "Genre is what we collectively believe it to be."

=== Cinematic techniques ===
Jacob Shelton investigated in detail the many ways that horror films manipulate audience members. Shelton notes that negative space can draw viewers' eyes to anything in the frame—for example, a wall or the empty blackness in the shadows.

Anna Powell explores how horror directors use cinematography to induce certain viewer reactions. Powell observes that lighting extremes, whether bright or dark, can prevent viewers from seeing every detail in a scene, which provokes unease. Bright lighting might also trick viewers into feeling safe.

Powell also points out how distorting space and time can confuse and disorient horror film viewers. To confound viewers' senses, directors might use tilted camera angles and shots in slow-motion or reverse.

Powell notes that directors also use colour, through costuming, setting, and lens filters, to communicate mood and evoke certain connotations. Red, for example, might convey blood, passion, or disease. Contrasting colours bring viewers' attention to certain places in the frame.

The jump scare is a horror film trope where an abrupt change in image accompanied by a loud sound aims to surprise the viewer. This trope can also be subverted to create tension, as audiences may feel increased unease and discomfort in anticipating jump scares.

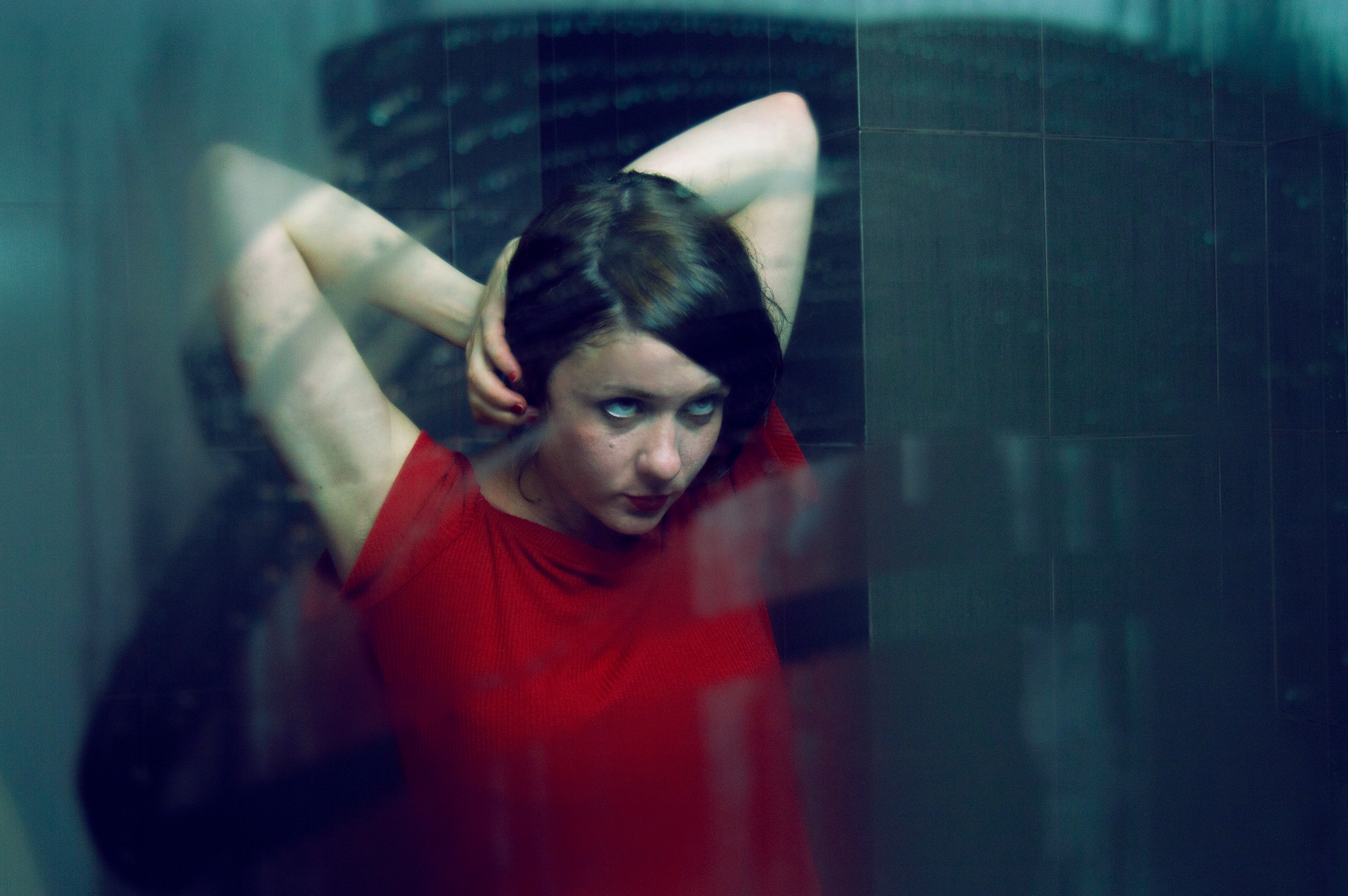
Mirrors are often used to create a sense of tension in horror films.

Mirrors are often used in horror films to create visual depth and build tension. Shelton argues that mirrors have been used so often in horror films that audiences have been conditioned to fear them, and subverting audience expectations of a jump scare in a mirror can further build tension. Tight framing and close-ups are also commonly used; these can build tension and induce anxiety by not allowing the viewer to see beyond what is near the protagonist.

The interaction between horror films and their audiences is another significant issue discussed by Rhodes. He notes that horror films often serve as a safe space for viewers to confront and process their fears. This cathartic experience can provide psychological relief and a sense of empowerment, as viewers face and overcome their anxieties in a controlled environment. The communal experience of watching horror films in theaters or discussing them in fan communities also plays a crucial role in the genre's impact and popularity.

=== Music ===
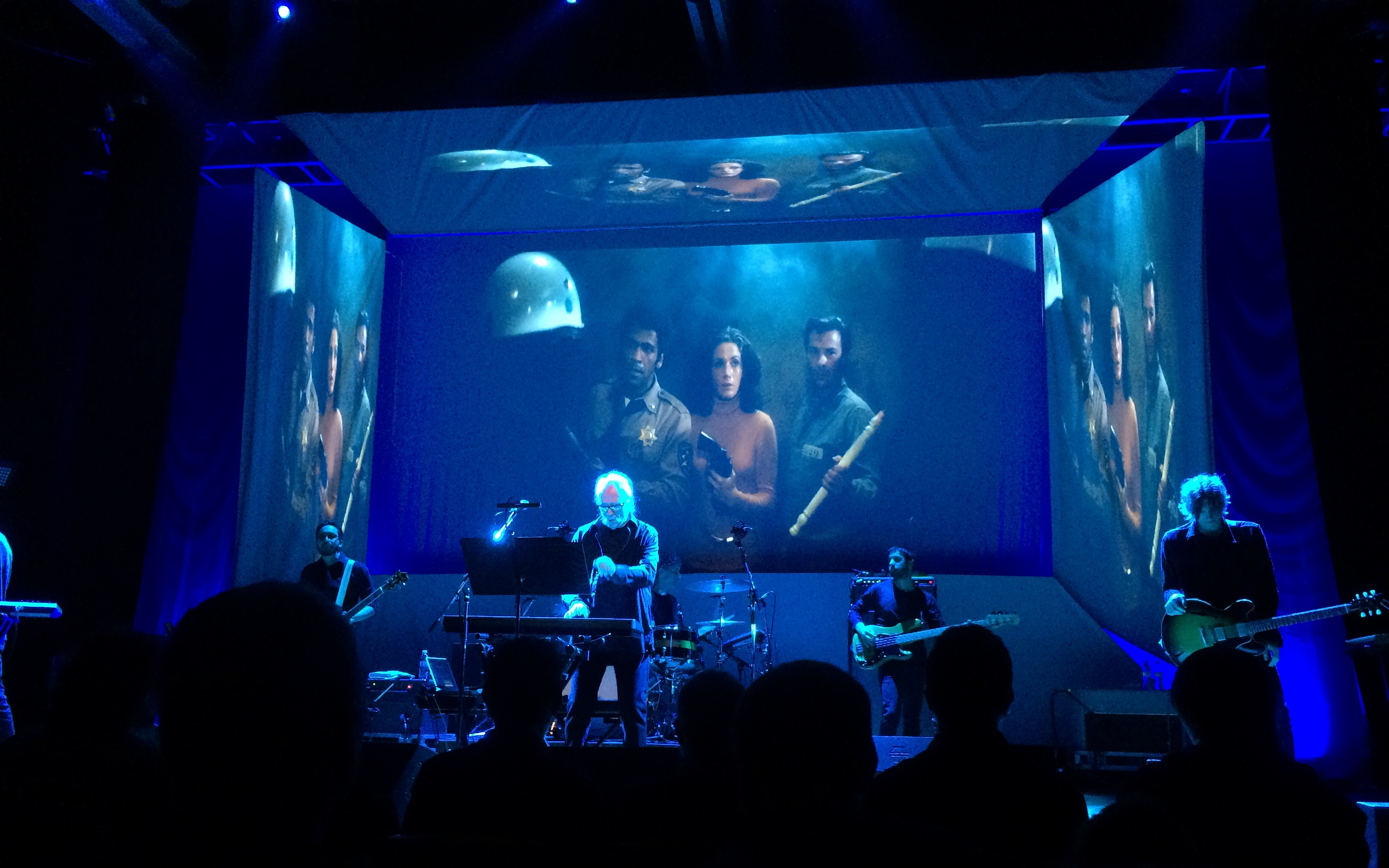
Filmmaker and composer John Carpenter, who has directed and scored numerous horror films, performing in 2016

Music is a key element of horror films. In his book Music in the Horror Film (2010), Lerner writes that "music in horror film frequently makes us feel threatened and uncomfortable" and intends to intensify the atmosphere created by imagery and themes. Music helps to set the tense or chilling mood that horror movies often aim to achieve; it can even cause physiological effects that override learned reactions and behaviors. Dissonance, atonality and experiments with timbre are typical techniques used by composers in horror film music.

=== Themes ===
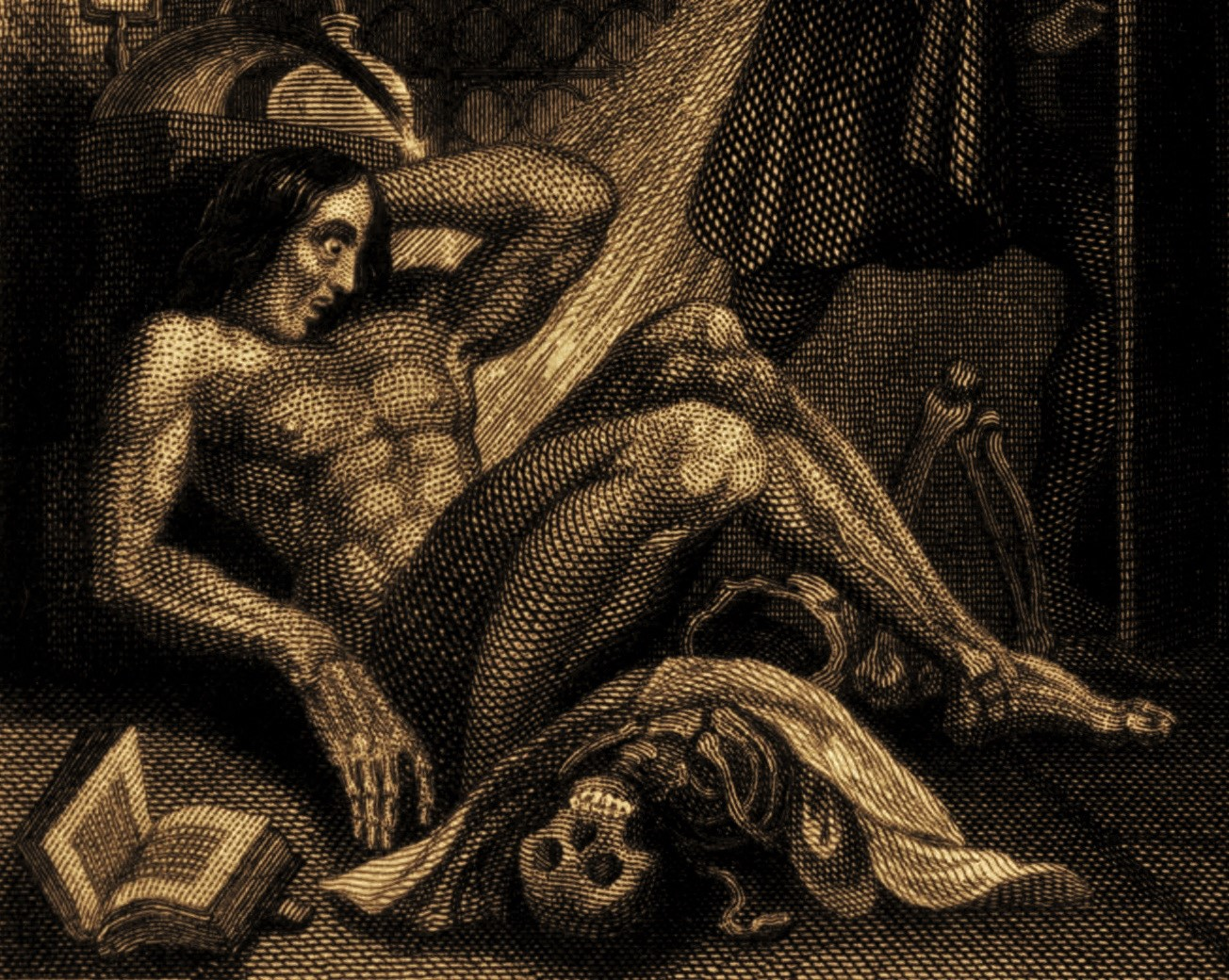
Frankenstein's monster

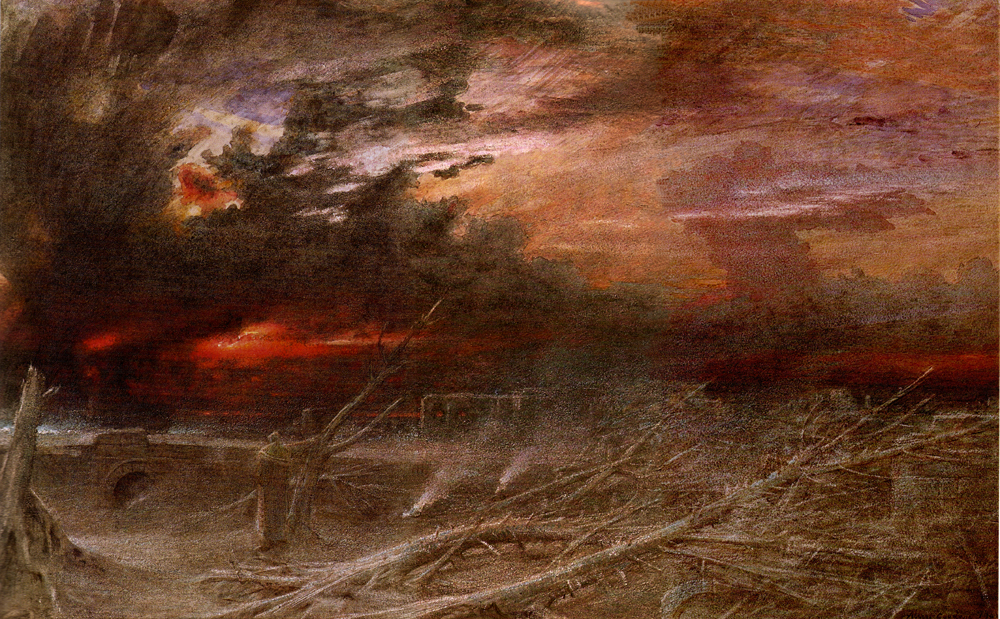
Apocalypse by Albert Goodwin

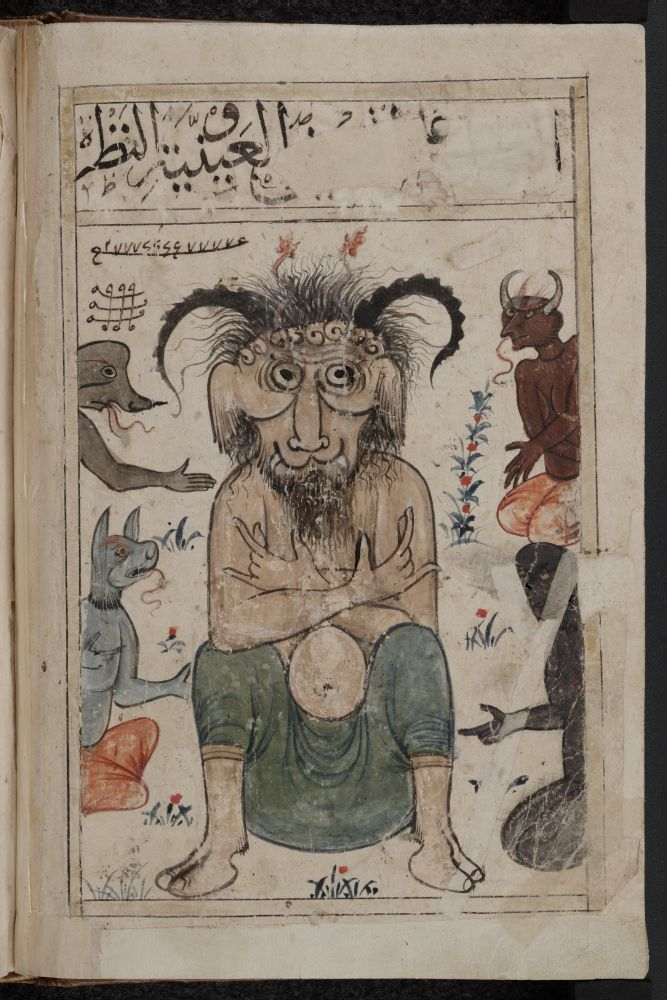
A demon in the Book of Wonders

Charles Derry proposed that the three key components of horror are personality, Armageddon and the demonic.

In his book Dark Dreams, author Charles Derry conceived horror films as focusing on three broad themes: the horror of personality, the horror of Armageddon, and the horror of the demonic. First, the horror of personality derives from monsters being at the centre of the plot, such as Frankenstein's monster, whose psychology makes them perform horrific acts including rapes, mutilations, and sadistic killings. Other key works with this theme include Alfred Hitchcock's Psycho (1960), which feature psychotic murderers without monster make-up. Second, the Armageddon theme explores the fear of large-scale destruction, which includes science fiction works but also natural events, such as Hitchcock's The Birds (1963). Finally, the theme of the demonic features graphic accounts of satanic rites, witchcraft, and exorcisms outside traditional forms of worship, as seen in films such as The Exorcist (1973) and The Omen (1976).

Some critics have suggested that horror films can be vessels for exploring contemporary cultural, political and social trends. Jeanne Hall, a film theorist, supports the use of horror films to ease the process of understanding issues by making use of their visual elements. The use of horror films can help audiences to understand prior historical events, for example, the Vietnam War, the Holocaust, the worldwide AIDS epidemic or post-9/11 pessimism.

Anxieties surrounding race and racism have historically and continuously informed the horror genre. A good example is the history of the zombie apocalypse subgenre. The first zombie horror films, such as White Zombie (1932), were inspired by stories brought back to Europe by colonizers, and these stories explicitly presented Afro-Haitian religious and spiritual practices as evil and perverse. The film which later revived the subgenre, Night of the Living Dead (1968), incidentally presented themes surrounding race in America by casting Duane Jones, a Black actor, as the lead. Whether accidentally or actively, horror films demonstrate societal issues by who or what is chosen to incite fear, and how this choice is represented visually and narratively.

== History ==
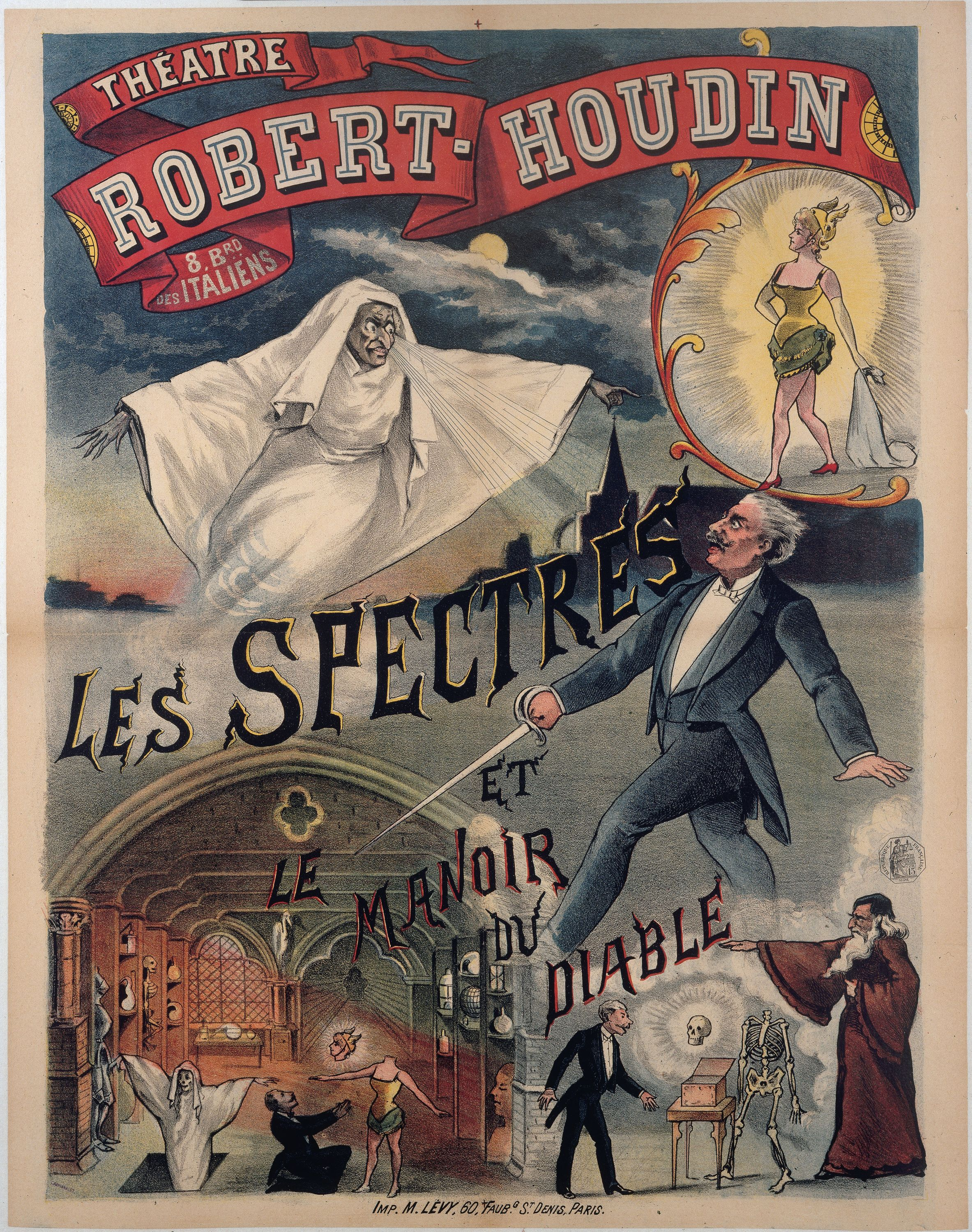
Poster for Le Manoir du diable (1896), sometimes described as the first horror film

The history of horror films was described by author Siegbert Solomon Prawer as difficult to read along a linear path, with the genre changing through the decades, based on the state of cinema, audience tastes and contemporary world events.

Films before the 1930s, such as early German expressionist cinema and trick films, have been retrospectively described as horror films, since the genre did not become codified until the release of Dracula (1931). Dracula was a box office success, leading Universal and several other American film studios to develop and popularise horror films well into the 1940s. By the 1950s, horror was often made with science fiction themes, and towards the end of the decade horror was a more common genre of international productions.

The 1960s saw further developments, with material based on contemporary works instead of classic literature. The release of films such as Psycho, Black Sunday and Night of the Living Dead led to an increase in violence and erotic scenes within the genre. The 1970s would expand on these themes with films that would delve into gorier pictures, as well as films that were near or direct pornographic hybrids. Genre cycles in this era include the natural horror film, and the rise of slasher films which expanded in the early 1980s. Towards the 1990s, postmodernism entered horror, while some of the biggest hits of the decade included films from Japan such as the successful Ring (1998).

In the 21st century, streaming media popularised horror trends. These trends included torture porn influenced by the success of Saw; films using a "found footage" technique; and independent productions such as Get Out, Hereditary, and the Insidious series which were box office hits.

In discussing narrative trends in horror, scholar Isabel Pinedo draws on the book Monsters and Mad Scientists: A Cultural History of the Horror Movie (1989) to map the development of the Anglo-American horror genre. She points out that early synchronized sound, as well as post-war period films, present threats to social order as external, while human agency (largely male) prevails. The focus is on the monster's acts of violence and the characters' failed attempts at resistance, ending with male experts using violence or knowledge to defeat the monster and restore social order. Pinedo presents the category of postmodern horror. She summarizes the narrative structure as indicating the prevalence of internal threats to social order by using a combination of monstrous violence and ineffectual human resistance with open endings. These open endings may be as follows: the monster triumphs as in Henry: Portrait of a Serial Killer (1990); the monster is defeated but only temporarily as in Halloween (1978); or there is an ambiguous outcome as in Night of the Living Dead (1968), The Texas Chainsaw Massacre (1974), The Thing (1982), and Nightmare on Elm Street (1984).

== Sub-genres of horror film ==
Horror is a malleable genre, and it can often be altered to accommodate other genres such as science fiction, which makes some films difficult to categorize.

=== Lovecraftian horror ===
Named after American author H. P. Lovecraft (1890–1937), this sub-genre of horror films include themes of cosmic dread, forbidden and dangerous knowledge, madness, non-human influences on humanity, religion and superstition, fate and inevitability, and the risks associated with scientific discoveries.

=== Body horror ===
A genre that emerged in the 1970s, body horror films focus on the process of a bodily transformation. In these films, the body is either engulfed by some larger process or heading towards fragmentation and collapse. The focus can be on apocalyptic implication of an entire society being overtaken, but the focus is generally upon an individual and their sense of identity, primarily them watching their own body change. The earliest appearance of the sub-genre was the work of director David Cronenberg, specifically with early films like Shivers (1975). Mark Jancovich of the University of Manchester declared that the transformation scenes in the genre provoke fear and repulsion, but also pleasure and excitement such as in The Thing (1982) and The Fly (1986).

=== Christmas horror ===
Christmas horror is a film subgenre that emerged in the 1970s with films such as Whoever Slew Auntie Roo? (1971) and Silent Night, Bloody Night (1972), which were soon followed by the influential Black Christmas (1974). Defining the Christmas horror genre has been described as challenging, as it has generally been regarded as a sub-genre of the slasher film. Adam Rockoff, in Rue Morgue, noted that the sub-genre sits within a trend of holiday-themed slasher films, alongside films such as My Bloody Valentine (1981) and April Fool's Day (1986). Others take a broader view that Christmas horror is not limited to the slasher genre, noting how it evolved from the English Christmas tradition of telling ghost stories. Christmas in literature has historically included elements of "darkness"—fright, misery, death and decay—tracing its literary antecedents as far back as the biblical account of the Massacre of the Innocents and more recently in works such as E. T. A. Hoffmann's "The Nutcracker and the Mouse King" (1816) and Charles Dickens' A Christmas Carol (1843). Although ghosts have largely been replaced by serial killers, Christmas horror creates an outlet through which to explore "a modern reinvention of the Christmas ghost story".

=== Erotic horror ===
Erotic horror is a subgenre of horror fiction that blends sensual and sexual imagery with horrific themes for the sake of sexual arousal. Erotic horror has had influences on French and American horror cinema. The works of Jean Rollin, such as Le Viol du Vampire and Fascination, are considered quintessential erotic horror films, blending deeply sexual imagery with gore. American cinema has also featured notable erotic horror film franchises, such as Candyman. An example of a British erotic horror film series is Hellraiser. Alien features heavy erotic imagery, with the design of the Xenomorph by H. R. Giger featuring both phallic and vaginal imagery, intended to symbolize patriarchal guilt as well as sex, rape, and pregnancy.

=== Extreme Horror ===
Extreme horror is a subgenre of horror that emerged from early twentieth century theater through shocking performances from Paris, France's Théâtre du Grand‑Guignol. The transition from theater to cinema allowed transgressive acts of uncensored sex, torture, mutilation, and taboo exploitation to reach a wider audience. Notably, the 1970s herald in extreme horror that is frequently cited as the beginning of the film subgenre including Last House on the Left (1972), Salò, or the 120 Days of Sodom (1975), and I Spit on Your Grave (1978). Extreme horror film series, such as Saw (2004) and Hostel (2005), have reached mainstream media with characters' appearances in video games such as Dead by Daylight and the subject of musical lyrics for the band Ice Nine Kills.

=== Folk horror ===
Folk horror uses elements of folklore or other religious and cultural beliefs to instill fear in audiences. Folk horror films have featured rural settings and themes of isolation, religion and nature. Frequently cited examples are Witchfinder General (1968), The Blood on Satan's Claw (1971), The Wicker Man (1973), The Witch (2015), and Midsommar (2019). Local folklore and beliefs have been noted as being prevalent in horror films from the Southeast Asia region, including Thailand and Indonesia.

=== Found footage horror ===
The found footage horror film technique gives the audience a first person view of the events on screen, and presents the footage as being discovered after. Horror films which are framed as being made up of "found-footage" merge the experiences of the audience and characters, which may induce suspense, shock, and bafflement. Alexandra Heller-Nicholas noted that the popularity of sites like YouTube in 2006 sparked a taste for amateur media, leading to the production of further films in the found footage horror genre later in the 2000s including the particularly financially successful Paranormal Activity (2007).

=== Gothic horror ===
In their book Gothic film, Richard J. McRoy and Richard J. Hand stated that "Gothic" can be argued as a very loose subgenre of horror, but argued that "Gothic" as a whole was a style like film noir and not bound to certain cinematic elements like the Western or science fiction film. The term "gothic" is frequently used to describe a stylized approach to showcasing location, desire, and action in film. Contemporary views of the genre associate it with imagery of castles at hilltops and labyrinth like ancestral mansions that are in various states of disrepair. Narratives in these films often focus on an audience's fear and attraction to social change and rebellion. The genre can be applied to films as early as The Haunted Castle (1896), Frankenstein (1910) as well as to more complex iterations such as Park Chan-wook's Stoker (2013) and Jordan Peele's Get Out (2017).

The gothic style is applied to several films throughout the history of the horror film. This includes Universal Pictures' horror films of the 1930s, the revival of gothic horror in the 1950s and 1960s with films from Hammer, Roger Corman's Poe-cycle, and several Italian productions. By the 1970s American and British productions often had vampire films set in a contemporary setting, such as Hammer Films had their Dracula stories set in a modern setting and made other horror material which pushed the erotic content of their vampire films that was initiated by Black Sunday. In the 1980s, the older horror characters of Dracula and Frankenstein's monster rarely appeared, with vampire themed films continued often in the tradition of authors like Anne Rice where vampirism becomes a lifestyle choice rather than plague or curse. Following the release of Francis Ford Coppola's Bram Stoker's Dracula (1992), a small wave of high-budgeted gothic horror romance films were released in the 1990s.

=== Natural horror ===
Also described as "eco-horror", the natural horror film is a subgenre "featuring nature running amok in the form of mutated beasts, carnivorous insects, and normally harmless animals or plants turned into cold-blooded killers." In 1963, Alfred Hitchcock defined a new genre nature taking revenge on humanity with The Birds (1963) that was expanded into a trend into the 1970s. Following the success of Willard (1971), a film about killer rats, 1972 had similar films with Stanley (1972) and an official sequel Ben (1972). Other films followed in suit such as Night of the Lepus (1972), Frogs (1972), Bug (1975), Squirm (1976) and what Muir described as the "turning point" in the genre with Jaws (1975), which became the highest-grossing film at that point and moved the animal attacks genres "towards a less-fantastic route" with less giant animals and more real-life creatures such as Grizzly (1976) and Night Creature (1977), Orca (1977), and Jaws 2 (1978). The film is linked with the environmental movements that became more mainstream in the 1970s and early 1980s such vegetarianism, animal rights movements, and organizations such as Greenpeace. Following Jaws, sharks became the most popular animal of the genre, ranging from similar such as Mako: The Jaws of Death (1976) and Great White (1981) to the Sharknado film series. James Marriott found that the genre had "lost momentum" since the 1970s while the films would still be made towards the turn of the millennium.

=== Psychological horror ===
Bill Gibron of PopMatters declared a mixed definition of the psychological horror film, ranging from definitions of anything that created a sense of disquiet or apprehension to a film where an audience's mind makes up what was not directly displayed visually. Gibron concluded it as a "clouded gray area between all out splatter and a trip through a cinematic dark ride."

=== Religious horror ===
Religious horror is a subgenre of horror film whose common themes are based on religion and focus heavily on supernatural beings, often with demons as the main antagonists that bring a sense of threat. Such films commonly use religious elements, including the crucifix or cross, holy water, the Bible, the rosary, the sign of the cross, the church, and prayer, which are forms of religious symbols and rituals used to depict the use of faith to defeat evil.

=== Slasher film ===
The slasher film is a horror subgenre which involves a killer murdering a group of people (often teenagers), usually by use of bladed tools. In his book on the genre, author Adam Rockoff wrote that these villains represented a "rogue genre" of films that are "tough, problematic, and fiercely individualistic." Following the financial success of Friday the 13th (1980), at least 20 other slasher films appeared in 1980 alone. These films usually revolved around three properties: unique social settings (campgrounds, schools, holidays) and a crime from the past committed (an accidental drowning, infidelity, a scorned lover) and a ready made group of victims (camp counselors, students, wedding parties). The genre was derided by several contemporary film critics of the era such as Ebert, and often were highly profitable in the box office. The release of Scream (1996), led to a brief revival of the slasher films for the 1990s. Other countries imitated the American slasher film revival, such as South Korea's early 2000s cycle with Bloody Beach (2000), Nightmare (2000) and The Record (2000).

=== Splatter film ===
Splatter is a subgenre that depends on violence and gore to display and accentuate a fascination with the theatricality of mutilation and the vulnerability of the human body.

=== Supernatural horror ===
Supernatural horror films, sometimes referred to as paranormal horror films, integrate supernatural elements, such as the afterlife, spirit possession and religion into the horror genre. Since they often focus on undead or non-physical beings, they may create unease in viewers without a visible presence on screen. This may include characters feeling a touch or chill in the air, furniture moving on its own, mysterious sounds, or lights flickering with no apparent cause. Prominent supernatural horror films include Paranormal Activity and The Conjuring.

=== Suburban gothic ===
Suburban gothic is a subgenre of Gothic fiction, art, film and television, focused on anxieties associated with the creation of suburban communities, particularly in the United States and the Western world, from the 1950s and 1960s onwards.

This genre often explores themes of paranoia, conformity, and hidden dangers. Suburban horror films include Halloween (1978), A Nightmare on Elm Street (1984), and The Stepford Wives (1975), all of which use the suburban setting to heighten the tension and fear.

=== Teen horror ===
Teen horror is a horror subgenre that victimizes teenagers while usually promoting strong, anti-conformity teenage leads, appealing to young generations. This subgenre often depicts themes of sex, under-aged drinking, and gore. Horror films aimed a young audience featuring teenage monsters grew popular in the 1950s with several productions from American International Pictures (AIP) and productions of Herman Cohen with I Was a Teenage Werewolf (1957) and I Was a Teenage Frankenstein (1957). This led to later productions like Daughter of Dr. Jekyll (1957) and Frankenstein's Daughter (1958). Teen horror cycle in the 1980s often showcased explicit gore and nudity, with John Kenneth Muir described as cautionary conservative tales where most of the films stated if you partook in such vices such as drugs or sex, your punishment of death would be handed out. Prior to Scream, there were no popular teen horror films in the early 1990s. After the financial success of Scream, teen horror films became increasingly reflexive and self-aware until the end of the 1990s with films like I Know What You Did Last Summer (1997) and non-slasher The Faculty (1998). The genre lost prominence as teen films dealt with threats with more realism in films like Donnie Darko (2001) and Crazy/Beautiful (2001). In her book on the 1990s teen horror cycle, Alexandra West described the general trend of these films is often looked down upon by critics, journals, and fans as being too glossy, trendy, and sleek to be considered worthwhile horror films.

== Regional horror films ==
=== Asian horror films ===
Horror films in Asia have been noted as being inspired by national, cultural or religious folklore, particularly beliefs in ghosts or spirits. In Asian Horror, Andy Richards writes that there is a "widespread and engrained acceptance of supernatural forces" in many Asian cultures, and suggests this is related to animist, pantheist and karmic religious traditions, as in Buddhism and Shintoism. Although Chinese, Japanese, Thai and Korean horror has arguably received the most international attention, horror also makes up a considerable proportion of Cambodian and Malaysian cinema.

=== European horror films ===
Ian Olney described the horror films of Europe were often more erotic and "just plain stranger" than their British and American counter-parts. European horror films (generally referred to as Euro Horror) draw from distinctly European cultural sources, including surrealism, romanticism, decadent tradition, early 20th century pulp-literature, film serials, and erotic comics. In comparison to the narrative logic in American genre films, these films focused on imagery, excessiveness, and the irrational.

Between the mid-1950s and the mid-1980s, European horror films emerged from countries like Italy, Spain and France, and were shown in the United States predominantly at drive-in theatre and grindhouse theaters. As producers and distributors all over the world were interested in horror films, regardless of their origin, changes started occurring in European low-budget filmmaking that allowed for productions in the 1960s and 1970s for horror films from Italy, France, Germany, the United Kingdom and Spain, as well as co-productions between these countries. Several productions, such as those in Italy, were co-productions due to the lack of international stars within the country. European horror films began developing strong cult following since the late 1990s.

=== Oceania ===
==== Australia ====
It is unknown when Australia's cinema first horror title may have been, with thoughts ranging from The Strangler's Grip (1912) to The Face at the Window (1919) while stories featuring ghosts would appear in Guyra Ghost Mystery (1921). By 1913, the more prolific era of Australian cinema ended with production not returning with heavy input of government finance in the 1970s. It took until the 1970s for Australia to develop sound film with television films that eventually received theatrical release with Dead Easy (1970) and Night of Fear (1973). The Cars That Ate Paris (1974) was the first Australian horror production made for theatrical release. 1970s Australian art cinema was funded by state film corporations, who considered them more culturally acceptable than local exploitation films (Ozploitation), which was part of the Australian phenomenon called the cultural cringe. The greater success of genre films like Mad Max (1979), The Last Wave (1977) and Patrick (1978) led to the Australian Film Commission to change its focus to being a more commercial operation. This closed in 1980 as its funding was abused by investors using them as tax avoiding measures. A new development known as the 10BA tax shelter scheme was developed ushering a slew of productions, leading to what Peter Shelley, author of Australian Horror Films, suggested meant "making a profit was more important than making a good film." Shelley called these films derivative of "American films and presenting generic American material". These films included the horror film productions of Antony I. Ginnane. While Australia would have success with international films between the mid-1980s and the 2000s, less than five horror films were produced in the country between 1993 and 2000. It was only after the success of Wolf Creek (2005) that a new generation of filmmakers would continuously make horror genre films in Australia that continued into the 2010s.

==== New Zealand ====
By 2005, New Zealand has produced around 190 feature films, with about 88% of them being made after 1976. New Zealand horror film history was described by Philip Matthews of Stuff as making "po-faced gothic and now we do horror for laughs." Among the earliest known New Zealand horror films productions are Strange Behavior (1981), a co-production with Australia and Death Warmed Up (1984) a single production. Early features such as Melanie Read's Trial Run (1984) where a mother is sent to remote cottage to photograph penguins and finds it habitat to haunted spirits, and Gaylene Preston's Mr. Wrong (1984) purchases a car that is haunted by its previous owner. Other films imitate American slasher and splatter films with Bridge to Nowhere (1986), and the early films of Peter Jackson who combined splatter films with comedy with Bad Taste (1988) and Braindead (1992) which has the largest following of the mentioned films. Film producer Ant Timpson had an influence curating New Zealand horror films, creating the Incredibly Strange Film Festival in the 1990s and producing his own horror films over the 2010s including The ABCs of Death (2012), Deathgasm (2015), and Housebound (2014). Timpson noted the latter horror entries from New Zealand are all humorous films like What We Do in the Shadows (2014) with Jonathan King, director of Black Sheep (2006) and The Tattooist (2007) stating "I'd love to see a genuinely scary New Zealand film but I don't know if New Zealand audiences – or the funding bodies – are keen."

=== North America ===
==== Mexico ====
After the 1931 release of an American-produced Spanish-language version of Dracula by George Melford for the Latin-American market employing Mexican actors, Mexican horror films were produced throughout the 1930s and 1940s, often reflecting on the overarching theme of science vs. religion conflict. Ushered by the release of El vampiro, the Mexploitation horror film era started in 1957, with films characterised by their low production values and camp appeal, often featuring vampires, wrestlers, and Aztec mummies. A key figure in the Mexican horror scene (particularly in Germán Robles-starred vampire films) was producer Abel Salazar. The late 1960s saw the advent of the prominence of Carlos Enrique Taboada as an standout Mexican horror filmmaker, with films such as Hasta el viento tiene miedo (1967), El libro de piedra (1968), Más negro que la noche (1975) or Veneno para las hadas (1984). Mexican horror cinema has been noted for the mashup of classic gothic and romantic themes and characters with autochthonous features of the Mexican culture such as the Ranchería setting, the colonial past or the myth of La Llorona (shared with other Hispanic-American nations).

Horror has proven to be a dependable genre at the Mexican box office in the 21st-century, with Mexico ranking as having the world's largest relative popularity of the genre among viewers (ahead of South Korea), according to a 2016 research.

== Effects on audiences ==
=== Psychological effects ===
In a study done by Uri Hasson et al., brain waves were observed via functional magnetic resonance imaging (fMRI). This study used the inter-subject correlation analysis (ISC) method of determining results. It was shown that audience members tend to focus on certain facets in a particular scene simultaneously and tend to sit as still as possible while watching horror films.

In another study done by John Greene and Glenn Sparks, it was found that the audience tends to experience the excitation transfer process (ETP) which causes a physiological arousal in audience members. The ETP refers to the feelings experienced immediately after an emotion-arousing experience, such as watching a horror film. In this case, audience members' heart rate, blood pressure and respiration all increased while watching films with violence. Audience members with positive feedback regarding the horror film have feelings similar to happiness or joy felt with friends, but intensified. Alternatively, audience members with negative feedback regarding the film would typically feel emotions they would normally associate with negative experiences in their life.

Only about 10% of the American population enjoy the physiological rush felt immediately after watching horror films. The population that does not enjoy horror films could experience emotional fallout similar to that of PTSD if the environment reminds them of particular scenes.

A 2021 study suggested horror films that explore grief can provide psychological benefits to the bereaved, with the genre well suited to representing grief through its genre conventions.

=== Physical effects ===
In a study by Medes et al., prolonged exposure to infrasound and low-frequency noise (<500 Hz) in long durations has an effect on vocal range (i.e. longer exposure tends to form a lower phonation frequency range). Another study by Baliatsas et al. observed that there is a correlation between exposure to infrasound and low-frequency noises and sleep-related problems. Though most horror films keep the audio around 20–30 Hz, the noise can still be unsettling in long durations.

Another technique used in horror films to provoke a response from the audience is cognitive dissonance, which is when someone experiences tension in themselves and is urged to relieve that tension. Dissonance is the clashing of unpleasant or harsh sounds. A study by Prete et al. identified that the ability to recognize dissonance relied on the left hemisphere of the brain, while consonance relied on the right half. There is a stronger preference for consonance; this difference is noticeable even in early stages of life. Previous musical experience also can influence a dislike for dissonance.

Skin conductance responses (SCRs), heart rate (HR), and electromyographic (EMG) responses vary in response to emotional stimuli, showing higher for negative emotions in what is known as the "negative bias." When applied to dissonant music, HR decreases (as a bodily form of adaptation to harsh stimulation), SCR increases, and EMG responses in the face are higher. The typical reactions go through a two-step process of first orienting to the problem (the slowing of HR), then a defensive process (a stronger increase in SCR and an increase in HR). This initial response can sometimes result in a fight-or-flight response, which is the characteristic of dissonance that horror films rely on to frighten and unsettle viewers.

== Reception ==
=== In film criticism ===
Critic Robin Wood was not the first film critic to take the horror film seriously, but his article Return of the Repressed in 1978 helped inaugurate the horror film into academic study as a genre. Wood later stated that he was surprised that his work, as well as the writing of Richard Lippe and Andrew Britton would receive "historic importance" intellectual views of the film genre. William Paul in his book Laughing Screaming comments that "the negative definition of the lower works would have it that they are less subtle than higher genres. More positively, it could be said that they are more direct. Where lower forms are explicit, higher forms tend to operate more by indirection. Because of this indirection the higher forms are often regarded as being more metaphorical, and consequently more resonant, more open to the exegetical analyses of the academic industry."

Steffen Hantke noted that academic criticism about horror cinema had "always operated under duress" noting that challenges in legitimizing its subject, finding "career-minded academics might have always suspected that they were studying something that was ultimately too frivolous, garish, and sensationalistic to warrant serious critical attention".

Some commentary has suggested that horror films have been underrepresented or underappreciated as serious works worthy of film criticism and major films awards. As of 2025, only seven horror films have been nominated for the Academy Award for Best Picture, with The Silence of the Lambs being the sole winner. However, horror films have still won major awards.

Critics have also commented on the representation of women and disability in horror films, as well as the prevalence of racial stereotypes.

=== Censorship ===
Many horror films have been the subject of moral panic, censorship and legal controversy.

In the United Kingdom, film censorship has frequently been applied to horror films. A moral panic over several slasher films in the 1980s led to many of them being banned but released on videotape; the phenomenon became popularly termed "video nasties". Constraints on permitted subject matter in Indonesian films has also influenced Indonesian horror films. In March 2008, China banned all horror films from its market.

In the U.S., the Motion Picture Production Code which was implemented in 1930, set moral guidelines for film content, restraining movies containing controversial themes, graphic violence, explicit sexuality and/or nudity. The gradual abandonment of the Code, and its eventual formal repeal in 1968 (when it was replaced by the MPAA film rating system) offered more freedom to the movie industry.
