= El Monstruo resucitado =

1953 film by Chano Urueta

El Monstruo Resucitado
- Directed by: Chano Urueta
- Written by: Arduino Maiuri (story), Chano Urueta
- Produced by: Sergio Kogan; Abel Salazar
- Starring: Miroslava; Carlos Navarro; José María Linares-Rivas; Fernando Wagner; Alberto Mariscal; Stefan Berne
- Cinematography: Víctor Herrera
- Edited by: Jorge Bustos
- Music by: Raúl Lavista
- Production company: Internacional Cinematográfica
- Distributed by: Azteca Films Inc.
- Release date: 1953
- Running time: 85 minutes
- Country: Mexico
- Language: Spanish

El Monstruo Resucitado (lit. The Revived Monster) is a 1953 Mexican horror film directed by Chano Urueta and starring Miroslava, Carlos Navarro and José María Linares-Rivas.

== Plot ==
A reporter, Nora, investigates the mysterious advertisement placed by Dr. Ling, a plastic surgeon. Ling turns out to be a misshapen creature who, rejected by his peers, has become a mad scientist. He falls in love with Nora, but fearing she will betray him, he resuscitates Ariel, a young man who committed suicide, by transplanting a new brain into him, and orders him to capture Nora so that he can kill her. However, Nora and Ariel fall in love, and Ariel rebels against his master.

== Cast ==
- Miroslava - Nora
- Carlos Navarro - Ariel / Serguei Rostov
- José María Linares-Rivas - Hermann Ling
- Fernando Wagner - Gherásimos
- Alberto Mariscal - Mischa
- Stefan Berne - Crommer

== Production ==
The film was one in a string of films in Mexican cinema that attempted to imitate famous films produced by Universal Studios. El Monstruo Resucitado itself was partially inspired by Universal's Frankenstein, and was one of several films in Mexican cinema that were based on Universal's 1931 film. Another film, Fernando Méndez's 1957 film Ladrón de Cadáveres, was also partially based on Universal Studios' Frankenstein. Other Mexican films based on the Universal horror films included El vampiro, which was based on Universal's Dracula, and was also directed by Méndez. This film brought about the Golden Age of horror and fantasy films in Mexican cinema. El Monstruo resucitado was one of the many films that were spawned by the critical and financial success of Ladrón de Cadáveres and El vampiro.

== Reception ==
The film received mixed to positive reviews upon its release. It has been considered by some to be one of the best horror films in Mexican cinema, with some critics praising its atmosphere Glenn Erickson of DVD Talk.com gave the film a positive review stating that the "camera direction kept pace with the 'theatrical delirium' of the performances by evoking the expressionist angles and lighting of Universal films". Erickson also praised the film's cinematography, atmosphere, art direction, and designs.
