= The Brainiac =

1962 film

El Baron del Terror
- Mexican theatrical release poster
- Directed by: Chano Urueta
- Screenplay by: Federico Curiel; Adolfo López Portillo
- Story by: Federico Curiel; Adolfo López Portillo
- Produced by: Abel Salazar
- Starring: Abel Salazar
- Cinematography: José Ortiz Ramos
- Edited by: Alfredo Rosas Priego
- Music by: Gustavo César Carrión
- Production company: Cinematográfica ABSA
- Distributed by: Alameda Films
- Release date: 9 November 1962
- Running time: 77 minutes
- Country: Mexico
- Language: Spanish

El Baron del Terror (lit. The Baron of Terror; American release title: The Brainiac) is a 1962 Mexican supernatural horror film directed by Chano Urueta, written by Federico Curiel, Adolfo López Portillo and Antonio Orellana, and starring its producer, Abel Salazar.

The main character of the film is a villainous baron. In 1661, he is sentenced to death by the Inquisition and is killed during the passage of a comet. He predicts that he will return at the next passage of the same comet to kill the descendants of his foes. In 1961, the comet returns and brings the resurrected baron back to planet Earth. He has gained the ability to shapeshift into a monster, and he uses his forked tongue to feed on the brains of his victims.

== Plot ==
In Mexico City in 1661, Baron Vitelius d'Estera is condemned by the Inquisition and sentenced to be burned at the stake. As this sentence is carried out, the Baron promises that he will return with the next passage of a comet (visible over the scene of the execution), and slay the descendants of his accusers.

Thus in Mexico City in 1961, the promised comet returns, carrying with it Baron Vitelius, who takes advantage of his considerable abilities as a sorcerer to carry out his threat: he is able to change at will into the hairy monster of the title in order to suck out the brains of his victims with a long forked tongue; furthermore, he has strong hypnotic capabilities and is able to render his enemies motionless or force them to act against their wills.

== Cast ==
- Abel Salazar as Baron Vitelius d'Estera
- Ruben Rojo as Rolando Miranda/Marcos Miranda
- Ariadne Welter as Victoria Contreras
- Luis Aragon as Prof. Milan
- David Silva as the Detective-Inspector
- German Robles as Indelacio Pantoya/Sebastian de Pantoja
- Mauricio Garcés as Forensic surgeon

== Release ==
=== Home video ===
The Brainiac was released on DVD by Alpha Video on July 30, 2002. In 2003, it was released as a double feature with The Witch's Mirror (1962) by Image Entertainment. It was released by Vintage Home Entertainment (VHI) on June 15, 2004 as a part of its "Serial Chillers" multi-film collection. It was released by CasaNegra on August 29, 2006. The film was later released by Synapse Films on November 23, 2009 (although some sources list the film as being released on September 29 of that year). Four years later, it was released by Willette Acquisition Corporation on July 23, 2013. It was last released on November 3, 2017.

== Reception ==
The Brainiac received little attention from critics upon its release.

Jon Condit from Dread Central gave the film a score of 4/5, writing, "Say what you will about the story and its title monster, El Baron Del Terror succeeds in capturing the look and feel of the classic black & white Universal monster movies of the Thirties and Forties that it was clearly influenced by. The whole film has the vibe of a horror film from that era, albeit a totally gonzo film from that era." Dave Sindelar, on his website Fantastic Movie Musings and Ramblings listed the film as his favorite Mexican horror film, also noting that the film was "supremely silly and can’t really be taken seriously". Kevin Nickelson from Classic Horror.com gave the film a positive review, writing "The Brainiac deserves some credit for having a good idea to begin with. Using gothic horror as a platform to tell a story of fanaticism and frigid sexual mores is an intriguing, if not original, concept. It’s just a shame that it gets sandwiched inside a creative and technical mess of a film. Still if you’re into badly dubbed and low budget cinema involving sorcerers, inquisitions, comets, sexually inhibited puritans, and astronomy.”

TV Guide awarded the film three out of five stars, calling it "competent and entertaining, despite the dreadful dubbing and cuts made under (English dubbing producer K. Gordon) Murray's supervision". The reviewer also praised the film's expressionistic cinematography, and monster design. The Terror Trap called the film "hilarious fun thanks to its shameless ability to discard logic behind its pseudo sci fi plot."

The July 2, 2012 episode of RiffTrax featured The Brainiac.

The film has developed a cult following since its cable-network TV appearance and is now considered a cult classic by younger generations.
