= Ariadna Welter =

Mexican actress (1930–1998)

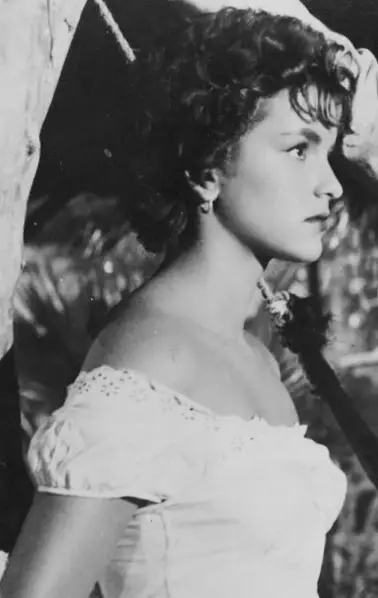
- Ariadna Welter in Sombra verde (1954)
- Born: Ariadna Gloria Welter Vorhauer; June 29, 1930; Mexico City, Mexico
- Died: December 13, 1998 (aged 68); Mexico City, Mexico
- Occupation: Actress
- Years active: 1949–1997
- Spouse: Gustavo Alatriste (m. 1954; div. 1960)
- Family: Linda Christian (sister)

Ariadna Gloria Welter Vorhauer (June 29, 1930 – December 13, 1998), known as Ariadna Welter (also spelled Ariadne Welter), was a Mexican actress. She appeared in the Luis Buñuel film The Criminal Life of Archibaldo de la Cruz (1955). In 1956 she starred in the film El Vampiro, a classic among Mexican horror films.

== Early life and career ==
Welter was born in Mexico City, the daughter of Dutch engineer and Royal Dutch Shell executive Gerardus Jacob Welter and his Mexican-born wife of Spanish, German and French descent Blanca Rosa Vorhauer. Her family moved a great deal during Ariadne's youth, living everywhere from South America and Europe, to the Middle East and Africa. As a result of this nomadic lifestyle, Welter became an accomplished polyglot with the ability to speak fluent French, German, Dutch, Spanish, English, Italian, and even a bit of haphazard Arabic and Russian.

Welter had three siblings, a sister, Blanca Rosa Welter (later known as Linda Christian, 1923–2011), and two brothers, Gerardus Jacob Welter (b. 1924) and Edward Albert Welter (b. 1932). She was wife of the notable Mexican film productor Gustavo Alatriste. Via Linda Christian, her sister, Welter was sister-in-law of actor Tyrone Power and aunt of actors Taryn Power and Romina Power.

In 1955, Ariadne starred in the classic Luis Buñuel film The Criminal Life of Archibaldo de la Cruz. In 1956, she starred along with German Robles in the classic Mexican horror film El Vampiro. During the 1960s, Ariadne was one of the principal Mexican stars of the horror and fiction films. She continued to appear in movies and on telenovelas in Mexico in her later years.

== Filmography (selected) ==
=== Films ===
- Prince of Foxes (1949)
- Untouched (1954)
- La Rebelión de los colgados (1954)
- The Criminal Life of Archibaldo de la Cruz (1955)
- The Vampire (1956)
- Pies de Gato (1957)
- Locos Peligrosos (1957)
- The Vampire's Coffin (1958)
- The Boxer (1958)
- Vacaciones en Acapulco (1961)
- Tres Tristes Tigres (1961)
- Contra Viento y Marea (1962)
- The Devil's Hand (1962)
- El Barón del Terror (1962)
- La Duquesa diabólica (1964)
- Cien gritos de terror (1965)
- Rage (1966)
- Las Mujeres Pantera (1967)
- Esta y l'otra con un solo boleto (1983)

=== Television ===
- Divorciadas (1961)
- Las Momias de Guanajuato (1962)
- Las Modelos (Maniquíes) (1963)
- Cristina Guzmán (1966)
- El extraño retorno de Diana Salazar (1988)
- Maria la del Barrio (1995) as Esperanza Calderón
- Gente bien (1997)
- Mi querída Isabel (1997)

Paloma 1975

== Bibliography ==
- Agrasánchez Jr., Rogelio (2001). Bellezas del cine mexicano/Beauties of Mexican Cinema. Archivo Fílmico Agrasánchez. ISBN 968-5077-11-8.
- Parla, Paul & Mitchell, Charles P. (2000). Screen Sirens Scream!. McFarland. ISBN 0786445874.
