= Norma Lazareno =

Mexican actress (born 1939)

- Born: Norma Marina del Villar Silva; 5 November 1939 (age 86); Alvarado, Veracruz, Mexico
- Occupation: Actress
- Years active: 1954–present
- Spouse: Pablo Ferrel (m. 1978)
- Children: Paulina Lazareno (deceased)

Norma Marina del Villar Silva (born 5 November 1939), known professionally as Norma Lazareno, is a Mexican actress. She established herself as a scream queen through her appearances in Mexican horror films.

Among her most notable works include her roles in the films: Hasta el viento tiene miedo (1968), María Isabel (1968), La horripilante bestia humana (1969), El Libro de piedra (1969), La muñeca perversa (1969), Fray Don Juan (1970), Rapiña (1975) and Las tres tumbas (1980).

== Life and career ==
Around 1978, she married actor and comedian Pablo Ferrel. Together, they had a daughter, Paulina Lazareno, born in 1977. Ferrel and Lazareno separated in the 1980s but never formally divorced. Despite living apart, they shared the responsibility of raising their daughter, who decided to pursue a career as an actress as she grew up.

In 1991, she starred alongside Gonzalo Vega in the political satire La señora presidenta; the production was a huge success and ran for seven years, concluding in 1998. However, amidst the success she enjoyed during that time, her personal life suffered a devastating blow; on June 28, 1997, her daughter Paulina died in a car accident at the age of 19. This tragedy left a deep mark on her, as she was unable to recover for several years, until she finally found solace by immersing herself in her professional life and learned to cope with her grief—without ever forgetting her daughter.

Focusing her career on theater, she remained active in 2025 thanks to Los huevos de mi madre—a musical comedy she had been co-starring in with actor Fernando Botero since 2022—which they performed in various states across Mexico. That same year, Mujer de otro tiempo premiered, a TV movie made in collaboration with the streaming platform Canela TV.

== Filmography ==
=== Film ===
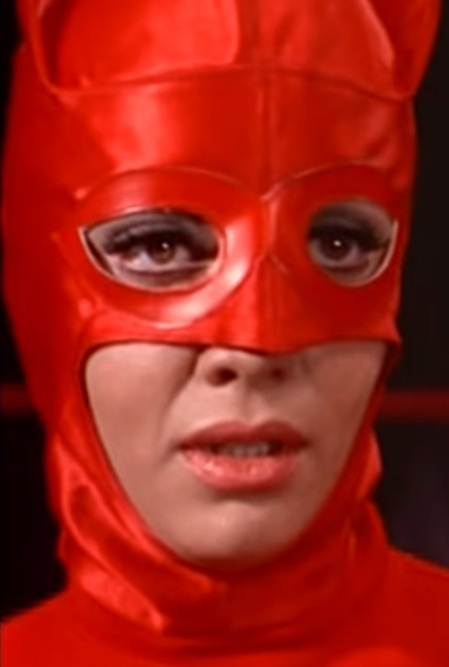
Lazareno in Night of the Bloody Apes (1969)

- Yo también soy Marilyn (2012) - Tia Begoña
- El estudiante (2009) - Alicia
- La hacienda del terror (2005)
- La tregua (2003) - Rosa
- El verdugo (2003)
- Todo contigo (2002) - Doña Carmen
- Religión, la fuerza de la costumbre (2000)
- En las manos de Dios (1996)
- Ataque salvaje (1995)
- Ansiedad asesina (1992) - Begoña Mayorial
- Jóvenes delincuentes (1991)
- Deliciosa sinvergüenza (1990) - Madre superiora
- Marcados por el destino (1990) - Gloria
- El pozo del diablo (1990)
- Señoritas a disgusto (1989) - María
- Me llaman violencia (1989)
- Entre picudos te veas (1989)
- Pero sigo siendo el rey (1988)
- Para que dure no se apure (1988)
- El último triunfo (1988) - Doña Juanita
- El tráiler asesino (1986)
- Gavilán o paloma (1985)
- Los pepenadores de acá (1985) - Rutila
- El escuadrón de la muerte (1985) - Señora Balbuena
- Territorio sin ley (1984)
- Niño pobre, niño rico (1983) - Laura
- Lazos de sangre (1983)
- La fuga de Carrasco (1983)
- Terror en los barrios (1983) - Gabriela Narváez
- Las musiqueras (1983) - Adriana
- Vividores de mujeres (1982) - Osbelia
- La sangre de nuestra raza (1982) - Norma
- Al cabo que ni quería (1982)
- La guerra es un buen negocio (1982) - Celia Vidal
- Ojo por ojo (1981)
- Mojado de nacimiento (1981)
- La jorobada (1981)
- California Dancing Club (1981)
- La casa prohibida (1981)
- Barrio de campeones (1981)
- Las tres tumbas (1980)
- El charro del misterio (1980)
- El secuestro de los cien millones (1979)
- De Cocula es el mariachi (1978)
- Terremoto en Guatemala (1978)
- Deportados (1977)
- El alegre divorciado (1976)
- El compadre más padre (1976)
- Supervivientes de los Andes (1976)
- Rapiña (1975)
- El Cristo de los milagros (1975)
- El desconocido (1974)
- Mulato (1974)
- La corona de un campeón (1974)
- El tigre de Santa Julia (1974)
- Uno para la horca (1974)
- Pobre, pero honrada! (1973)
- El juez de la soga (1973)
- La satánica (1973)
- El sargento Pérez (1973)
- Eva y Darío (1973)
- Los ángeles de la tarde (1972)
- Los perturbados (1972)
- Tampico (1972)
- Triángulo (1972)
- Chico Ramos (1971)
- Mama Dolores (1971)
- La casa del farol rojo (1971)
- Para servir a usted (1971)
- Liberación (1971)
- La venganza de las mujeres vampiro (1970)
- ¡Ahí madre! (1970)
- Fallaste corazón (1970)
- Quinto patio (1970)
- Las chicas malas del padre Méndez (1970)
- Fray Don Juan (1970)
- El amor de María Isabel (1970)
- La trinchera (1969)
- Trampas de amor (1969)
- El amor y esas cosas (1969)
- Las infieles (1969)
- Valentin Armienta, el vengador (1969)
- El Yaqui (1969)
- Al rojo vivo (1969)
- La horripilante bestia humana (1969)
- La muñeca perversa (1969)
- Las pecadoras (1968)
- El libro de piedra (1968)
- La endemoniada (1968)
- Vagabundo en la lluvia (1968)
- Hasta el viento tiene miedo (1968)
- María Isabel (1968)
- El centauro Pancho Villa (1967)
- El mundo loco de los jóvenes (1967)
- Don Juan 67 (1967)
- Arrullo de Dios (1967)
- Los caifanes (1967)
- Estrategia matrimonial (1967)
- El norteño (1963)
- Estos años violentos (1962)
- El dolor de pagar la renta (1960)
- La llamada de la muerte (1960)
- Dicen que soy hombre malo (1960)
- Me gustan valentones! (1959)
- Mujeres encantadoras (1958)
- Concurso de belleza (1958)
- La virtud desnuda (1957)
- El campeón ciclista (1957)
- Juventud desenfrenada (1956)
- Maldita ciudad (un drama cómico) (1954)

=== Televisión ===
- La mexicana y el güero (2021) - Doña Crucita Rojas
- Simplemente María (2015-2016) - Olivia Aparicio Vda. de Bazaine
- Gossip Girl Acapulco (2013) - Cecilia 'Ceci' López-Haro
- Libre para amarte (2013) - María Teresa Lascurain
- Estrella2 (2013)
- Porque el amor manda (2012-2013) - Tracy Rodríguez
- Como dice el dicho (2011-2015) - Leonor / Alicia / Dalia
- La rosa de Guadalupe (2008-2013) - Esperanza / Catita / Rosario / Laila
- Hasta que el dinero nos separe (2009-2010) - Rosario Álvarez del Castillo
- Destilando amor (2007) - Nuria Toledo de Duarte
- Niña amada mía (2003) - Judith Alcázar de Rincón del Valle
- ¡Vivan los niños! (2002-2003) - Adelina
- Carita de ángel (2000-2001)
- Por tu amor (1999) - Adelaida Zambrano
- Preciosa (1998) - Regina de la Diva
- El secreto de Alejandra (1997-1998) - Paulina
- No tengo madre (1997) - Margarita Malpica
- Mujer, casos de la vida real (1996-2001)
- Cañaveral de pasiones (1996) - Hilda de Cisneros
- Caminos cruzados (1994-1995) - Gigi Dumont
- Valentina (1993-1994) - Alicia de Valdepeñas
- En carne propia (1990-1991) - Gertrudis de Serrano
- Mi pequeña Soledad (1990) - Yolanda Salazar Ballesteros
- Un rostro en mi pasado (1989-1990) - Lina Mabarak
- Nuevo amanecer (1988-1989) - Marissa
- La trampa (1988) - Karin
- Senda de gloria (1987) - Angelina Beloff
- Cómo duele callar (1987) - Mercedes de Cisneros
- Te amo (1984-1985) - Victoria
- Tú eres mi destino (1984) - Mercedes
- Mañana es primavera (1982) - Sonia
- Infamia (1981) - Alma de Andreu
- El árabe (1980) - Zarda
- Al salir el sol (1980) - Amparo
- Caminemos (1980) - Adelina
- La llama de tu amor (1979)
- Los bandidos de Río Frío (1976) - Casilda
- Lo imperdonable (1975) - Sara Fonseca
- La tierra (1974) - Gabriela
- Cartas sin destino (1973)
- Nosotros los pobres (1973) - Yolanda 'La Tísica'
- Las fieras (1972) - Hélène
- Pequeñeces (1971) - Carmen Tagle
- La gata (1970) - Mónica
- Un ángel en el fango (1967)

=== Theater ===
- Extraños en un tren (2016)
- La familia real
- Cómo envejecer con gracia
- Los árboles mueren de pie
- Ciego amor
- Esta monja ¡No!
- Sueña
- Algo pasó (1988-1989)

== Bibliography ==
- Greene, Doyle. Mexploitation Cinema: A Critical History of Mexican Vampire, Wrestler, Ape-Man and Similar Films, 1957–1977. McFarland, 2005.
