= Ponchivisión =

- Country: Mexico
- Broadcast area: Mexico
- Headquarters: Mexico City

Programming
- Language: Spanish
- Picture format: 480i (SDTV)

Ownership
- Owner: Alquimia Producciones
- Key people: Andrés Bustamante

History
- Launched: November 19, 2001; 24 years ago
- Closed: June 30, 2003; 23 years ago

Ponchivisión was a Mexican cable television channel created by comedian Andrés Bustamante. The channel launched in 2001 on Cablevisión and had a brief phase on Sky. Its programming mostly consisted of original content made for the channel, as well as syndicated sitcom reruns.

== History ==
Ponchivisión was announced on November 14, 2001 as an independent channel under the control of Andrés Bustamante. Its launch on Cablevisión was confirmed in the inaugural meeting by the cable company's director Pablo Vásquez. Although the channel was owned by Alquimia Producciones, commercial control was up to Televisa Networks, who planned to launch the channel nationwide on other cable companies. Broadcasts began on November 19, with Bustamante impersonating president Vicente Fox in the opening ceremony. Within a few months on air, Cablevisión's Pablo Vázquez assessed that the channel was promising so far and that the growth of its audience was constant.

On September 30, 2002, Ponchivisión launched on Sky México, but was removed on May 15, 2003, after that, on June 9, 2003, it left Cablevisión, with the producer behind the channel not announcing its closure to the general public, but due to the fact that it closed by means of mutual agreement between both parties as well as its declining ratings. It was replaced by the channel of the stars, delayed by 2 hours

== Programming ==
The channel opened with a high amount of original programming, especially during primetime. Leading the launch line-up was Ponchichou, presented by Bustamante in-character as Ponchito, shown four times a week from 9-9:30pm (with a repeat at 11:30pm-12am and highlights of the week on Saturdays at 9pm), La Poncharia with Andrés Bustamente and Trino Camacho on Fridays at 9pm, La risa muda every day at 7pm, followed at 7:30pm by La TV de ayer, featuring archived footage of routines from characters and comedians such as El loco Valdéz and Mauricio Garcés and La licuadora at 8pm. The channel ran on a five-hour wheel, which was repeated four times (with adjustments) to form a 24-hour schedule.
