= Fray Don Juan =

1970 film by René Cardona Jr.

- Directed by: René Cardona Jr.
- Story by: René Cardona Jr. Fernando Galiana
- Produced by: Alberto López
- Starring: Mauricio Garcés; Lorena Velázquez; Norma Lazareno; Gina Romand; Barbara Angely; Luis Manuel Pelayo
- Cinematography: Álex Phillips Jr.
- Edited by: Alfredo Rosas Priego
- Music by: Gustavo César Carrión
- Production companies: Panamerican Films S.A. Productora Fílmica Real
- Release date: 25 June 1970 (Mexico)
- Running time: 87 minutes
- Country: Mexico
- Language: Spanish

Fray Don Juan ("Friar Don Juan" in English) is a 1970 Mexican sex comedy film directed by René Cardona Jr. and starring Mauricio Garcés in dual roles, one as a priest and the other as a womanizer. It also stars Lorena Velázquez, Norma Lazareno, Gina Romand, Barbara Angely, and Luis Manuel Pelayo. It is one in a series of films that featured Garcés as an upper middle class ladies' man.

== Plot ==
A Dominican friar is wrapped in a tangled plot because he is mistaken for his estranged twin brother, who is a womanizer.

== Cast ==
- Mauricio Garcés as Juan Primero / Juan Segundo
- Lorena Velázquez as Claudia, the Pilot's wife
- Norma Lazareno as Graveyard Lady
- Gina Romand as Caridad la de Camagüey
- Barbara Warren as Supermarket Lady (credited as Barbara Angely)
- Luis Manuel Pelayo as Sócrates, the Butler
- Carlos Agostí as The Pilot
- Susana Salvat as Girl at church
- Eduardo Alcaraz (credited as Eduardo Arcaraz)
- Irlanda Mora as Bank Teller
- Carlos Nieto as The Doctor
- Enrique Pontón
- Alma Thelma (credited as Alma Thelma Domínguez)
- José Chávez
- Miguel Ángel Gómez
