= Las tres tumbas =

1980 Mexican drama film

- Directed by: Alberto Mariscal
- Written by: Roberto González Benavidez; José Loza
- Produced by: Jesús Campos; Arnulfo Delgado; Roberto González Benavidez; Alberto Mariscal
- Starring: Federico Villa; Norma Lazareno; Narciso Busquets
- Cinematography: Mariano García
- Music by: Ernesto Cortázar II
- Production company: Producciones del Rey
- Release date: 30 October 1980 (Mexico)
- Running time: 95 minutes
- Country: Mexico
- Language: Spanish

Las tres tumbas (English: "The Three Tombs") is a 1980 Mexican drama film directed by Alberto Mariscal and starring Federico Villa, Norma Lazareno and Narciso Busquets.

== Plot ==
Two lovers marry despite all objections, shocking the people of their town. After many years, her three children return to the town, and upon arrival they find out that the people there have not yet forgiven their parents and therefore they are not welcome.

== Cast ==
- Federico Villa as Pedro
- Norma Lazareno as Fabiana
- Narciso Busquets as Don Luis
- Freddy Fernández as Febronio
- Lorenzo de Monteclaro as Pedro

== Bibliography ==
- Garza Arredondo, Julián. El viejo Paulino: poética popular de Julián Garza. Fondo Editorial de NL, 2006.
- Díaz López, Marina. Historia de la producción cinematográfica mexicana, 1977-1978, Volumen 1. Universidad de Guadalajara, 2005.
- Amador, María Luisa; Ayala Blanco, Jorge. Cartelera cinematográfica, 1980-1989. UNAM, 2006.
