= Night of the Bloody Apes (film) =

- Mexican release poster
- Directed by: René Cardona
- Written by: René Cardona Jr.; René Cardona
- Produced by: Alfredo Salazar
- Starring: José Elías Moreno; Carlos Lopez Moctezuma; Armando Silvestre; Norma Lazareno; Agustín Martínez Solares; Gerardo Zepeda
- Cinematography: Raúl Martínez Solares
- Edited by: Jorge Bustos
- Music by: Antonio Díaz Conde
- Production company: Cinematográfica Calderón S.A.
- Distributed by: Azteca Films Inc.
- Release date: February 6, 1969 (Mexico)
- Running time: 81 minutes
- Country: Mexico
- Language: Spanish

Night of the Bloody Apes (Spanish: La horripilante bestia humana, lit. 'The Horrible Man-Beast') is a 1969 Mexican horror film directed by René Cardona, from a screenplay co-written with his son René Jr.. It stars José Elías Moreno, Armando Silvestre, Carlos López Moctezuma, and Norma Lazareno. It is also known under the alternate titles Horror y sexo ("Horror and Sex") and Gomar—The Human Gorilla.

== Plot ==
Brilliant scientist Dr. Krallman attempts to cure his son's leukemia by doing a heart transplant, replacing his son's heart with a gorilla's. The result of the operation transforms Krallman's son into a deformed and mutated man-ape hybrid, taking on the characteristics of the organ's donor, who immediately goes on a bloody rampage.

== Cast ==
- José Elías Moreno as Dr. Krallman
- Carlos López Moctezuma as Goyo
- Armando Silvestre as Lt. Arturo Martinez
- Norma Lazareno as Lucy Osorio
- Agustín Martínez Solares as Julio Krallman
  - Gerardo Zepeda as monster Julio
- Javier Rizo as Sgt. Ramon
- Noelia Noel as Redheaded victim
- Gina Morett as Shower victim
- Manuel Dondé as a doctor (uncredited)

== Production ==
The film is a remake of the director's own 1962 film Doctor of Doom (Spanish: Las Luchadoras contra el medico asesino, lit. 'The Wrestling Women vs. the Killer Doctor'), the first in a series of films blending elements of the lucha libre and horror genres. Both films' plots concern a mad scientist who transplants a gorilla's heart into his dying son, saving his life but transforming him into a monstrous, ape-like creature who embarks on a rape and murder spree. But the plot of Night of the Bloody Apes does not have the character of the female wrestler bringing the ape-man to justice — rather, she has a much less pronounced role in the plot.

Shooting took place on-location in Mexico City and at Estudios Churubusco.

The filmmakers shot alternate nude scenes for the film's international release. When it was purchased by American distributor Jerald Intrator, he further added inserts of graphic violence and gore to better suit the film's grindhouse audience, including stock footage of a real heart transplant.

== Release ==
The film was theatrically released in Mexico in 1969, and in 1972 in the United States.

Because of its scenes of rape and violence, the film has been rated C in Mexico, R in Australia and the United States; in the United Kingdom it was rated X before being banned until 1999 and then restricted again to audiences over 18.

=== Home media ===
The film was released on DVD by Film 2000 on July 22, 2002. On April 1 that same year, it was released by Image Entertainment as part of the 4-disc Beauties & Beasts box set. In 2006, it was released twice by BCI as part of a multi-disc set on August 8 and 22. On March 26, 2007, it was released by Redemption. BCI re-released the film on March 4, 2008 as part of the 4-disc Crypt of Terror: Horror from South of the Border movie pack. It was last released by VCI Video on July 15, 2014. In 2021, VCI release the film on a double-set Blu-Ray with Doctor of Doom.

== Reception ==
In a contemporary review, the Monthly Film Bulletin noted that the film "tries to wring some more mileage out of the bizarre but shopworn Mexican device of casting monsters and wrestlers as sparring partners", and that it was brought down by its "stately pace, the endless expressions of paternal devotion, and the script's risible attempts to offer medical explanation and justifications". On a positive note, the review said that the film was "enhanced by Cardona's habit of highlighting dramatic moments by dropping in the odd expressionistically-tinged shot with cavalier disregard for matching photographic textures". TV Guide panned the film, calling it "[a] gross, unbelievably inept offering". Graeme Clark from The Spinning Image gave the film 5 out of 10 stars, writing, "As a curio it is worth seeing, but only for its regular incidents of ridiculousness". Reviewing BCI's double feature release of the film, Ian Jane of DVD Talk gave the film a positive review, calling it "one of the best known Mexican horror films of the era". Concluding his review, Jane wrote, "A completely bizarre mish-mash of wrestling, gore, bad monster make up and mad scientist fun, Night of the Bloody Apes is a blast from start to finish. The effects are shoddy and as fake as fake can be and the make up looks like something out of a high school play but that's all part of the film's low budget charm". Dennis Schwartz from Ozus' World Movie Reviews gave the film a C grade, calling it "inept". Jonathan Rosenbaum of Chicago Reader gave the film a negative review, writing, "Even the tolerant Psychotronic Encyclopedia of Film deems this 'totally tasteless and amateurish,' but gore buffs should be alerted to real open-heart surgery footage."
