= Raúl Meraz =

Mexican actor (1927–1996)

- Born: March 13, 1927; Mexico City, Mexico
- Died: April 20, 1996 (aged 69); Mexico City, Mexico
- Occupation: Actor
- Years active: 1956–1996

Raúl Meraz Estrada (March 13, 1927 – April 20, 1996) was a Mexican actor of film and television.

== Selected filmography ==
- Balajú (1944) - Pueblerino (uncredited)
- The Little House (1950) - Invitado a fiesta
- La fiera (1956) - José Ramos
- El crucifijo de piedra (1956)
- La escondida (1956) - Capitán Romero (uncredited)
- Pensión de artistas (1956) - Luis
- La faraona (1956) - Praxton
- Call Me Bad (1957) - Dr. Alvarez
- Tierra de hombres (1957) - Capitán Mena
- It Happened in Mexico (1958) - Mauricio
- El águila negra vs. los diablos de la pradera (1958) - Don Antonio
- El gran espectáculo (1958)
- Maratón de baile (1958) - Juan Montes
- El hombre que logró ser invisible (1958) - Comandante Flores / Police Chief Charles Ford
- Con el dedo en el gatillo (1958) - Detective privado
- La tumba (1958) - Detective Raúl Marín
- El vengador (1958) - Detective Raúl Marín
- Flor de canela (1959) - Rubén
- Qué noche aquella (1959)
- Gutierritos (1959) - Ortega
- Nacida para amar (1959) - Ricardo
- Stray Bullet (1960) - Enrique
- Mujeres engañadas (1961) - Pedro Barroso
- Un par... a todo dar (1961) - Felipe, comandante de policía
- Pilotos de la muerte (1962) - Julio Benítez
- The Hooded Men from Hell (1962) - Remigio
- La pantera de Monte Escondido (1962) - Julio
- The Extra (1962) - Actor, soldado revolución francesa
- El anónimo (1965)
- El dinamitero (1965) - Detective Raúl Marín
- La Valentina (1966) - Capitán Luis Benítez
- El mexicano (1966)
- La vuelta del Mexicano (1967) - Comisario
- Detectives o ladrones..? (1967)
- Seis días para morir (1967) - Enrique, esposo de Ofelia (uncredited)
- El pistolero desconocido (1967) - Don Pedro Herrera
- Desnudarse y morir (1968)
- La gran aventura (1969)
- La puerta y la mujer del carnicero (1969) - Oficial Federal (segment "La mujer del carnicero")
- Modisto de señoras (1969) - Luigi
- El ojo de vidrio (1969) - Capitán Mendiozábal
- Mujeres de medianoche (1969) - Ramiro
- La captura de Gabino Barrera (1970) - Luis Martínez
- Rubí (1970)
- Los corrompidos (1971) - Jose
- Trampa para una niña (1971)
- Más allá de la violencia (1971)
- Hoy he soñado con Dios (1972) - Don Enrique, productor
- Poor But Honest (1973) - Autoridad pueblo
- La presidenta municipal (1975) - Don Mario Nicanor Cruz
- Chicano (1976)
- Ratas del asfalto (1978) - Samuel Domínguez
- Los hijos del diablo (1978) - Comisario Jacinto
- El cortado (1979)
- Como perros rabiosos (1980)
- Los Ricos También Lloran (1979–1980, TV Series) - Comisario Rivas
- Lagunilla, mi barrio (1981) - Braulio
- Un hombre llamado el diablo (1983) - Nicanor Valencia
- Cemetery of Terror (1985) - Captain Ancira
- Narco terror (1985) - Ramiro Mortera
- Cuna de lobos (1986, TV Series) - Don Carlos Larios
- Muerte de el federal de camiones (1987)
- Ser charro es ser Mexicano (1987)
- Vuelven los pistoleros famosos III (1987)
- La diosa del puerto (1989)
- Por tu maldito amor (1990)
- El aduanal (1990) - Don Rafa
- Infamia (1991)
