= Modisto de señoras =

1969 film by René Cardona Jr.

- Directed by: René Cardona Jr.
- Screenplay by: Fernando Galiana
- Story by: René Cardona Jr. Fernando Galiana
- Produced by: Alberto López
- Starring: Mauricio Garcés; Zulma Faiad; Irma Lozano; Claudia Islas; Enrique Rocha; Carlos López Moctezuma; Patricia Aspíllaga
- Cinematography: José Ortiz Ramos
- Edited by: Alfredo Rosas Priego
- Music by: Gustavo César Carrión; Ernesto Cortázar II
- Production company: Productora Fílmica Real
- Release date: 16 October 1969 (Mexico)
- Running time: 85 minutes
- Country: Mexico
- Language: Spanish

Modisto de señoras ("Ladies' Fashion Designer" or "Fashion Designer for Ladies" in English) is a 1969 Mexican sex comedy film directed by René Cardona Jr., and starring Mauricio Garcés, Zulma Faiad, Irma Lozano, Claudia Islas and Patricia Aspíllaga. It is considered perhaps "the most popular and representative" of the series of films that featured Garcés as an upper middle class ladies' man.

== Plot ==
D'Maurice is a fashion designer who pretends to be effeminate in order to fit into the world of haute couture, and taking advantage of that appearance, D'Maurice, a womanizer, seduces all his female clients while making fun of all their husbands, who confidently believe they leave their wives in good hands, such as Rebeca, the young and beautiful wife of the rich Don Álvaro, a parody of the typical nouveau riche in the high society of Mexico.

Suspecting the deception, his competitors, Perugino, Antoine and Mao, determined to unmask him, hire a detective (who is also effeminate) and a beautiful woman to obtain evidence to ruin D'Maurice. Meanwhile, Magda, a beautiful waitress, falls in love with the gallantry of D'Maurice, while worrying about his sudden swings from extreme manliness to effeminacy. D'Maurice in turn confronts Luigi, a dangerous mobster, by getting involved with his mistress, Doris, a renowned Argentine vedette with no talent other than a voluptuous beauty.

== Cast ==
- Mauricio Garcés as D'Maurice
- Zulma Faiad as Doris Martell
- Irma Lozano as Waitress / Mrs. Mendoza Robles
- Claudia Islas as Rebeca
- Enrique Rocha as Perugimo
- Hugo Goodman as Antoine
- Carlos Nieto as Mao
- Carlos López Moctezuma as Don Alvaro
- Patricia Aspíllaga as Barbara
- Raúl Meraz as Luigi
- Irlanda Mora as Irlanda
- Queta Carrasco (as Enriqueta Carrasco)
- Alma Thelma as Thelma (as Alma Thelma Domínguez)
- Armando Acosta
- Julia Acher
- René Barrera
- Juan Garza
- Queta Lavat as Condesa / Cuquis (uncredited)
- Enrique Pontón as Spy cameraman (uncredited)

== Analysis ==
The film has been noted for featuring male gay characters, and as such has been considered an example of an LGBT-themed Mexican film. José César del Toro noted the symbolism of Garcés's character being stated to be 41 years old, as 41 is a number associated with homosexuality in Mexican popular culture, and Karen Cordero and Iván Acebo Choy in Sin centenario ni bicentenario: revoluciones alternas said that "the actor's charisma and his command of comedy even manage to make [his character's] sexual ambiguity to be seen as pertinent within the plot; ultimately it's just a tool for his conquests."
