= Un ángel en el fango =

Mexican telenovela

- Genre: Telenovela
- Country of origin: Mexico
- Original language: Spanish

Original release
- Network: Telesistema Mexicano
- Release: 1967

Un ángel en el fango, is a Mexican telenovela produced by Televisa and originally transmitted by Telesistema Mexicano.

== Cast ==
- Silvia Derbez
- Magda Guzmán
- Norma Lazareno
- Velia Vegar
- Carlos Navarro
