= Carlos Enrique Taboada =

Mexican film director

Carlos Enrique Taboada Walker (July 18, 1929 - April 15, 1997) was a Mexican screenwriter and director. He is best known for his supernatural horror and suspense films including Hasta el viento tiene miedo, Más negro que la noche, Veneno para las hadas, and El Libro de piedra. He won two Ariel Awards (Mexican film academy awards) for Best Picture and Best Director for his 1984 film Poison for the Fairies.

== Career ==
Carlos Enrique Taboada was the son of the actors Julio Taboada and Aurora Walker. He began his career in 1950 as an scriptwriter and director on Mexican television. In 1954, disappointed by reception of his first screenplay, Taboada retired from screenwriting for five years. This would happen again towards the end of his career, during which time his work began to receive international critical acclaim.

== Filmography ==
=== As screenwriter ===
- Kid Tabaco (1954)
- El pandillero (1959)
- Chucho el Roto
- Aventuras de Chucho el Roto
- La captura de Chucho el Roto (1959)
- La maldición de Nostradamus (1959)
- Nostradamus y el destructor de monstruos (1959)
- Nostradamus, el genio de las tinieblas (1959)
- La sangre de Nostradamus [series with three episodes] (1959)
- El testamento del vampiro [series with three episodes] (1959)
- Los inocentes (1960)
- Tirando a matar (1960)
- Que me maten en tus brazos (1960)
- Orlak, el infierno de Frankestein (1960)
- El malvado Carabel (1960)
- Alma llanera (1965)
- Rubí (1970)

=== As director ===
- La recta final (1964)
- El juicio de Arcadio (1967)
- Hasta el viento tiene miedo (1968)
- El libro de piedra (1969)
- El arte de engañar (1970)
- El deseo en otoño (1970)
- ¿Quién mató al abuelo? (1970)
- El negocio del odio (1970)
- La fuerza inútil (1970)
- Rapiña (1973)
- Más negro que la noche (1975)
- La guerra santa (1977)
- Veneno para las hadas (1984)
