= Mauricio Garcés =

Mexican actor & comedian (1926–1989)

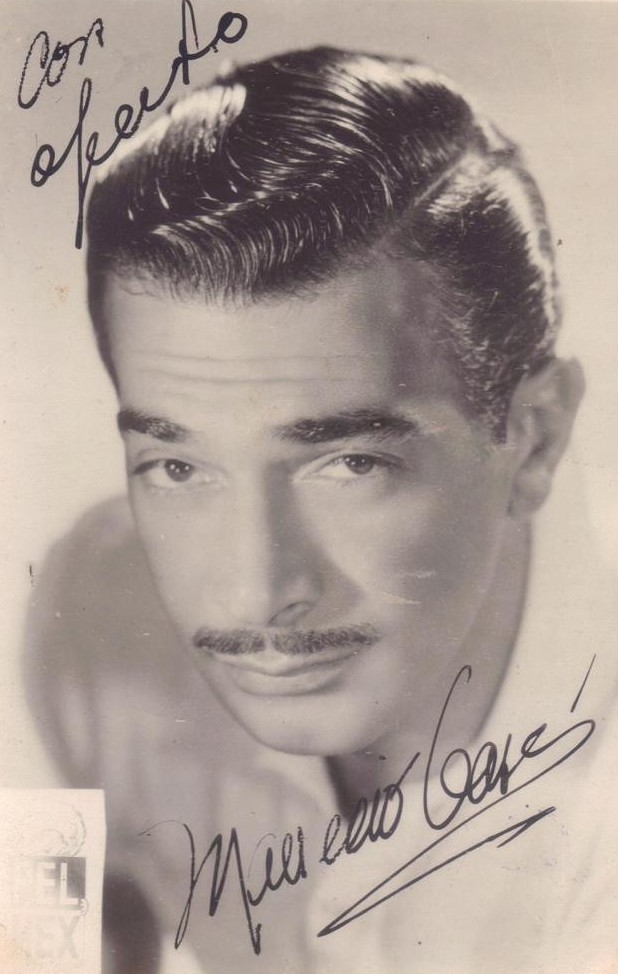
- Garcés, c. 1960s
- Born: Mauricio Feres Yázbek; December 16, 1926; Tampico, Tamaulipas
- Died: February 27, 1989 (age 62); Mexico City
- Occupation: Comedy actor

Mauricio Feres Yázbek (December 16, 1926 – February 27, 1989), known professionally as Mauricio Garces, was a Mexican actor and comedian.

== Personal life and career ==
Garcés was of Lebanese descent and was born in the Mexican port of Tampico, Tamaulipas.

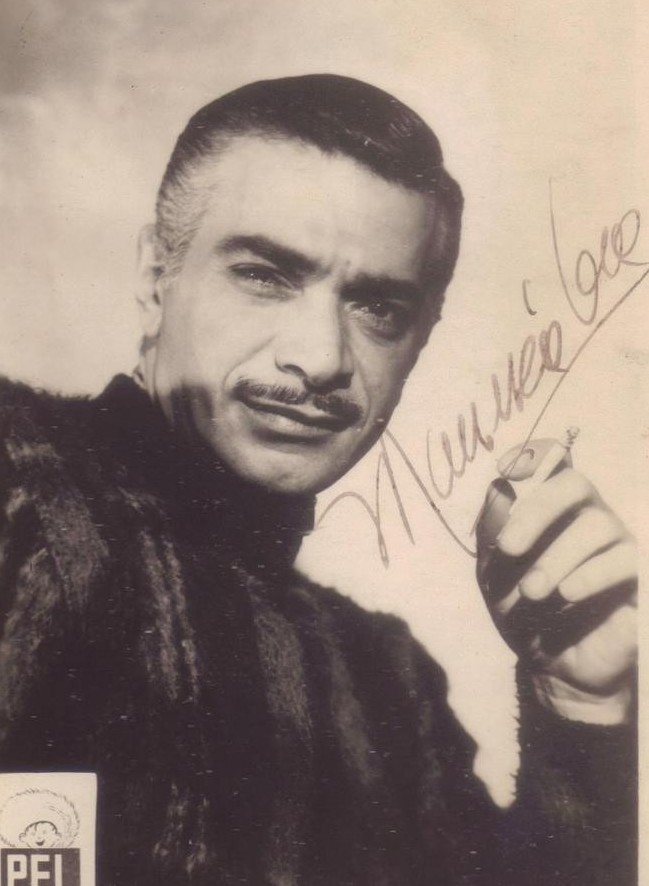
Garcés in a publicity photo, c. 1960s.

With the support of his uncle, the producer José Yázbek, he was included in the production of La Muerte Enamorada ("Death In Love", 1950), a comedy starring Miroslava and Fernando Fernández. After that film, Mauricio adopted the artistic last name "Garcés", believing the letter "G" would bring good luck and turn him into a star at the level of his idols Clark Gable, Gary Cooper and Cary Grant.

His famous image was elegant, worldly, and gallant. This persona aligned with the vision of the producer Angélica Ortiz, mother of the actress Angélica María, who cast Mauricio to star in Don Juan 67 (1966). That marked the first of many films in which he played his alter-ego "Mauricio Galán". Some of the most popular films of the extensive filmography of the "Zorro Plateado" ("The Silver Fox") include: El matrimonio es como el demonio ("Marriage is like the Devil", 1967), Click, fotógrafo de modelos ("Click, photographer of models", 1968), El criado malcriado ("The ill-bred servant", 1968), Departamento de soltero ("Bachelor's apartment", 1969), Fray Don Juan ("Friar Don Juan", 1969) and Modisto de señoras ("Ladies' fashion designer", 1969).

The fact that Garcés lived with his mother and never had any known sentimental relationships led some in Mexico and in greater Latin America to believe that he actually was gay. Garcés, however, always called Silvia Pinal, a Mexican actress, the love of his life. In addition, Garcés had some gambling problems, which led him to lose almost all of his money on betting.

== Filmography ==
Year	Film	English title	Notes
1950	La muerte enamorada	"Death in love"	
1950	El señor gobernador	"Mr. governor"	
1951	Por querer a una mujer	"For loving a woman"	
1951	Radio Patrulla	"Radio patrol"	
1956	Cómicos de la lengua	"Comedians of the variety stage"	
1957	Préstame tu cuerpo	"Loan me your body"	
1958	Cuando ¡Viva Villa! es la muerte	"When Viva Villa! means death"	
1958	Mientras el cuerpo aguante	"As long as the body can stand it"	
1958	El joven del carrito	"The young man with the cart"	
1958	La estrella vacía	"The empty star"	
1959	Los hermanos Diablo	"The Diablo brothers"	
1959	El renegado blanco	"The white renegade"	
1959	Venganza apache	"Apache vengeance"	
1959	Una bala es mi testigo	"A bullet is my witness"	
1959	La Llorona	"The Crying Woman"	
1959	Los resbalosos	"The slippery ones"	
1960	Los fanfarrones	"The braggarts"	
1960	Mujeres engañadas	"Deceived women"	
1960	¿Donde estás, corazón?	"Where are you, darling?"	
1960	El mundo de los vampiros	"The world of vampires"	
1960	Amorcito, corazón	"Sweetheart, darling"	
1960	El Bronco Reynosa	"Reynosa the Untamed"	
1960	El jinete negro	"The black rider"	
1961	Casi casados	"Almost married"	
1961	La cabeza viviente	"The living head"	
1961	Estoy casado. ¡Ja! ¡Ja!	"I'm married. Ha! Ha!"	
1961	Lástima de ropa	"Old clothes"	
1961	El barón del terror	"The baron of terror"	
1963	De color moreno	"Of dark color"	Mex.-Span. co-prod.
1963	México de mi corazón	"Mexico of my heart"	
1963	Napoleoncito	"Little Napoleon"	
1964	Perdóname, mi vida	"Forgive me, my darling"	
1965	Cuernavaca en primavera	"Cuernavaca in springtime"	
1966	Lanza tus penas al viento	"Toss your troubles to the wind"	
1966	Sólo para ti	"Only for you"	
1966	Despedida de casada	"Farewell to marriage"	Mex.-Span. co-prod.
1966	Don Juan 67	"Don Juan 67"	
1966	Bromas, S.A.	"Jokes, Inc."	Mex.-Peruv. co-prod.
1967	El amor y esas cosas	"Love and those things"	
1967	El día de la boda	"The day of the wedding"	
1967	El matrimonio es como el demonio	"Marriage is like the Devil"	
1967	Mujeres, mujeres, mujeres	"Women, women, women"	
1967	Un nuevo modo de amar	"A new way of loving"	
1968	La cama	"The bed"	Mex.-Arg. co-prod.
1968	Click, fotógrafo de modelos	"Click, photographer of models"	
1968	El criado malcriado	"The ill-bred servant"	
1968	El cuerpazo del delito	"The fit body of the crime"	
1968	Las fieras	"The beasts"	
1968	24 horas de placer	"24 hours of pleasure"	Mex.-Ecuad. co-prod.
1968	El aviso inoportuno	"The unwanted help wanted ad	cameo
1968	1969	Departamento de soltero	"Bachelor's apartment"
Espérame en Siberia, vida mía	1969	"Wait for me in Siberia, my darling"	
Fray Don Juan	1969	"Friar Don Juan"	
Modisto de señoras	1969	"Ladies' fashion designer"	
Tápame contigo	1969	"Cover up with me"	
1970	El dinero tiene miedo	"The money is afraid"	Spanish film
1971	El sinvergüenza	"The shameless one"	
1971	Todos los pecados del mundo	"All the sins of the world"	Mex.-Arg. co-prod.
1971	Las tres perfectas casadas	"The three perfect marriages"	Mex.-Span. co-prod.
1971	Vidita negra	"Black darling"	
1971	Hay ángeles sin alas	"There are angels without wings"	cameo
1972	La otra mujer	"The other woman"	
1972	Con amor de muerte	"With love of death"	cameo
1977	No tiene la culpa el indio	"The Indian is not to blame"	
1980	El sátiro	"The satyr"	
1985	Mi fantasma y yo	"My ghost and me"	

== Books about Mauricio Garcés ==
- Pérez Medina, Edmundo (2000). "Galanes y villanos del cine nacional". In Cine Confidencial. Mexico: Mina Editores.
- Pérez Medina, Edmundo (1999). "Estrellas inolvidables del cine mexicano". In Cine Confidencial. Mexico: Mina Editores.
- Varios (1998). "Mauricio Garcés, el eterno seductor". In Somos. Mexico: Editorial Televisa, S. A. de C. V.
- Martinez Martinez Carolina (2014) "Personajes ilustres que con su legado enaltecieron mas a Tampico" en "El Inolvidable y Grandioso Tampico" Mexico Instituto Tamaulipeco para la Cultura y las Artes
