= El vampiro =

- Directed by: Fernando Méndez
- Written by: Ramón Obón (Story and adaptation)
- Produced by: Abel Salazar
- Starring: Abel Salazar; Germán Robles; Ariadne Welter; Carmen Montejo; José Luis Jiménez
- Music by: Gustavo César Carrión
- Release date: 1957
- Running time: 95 minutes
- Country: Mexico
- Language: Spanish

El vampiro (English: The Vampire) is a 1957 Mexican horror film, produced by Abel Salazar and directed by Fernando Méndez from an original screenplay by Ramon Obon, and starring German Robles as Count Lavud, the vampire, Abel Salazar as Dr. Enrique, and Ariadna Welter as Marta. The film, which took influence from the canon of Universal horror, is seen as the beginning of the Mexican horror boom of the 1960s.

A sequel, El ataúd del vampiro (English: The Vampire's Coffin) with the same producer (Salazar), director (Méndez), writer (Obon) and three main actors playing the same roles (Robles, Salazar, and Welter) was released in 1958.

== Plot ==
The film is about Marta, a young woman, who travels to her childhood village, only to find that one of her aunts is dead and another is under the influence of Mr. Duval, who later turns out to be a vampire named Count Karol de Lavud.

== Cast ==
- German Robles as Conde (Count) Karol de Lavud
- Ariadne Welter as Marta
- Abel Salazar as Dr. Enrique
- Carmen Montejo as Eloise
- Jose Luis Jimenez as Ambrosio
- Alicia Montejo
- Mercedes Soler
- Jose Chavez
- Julio Daneri
- Amado Zumaya
- Guillermo Alvarez Bianchi
- Margarito Luna
- Lydia Mellon

== Production ==
It is one of the first movies to show a vampire with elongated canines, a year before Hammer's Horror of Dracula. Although F.W. Murnau's Nosferatu (Max Schrek) had elongated incisors; Tod Browning's Dracula (Bela Lugosi) did not show his teeth at all, while for this film Robles was given visible teeth.

== Release ==
El vampiro was released on DVD in 2006 by CasaNegra/Panik House Entertainment. Both El vampiro and The Vampire's Coffin were released on blu-ray by Powerhouse on October 29, 2024. The blu-ray includes a knowledgeable, jovial commentary track (in Spanish) by the vampire himself, actor German Robles, recorded in 2007 when he was 78 years old as well as interviews with the daughters of producer and actor Abel Salazar.

== See also ==
- Vampire films
