= Blacker Than the Night =

1975 film

Más Negro que la Noche Blacker Than the Night
- DVD cover
- Directed by: Carlos Enrique Taboada
- Written by: Carlos Enrique Taboada
- Starring: Claudia Islas; Lucía Méndez; Susana Dosamantes; Helena Rojo
- Release date: 1975
- Running time: 96 minutes
- Language: Spanish

Más Negro que la Noche (Blacker Than Night) is a 1975 Mexican supernatural horror film, written and directed by Carlos Enrique Taboada.

== Plot ==
The film is about four women that move to a creepy house, inherited by one of them from an old aunt; as a condition, they must take care of the aunt's pet, a black cat. One day, they find the cat dead. Soon after, Aurora's dead body is found hanging upside down in the library by Ofelia due to a heart attack. One night, a half drunken Pilar comes to the house. As she is walking to the steps, she sees the ghost of Susana and falls to her death on the floor breaking her neck. Now Ofelia and Marta are the only ones left in the house. Marta tells Ofelia that Aurora had killed the cat along with her and Pilar, and that she knows that she is next. Ofelia tells her to get away from the house and she runs to open the gate for her boyfriend. They find Marta impaled with several knitting needles on her chest. As a sobbing Ofelia and her boyfriend are leaving the house, the cat's meowing is heard in house.

== Cast ==
- Claudia Islas - Ofelia
- Susana Dosamantes - Aurora
- Lucía Méndez - Marta
- Helena Rojo - Pilar
- Julián Pastor - Pedro
- Alicia Palacios - Sofia
- Pedro Armendáriz Jr. - Roberto
- Tamara Garina - Tia Susana

== Release ==
The film premiered on December 25, 1975, in Mexico and was released in the late 1970s as Blacker Than the Night.

== Remake ==
In 2014, Henry Bedwell directed a remake of the film, this time with an English release title of Darker Than Night.
