= Poison for the Fairies =

1986 film by Carlos Enrique Taboada

- Theatrical release poster
- Spanish: Veneno para las hadas
- Directed by: Carlos Enrique Taboada
- Screenplay by: Carlos Enrique Taboada
- Story by: Carlos Enrique Taboada
- Produced by: Héctor López
- Starring: Ana Patricia Rojo; Elsa María
- Cinematography: Guadalupe García
- Edited by: Carlos Savage
- Music by: Carlos Jiménez Mabarak
- Production companies: Instituto Mexicano de Cinematografía (IMCINE); Sindicato de Trabajadores de la Producción Cinematográfica (STPC)
- Release date: 2 October 1986
- Running time: 90 minutes
- Country: Mexico
- Language: Spanish

Poison for the Fairies (Spanish: Veneno para las hadas) is a 1986 Mexican supernatural horror film written and directed by Carlos Enrique Taboada.

== Plot ==
In 1965, Verónica is a 10-year-old orphan living in a dilapidated villa in Mexico City with her invalid grandmother and her superstitious nanny. The nanny fills Verónica's mind with sinister tales of witches, which she insists are real. Rather than being frightened, Verónica often comforts herself with these stories to feel more powerful than the girls at her parochial school, who mock and ostracize her for her strangeness.

The shy and lonely Flavia, who comes from a wealthy family, arrives as a new student. Verónica envies Flavia's material wealth, as well as her doting parents. Hoping to impress Flavia, Verónica boasts about being an ancient witch disguised as a little girl who can make anything she wants happen. Flavia, who was raised an atheist, is skeptical of Verónica's claims, but also fearful. To convince her, Verónica takes credit for a series of strange coincidences by telling Flavia that she caused them with black magic.

Flavia asks Verónica to cast a spell so that Flavia no longer has to take her hated piano lessons, and Verónica guides Flavia through a magical ritual. During one of Flavia's lessons, the piano teacher, who, unbeknownst to the girls, suffers from a weak heart, collapses and dies, leading Flavia to believe they have killed her. Verónica uses the threat of revealing this secret to further extort Flavia, to the point that Flavia gives Verónica her most cherished possessions and obeys her every command. Revelling in her newfound power, Verónica continues to orchestrate frightening events in order to keep her new friend under her control.

Upon learning that Flavia is going on vacation with her parents to a remote ranch in the Tlaxcala countryside, Verónica demands to be taken along. There, Verónica announces her plan to concoct a poison for the fairies, which are said to be the natural enemies of witches. Flavia grows increasingly terrified at the thought of Verónica's power once the fairies are destroyed, but continues to help Verónica gather ingredients for the "poison", requiring them to sneak out late at night and trespass into restricted areas. When they are finally caught, Flavia confesses to her parents that they are making a poison for the fairies, but Verónica says it is just a game they are playing.

As punishment for telling her parents about the poison, and to reassert her control over Flavia, Verónica persuades Flavia to hand over her beloved pet dog Hippie, claiming that witches will gouge out Flavia's eyes if she does not comply. The following night, the girls go into a barn with Hippie. While Verónica is on the upper level preparing the poison, Flavia is below watching her. When Verónica's shadow transforms into that of a witch stirring a cauldron, Flavia sets fire to a pile of straw with a lit candle, removes the ladder and leaves with Hippie. As Verónica screams for help, Flavia watches the barn burn, smiling wryly.

== Cast ==
- Ana Patricia Rojo as Verónica
- Elsa María Gutiérrez (credited as Elsa María) as Flavia
- Leonor Llausás (credited as Leonor Llauzas) as the witch
- Carmela Stein as nanny
- María Santander as Miss Aragón
- Ernesto Schwartz as Tono
- Rocío Muñoz (credited as Rocío Lazcano) as Señora Ellia
- Blanca Lidia Muñoz (credited as Blanca Lydia Muñoz) as Madame Rickard
- Sergio Bustamante as the voice of Flavia's father
- Lilia Aragón as the voice of Flavia's mother

== Release ==
On 8 October 2022, the film was screened at the Academy Museum of Motion Pictures in Los Angeles on a double bill with The Curse of the Crying Woman (1961), as part of the series "Mexico Maleficarum: Resurrecting 20th Century Mexican Horror Cinema".

=== Home media ===
The film was released on DVD by Desert Mountain Media on 25 January 2005. The company would later re-release the film on 5 June 2007.

Vinegar Syndrome released the film on Blu-ray in Mexican Gothic: The Films of Carlos Enrique Taboada, a two-disc set that also includes Taboada's Más negro que la noche and Rapiña. All three films were newly restored in 4K from their original 35mm camera negatives.

== Reception ==
Veneno para las hadas won the Ariel Award for Best Picture, and Taboada won the Ariel Award for direction.

Reviewing the Vinegar Syndrome set for the Midwest Film Journal, Nick Rogers called the film "almost immediately transfixing", comparing its prologue to the opening of Halloween. He praised Taboada's decision to largely obscure adult faces, which keeps viewers inside the girls' point of view, and the "appropriately remorseless performance" he drew from Ana Patricia Rojo.
