= Hasta el viento tiene miedo =

Hasta el Viento Tiene Miedo
- Directed by: Carlos Enrique Taboada
- Written by: Carlos Enrique Taboada
- Produced by: Jesús Grovas
- Starring: Marga López; Maricruz Olivier; Alicia Bonet; Norma Lazareno
- Cinematography: Agustín Jiménez
- Edited by: José W. Bustos
- Music by: Raúl Lavista; Eduardo Arjona; Galdino Samperio; James L. Fields
- Release date: May 30, 1968
- Running time: 90 minutes
- Language: Spanish

Hasta el viento tiene miedo, known in English as Even the Wind is Afraid and The Wind of Fear, is a 1968 (1967 according to the ITESM) Mexican gothic supernatural horror film, written and directed by Carlos Enrique Taboada. It is considered a cult movie in Mexico and has been credited as having revitalized the Mexican horror genre.

A remake was released in 2007.

== Plot ==
Claudia, a student in a girls' boarding school, wakes up in the middle of the night haunted by the vision of a young woman calling her name and suffers from a panic attack. Oliver, the school doctor, recommends rest, which is backed by the subprincipal Miss Lucía, but the stern principal, Miss Bernarda, dismisses it and orders Claudia back to class.

Claudia and her closest friends, Kitty, Marina, Ivette, Lili, Silvia, and Verónica, notice the lock to the door of the tower in the school grounds is unlocked; Kitty urges them to peer inside, and Claudia claims she knows the place from her visions. Miss Bernarda finds out and punishes them, forcing them to stay in school during holidays and take remedial lessons. Josefina, a prominent and rule-abiding but very shy student, also stays as she has no family to go to. Miss Bernarda questions Claudia, who explains her vision, and Miss Lucía pleads for her to lift the punishment, mentioning an event related to Claudia's tale, but the principal once again dismisses the situation.

The following night, Kitty and Ivette find Claudia sleepwalking to the tower and wake her up; Claudia claims again that someone was calling her. Her friends don't believe her but Claudia says that the girl in her vision is watching them from a window, which the other two spot as well, fleeing in panic and dragging Claudia with them, before joining the rest of the group to tell them what happened.

Miss Bernarda catches Kitty in possession of a photograph of her boyfriend Armando, which she confiscates; that night, Kitty sneaks into the principal's office to retrieve it, and finds a photograph of the girl from Claudia's vision. She confesses her actions to Miss Lucía and asks her about the girl, which the subprincipal identifies as Andrea, a former student, who shows herself to the group soon after, which prompts Miss Lucía to disclose the full story: Andrea attended the same school five years earlier thanks to her single mother's sacrifices, proving a remarkable student, but was also unfairly punished and forbidden by Miss Bernarda, who did not believe her, to go to her mother when the latter was terminally ill; at the news of her death, the girl climbed to the top of the tower and hung herself. Diego, the groundskeeper, tells Miss Lucía that he has seen Andrea, and soon after the subprincipal sees her too. She tells Miss Bernarda and begs her to send the students home; the principal refuses.

Kitty's boyfriend Armando sneaks into the school to visit her, and decides to hide in the tower to remain unseen so they can meet again while everyone is asleep. That night, he spots Andrea, who he assumes to be a student of the school, descending the tower stairs. Claudia, sleepwalking again, reaches the top of the tower and sees Andrea's body hanging from a beam; the shock makes her step back and scream as she falls to the ground to her apparent death, prompting Kitty to send Armando away. Kitty and the staff find her and take her to the school chapel. A regretful Miss Bernarda visits Claudia and prays alongside her, when suddenly Claudia wakes, oblivious to what happened. Dr. Oliver declares her healthy and unharmed, although she acts oddly: her performance in class suddenly rockets, she excels in piano and recalls details from the school prior to their time. Her friends and Miss Lucía are concerned, but Miss Bernarda keeps dismissing the situation until she catches Claudia in the music room out of class time and expels her.

The same night, Miss Lucía goes to Miss Bernarda's room when the power fails. They both hear an eerie wailing; Miss Bernarda, against Miss Lucía’s advice, goes to investigate, finding Claudia at the top of the tower. Andrea's ghost appears; Miss Lucía arrives and finds Miss Bernarda hanging from a beam.

In the aftermath of the events, Miss Lucía is promoted to principal and introduces changes in the school, which turns into a happier place. She and Dr. Oliver discuss Miss Bernarda's death, officially filed as a suicide. Claudia is long back to normal, oblivious to the events right after her fall; although still haunted by her visions, she realizes that Andrea is finally at peace.

== Cast ==
- Marga López as Bernarda, the principal
- Maricruz Olivier as Lucía, the vice principal
- Alicia Bonet as Claudia
- Norma Lazareno as Kitty
- Renata Saydel as Ivette
- Elizabeth Dupeyrón as Josefina
- Rita Sabre Marroquín as Silvia
- Irma Castillón as Marina
- Rafael Llamas as Diego
- Sadi Dupeyrón (credited as Saidi Dupeyron) as Armando
- Pamela Susan Hall as Andrea, the ghost
- Enrique García Álvarez (credited Enrique Garcia) as Doctor Oliver
- Lourdes Baledón as Verónica

== Production ==
=== Development ===
The film marked director Carlos Enrique Taboada's first foray into horror cinema. He wrote the screenplay during his spare time in 1967, originally titling it El viento tiene miedo (The Wind Is Afraid). Taboada lobbied producer Jesús Grovas to let him direct the film; Grovas eventually agreed, on the condition that the title be changed.

=== Filming ===
Principal photography took place in 1967 at locations in Mexico City, including Viveros de Coyoacán Park and the Escuela Superior de Música (Fernández Leal campus).

In a 2018 interview with the newspaper Marca, actress Norma Lazareno recounted how the director conspired with the technical crew to play pranks on the actresses in order to make them nervous during filming—a tactic that, according to her, heightened the tension and the film's scare factor.

== Release ==
Hasta el viento tiene miedo was first released to theaters in Mexico in 1968. It was released to the United States in Blu-ray format in 2020.

== Reception ==
Vulture listed the movie as one of their recommendations for Mexican horror, writing that "What we hear in the tension built through the ambience, the eponymous wind in particular, rings more affecting than what’s actually shown onscreen." ComicsBeat praised the film for its acting, character development, and ambiance.

Marca covered Hasta el viento tiene miedo for the film's 50th anniversary in 2018, noting its cult status. They spoke with actress Norma Lazareno, who stated that the movie was ahead of its time. She further commented that the director conspired with technicians to play tricks on the actresses, so that they would become unnerved during filming, which she credits as enhancing the movie's tension and fear factor.

== Remake ==
A remake, also titled Hasta el viento tiene miedo, was released in 2007. It was directed by Gustavo Moheno and starred Martha Higareda as the film's protagonist, who is committed after a suicide attempt. The remake received negative critical reception while also receiving a more favorable reaction from the general public.

== See also ==
- List of ghost films
