= El Libro de piedra =

- DVD cover
- Directed by: Carlos Enrique Taboada
- Written by: Carlos Enrique Taboada
- Produced by: Adolfo Grovas
- Starring: Marga López; Joaquín Cordero; Norma Lazareno; Aldo Monti
- Cinematography: Ignacio Torres
- Edited by: Carlos Savage
- Music by: Raúl Lavista
- Release date: July 1969
- Running time: 99 min.
- Country: Mexico
- Language: Spanish

El Libro de piedra (The Book of Stone) is a 1969 Mexican supernatural horror film, written and directed by Carlos Enrique Taboada. The film was remade in 2009.

== Plot ==
Julia is hired to be the governess of a young girl, Sylvia who has an emotionally distant father, Eugenio, and a new stepmother, Mariana, since her mother died many years ago. Sylvia insists that she plays with a little boy named Hugo and Julia thinks that it might be a neighbor boy and tells Sylvia that she would like to meet him but Sylvia doesn't want her to meet Hugo. When Julia tells Eugenio about Hugo he explains to her that he isn't real and tells her to go by the lake. Over there Julia finds a large stone statue of a boy holding a book. She wasn't sure why Eugenio wanted her to see the statue to which he replies that that statue is Hugo and that Sylvia is mentally ill. He tells Julia that that statue came with the house and ever since Sylvia has been acting strange.

Sylvia at first doesn't like Julia but as eventually warms up to her after Julia shows her kindness and friendship instead of just calling her crazy. One night while at the dinner table, Julia sees a mysterious figure outside the window and Mariana ask Sylvia if it's her friend Hugo to which she angrily replies that it's not him so she is sent to her room for yelling. The next morning the gardener, Bruno, is upset because someone stepped of the flowers right outside a window. Julia ask him where that window leads to and he tells her that it leads to the dining room. Despite all comments from everyone else in the house, Julia still believes that Hugo is real and that he might be a neighbor boy who comes to play but she is then informed that there are no houses nearby. One day while playing outside, Sylvia tells Julia she wants to take her to an abandoned church nearby. Sylvia gets ahead and when Julia finally catches up she sees Sylvia sitting on the roof of the church claiming she's too scared to get down. Julia goes up to get her and almost falls of the roof after being frightened by a lizard with weird markings on its body. As Sylvia is sitting on the roof waiting for Julia, she begins say to Hugo that she doesn't want to go with him. Julia finally reaches Sylvia and they both head back to the house. On the way back Julia drops her necklace in the lake and is unable to get it but Sylvia tells her not to worry and assures her that Hugo will get it for her.

Back at the house Sylvia's godfather Carlos has come to visit and brought along his new dog named Yago. While the adults are inside the house talking, they hear Sylvia screaming as Yago is on top of her barking at her. She screams for Hugo to help her and when the adults get outside they take Yago away and lock him up. Trying to cheer Sylvia up, Carlos gives her a doll that he brought her. She takes the doll and goes to play. Julia finds in her room the necklace she had dropped in the lake. Julia speaks with Paulina, the cook, who tells her how Sylvia predicts what's gonna happen and she enjoys doing sinister things but Bruno tells Julia that Paulina is just trying to scare her away like Sylvia's last governess was.

The next day Julia is giving Sylvia a geography lesson when Sylvia tells her that Hugo was born in a small town in Austria where everyone was very mean and was killed. When Sylvia's lesson is over Julia tells her to go play and take her new doll with her but Sylvia says that she lost it. While going out with Carlos and Eugenio, Marina is driving and feels a strong pain in her wrist causing her to almost crash the car. That evening the adults hear Yago whimpering in pain and go outside to check him but Julia stays inside and go to check on Sylvia who is already in bed but instead finds her looking out the window. Julia asked Sylvia what she's doing and Sylvia turns around with a smirk on her face and tells Julia that the dog is dead. Unable to explain Yago's death they bury him in the yard the next day. As Julia is brushing Sylvia's hair she talks to her about the importance of going to school and reading but Sylvia says that those things aren't necessary because Hugo has knows everything thanks to a book about black magic. She also tells Julia that Hugo was the son of a black magic sorcerer who before dying learned of a way to revive after a thousand years but he had to make sure that his son would take care of the book until his revival so he made hugo hold the book and turned him into stone. Marina then starts having a strong pain in her leg so Eugenio takes her to their room and call a doctor. While Mariana is getting medical attention Julia tells Eugenio and Carlos what Sylvia said about Hugo but Eugenio still believes she is mentally ill and is repeating something she heard. The doctor tells Eugenio that Mariana's leg is better but now she has a headache. Mariana tells Eugenio that she feels threatened by something sinister and spiritual and that she can't stop thinking of Hugo. While Carlos is painting a portrait of Hugo's statue, the statue disappears frightening him. He runs away and is then frightened by Sylvia who ask him why he was painting Hugo. They walk back to the statue and it is again in its place but Sylvia get angry at Carlos saying he ruined her fun. He goes back to painting and Julia compliments his painting before going to look for Sylvia but instead finds Sylvia's doll hung up in the courtyard with needles stuck in the same parts where Mariana felt the pain. She shows the doll to Carlos and they decide that instead of telling Eugenio they want to talk to Sylvia. In her next lesson Sylvia sees the doll and is frightened by it claiming she doesn't want it anymore.

The next day Erminia, the maid, finds Sylvia drawing a unicursal hexagram out of salt in the courtyard stating that she wants to bring her lizard (the same one that frightened Julia at the church) back to life. The next day Erminia finds that lizard alive in her bedroom and tells Eugenio, Mariana, and Carlos about it. Unsure of what to do, Eugenio agrees to go with Carlos to see his friend who is a professor and knows about that stuff. The professor tells them that the symbol that is one that shouldn't be named but it could only be written with magical elements such as water, fire, salt, or blood. Eugenio doesn't understand why salt would be included in that and he tells them that salt was once thought to be the essence of human life and one example is how Lott's wife turned into a pillar of salt.

That night Mariana hears a noise so goes to check it out and finds Sylvia out of bed and accuses her of trying to scare her and sends her to her room. Then she goes back into her room and while looking in the mirror in the dark, she sees Hugo staring at her. She screams frightened and tells Eugenio the next day that she wants to leave to which he says he rather destroy the statue first. Carlos convinces him to not destroy it but instead sell it to him instead to which Eugenio agrees. Julia asked Carlos to please take the statue when Sylvia is not there so that it won't affect her much. That night Carlos leaves to get everything ready to take the statue and Julia goes to get Sylvia to bed and Sylvia notices that Julia is sad and tells her to not worry because no one is going to take Hugo away, causing Julia to be shocked. While driving, Carlos is frightened after seeing through his rearview mirror that Hugo's ghost is in his car, causing him to lose control of his car, rolling over several times, and catching on fire. The next day police arrived at the house to give the news to Eugenio and asked him if he and another person could go identify the body. Mariana doesn't want to go so Julia goes with Eugenio while Mariana stays to take care of Sylvia. While alone at the house, Sylvia says that Hugo visited her again to which Mariana tells her that she is forbidden of speaking of Hugo again and threatens her. Mariana then wakes up after hearing a noise and finds Sylvia is not in bed so she goes out looking for her by the lake but ends up running into Hugo's ghost instead. After identifying Carlos' body, Eugenio and Julia return home and find all the house employees are awake standing outside. They tell them that they heard a scream and that Mariana and Sylvia are not in the house. They begin searching for them but when they find them, Mariana is dead. Eugenio asked Sylvia what happened and she tells him it was Hugo. Eugenio angrily grabs a sledgehammer and starts hitting the statue. Sylvia begs her father not to do it but he continues first break of the book and then decapitating Hugo's statue, causing Sylvia to faint. A doctor is called and he tells Eugenio that Sylvia is still unconscious and suggests to him that he moves away with Sylvia as soon as possible so she can be far away from anything that reminds her of Hugo. He packs up everything and right before leaving, Julia tells him that she can't find Sylvia anywhere in the house. Thinking she woke up and ran outside, they go looking for her by the lake. There Julia sees that Hugo's head has been moved and the book of stone from the statue is missing. She then looks up at the statue and Eugenio arrives. They both look at the statue with shock after realizing that Sylvia has turned to stone and has now replaced Hugo as the statue guarding the stone book.

== Reception ==
The movie was well received by both the public and critics, being considered one of the best horror films in Mexican cinema and one of the few horror films from the 1960s to actually be scary. Carlos Enrique Taboada, who wrote and directed the movie, received praise for the film being called a masterpiece for the way the movie opted out of the gore style of horror but instead made viewers envision the psychological horror concepts throughout the film making all the jump scares and ghost appearances at the end of the film even more frightening.
