= Germán Robles =

Spanish actor (1929–2015)

- Born: Germán Horacio Robles San Agustín; March 20, 1929; Gijón, Asturias, Spain
- Died: November 21, 2015 (aged 86); Mexico City, Mexico
- Occupation: Actor
- Years active: 1957-2015
- Spouse: Ana María Vásquez

Germán Horacio Robles San Agustín (March 20, 1929 – November 21, 2015) was a Spanish actor who came to Mexico when he was 17, after the Spanish civil war.

In Mexican cinema, he is best known for his amazing characterization of vampires in many cult movies, especially in El Vampiro. He is said to have influenced Christopher Lee's performance in his vampire films. Another well known performance is his dubbing the voice of KITT in the Latin American broadcast of Knight Rider.

== Family ==
Germán was the son of the painter Germán Horacio and the grandchild of Pachín de Melás.

He married Ana María Vásquez.

== Filmography ==
- Lavud the vampire in El Vampiro (1957)
- Dr. Tom Horton Sr. in Dias de Nuestras Vidas (1965-1994) (voiceover for Macdonald Carey)
- Ernst Stavro Blofeld in On Her Majesty's Secret Service (1969) (voiceover for Telly Savalas)
- Henry Blake in M*A*S*H* (1970) (voiceover for Roger Bowen)
- KITT in El Auto Fantástico (1982-1986)
- Dr. Peter Silberman in Terminator (1984) (voiceover for Earl Boen)
- Henry Blake in M*A*S*H* (1984-1987) (voiceover for McLean Stevenson)
- Professor Embry in Robotech: La Película (1986)
- Sherman T. Potter in M*A*S*H* (1987-1995) (voiceover for Harry Morgan)
- Dr. Peter Silberman in Terminator 2: El Juicio Final (1991) (voiceover for Earl Boen)
- Velarmino in Amor de nadie (1990)
- Lionel Racer in Meteoro (1993-1994)
- Lionel Racer in Meteoro: La Película (1993)
- M. Bison in Street Fighter II V (1994-1995)
- Sherman T. Potter in AfterMASH (1995-1997) (voiceover for Harry Morgan)
- Capitan Galimos in Dangaioh (1996)
- Rasputin in Anastasia (1997) (voiceover for Christopher Lloyd)
- Manny in A Bug's Life (1998) (voiceover for Jonathan Harris)
- Neftalí Güemes in Amigos x siempre (2000)
- General Grievous in Star Wars: Clone Wars (2003-2004)
- Dr. Peter Silberman in Terminator 3: La Rebelión de las Máquinas (2003) (voiceover for Earl Boen)
- General Grievous in Star Wars: Episode III – Revenge of the Sith (2005) (voiceover for Matthew Wood)
- Krayzie Bone in Montar Sucio (2006)
- Davy Jones in Piratas del Caribe 2: El Cofre de la Muerte (2006) (voiceover for Bill Nighy)
- Davy Jones in Pirates of the Caribbean: At World's End (2007) (voiceover for Bill Nighy)
- Anton Ego in Ratatouille (2007) (voiceover for Peter O'Toole)
