= The Words (soundtrack) =

The Words (Original Motion Picture Soundtrack)

Film score by Marcelo Zarvos
- Released: September 4, 2012
- Recorded: 2012
- Studio: Rudolfinum, Prague, Czech Republic; CNSO Studios, Prague, Czech Republic
- Genre: Film score
- Length: 47:23
- Label: Lakeshore
- Producer: Marcelo Zarvos

Marcelo Zarvos chronology
Friends With Kids (2011)	The Words (2012)	Won't Back Down (2012)

The Words (Original Motion Picture Soundtrack) is the film score to the 2012 film The Words directed by Brian Klugman and Lee Sternthal, starring Bradley Cooper, Zoe Saldaña, Olivia Wilde, Jeremy Irons, Ben Barnes, Dennis Quaid, and Nora Arnezeder. The film score is composed by Marcelo Zarvos and performed by Czech National Symphony Orchestra and released through Lakeshore Records on September 4, 2012.

== Development ==
The film score is composed by Marcelo Zarvos, who wanted the score to be a unifying element within various time periods, connecting as a thread to the time cuts and flashbacks; he noted his experience with other Hollywoodland and The Good Shepherd (both 2006) considered to be a learning on how to connect the flashbacks and time leaps musically. Initially planned to have the orchestra in the post-World War II era in Paris, Zarvos decided to take the music from the "view from the top" approach as it became the driving force of story and narrates from the perspective of Dennis Quaid's character. Brian and Lee ensured the music had to be operatic, intimate and also tension-building.

The Paris portions became the starting point for composing, where they initially planned to have an orchestra sound. Zarvos balanced it by keeping repetitive ostinato-based music mostly for the present day stories. Having seeking it for music driving the intensity of modern scores and lyrical values of older scores, he composed romantic and repeating orchestral rhythms that oscilated time period, though the directors never discussed about how Rory felt lonely as whether his plagiarism will be found or not, but allowed to capture the suspense musically.

== Reception ==
Allison Loring of Film School Rejects wrote "Zarvos has created a beautiful and layered compilation that gives The Words some real weight and texture, making it just as interesting to listen to as the film is to watch." Kaya Savas of Film.Music.Media wrote "Zarvos injects the characters right into the music's DNA and structures it beautifully".

David Luhrssen of The Shepherd Express wrote "The music by Emmy-nominated Marcelo Zarvos helps to set a somber tone, a note of restraint against the story’s urge to romanticize the writer’s life even as it hints at the lonely inner space of an author’s imagination." The Ithacan wrote "provides a beautiful and haunting atmospheric background to most of the movie".

Ken Hanke of Mountain Xpress called it an "ersatz Philip Glass score by Marcelo Zarvos". Matt Goldberg of Collider called it a "amazing score". Todd McCarthy of The Hollywood Reporter called the score as "emotional", while Rob Nelson of Variety called it "melancholic".

== Track listing ==
No.	Title	Length
1.	"The Author"	1:01
2.	"The Old Man"	4:12
3.	"Rory and Dora's Theme"	1:46
4.	"The Train Station"	2:51
5.	"The Reading"	1:24
6.	"The Writing of The Book"	1:58
7.	"Clay and Daniella's Theme"	1:23
8.	"First Love"	6:03
9.	"The Bookstore"	2:44
10.	"A Young Man In Paris"	2:09
11.	"The Wedding"	1:38
12.	"Rory Touches Greatness"	1:51
13.	"Celia's Theme"	3:21
14.	"The Apology"	1:58
15.	"Haunted"	2:50
16.	"Success"	1:34
17.	"The Window Tears"	4:06
18.	"The Wrong Words"	2:06
19.	"Life or Fiction?"	2:28
Total length:		47:23

== Personnel ==
Credits adapted from liner notes:

- Music composer and producer – Marcelo Zarvos
- Co-producer – Mark Bachle
- Orchestrator – Mark Bachle, Sonny Kompanek
- Conductor – Petr Vronski
- Contractor – Petr Pycha
- Engineer – Gary Chester
- Assistant engineer – Cenda Kotzman, Justin Moshkevich
- Recording and mixing – Gustavo Borner
- Score editor – Michael Bauer
- Executive producer – Brian McNelis, Skip Williamson
- Copyist – Ronaldo Lobo
- Art direction – John Bergin
- A&R – Eric Craig

== Accolades ==
Awards	Category	Recipient	Result	Ref.
International Film Music Critics Association	Best Original Score for a Drama Film	Marcelo Zarvos	Nominated	
