= History of horror films =

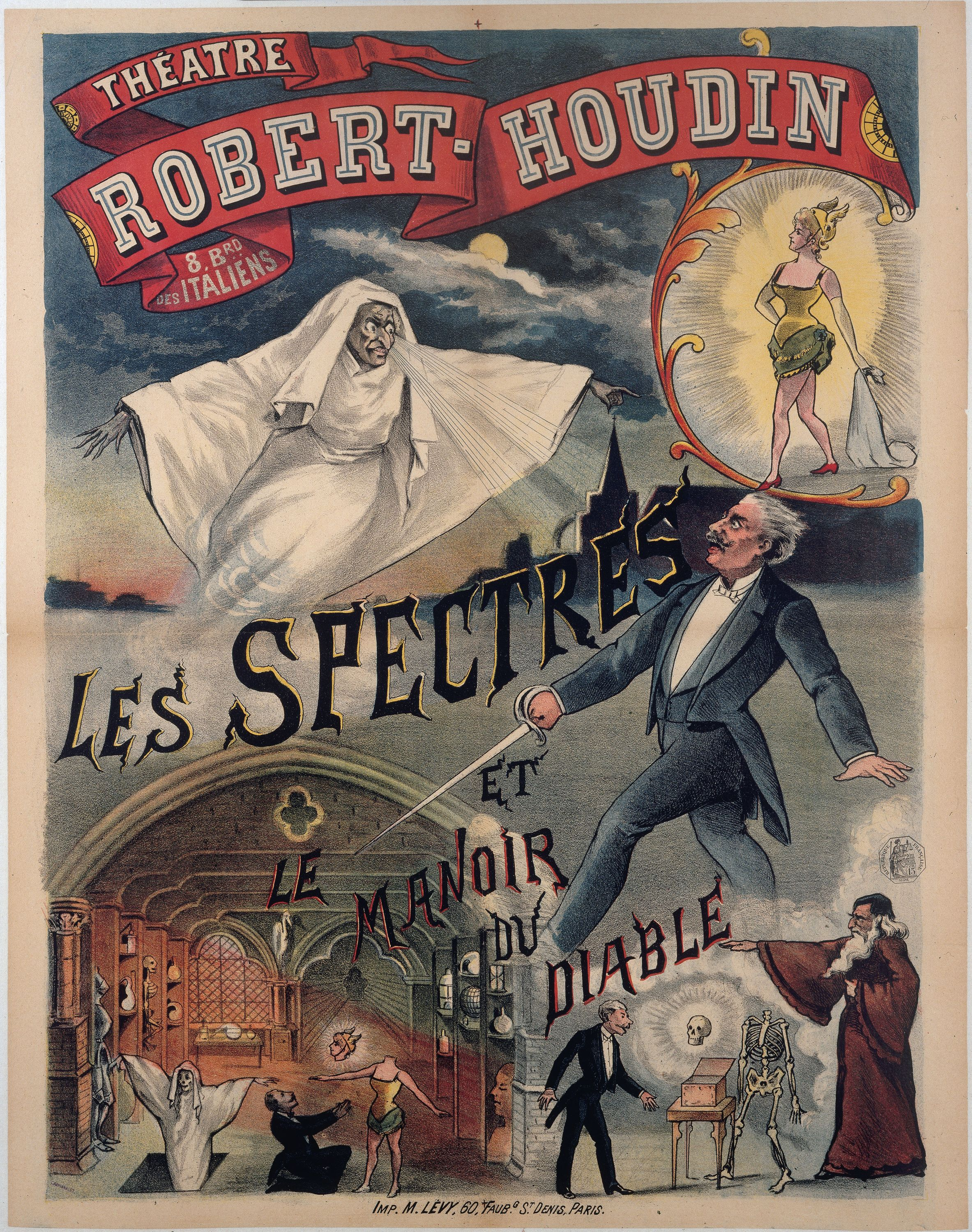
Poster for Le Manoir du diable (1896), sometimes described as the first horror film

The history of horror films was described by author Siegbert Solomon Prawer as difficult to read along a linear path, with the genre changing through the decades, based on the state of cinema, audience tastes and contemporary world events.

Films before the 1930s, such as early German expressionist cinema and trick films, have been retrospectively described as horror films, since the genre did not become codified until the release of Dracula (1931). Dracula was a box office success, leading Universal and several other American film studios to develop and popularise horror films well into the 1940s. By the 1950s, horror was often made with science fiction themes, and towards the end of the decade horror was a more common genre of international productions.

The 1960s saw further developments, with material based on contemporary works instead of classic literature. The release of films such as Psycho, Black Sunday and Night of the Living Dead led to an increase in violence and erotic scenes within the genre. The 1970s would expand on these themes with films that would delve into gorier pictures, as well as films that were near or direct pornographic hybrids. Genre cycles in this era include the natural horror film, and the rise of slasher films which expanded in the early 1980s. Towards the 1990s, postmodernism entered horror, while some of the biggest hits of the decade included films from Japan such as the successful Ring (1998).

In the 21st century, streaming media popularised horror trends. These trends included torture porn influenced by the success of Saw; films using a "found footage" technique; and independent productions such as Get Out, Hereditary, and the Insidious series which were box office hits.

== Background ==
In his book Caligari's Children: The Film as Tale of Terror (1980), author Siegbert Solomon Prawer stated that horror films cannot be interpreted as following a linear historical path. Historians and critics like Carlos Clarens noted that while some film audiences at the time took films made by Tod Browning that starred Bela Lugosi with utmost seriousness, other productions from other countries saw the material set for parody, as children's entertainment or nostalgic recollection. John Kenneth Muir in his books covering the history of horror films through the later decades of the 20th century echoed this statement, stating that horror films mirror the anxieties of "their age and their audience" concluding that "if horror isn't relevant to everyday life... it isn't horrifying".

Prior to the release of Dracula (1931), historian Gary Don Rhodes explained that the idea of the horror film did not exist yet as a codified genre and although critics have used the term "horror" to describe films in reviews prior to Dracula's release, the term has not truly developed by this time as the genre's name. The mystery film genre was in vogue and early information on Dracula being promoted as mystery film was common, despite the novel, play and film's story relying on the supernatural.

== Early influences ==
=== Pre-film ===
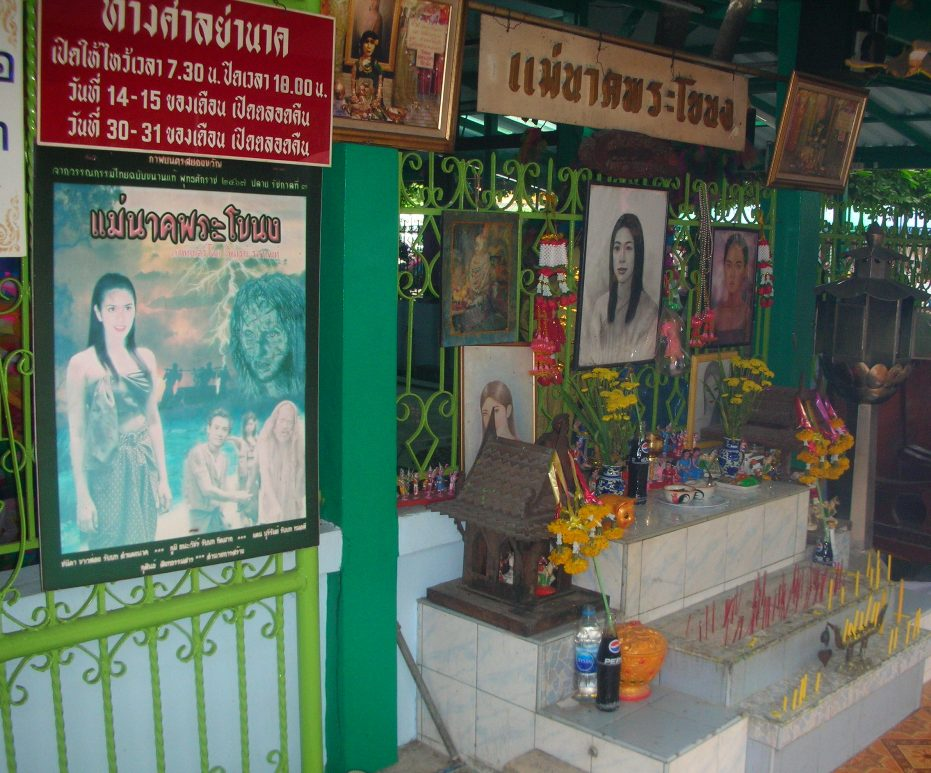
A shrine dedicated to Mae Nak Phra Khanong, a ghost in Thai culture, that has been prominent in many Thai horror films. Legends from folklore of many cultures would go on to influence horror upon the development of film.

Forms of filmmaking that would become film genres were mostly defined in other media before Thomas Edison devised the Kinetograph in the late 1890s. Genres, such as adventure, detective stories, and Westerns were developed as written fiction while musical was a staple to theatre. Author and critic Kim Newman stated that if something was referred to as a horror film in 1890, no one would have understood what it meant as a specific genre, while following up that these types of films were being made but were not categorized as such at the time. Early sources of material that would influence horror films included gruesome or fantastical elements in the Epic of Gilgamesh, where heroes fight monsters, and the Bible, where plagues and apocalypses are discussed. Beliefs in ghosts, demons and the supernatural have long existed in folklore of many cultures and religions, that would go on to be integral elements of horror films. Zombies, for example, originated from Haitian folklore. In Asian Horror, Andy Richards suggests that there is a "widespread and engrained acceptance of supernatural forces" in many Asian cultures, and suggests this is related to animist, pantheist and karmic religious traditions, as in Buddhism and Shintoism; these would go on to strongly influence horror cinema from the region. Classical dramas also include elements later expanded upon by horror films, such as Hamlet, which includes vengeful spectres, exhumed skulls, multiple stabbings and characters succumbing to madness.

Early Gothic fiction such as The Castle of Otranto (1764) and works of Ann Radcliffe dealt with the stories involving seemingly supernatural doings and magnetic yet repulsive villains set in castles, but with their supernatural pretenses often explained in the end. The most famous of these gothic novels was Frankenstein (1818) which would be adapted into several film adaptations. American writer Edgar Allan Poe wrote several stories in the 1830s and 1840s that would be translated to the film screen in the future. These included "The Black Cat", "The Murders in the Rue Morgue", "The Pit and the Pendulum", "The Fall of the House of Usher", and "The Masque of the Red Death". Poe's tales often presented women who were dead, dying or spectral and focus on the obsessions of their male protagonists.

More key horror texts would be produced in the late 1800s and early 1900s than in all centuries preceding it, including: Strange Case of Dr Jekyll and Mr Hyde (1886), The Picture of Dorian Gray (1890), Trilby (1894), The King in Yellow (1895), The Island of Doctor Moreau (1896), Dracula (1897), The Invisible Man (1897), The Turn of the Screw (1898), The Hound of the Baskervilles (1902), Ghost Stories of an Antiquary (1904), and The Phantom of the Opera (1911). As these and many similar novels and short stories were being made, early cinema began in the 1890s. Many of these stories were not specifically focused on the horrific, but lingered in popular culture for their horrific elements and set pieces that would become cinema staples.

=== Early film ===
The House of the Devil (1896)

The first horror film is usually considered to be Le Manoir du diable (1896) by Georges Méliès, with its imagery coming from centuries of books, legend and stage plays, featuring imagery of demons, ghosts, witches and a skeleton and a haunted castle which transforms into the devil. The film has no story, but a series of trick shots and vaudeville acts filmed.

While the word "horror" began to be used as a generic signation in the 19th century, its use was initially rare. In early cinema, trick films were sometimes described with various terms: American Mutoscope and Biograph Company sometimes called their films "fantastic", Selig Polyscope Company called such films "mythical and mysterious" while Vitagraph Studios both "mysterious" and "magical". During the era of Nickelodeon exhibits, exhibitors would use the label "weird", with Frankenstein (1910) being advertised as "weird and wonderful" and Arturo Ambrosio's La maschera tragica (1911) a "weird story".

In the early 20th century as films became popular around the world films were production was so hectic that often told tales were made and then remade within months of each other. Adaptations of the work with Poe were often adopted in France such as Le Puits dett le Pendule (1909) and America with The Sealed Room (1909) The Raven (1912) and The Pit and the Pendulum (1913). Other famous horror characters made their film debut in the era including Frankenstein's monster with Edison's Frankenstein (1910), Life Without Soul (1915), and the Italian production Il mostro di Frankenstein (1921). Several adaptations of other novels like The Picture of Dorian Gray were adapted around the world, including Denmark (Dorian Gray's Portaet (1910)), Russia (Portret Doryana Greya (1915)), Germany (Das Bildnis des Dorian Gray) and Hungary (Az élet királya (1918)). The most adapted horror story was Strange Case of Dr Jekyll and Mr Hyde, which included early adaptations like William Selig's Dr. Jekyll and Mr Hyde (1908). This was followed by several versions, including a British version of the story (The Duality of Man (1910)), a Danish production (Den skæbnesvangre Opfindelse (1910)), and another American film in Dr. Jekyll and Mr. Hyde in 1912. In 1920, three versions were made: J. Charles Haydon's Dr. Jekyll and Mr. Hyde, John S. Robertson's Dr. Jekyll and Mr. Hyde, and F. W. Murnau's Der Januskopf.

== 1920s ==
A film movement that appeared in Germany in the first half of the 1920s labeled the German expressionist film closely resembled the horror film. The term is borrowed from art groups such as Der Blaue Reiter and Der Sturm. These films feature sensationalist titles such as Warning Shadows (1923), The Cabinet of Dr. Caligari (1920) and Secrets of a Soul (1926). German film historian Thomas Elsaesser wrote that what was retained in popular film memory of these films were the characters who resembled bogeymen from children's fairy tales and folk legends. These included characters like the mad Dr. Caligari, Jack the Ripper from Waxworks (1924) and Nosferatu as well as actors like Conrad Veidt, Emil Jannings and Peter Lorre. Director F.W. Murnau, made an adaptation of Dracula with Nosferatu (1922). Newman wrote that this adaptation "stands as the only screen adaptation of Dracula to be primarily interested in horror, from the character's rat-like features and thin body, the film was, even more so than Caligari, "a template for the horror film."

Hollywood would not fully develop horror film stars, but actor and make-up artist Lon Chaney would often portray the monsters in film, such as the ape-man in A Blind Bargain (1922), Quasimodo in The Hunchback of Notre Dame (1923) and Erik in The Phantom of the Opera (1925) and a false vampire in London After Midnight (1927). While horror was provided as an occasional adjective to the films of Chaney such as The Unknown (1927) and West of Zanzibar (1928), the actor was mostly known for the melodramas he made with director Tod Browning.

The term "horror film" was used with various interpretations during this period, such as Evening Star which told readers that "'Horror' Films May Be Barred [in] Transit," a reference to US Senator Thomas Gore's bill that would have prohibit interstate transportation of films that showcased "activities of ex-convicts, bandits, train robbers or other outlaws." In 1928, the Warren Tribune of Pennsylvania reviewed the film Something Always Happens (1928) and compared it The Bat (1926) and The Wizard (1927) and "other films of the same type" in an article titled "Horror Film Thrills Audience at Columbia." Rhodes noted that different descriptions were used for films like The Bat, The Wizard, and The Cat and the Canary (1927), but they were most commonly referred to as mystery films."

== 1930s ==
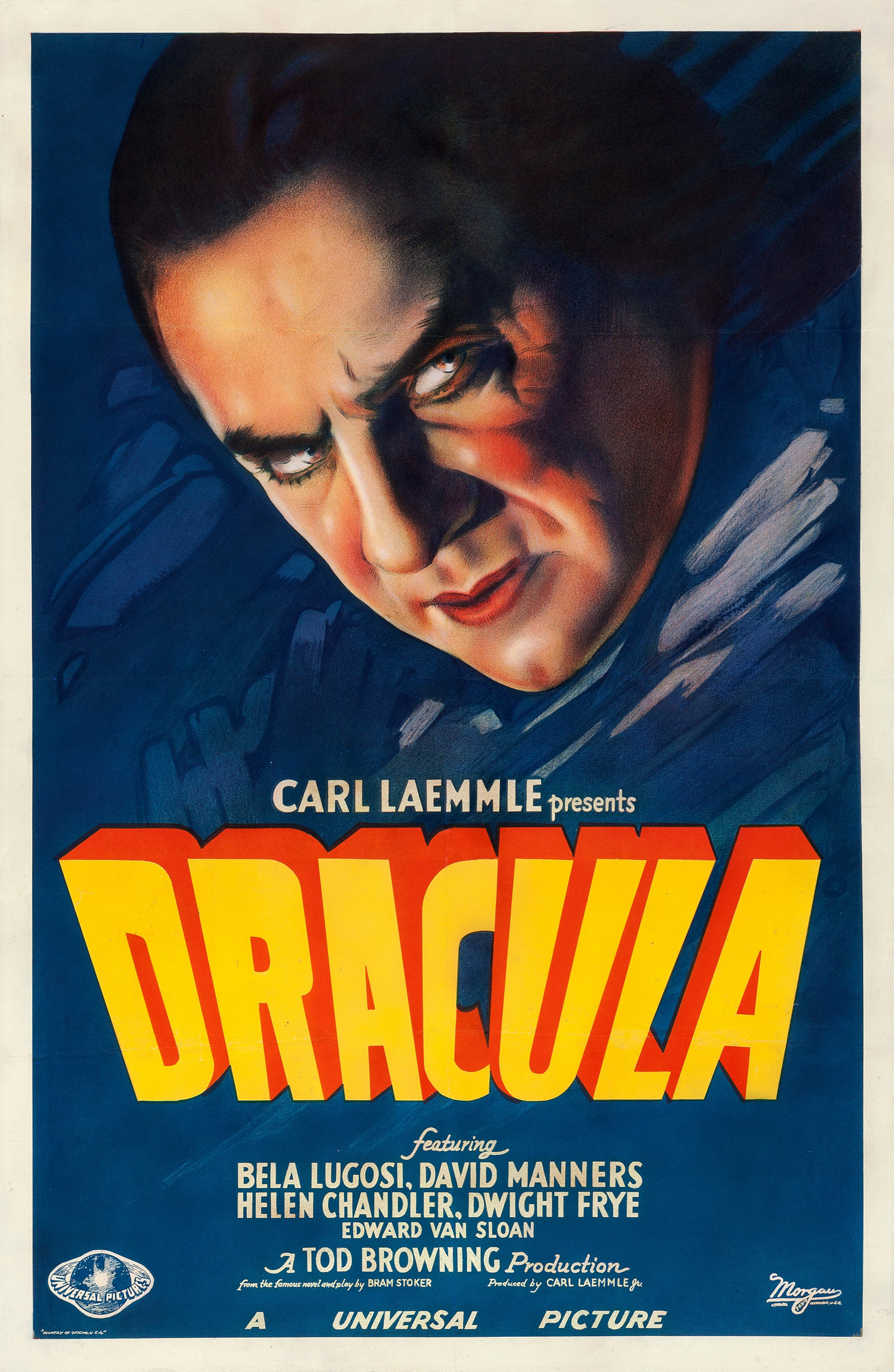
A film poster for Dracula (1931), the film that created a wave of American horror films in the 1930s

In 1924, British producer Hamilton Deane premiered a stage version of Dracula at the Grand Theatre in Derby, England. An American version had premiered on Broadway in 1927 and featuring actor Bela Lugosi as Count Dracula. Rhodes described the play as "taking America storm". In June 1930, Universal Studios officially purchased the rights to both the play and the novel Dracula. Dracula premiered on February 12, 1931, at the Roxy Theatre in New York again with Lugosi in the title role. Contemporary critical response to Dracula was described by Tom Weaver, Michael Brunas and John Brunas, the authors of the book Universal Horrors, as "uniformly positive, some even laudatory" and as "one of the best received critically of any of the Universal horror pictures." Universal was reportedly surprised at the strong box office and critical praise for the film, and forged ahead to make similar productions of Frankenstein (1931) and Murders in the Rue Morgue (1932) which would also star Lugosi for their 1931–1932 season. British filmmaker James Whale directed Frankenstein starring Boris Karloff as the Monster also proved to be a hit for Universal which led to both Dracula and Frankenstein making film stars of Lugosi and Karloff respectively. While Karloff did not have any dialogue in Frankenstein, he was allowed to speak in Universal's The Mummy (1932), a film Newman described as the studio knowing "what they were getting" patterning the film close to the plot of Dracula while historian Gregory W. Mank called the "one-two punch Boris Karloff needed after Frankenstein to boost his stardom. Lugosi and Karloff would star together in several Poe-adaptations in the 1930s, including The Black Cat (1934) and The Raven (1935) and other horror features like The Invisible Ray (1936).

Following the release of Dracula, The Washington Post declared the film's box office success led to a cycle of similar films, while The New York Times stated in a 1936 overview that Dracula and the arrival of sound film began the "real triumph of these spectral thrillers". Other studios began developing their own horror projects with Metro-Goldwyn-Mayer making Dr. Jekyll and Mr. Hyde (1931) and Mad Love (1935) and Paramount Pictures with Island of Lost Souls (1932) and Murders in the Zoo (1933), and Warner Bros. with Doctor X (1932) and Mystery of the Wax Museum (1933). Universal would also follow-up with Whale's The Old Dark House (1932) and The Invisible Man (1933), and Bride of Frankenstein (1935). RKO Pictures had also developed their own monster movie with King Kong (1933) which Newman felt owned more to Arthur Conan Doyle's The Lost World than the Dracula-Frankenstein cycle. Other productions included independents in the United States, such as the Halperin Organization making White Zombie (1933) with Lugosi, whose success led to a series of voo doo related film such as Drums O' Voodoo (1934), Black Moon (1934) and Ouanga. A few productions outside of America were also made such as the British film The Ghoul (1933) starring Karloff and the films of Tod Slaughter.

Many horror films of this era provoked public outcry and censors cut many of the more violent and gruesome scenes from such films as Frankenstein, Island of Lost Souls and The Black Cat. In 1933, the British Board of Film Censors (BBFC) introduced an "H" rating for films labeled "Horrific" for "any films likely to frighten or horrify children under the age of 16 years" In 1935, the President of the BBFC Edward Shortt, wrote "although a separate category has been established for these [horrific] films, I am sorry to learn they are on the increase...I hope that the producers and renters will accept this word of warning, and discourage this type of subject as far as possible." As the United Kingdom was a significant market for Hollywood, American producers listened to Shortt's warning, and the number of Hollywood produced horror films decreased in 1936. A trade paper Variety reported that Universal Studios abandonment of horror films after the release of Dracula's Daughter (1936) was that "European countries, especially England are prejudiced against this type product [sic]." The latter half of the decade had Karloff making low budget films for Monogram Pictures and Lugosi being on welfare. At the end of the decade, a profitable re-release of Dracula and Frankenstein would encourage Universal to produce Son of Frankenstein (1939) featuring both Lugosi and Karloff, starting off a resurgence of the horror film that would continue into the mid-1940s.

== 1940s ==
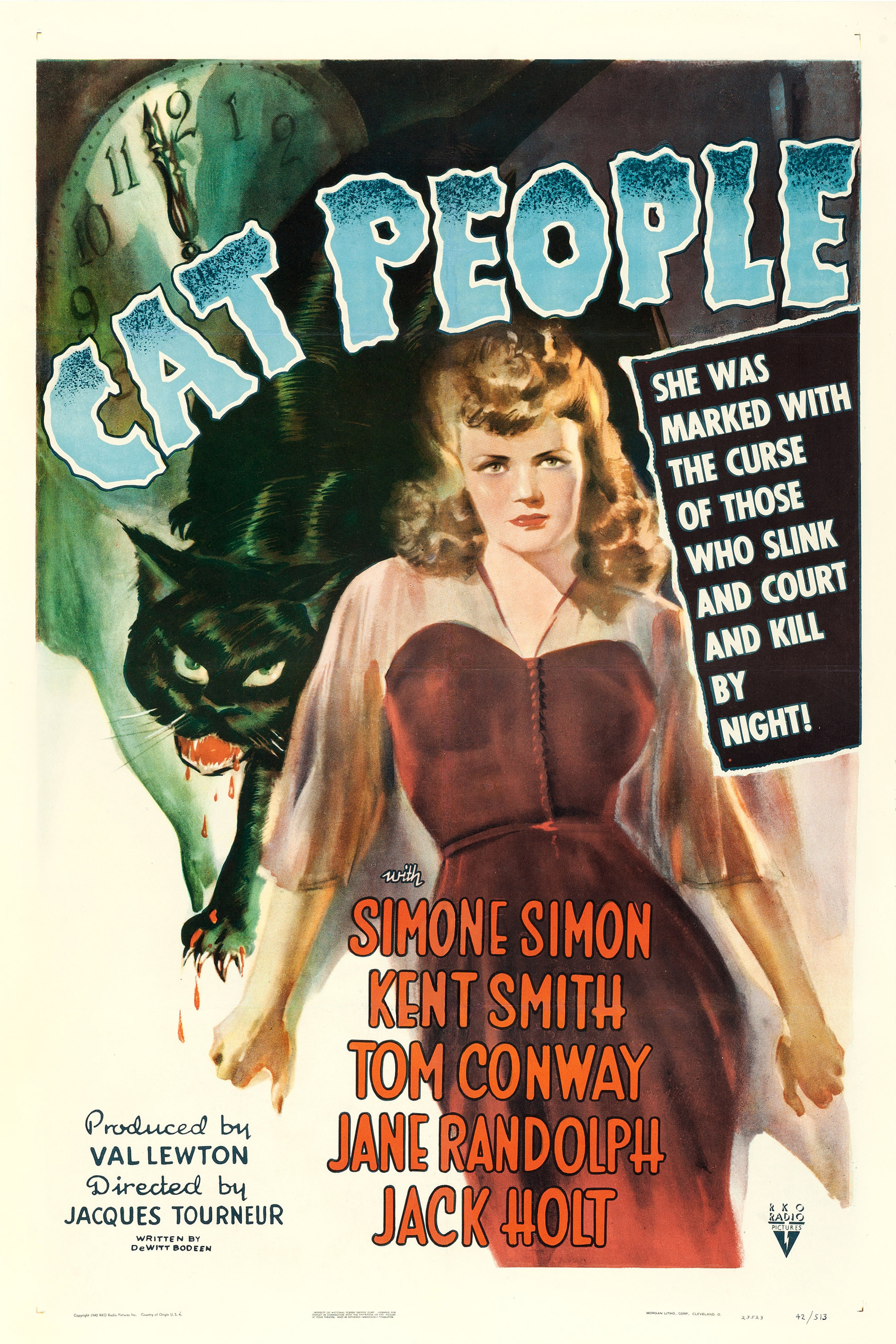
A film poster for Cat People (1942), the first film made by producer Val Lewton that created a new style of horror film

After the success of Son of Frankenstein (1939), Universal's horror films received what author Rick Worland of The Horror Film called "a second wind" and horror films continued to be produced at a feverish pace into the mid-1940s. Universal looked into their 1930s horror properties to develop new follow-ups such as The Invisible Man Returns (1940) and The Mummy's Hand (1941). Man Made Monster (1941) was a pivotal release for Universal's horror output, introducing actor Lon Chaney Jr. Chaney Jr. had received attention for his performance as Lennie Small in Of Mice and Men (1939). Universal saw potential in making Chaney a new star to replace Karloff as he had not distinguished himself in either A or B pictures. Chaney Jr. would become a horror star for the decade showing in the films in The Wolf Man series, portraying the Mummy three times in The Mummy series, Frankenstein's Monster in Ghost of Frankenstein (1942) and as Count Dracula in Son of Dracula (1943). Universal also created new horror series such as the three-picture feature about Paula the Ape-woman, starting with Captive Wild Woman (1943). Universal began crossing their horror franchises in what was colloquially called "monster rally" films. Beginning with Frankenstein Meets the Wolf Man (1943) which had Frankenstein's Monster meet The Wolf Man, further crossovers that included Count Dracula continued in the 1940s with House of Frankenstein (1944) and House of Dracula (1945). B-Picture studios also developed films that imitated the style of Universal's horror output. Karloff worked with Columbia Pictures acting in various films as a "Mad doctor"-type characters starting with The Man They Could Not Hang (1939) while Lugosi worked between Universal and poverty row studios such as Producers Releasing Corporation (PRC) for The Devil Bat (1941) and Monogram for nine features films.

In March 1942, producer Val Lewton ended his working relationship with independent producer David O. Selznick to work for RKO Radio Pictures' Charles Koerner, becoming the head of a new unit created to develop B-movie horror feature films. According to DeWitt Bodeen, the screenwriter of the Lewton's first horror production Cat People (1942), Bodeen watched British and American horror and suspense films that he felt were "typical of what we did not want to do" while director Jacques Tourneur recalled Lewton deciding to not make a "cheap horror movie that the studio expected but something intelligent and in good taste". Newman later described Cat People and the other horror productions by Lewton such as I Walked with a Zombie (1943) and The Seventh Victim (1943) as "polished, doom-haunted, poetic" while film critic Roger Ebert the films Lewton produced in the 1940s were "landmark[s] in American movie history". Several horror films of the 1940s borrowed from Cat People, specifically feature a female character who fears that she has inherited the tendency to turn into a monster or attempt to replicate the shadowy visual style of the film with Jungle Woman (1944), The Soul of a Monster (1944), The Woman Who Came Back (1945), She-Wolf of London (1946), The Cat Creeps (1946), and The Creeper (1948).

In April 1946, the Hollywood Reporter announced that horror films were earning "heavier adult patronage" and were receiving "universal appeal" due to higher budgets and higher standards. Rhodes and Kaffenberger noted the elasticity of the term horror in the article, specifically mentioning films like The Spiral Staircase and Bedlam (1946). The magazine also referred to films such as Alfred Hitchcock's Spellbound and a few foreign films such as The Girl and the Devil (1944) and Dead of Night (1945) under the term. In 1946, Curt Siodmak, the screenwriter of films like The Wolf Man (1941) stated that "When horror enters the gilded gate of top production, it is glorified as a 'psychological thriller.' But a rose by any other name. . . " Between 1947 and 1951, Hollywood made almost no new horror films. Between this period, American studios were re-releasing their back catalog of horror film productions by studios such as Universal and Monogram. Box-office receipts had fallen sharply due to decling theatre attendance leading to the Motion Picture Herald reporting that seven of the eleven major producer-distributors companies including MGM, Paramount, RKO, 20th Century Fox, Universal, Warner Bros. and PRC would re-release their previous seasons films. In the period between 1947 and 1951 at least 25 Bela Lugosi horror films were re-released theatrically.

== 1950s ==
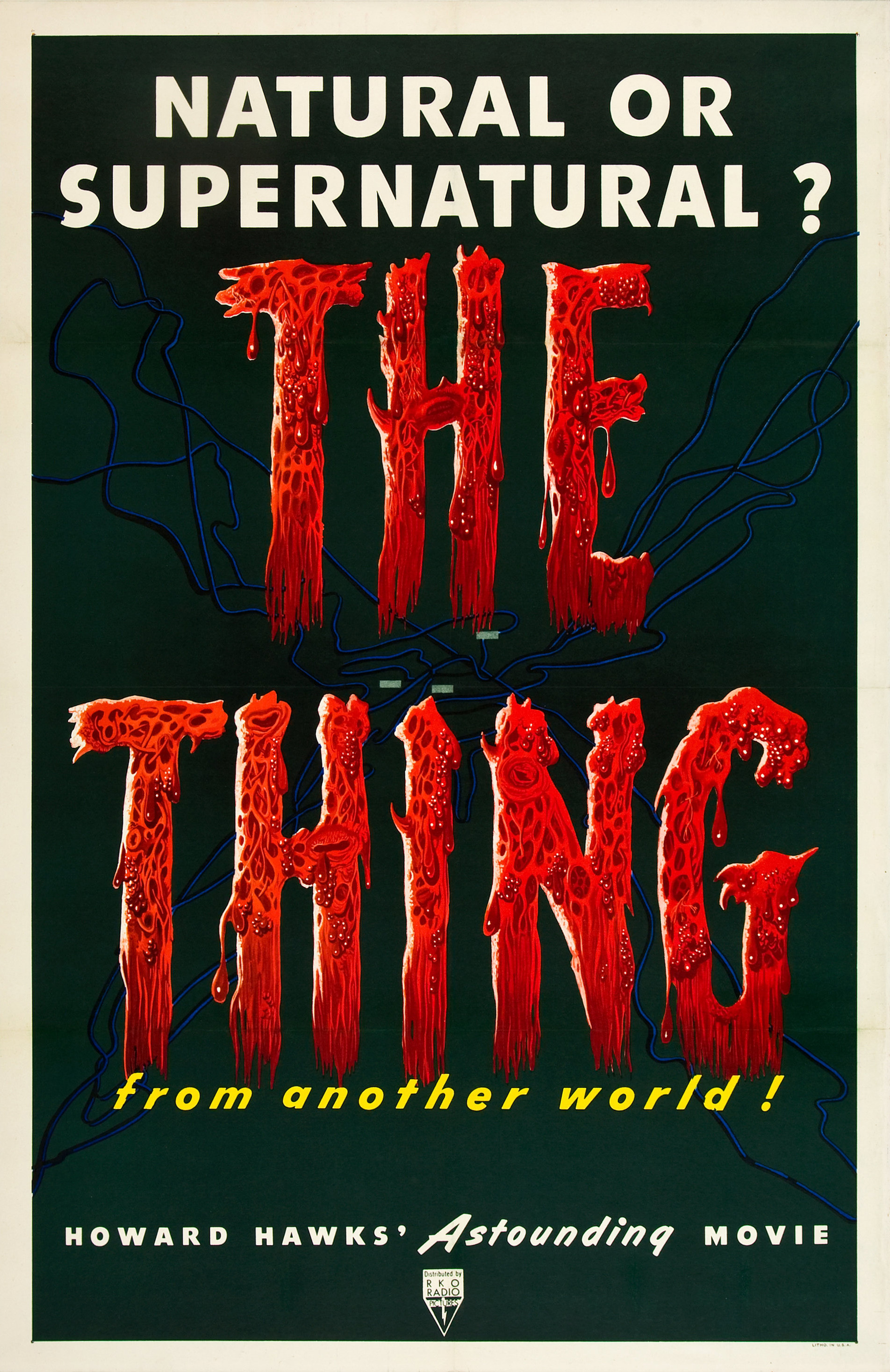
A film poster for The Thing From Another World (1951), a film that moved horror films away from the style established by Universal in the 1930s

While studies suggest that gothic horror had fallen out of fashion between the release of House of Dracula (1945) and The Curse of Frankenstein (1957), small glimpses of the genre appeared in films such as The Son of Dr. Jekyll (1951), The Strange Door (1951), The Black Castle (1952) and House of Wax (1953). Prior to the release of Hammer Film Productions's gothic films, the last gothic horror films of the 1950s often featured aged stars like Bela Lugosi, Lon Chaney Jr., and Boris Karloff in films made by low budget indie film directors like Ed Wood or Reginald LeBorg or producers like Howard W. Koch. Hammer originally began developing American-styled science fiction films in the early 1950s but later branched into horror with their colour films The Curse of Frankenstein and Dracula (1958). These films would birth two horror film stars: Christopher Lee and Peter Cushing. Along with Hammer's more science fiction oriented series Quatermass, both the gothic and science fiction films of Hammer would develop many similar films within the years.

Among the most influential horror films of the 1950s was The Thing From Another World (1951), with Newman stating that countless science fiction horror films of the 1950s would follow in its style, while the film, The Man from Planet X (1951) was still in debt to Universal horror style of filming with a bearded scientist and foggy sets. For five years following the release of The Thing From Another World, nearly every film involving aliens, dinosaurs or radioactive mutants would be dealt with matter-of-fact characters as seen in The Thing From Another World. Even films that adapted for older characters had science fiction leanings such as The Vampire (1957), The Werewolf (1956) and Frankenstein 1970 (1958) being influenced by the atomic inspired monsters of the era. Films with a Strange Case of Dr Jekyll and Mr Hyde theme also appeared with The Neanderthal Man (1953), The Fly (1958), Monster on the Campus (1958) and The Hideous Sun Demon (1958). Smaller trends also included the Universal-International produced the film Cult of the Cobra (1955) which created a brief wave of horror films featuring Pin-up model like mutants such as The Leech Woman (1960) and The Wasp Woman (1959).

Films from the 1950s reflected the filmmaking styles of the era. These included some horror films being shot in 3D, such as The Mad Magician (1954), Phantom of the Rue Morgue (1954), and The Maze (1953). Director William Castle also attracted horror audiences with his gimmick-themed horror films such as The Tingler (1959) and House on Haunted Hill (1959) that involved props and effects happening within the cinema. Horror films aimed a young audience featuring teenage monsters grew popular in the 1950s with several productions from American International Pictures (AIP) and productions of Herman Cohen with I Was a Teenage Werewolf (1957) and I Was a Teenage Frankenstein (1957). This led to later productions like Daughter of Dr. Jekyll (1957) and Frankenstein's Daughter (1958). Horror films also expanded further into international productions in the 1950s such as Mexican production El vampiro (1957). In Italy, Riccardo Freda and Mario Bava developed early Italian horror films with I Vampiri (1957) and Caltiki – The Immortal Monster (1959). Productions also extended into the Philippines (Terror Is a Man (1959)), Germany (The Head (1959) and Horrors of Spider Island (1960)) and France (Eyes Without a Face (1960)).

== 1960s ==
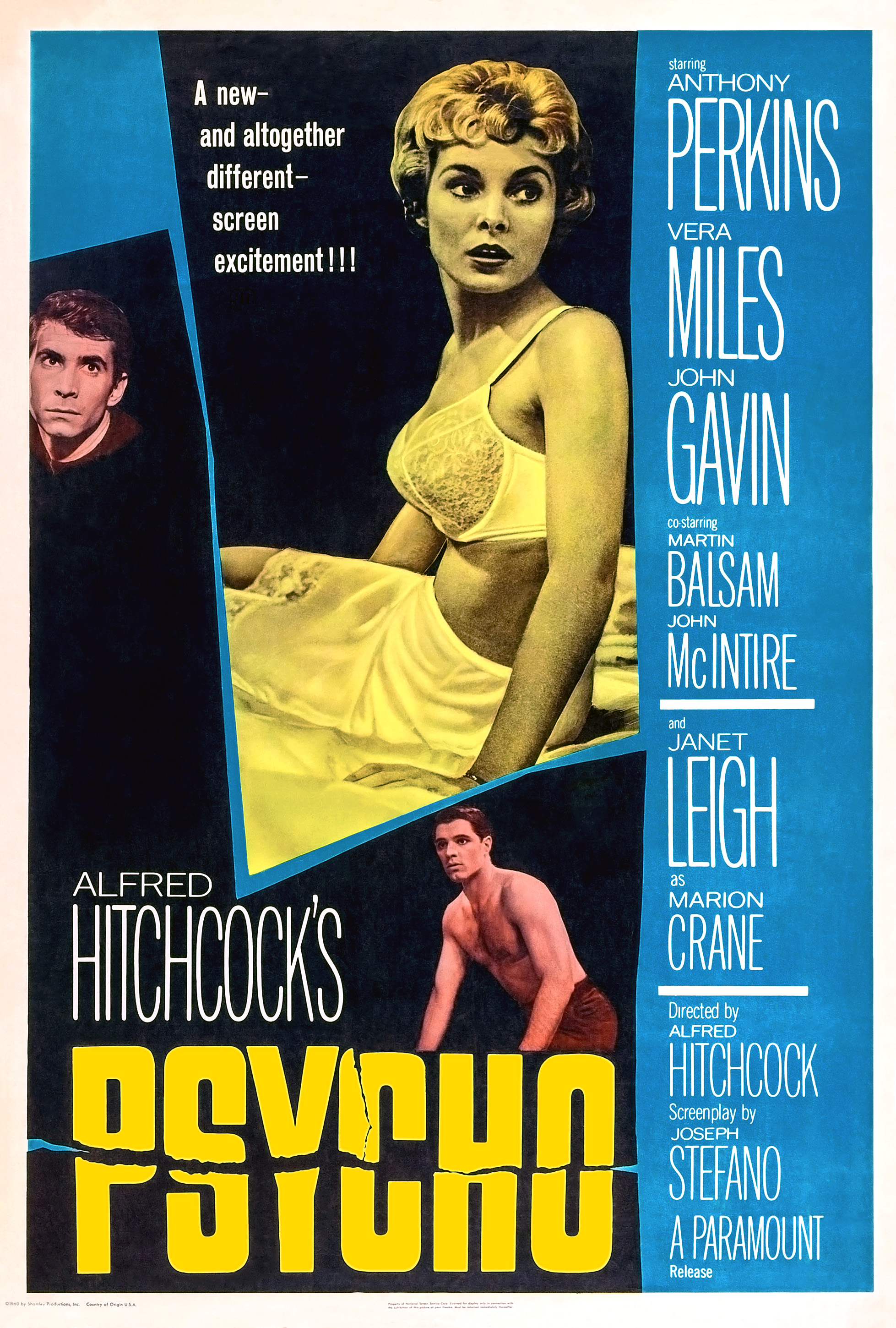
A film poster for Psycho (1960). Along with Black Sunday, the two 1960s films dramatically changed the tone of horror films from the 1960s onward.

Newman said that the horror film changed dramatically in 1960. Specifically, with Alfred Hitchcock's film Psycho (1960) based on the novel by Robert Bloch. Newman declared that the film elevated the idea of a multiple-personality serial killer that set the tone future film that was only touched upon in earlier melodramas and film noirs such as Hangover Square (1945) and While the City Sleeps (1956). The release of Psycho led to similar pictures about the psychosis of characters, including What Ever Happened to Baby Jane? (1962) and the Bloch-scripted Strait-Jacket (1964) by William Castle. The influence of Psycho continued into the 1970s with films ranging from Taste of Fear (1961), Paranoiac (1962), and Pretty Poison (1968). Following Psycho, there was a brief reappearance of what Newman described as "stately, tasteful" horror films such as Jack Clayton's The Innocents (1961) and Robert Wise's The Haunting (1963). Outside America, Japan released films to critical acclaim such as Masaki Kobayashi's Kwaidan (1965) which won international awards including Special Jury Prize at the Cannes Film Festival and was nominated for the Best Foreign Language Film at the Academy Awards. Newman described Roman Polanski's Rosemary's Baby (1968) the other "event" horror film of the 1960s after Psycho. The influence of Rosemary's Baby' story involving satanic themes would not be felt until the 1970s with films like The Exorcist (1973) and The Omen (1976).

Roger Corman convinced AIP to develop two cheap black-and-white horror films, and used the budget of these two films to make the colour film House of Usher (1960). The film created its own cycle of Poe-adaptations by Corman, including The Pit and the Pendulum (1961), Tales of Terror (1962), and The Raven (1963) which provided roles for aging horror stars such as Karloff and Chaney Jr. These films were made to compete with the British colour horror films from Hammer in the United Kingdom featuring their horror stars Cushing and Fisher. Hammer made several films in their Frankenstein series between 1958 and 1973, while still producing one-offs such as The Reptile (1966) and Plague of the Zombies (1966). Competition for Hammer appeared in the mid-1960s in the United Kingdom with Amicus Productions such as Dr. Terror's House of Horrors (1964) and also featured actors Cushing and Lee. Unlike Hammer, Amicus drew from contemporary sources such as Bloch (The Skull (1965) and Torture Garden (1967)) which led to Hammer adapting works by Dennis Wheatley (The Devil Rides Out (1968)).

Mario Bava's Black Sunday (1960) marked an increase in onscreen violence in film. Prior to Bava's film, Fisher's early Hammer films had attempted to push the envelope; The Curse of Frankenstein relied on make-up to depict the horror of the monster, Dracula had its gorier scenes cut by the British Board of Film Censors, and the violence in the backstory of The Hound of the Baskervilles (1959) was conveyed mostly through narration. The violence in Psycho (1960), which was released a week earlier than Black Sunday, was portrayed through suggestion, as its famous "shower scene" made use of fast cutting. Black Sunday, by contrast, depicted violence without suggestion. This level of violence would later be seen in other Italian genre films, such as the Spaghetti Western and the giallo, including Bava's own Blood and Black Lace (1964) and the gialli of Dario Argento and Lucio Fulci. Other independent productions of the 1960s expanded on the gore shown in the films in a genre later described as the splatter film, with films by Herschell Gordon Lewis such as Blood Feast which led to similar minded independent directors making similar works like Andy Milligan and Ted V. Mikels. Newman found that the true breakthrough of these independent films was George A. Romero's Night of the Living Dead (1968) which set a new attitudes for the horror film, one that was suspicious of authority figures, broke taboos of society and was satirical between its more suspenseful set pieces.

Black Sunday's focus on combining eroticism and horror, specifically the eroticism of a tortured body — a trend that other European horror filmmakers like the French Jean Rollin and Spanish Jesús Franco would follow. Franco would make several horror films from the 1960s on, borrowing the plot of Eyes Without a Face (1960) for The Awful Dr. Orloff (1962) while screenwriter and actor Jacinto Molina under the name Paul Naschy began developing Spanish horror films by borrowing characters from Universal properties such as La Marca del Hombre Lobo (1968).

== 1970s ==
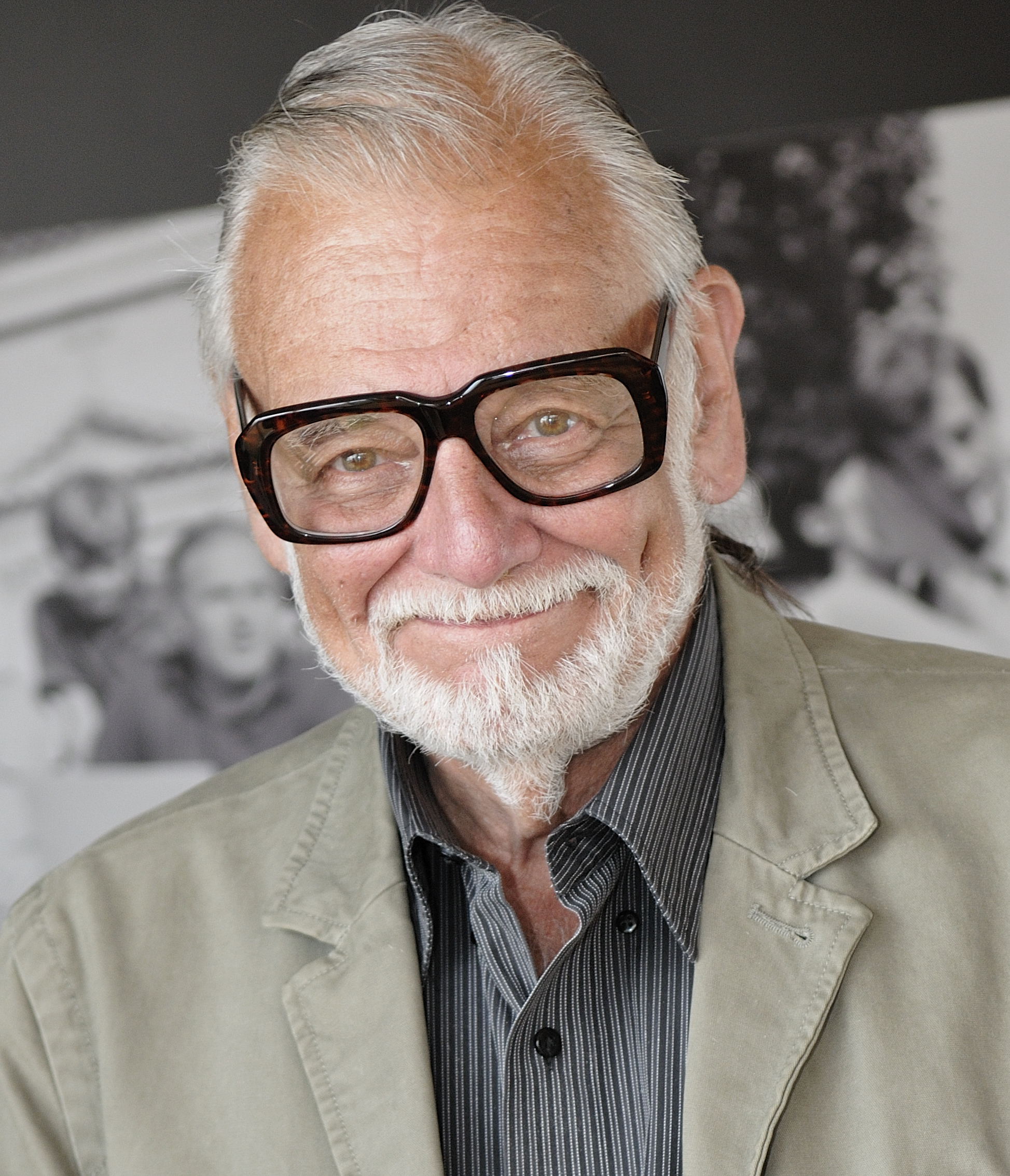
George A. Romero in 2009. Romero's Night of the Living Dead (1968) led to what Newman described as a "slow burning influence" in independent and thoughtful horror films in the 1970s.

Historian John Kenneth Muir described the 1970s as a "truly eclectic time" for horror cinema, noting a mixture of fresh and more personal efforts on film while other were a resurrection of older characters that have appeared since the 1930s and 1940s. Night of the Living Dead had what Newman described as a "slow burning influence" on horror films of the era, some just adapted the zombie framework such as The Living Dead at the Manchester Morgue (1974) while others became what Newman described as "the first of the genre auteurs", finding previous great genre directors such as Whale, Lewton and Terence Fisher had worked within studio settings. These included American directors such as John Carpenter, Tobe Hooper, Wes Craven and Brian De Palma as well as directors working outside America such as Bob Clark, David Cronenberg and Dario Argento. Prior to Night of the Living Dead, the monsters of horror films could easily be banished or defeated by the end of the film, while Romero's film and the films of other filmmakers would often suggest other horror still lingered after the credits.

Horror films continued to be made around the world in the 1970s. In the United Kingdom, Amicus focused their production on humorous horror anthologies, such as Tales from the Crypt (1972). The studio stopped producing horror films by the mid-1970s and closed in 1977. By the 1970s, Hammer Films pushed their films in different directions, such as their new series where vampires are implied to be lesbians in The Vampire Lovers (1970), Lust for a Vampire (1970) and Twins of Evil (1971). Hammer's Dracula series was updated to contemporary settings with Dracula A.D. 1972 (1972) and its sequel The Satanic Rites of Dracula (1973), after which, Lee retired from the Dracula role. Hammer ceased feature film production in the 1970s. Other small booms in the Italian film industry included Argento's The Bird with the Crystal Plumage (1970) which created a trend in Italy for the giallo film. Other smaller trends permutated in Italy such as films involving cannibals, zombies, nazis which Newman described as "disreputable crazes". Some films of the 1970s pushed the eroticism to the point of horror and Pornographic film hybrids. The rise of zombie films towards the end of the decade was triggered by Romero's follow-up to Night, with Dawn of the Dead (1978).

Remakes of proved to be popular choices for horror films in the 1970s, with films like Invasion of the Bodysnatchers (1978) and tales based on Dracula which continued into the late 1970s with John Badham's Dracula (1979) and Werner Herzog's Nosferatu the Vampyre (1979). Other American production also placed vampires in a contemporary settings with Count Yorga, Vampire (1970) and Blacula (1972). Blacula set off a cycle combining the blaxploitation and horror films with titles like Scream Blacula Scream (1973), Blackenstein (1973), and Ganja and Hess (1973). European production also continued to feature Dracula and Frankenstein such as Paul Morrissey's Blood for Dracula (1974) and Flesh for Frankenstein (1973) which both delved into the eroticism of their stories. Although not an official remake, the last high-grossing horror film of decade, Alien (1979) took b-movie elements from films like It! The Terror from Beyond Space (1958).

The Exorcist (1973) was a film that Newman described as getting Hollywood back into horror film production. Along with Rosemary's Baby, Newman described the film as having the "grit and realism" that was part of the New Hollywood movement of the period with "nuanced performances" and non-star actors. Several films with the religious motifs of The Exorcist followed in the seventies in America with films like Abby (1974) and The Omen (1976) as well as Italy with films like A Black Ribbon for Deborah (1974). In 1988, Newman later described the cycle as being "burned out instantly" with films mostly borrowing from Rosemary's Baby and the last of the cycle to borrow from The Exorcist being Amityville II: The Possession (1982).

In 1963, Hitchcock defined a new genre nature taking revenge on humanity with The Birds (1963) that was expanded into a trend into 1970s. Following the success of Willard (1971), a film about killer rats, 1972 had similar films with Stanley (1972) and an official sequel Ben (1972). Other films followed in suit such as Night of the Lepus (1972), Frogs (1972), Bug (1975), Squirm (1976) and what Muir described as the "turning point" in the genre with Jaws (1975), which became the highest-grossing film at that point and moved the animal attacks genres "towards a less-fantastic route" with less giant animals and more real-life creatures such as Grizzly (1976), Night Creature (1977), Orca (1977), and Jaws 2 (1978). Newman's described Jaws as a "concerto of shock" noting its memorable music theme and its monster not being product of society like Norman Bates in Psycho or family like in The Texas Chain Saw Massacre (1974). These elements were carried over into Carpenter's Halloween (1978) Newman described that along that high grossing films like Alien, Jaws and Halloween were hits based on "relentless suspense machines with high visual sophistication." Along with the other mainstream hit film De Palma's Carrie (1976), Halloween began the trend of teenagers becoming ever-present lead characters in horror films while Carrie itself was a film Newman described as having a "dream-logic" to its supernatural plot, which was extended to the plot of Argento's films like Suspiria (1977) and Inferno (1980), whose narrative logic was pushed to the point that Newman described their plots as "making no narrative sense".

== 1980s ==
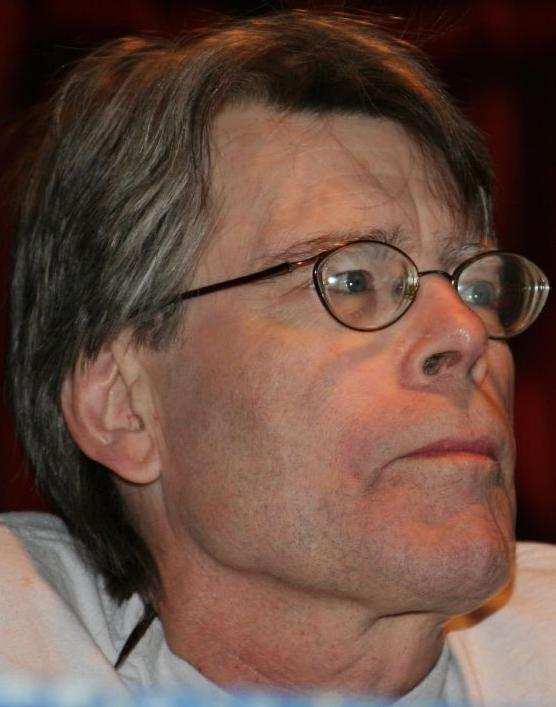
The 1980s saw a surge of films adapted from the work of Stephen King (pictured).

The 1980s marked the first major resurgence of organized horror film fandom since the early 1960s. A much looser but increasingly active community of horror fans emerged, fueled by the growing publication of fanzines and magazines such as Cinefantastique, Fangoria and Starburst, as well as the development of horror film festivals such as Shock Around the Clock and Dead by Dawn. In the appearance of home video, horror films came under attack in the United Kingdom as "video nasties" leading to people having their collection being seized by police and some people being jailed for selling or owning some horror films. Newman described the response to the video nasty issue led to horror films becoming "dumber than the previous decade" and although films were not less gory, they were "more lightweight [...] becoming more disposable, less personal works." Newman noted that these directors who created original material in the 1970s such as Carpenter, Cronenberg, and Hooper would all at least briefly "play it safe" with Stephen King adaptations or remakes of the 1950s horror material.

In Italy, the Italian film industry would gradually move towards making films for television. The decade started with a high-budgeted production of Argento's Inferno (1980) and with the death of Mario Bava, Fulci became what historian Roberto Curti called "Italy's most prominent horror film director in the early 1980s". Several zombie films were made in the country in the early 80s from Fulci and others while Argento would continue directing and producing films for others such as Lamberto Bava. As Fulci's health deteriorated towards the end of the decade, many directors turned to making horror films for Joe D'Amato's Filmirage company, independent films or works for television and home video.

In the 1980s, the older horror characters of Dracula and Frankenstein's monster rarely appeared in film outside nostalgic films like The Monster Squad (1987) and Waxwork (1988). Vampire themed films continued often in the tradition of authors like Anne Rice where vampirism becomes a lifestyle choice rather than plague or curse. This was reflected in such films as The Hunger (1983), The Lost Boys (1986), and Near Dark (1986). The 1980s highlighted several films about body transformation and men becoming wolves. Special effects and make-up artists like Rob Bottin and Rick Baker allowed for more detailed and graphic transformation scenes for creatures such as werewolves in films like An American Werewolf in London and The Howling while films like Altered States (1980), The Thing (1982), Videodrome (1983) and The Fly (1986) would show the human body in various forms transformation. Several other sequels took to the revival of 3D film in the 1980s following the surprise hit film Comin' at Ya! (1981). These included Friday the 13th Part III (1982), Parasite (1982), and Jaws 3-D (1983).

Replacing Frankenstein's monster and Dracula were new popular characters with more general names like Jason Voorhees (Friday the 13th), Michael Myers (Halloween), and Freddy Krueger (A Nightmare on Elm Street). Unlike the characters of the past who were vampires or created by mad scientists, these characters were seemingly people with common sounding names who developed the slasher film genre of the era. In his book on the genre, author Adam Rockoff that these villains represented a "rogue genre" of films with "tough, problematic, and fiercely individualistic." Following the financial success of Friday the 13th (1980), at least 20 other slasher films appeared in 1980 alone. These films usually revolved around five properties: unique social settings(campgrounds, schools, holidays) and a crime from the past committed (an accidental drowning, infidelity, a scorned lover) and a ready made group of victims (camp counselors, students, wedding parties). The genre was derided by several contemporary film critics of the era such as Ebert, and often were highly profitable in the box office. Carol J. Clover wrote in her book Men, Women, and Chain Saws (1993) that popular early 1990s films adapted themes from these slasher films with films like Sleeping with the Enemy (1991), Pacific Heights (1990) and The Silence of the Lambs (1991) as they were "awfully close to being slasher movies for yuppies" as they were "well made, well-acted and well-conceived versions" slasher storylines where female victim-heroes square off and finally defeat a monstrous oppressor without the help a male companion.

Other more traditional styles continued into the 1980s, such as supernatural themed films involving haunted houses, ghosts, and demonic possession. Among the most popular films of the style included Stanley Kubrick's The Shining (1980), Hooper's high-grossing Poltergeist (1982) and films in the Amityville Horror film franchise. After the release of films based on Stephen King's books like The Shining and Carrie led to further film adaptations of his novels such as Cujo (1983), Christine (1983), The Dead Zone (1983), Firestarter (1984), and Children of the Corn (1984). King would even direct his own film with Maximum Overdrive in 1986.

== 1990s ==
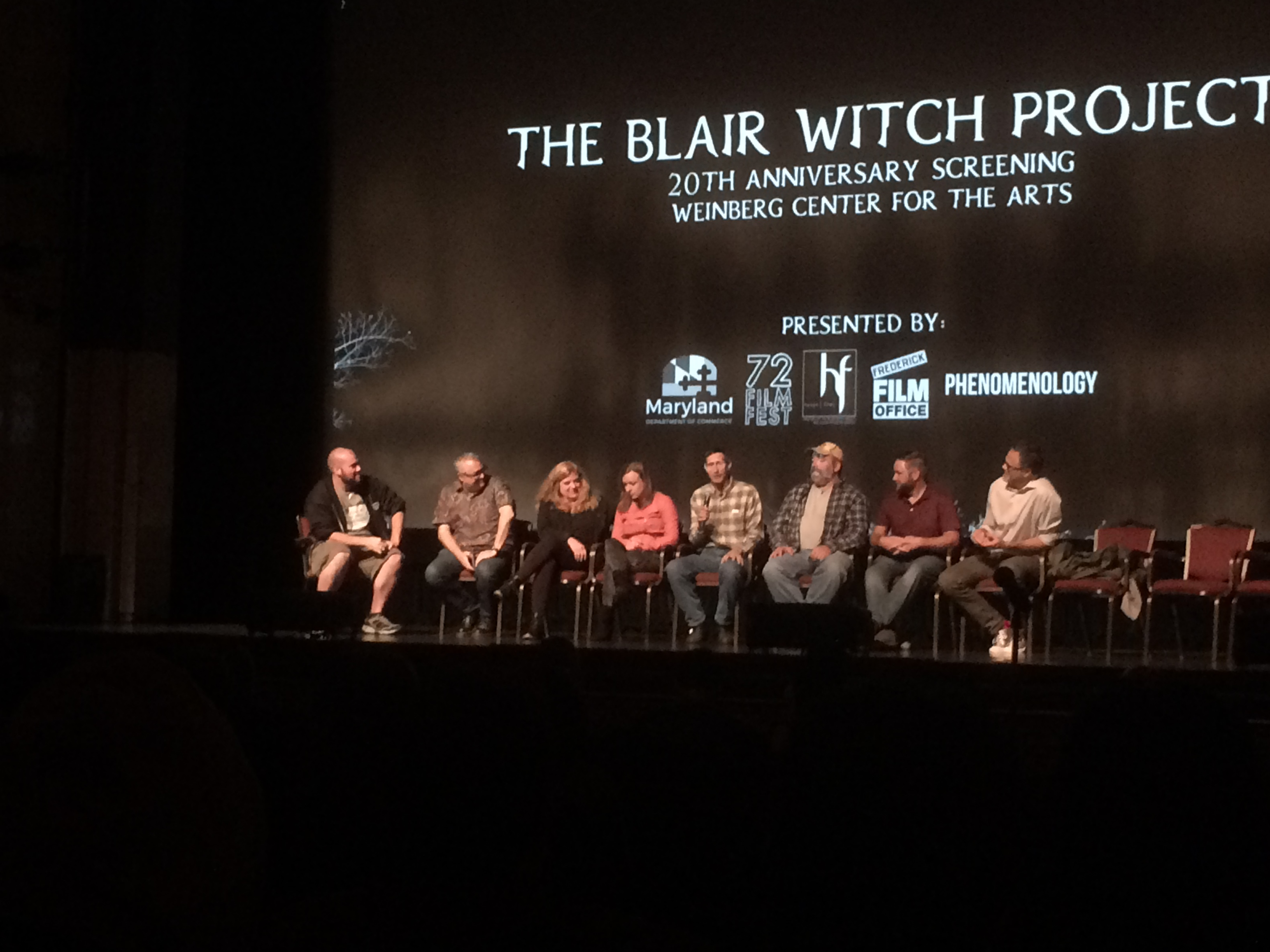
Some cast and crew members of The Blair Witch Project (1999), one of the highest grossing horror films of the 1990s

Horror films of the 1990s also failed to develop as many major new directors of the genre as it had in the 1960s or 1970s. Young independent filmmakers such as Kevin Smith, Richard Linklater, Michael Moore and Quentin Tarantino broke into cinema outside the genre at non-genre festivals like the Sundance Film Festival. Newman noted that the early 1990s was "not a good time for horror", noting excessive sequels such as The Exorcist III (1990), Amityville 1992: It's About Time (1992) and returns of sequels to The Texas Chain Saw Massacre, Friday the 13th and A Nightmare on Elm Street. Muir commented that in the 1990s after the end of the Cold War, the United States did not really have a "serious enemy" internationally, leading to horror films adapting to fictional enemies predominantly within America, with the American government, large businesses, organized religion and the upper class as well as supernatural and occult items such as vampires or Satanists filling in the horror villains of the 1990s.

Clover wrote that the horror film in the early 90s had "forked dramatically." Muir echoed this, describing the 1990s, more than any decade before it blurred genres and transcended existing ones. This led to post-modern horror films such as Wes Craven's New Nightmare (1994) which examined horror films in an American society, In the Mouth of Madness (1995) which turns reality into a horror film, and Scream (1996) which made several references to horror films of the past. The release of Scream, scripted by Kevin Williamson led to a brief revival of the slasher films including the Williamson-scripted I Know What You Did Last Summer (1997). Other styles of teen-oriented horror that were popular in the 1990s, but with less visibility than the post-Scream films were films about supernatural youth such as Mirror, Mirror (1990) and Shrunken Heads (1994) with the most popular of these films being The Craft (1996). Cultural conflicts of the 1990s became the backdrop for several horror films of the era. Ranging from issues involving abortion seen in films like The Unborn (1991) and Alien 3 (1992), political correctness (Body Snatchers (1993)), to affirmative action, welfare and race related issues seen in The People Under the Stairs (1991), Tales from the Hood (1995), and Village of the Damned (1995). The rise of other television shows such as Inside Edition, America's Most Wanted, The Jerry Springer Show, Geraldo and Donahue, horror films often featured anchorwomen and TV tabloid hosts as protagonists or supporting characters in films like Man's Best Friend (1993), Scream (1996) and The Night Flier (1997). The rapid growth of technology in the 1990s with the internet and the fears of the Year 2000 problem causing the end of the world were reflected in plots of films like The Lawnmower Man (1992), Brainscan (1994) and End of Days (1999).

Following the release of Francis Ford Coppola's Bram Stoker's Dracula (1992), a small wave of high-budgeted gothic horror romance films were released in the 1990s. These included Interview with the Vampire (1994), Mary Shelley's Frankenstein (1994), Wolf (1994) and Mary Reilly (1996). By the end of the 1990s, three films were released that Newman described as "cultural phenomenons." These included Hideo Nakata's Ring (1998), which along with the South Korean film Whispering Corridors (1998), was the major hit across Asia leading to sequels and similar ghost stories from Asian countries. The film only crossed over into the Western world after the 1990s.The second major hit was The Sixth Sense, another ghost story which Newman described as making "an instant cliche" of twist endings. The final hit was the low-budget independent film The Blair Witch Project (1999).

== 2000s ==
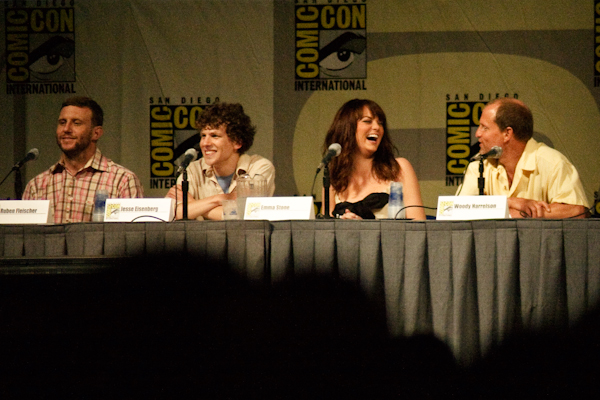
Director Ruben Fleischer and cast members of Zombieland (2009) at the 2009 San Diego Comic-Con. The film was one of the many zombie themed films of the late 2000s.

Newman described the first trend of horror films in the 2000s followed the success of The Blair Witch Project, but predominantly in a parody format: The Bogus Witch Project (2000), The Blair Underwood Project (2000) and the pornographic The Erotic Witch Project (2000). Other films included similar low-budget imitators like The St. Francisville Experiment (2000) with a similar plot to The Blair Witch Project. Alexandra Heller-Nicholas noted that the popularity of sites like YouTube in 2006 sparked a taste for amateur media, leading to the production of further films in the found footage horror genre later in the decade with Rec (2007), Diary of the Dead (2007), and Cloverfield (2008) and the particularly financially successful Paranormal Activity (2007). Following Paranormal Activity, the style was not known for the footages possible authenticity as it was with Blair Witch, but more of a specific film style.

Post-modern horror films continued into the 2000s as well with Cherry Falls (2000) and Psycho Beach Party (2000) but soon drifted purely into comedy and parody territory with the Scary Movie film series and Shriek If You Know What I Did Last Friday the 13th (2000). Other teen oriented series began in the era with Final Destination while the success of the 1999 remake of William Castle's House on Haunted Hill led to a series of remakes in the decade: Thi13en Ghosts (2001), Willard (2003), Dawn of the Dead (2004), The Fog (2005), Prom Night (2008) and The Last House on the Left (2009). Several film series long left dormant were resurrected in the 2000s as well with Jason X (2001), Beyond Re-Animator (2003), Exorcist: The Beginning (2004), and Land of the Dead (2005). The popularity and innovative approach to zombies seen in 28 Days Later (2002), Shaun of the Dead (2004) and Dawn of the Dead (2004) led to a revival zombie films in the 2000s, with I Am Legend (2007), Zombieland (2009), Dead Snow (2009) and Pontypool (2008).

Several films came from Hong Kong, South Korea, Thailand, and Japan in the wake of the success of Ring (1998). These films predominantly involved female detectives using various forms of investigation to solve mysteries about malevolent female ghosts. These included The Eye (2002), Dark Water (2002), and Into the Mirror (2003). This trend was echoed in the West with films like FeardotCom (2002), They (2002) and Gothika (2003). Hollywood also began remaking these Japanese films with The Ring (2002) and Dark Water (2005). Outside the Japanese ghost stories, Asian film industries also began developing what Newman described as "bizarre" horror films with Uzumaki (2000), Stacy (2001) and several films by Takashi Miike.

Newman declared there to be a "modest revival" of British horror films in the 2000s, with a small trend of War film related horror films with The Bunker (2001), Dog Soldiers (2002) and the Hollywood produced Below (2002). Outside of several independent films and films attempting a style of horror that Dimension Films was making in the 1990s, Newman felt the breakouts of the new British horror were My Little Eye (2002), 28 Days Later (2002), Shaun of the Dead (2004), and The Descent (2005).

At the turn of the millennium, a movement in French cinema known as New French Extremity was named by film by film programmer James Quandt, initially describing arthouse films that "determined to break every taboo, to wade in rivers of viscera and spumes of sperm, to fill each frame with flesh, nubile, or gnarled, and subject it to all manner of penetration mutilation and defilement" In her book Films of the New French Extremity, Alexandra West found that some of directors started making horror films that would still fit their art house standards such as Claire Denis's Trouble Every Day (2001) and Marina de Van's In My Skin (2002), which led to other directors to make more what West described as "outright horror films" such as Alexandre Aja's High Tension (2003) and Xavier Gens' Frontier(s) (2007). Some of these horror films of the New French Extremity movement would regularly place on "Best Of" genres lists, such as Martyrs (2008), Inside (2007) and High Tension. West described journalists and fans as seeing the more horror-oriented films of the movement as "an intellectual sibling" to the emerging trend of "Torture porn".

The 2000s also saw a resurgence in Spanish horror, with critically and commercially successful films such as The Devil's Backbone, Pan's Labyrinth, The Others, REC, and The Orphanage.

David Edelstein of The New York Times coined a term for a genre he described as "torture porn" in a 2006 article, as a label for films described, often retroactively, to over 40 films since 2003. Edelstein lumped in films such as Saw (2004), The Devil's Rejects (2005), and Wolf Creek (2005) under this banner suggesting audience a "titillating and shocking" push audiences to the margins of depravity in order to "feel something". The label was described as "intense bodily acts and visible bodily representations" to produce uneasy reactions. Kevin Wetmore, using the Saw film series suggested these film suggested reflected a post Post-9/11 attitude towards increasing pessimism, specifically one of "no redemption, no hope, no expectations that 'we're going to be OK'" Newman also noted a post-9/11 trend of stories that tend to re-work or re-do a reality that was to difficult to handle, similar to films like The Sixth Sense or The Matrix. Horror films that followed this trend included ghost stories with films like The Others (2001) and The Orphanage (2007).

== 2010s ==
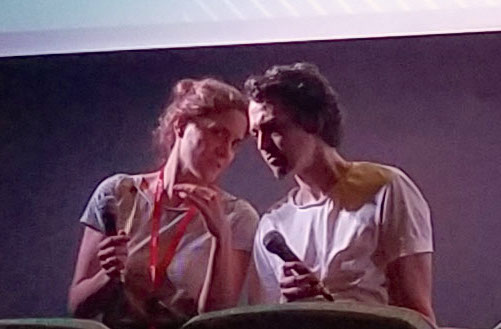
Swedish director and screenwriter Johannes Nyholm (right) presenting his horror film Koko-di Koko-da at Buenos Aires International Festival of Independent Cinema 2019

After the film studio Blumhouse had success with Paranormal Activity (2007), the studio continued to films that grew to become hits in the 2010s with film series Insidious. This led to what Newman described as the companies policy on "commercial savvy with thematic risk that has often paid off", included Get Out (2017), The Invisible Man (2020), Happy Death Day (2017) and series like The Purge. Laura Bradley in her article for Vanity Fair noted that both large and small film studios began noticing Blumhouse's success, including A24 who did not specialize in horror or genre films, made their names grow popular with films like The Witch (2015), Hereditary (2018) and Midsommar (2019). Bradley commented how some of these films were classified as "elevated horror", declaring "horror aficionados and some critics pushed back against the notion that these films are doing something entirely new." noting their roots in films like Night of the Living Dead (1968) and Rosemary's Baby (1968). Even the current trend could be traced back to earlier films like Tomas Alfredson's Let the Right One In (2008) (which inspired Robert Eggers to make The Witch), and Jennifer Kent's The Babadook (2014).

In the early 2010s, there became a wave of horror films that showed what Virginie Sélavy noted described as having psychedelic tendency that was inspired by experimentation of 1970s and its subgenres, specifically folk horror. The trend began with two films: Enter the Void (2009) and Beyond the Black Rainbow (2010). Since these films, a series of films that Sélavy described as being like "a calamitous trip or creepy dreams" were released such as Berberian Sound Studio (2011), Under the Skin (2013) and We Are the Flesh (2016), and Climax (2018). These films do not always share the consciousness-expanding spirit of 1960s and 1970s. The reasons for these trends tended to be from filmmakers who grew up in the 1970s as well as home video distributors such as Arrow Video, Shameless and Nucleus Films releasing restorations of the more outlandish and forgotten films of the original psychedelic era.

The expansion of international streaming media services is thought to have boosted the popularity of horror. Several horror television series on Netflix such as The Haunting of Hill House became successes for the platform, Blumhouse partnered with Amazon Prime Video for distribution, and Shudder, a streaming service dedicated primarily for horror titles, was launched in 2015 and grew in popularity in subsequent years. Streaming was cited as bringing increased international attention to Southeast Asian horror films, particularly Indonesian titles such as Joko Anwar's Satan's Slaves and Impetigore, and Roh from Malaysia.

Adapted from the Stephen King novel, It (2017) set a box office record for horror films by grossing $123.1 million on opening weekend in the United States and nearly $185 million globally. The success of It led to further King novels being adapted, including It Chapter Two (2019), Pet Sematary (2019), and Doctor Sleep (2019). Following the turn of the millennium rise of Asian horror films, South Korean horror films resurrected itself with zombie films including Train to Busan (2016), The Odd Family: Zombie on Sale (2019) Peninsula (2020) as well as non-zombie related films such as The Wailing (2016).

== 2020s ==
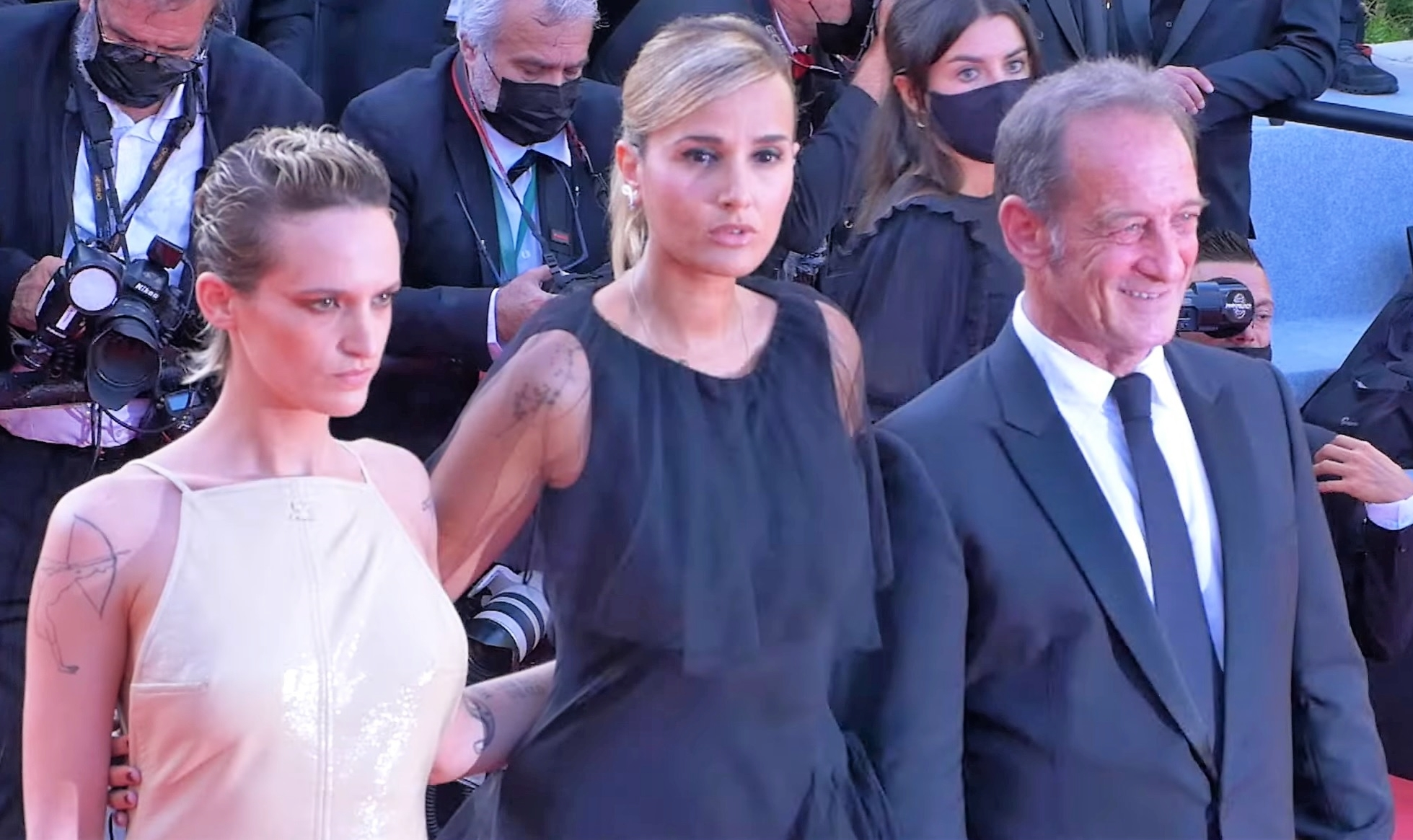
Director Julia Ducournau (centre) with cast members of body horror film Titane at the 2021 Cannes Film Festival. Titane won the Palme d'Or at the event.

The COVID-19 pandemic that began in 2020 disrupted the film industry, leading to the release of several horror films being postponed, such as A Quiet Place Part II (2020) and Candyman (2021), while other films like Censor (2021) had production halted. During lockdowns, streaming for films featuring fictional apocalypses increased. Found footage horror found itself imposed into films set on desktops in Zoom meetings with Host (2020), a film shot and set during the quarantine period of 2020, to what Newman described as further enhancing the "this really happened" aspect of the genre. More films based on internet culture followed in the years with films like Dashcam (2021), We're All Going to the World's Fair (2021), Deadstream (2022) and Bodies Bodies Bodies (2022). Newman declared that one of the grander overarching themes of 21st century horror films was about collapse, with horrific effects and imagery and sounds overwhelm conventional storytelling in favor of the logic of the nightmare.

Blumhouse furthered its relationship with Universal Pictures by scheduling similarly budgeted films like The Invisible Man (2020) following the halted launch of their Dark Universe series with the release of The Mummy (2017). Other resurrected classical horror characters were would follow with two films based on Dracula being screened in theaters in 2025 with Robert Eggers' Nosferatu (2024) and Luc Besson's Dracula (2025) as well as with Leigh Whannell's Wolf Man (2025) and Guillermo del Toro's Frankenstein.

Further franchise installments and reiterations of old stories were continued films involving Dracula, exorcisms and other entries in series such as Evil Dead, Insidious, Scream, and Saw. Smile (2022) became one of the most profitable films of the year, earning more than $217 million on a $17 million production budget. By 2025, The Hollywood Reporter described horror films as being one of the only "sure bets" left at for high grossing theatrical box office. By the middle of the decade there were further franchise through reboots like Final Destination: Bloodlines (2025) and 28 Years Later (2025), and I Know What You Did Last Summer (2025), sequels like Black Phone 2 (2025) and retro-styled slasher films like Clown in a Cornfield (2025) and Heart Eyes (2025).

== See also ==
- History of horror fiction
- History of science fiction films
- A History of Horror
- An Illustrated History of the Horror Film
- Horror Noire: A History of Black Horror
- A Heritage of Horror
