= Golden age of horror films =

The golden age of horror (also referred to as the new golden age of horror) is the period in the history of horror movies in which various subgenres of horror movies received positive attention from mainstream cinemas, movie critics, as well as the general public. The period began in the early 2010s with the release of various financially and critically successful horror films, including Insidious, Sinister, and The Conjuring. This period also include the rise of plenty of horror directors, including female directors like Jennifer Kent of The Babadook or Karyn Kusama of The Invitation. Besides this, studios like A24 and Blumhouse Productions have also been credited for the rise of a lot of critically acclaimed independent horror movies. Movies that were made with relatively low budget and performed very well in the Box Office such as Get Out and It were also released during this time. Plenty of independent movies including It Follows, The Witch and Don't Breathe have also received praise for pushing the boundaries of horror as well.
