= Flamin' Hot (soundtrack) =

Flamin' Hot (Original Soundtrack)

Film score by Marcelo Zarvos
- Released: June 9, 2023
- Genre: Film score
- Length: 36:45
- Label: Hollywood
- Producer: Marcelo Zarvos

Marcelo Zarvos chronology
White Men Can't Jump (2023)	Flamin' Hot (2023)	The Equalizer 3 (2023)

Flamin' Hot (Original Soundtrack) is the soundtrack to the 2023 film of the same name, featured the film score composed by Marcelo Zarvos. The film, directed by Eva Longoria in her feature-length directorial debut, is based on the memoir A Boy, a Burrito and a Cookie: From Janitor to Executive by Richard Montañez, with Jesse Garcia as Montañez. Zarvos has incorporated Latin and Chicano type of music, for authenticity. The score was released by Hollywood Records on June 9, 2023.

== Development ==
In an interview with The Big Score published through Hollywood Records' Vevo service, Zarvos complimented Longoria's enthusiasm for the script and her vision on what the music wanted to be accomplished. Zarvos researched the Latin soundings to feel authentic and being used as a storytelling device, as the film travels through Richard Montañez's life from the 1950s to 1990s, with the score evolves with the passing of time and dramatically anchoring the script. Dealing with the Mexican American Chicano experience, the film was always about the music and culture and its transformation within the proximity of United States and remaining true to its origins. He derived the styles of Chicano and Latin music that was "always very obvious and like many scores it was a process of trial and error" and to achieve this, he used more of guitar and brass, rather than being piano-centric.

While recording at the Newman Scoring Stage, Zarvos did not improvise much of the score, but the performers experimented with grooves and sounds, and instead limiting with studio musicians, he used a live guitarist who had "brought a lot of heart and energy to the score". Zarvos wanted it to have a rough edge and not to feel overtly produced and incorporated the live elements before used as temp tracks, as mockups were impossible to do for after live recording.

The film had several needle drops used in the score, and he wanted to work well in counterpoint but remain in its own lane as the songs were revised throughout the process. Some of the musical homages, were meant to feel like "western" that included the slow-motion shots from the hero, but in the other spots of the film, according to Zarvos, the fantasy had the rug pulled from under it, transporting back to reality, which serves as moments of humor and expectation.

The musical selections were provided by Vanessa Jorge Perry, whom had been recommended by former president of the Guild of Music Supervisors, John Houlihan to Longoria. Perry was tasked to select Chicano music from the 1970s and 1990s, who felt that they were old and ballad-typed in contrast to the film's upbeat nature and tried hard to select such songs. The first cut of the film had different songs and she argued on how few of them did not fit with the timeline and sound of the film. She also felt it challenging to find temp scores from Latin films, which are usually occupied with Flamenco-centric sounds. The film consisted of Spanish guitar as well as modern guitar sounds.

== Release ==
Flamin' Hot was preceded by the non-album promotional single "The Fire Inside" performed by Becky G and written by Diane Warren. It was released through RCA Records on June 2, 2023, with an accompanying music video released two days later. The singer's Mexican-American heritage during her performance at the Coachella 2023 served as the basis for the song. Warren wanted the song to be different than her usual ventures, discussed with Perry and Longoria through virtual communication on how the song depicts Montañez's life and determination. According to Forbes, it was considered to be a contender for Academy Award for Best Original Song. The single received such nomination on January 23, 2024.

Flamin' Hot's score was released by Hollywood Records on June 9, 2023 alongside the film's Hulu and Disney+ premiere.

== Reception ==
Peter Debruge of Variety and Frank Scheck of The Hollywood Reporter felt the music to be "well-integrated" and "uplifting". Tim Grierson of Screen International also said that Zarvos' score "acts as the driving force of the film". Diego Andaluz of DiscussingFilm complimented it as "vibrant" and "hits telegraphed beats with enough zest to where you just can't help but cheer along".

== Track listing ==
No.	Title	Length
1.	"I Got a Plan"	0:33
2.	"First Day on the Job"	0:51
3.	"Arrival At the Factory – Started At the Very Bottom"	1:46
4.	"A Lot in Common"	1:40
5.	"Starting Production"	1:49
6.	"Burns Good"	0:48
7.	"Elote"	0:44
8.	"Find Montañez"	0:34
9.	"Vacho Is Right"	0:39
10.	"The Lines Are Waiting"	1:21
11.	"Super Power"	0:39
12.	"It's a Start"	0:37
13.	"There's No Such Thing"	2:10
14.	"Richard Meets Enrico"	0:41
15.	"Pray for a Miracle"	2:24
16.	"Dragging Years"	1:17
17.	"Gum Bumper"	0:37
18.	"More Than Mopping Floors"	1:35
19.	"You're Not Worthless"	0:41
20.	"Job Application"	0:54
21.	"Promotion"	1:20
22.	"Breathe Parts 1 & 2"	1:16
23.	"Mi Reina Parts 1 & 2"	2:46
24.	"That's More Than OK With Me"	0:45
25.	"Think Like a CEO"	0:55
26.	"The Pitch"	2:38
27.	"5 Million Cases"	0:53
28.	"Richard Calls Enrico"	0:50
29.	"Motivational Speech"	1:21
30.	"Find Montañez 2"	0:35
31.	"Quiero Decirte"	1:04
32.	"You Ain't a Nobody"	1:06
Total length:		36:45
