= White Men Can't Jump (2023 soundtrack) =

White Men Can't Jump (Original Soundtrack)

Soundtrack album by Marcelo Zarvos and Oak Felder
- Released: May 19, 2023
- Genres: Film score; film soundtrack
- Length: 37:56
- Label: Hollywood
- Producers: Marcelo Zarvos; Oak Felder

Marcelo Zarvos chronology
Big George Foreman (2023)	White Men Can't Jump (2023)	Flamin' Hot (2023)

Oak Felder chronology
House Party (2023)	White Men Can't Jump (2023)	Good Burger 2 (2023)

White Men Can't Jump (Original Soundtrack) is the soundtrack to the 2023 film White Men Can't Jump, directed by Calmatic, a remake of the 1992 film of the same name. It was released on May 19, 2023 by Hollywood Records, and featured the original score jointly composed by Marcelo Zarvos and Oak Felder.

== Development ==
According to executive producer and screenwriter Kenya Barris, the film was intended to have a soundtrack produced by DJ Drama, but was not involved in the film. However, Calmatic felt that the film would feature popular artists in the soundtrack, ranging from Ed Sheeran, SZA, Armani White amongst others; Jack Harlow's 2020 single "What's Poppin" is also featured in the film.

In April 2023, Marcelo Zarvos was recruited to score music for White Men Can't Jump. Having born and grew up in Brazil, Zarvos recalled that he used to play football (a popular sport in the country) in his early days and while working with musicians and orchestras, which revolves around collaborations, he felt sports as an important element in the film and how it inspires human lives. Oak Felder was brought in to co-compose and produce the score and original music, whom he worked in Calmatic's feature directorial debut House Party, released in the same year.

Zarvos recalled on Felder's collaboration, while the latter would focus on pieces that were song-like, the former would work on the score, which has been emotional and choreographed, on which cue should be appropriate for the sequences, adding that the music never stops down. Calmatic used to supervise the cue sheet and share his insight on the score as, according to Felder, "the whole thing plays on his strengths", as he was known for directing music videos and also being a music producer.

Sharing the perspectives on the remake and its original counterpart, which came from the period of 1990s hip hop, admitting that "you got the retro vibe and put it in this film". Balancing the basketball and music culture, hip hop served as the bridge for the cultural influences, where he could borrow back the vibes from that period. While violin and percussion being used for the score, Felder felt the vocals being the primary instrument for the film as it was "the most used instrument" carrying the emotions of the film. He further attributed that at first, the music for basketball games have been evolved the film, but as the film further progresses it revolves around the story, characters and their background.

== Reception ==
Andrew Lawrence in his review for The Guardian wrote "Marcelo Zarvos’s score is an unspoiled mix of old school and new." Arun Venugopal of Maxblizz also opined the same and felt that it "provided a fitting backdrop to the story."

== Track listing ==
No.	Title	Music	Length
1.	"Duke Skywalker"	Marcelo Zarvos	1:16
2.	"Time Out"	Marcelo Zarvos	1:36
3.	"The Big Fight"	Marcelo Zarvos	2:03
4.	"Wrap Up"	Marcelo Zarvos	2:58
5.	"Garage Conversations – Just a Few Games"	Marcelo Zarvos	2:10
6.	"That Won't Work"	Oak Felder	1:01
7.	"Got My Mind Right"	Oak Felder	1:15
8.	"Little Out of Your Range"	Oak Felder	1:07
9.	"Out of Your Range"	Marcelo Zarvos	1:11
10.	"Eighty Minus Sixty"	Oak Felder	0:57
11.	"Final Game"	Oak Felder	1:01
12.	"Tournament Finale"	Oak Felder	0:56
13.	"Find Somebody to Make Money"	Oak Felder	0:46
14.	"Yoga Instructor"	Oak Felder	1:04
15.	"Bringing Up the Past"	Marcelo Zarvos	0:47
16.	"Hit This Shot Sitting Down"	Marcelo Zarvos	0:39
17.	"Tournament Finale Flashback"	Marcelo Zarvos	0:57
18.	"Getting Fired"	Marcelo Zarvos	2:03
19.	"Just Need a Plan"	Marcelo Zarvos	2:42
20.	"Injured"	Marcelo Zarvos	2:04
21.	"Making Up"	Marcelo Zarvos	1:42
22.	"Always Be Our Game"	Marcelo Zarvos	1:58
23.	"MS"	Marcelo Zarvos	1:53
24.	"Gambling on My Husband"	Marcelo Zarvos	0:47
25.	"New Private Workouts"	Marcelo Zarvos	0:43
26.	"Jeremy Wins"	Marcelo Zarvos	0:56
27.	"Stem Cells"	Oak Felder	1:24
Total length:			37:56
