= Dark Waters (soundtrack) =

2019 film soundtrack album

Dark Waters (Original Motion Picture Soundtrack)

Film score by Marcelo Zarvos
- Released: November 22, 2019
- Recorded: 2019
- Genre: Film score
- Length: 57:14
- Label: Lakeshore
- Producer: Marcelo Zarvos

Marcelo Zarvos chronology
Otherhood (2019)	Dark Waters (2019)	Human Capital (2020)

Dark Waters (Original Motion Picture Soundtrack) is the film score to the 2019 film Dark Waters directed by Todd Haynes starring Mark Ruffalo, Anne Hathaway, Tim Robbins, Bill Camp, Victor Garber, Mare Winningham, William Jackson Harper and Bill Pullman. The film score is composed by Marcelo Zarvos and released through Lakeshore Records on November 22, 2019.

== Background ==
Marcelo Zarvos composed the film score in his first collaboration with Haynes. Zarvos had personally known Haynes for a long time and both have respectively followed their individual body of work; he eventually met Haynes while the latter was editing the film. For Dark Waters, Zarvos looked for the "low-boil tension" that blurred the line between emotion and suspense, and followed Haynes' style of thriller genre, which led him to approach it in an artistic way. Zarvos liked the film as he considered the theme of environmental justice being close to his heart. His experience on films such as The Door in the Floor (2004) and Sin Nombre (2009) helped him to provide the grounded emotions onscreen. Haynes and Zarvos discussed All the President's Men (1976), The China Syndrome (1979) and The Insider (1999), which are films from the whistle-blower genre.

Zarvos noted that the film had three emotional shifts that transformed the score, from the first act being a thriller to the second act, focusing on the legal challenges, and the final act on the human cost, not only on the individual but also on the population of the West Virginian town. The film featured a nine-minute solo piano piece ("Teflon Connection") that Haynes was keen on doing. This cue appear right after "Helicopters at Wilbur's" which Haynes described it to be the loudest scene in the film and the piano piece was a transition from the loudest to the quietest moment with a single piano, which was both improvisational and rhapsodic. Haynes wanted the score to be singular to focus on an individual's search for truth, and hence the piano was the principal instrument as it focuses on the concept of singularity directly translating to the idea of an individual about environmental justice. The first part of the score focused on the eerie sense of paranoia, while despite the accenting danger being shown on screen, the music practically directed to what was happening in Rob's mind, to underline the emotional aspect in the thriller elements, to make it more human.

The opening scene along with few other scenes had the heavy industrial element to the score that mixed perfectly with the sound design, which Zarvos credited to sound designer Leslie Shatz on curating lot of layers to the feel of garage, blending perfectly with the score. Except for the piano piece, most of the music, especially the strings which were heavily processed as Haynes ensured the music should not feel organic. Much of the tracks had lot of pads and doubled electronics though not in the sense of augmenting the score. The base was primarily electronic with the live strings being doubled for a third element which neither felt organic nor electronic, and the piano pieces had lot of echoes, delays and glitchy sounds to highlight the idea of the organic being affected by something chemical, which corroding the sound of instruments for an aural analogy to describe the events onscreen. There were lot of loops, that gets degenerated more with the original sounds being grainier and degraded, which was the thrust in the final part of the score, where the last third of the film becomes progressively focused on highlighting the human cost to the people, which leads to the third act's music being more emotional and human, while having progressed through the cat-and-mouse feel in the legal proceedings, and afterwards the music becomes much more melancholic and elegaic as it reaches the conclusion.

== Release ==
Lakeshore Records released the soundtrack on November 22, 2019, in conjunction with the film's release.

== Reception ==
Matt Zoller Seitz of RogerEbert.com described it as an "evocative music score by Brazilian Marcelo Zarvos". Scot F of The Curb wrote, "the foreboding score by Marcelo Zarvos tries to give us a sense of dread". Josh McCormack of Mountain Xpress stated "The music, by composer Marcelo Zarvos, is also not well utilized, with most of the score feeling as if it's manipulating viewers in how to feel, rather than letting them take in the emotional weight of the scenes by themselves." Peg Aloi of The Arts Fuse wrote, "The music by Marcelo Zarvos is moody, spare, and evocative, an effective counterpoint to the secrets and fears lurking just beneath this story's surface." Robert Abele of TheWrap called it an "icy piano score". Reviewer based at Boston Herald wrote, "The same is true of the nervous score by Marcelo Zarvos."

== Track listing ==
No.	Title	Length
1.	"Drive to Parkersburg"	1:31
2.	"City Montage"	1:40
3.	"Filing the Suit"	1:39
4.	"Cow Attack"	2:22
5.	"Sea of Boxes"	1:14
6.	"TV Reports"	2:04
7.	"The Findings"	2:40
8.	"Helicopter at Wilbur's"	2:21
9.	"Teflon Connection"	9:29
10.	"Memo / EPA Hearing"	2:07
11.	"Angry Joe"	1:58
12.	"Leave This Place / Blood Testing"	3:20
13.	"Funny Teeth"	2:11
14.	"Still Fighting"	0:56
15.	"Bucky"	2:24
16.	"Harry's Call Center"	1:05
17.	"Opening Credits"	1:50
18.	"Meeting Wilbur / PFOA"	1:28
19.	"DuPont Deposition"	3:50
20.	"Garage Paranoia"	2:26
21.	"Rob Brings Report / Wilbur's Videos"	2:19
22.	"Dark Waters"	2:53
23.	"End Credits"	3:27
Total length:		57:14
