= The Equalizer 3 (soundtrack) =

The Equalizer 3 (Original Motion Picture Soundtrack)

Film score by Marcelo Zarvos
- Released: September 1, 2023
- Genre: Film score
- Length: 58:00
- Label: Madison Gate Records
- Producer: Marcelo Zarvos

Marcelo Zarvos chronology
Flamin' Hot (2023)	The Equalizer 3 (2023)	Cassandro (2023)

The Equalizer 3 (Original Motion Picture Soundtrack) is the soundtrack to the 2023 film The Equalizer 3, the third instalment in The Equalizer franchise. The score featuring original music composed by Marcelo Zarvos released coinciding with the film on September 1, 2023, by Madison Gate Records. Dutch artist Thomas Azier provided additional composition for the film and his song Love, Disorderly was used for the soundtrack.

== Development ==
In May 2023, Marcelo Zarvos was brought in to score the film's music after previously collaborating with Fuqua in Brooklyn's Finest (2009), What's My Name: Muhammad Ali (2019), The Guilty (2021) and Emancipation (2022). He replaced Harry Gregson-Williams, who scored the previous instalments in the trilogy.

== Reception ==
Complimenting the score as "quietly alarming" Murtada Elfadl of Variety said that the score has two modes "threateningly ominous or loudly throbbing" and called it as "very effective, like so much of the film, delivering exactly what's expected". Wendy Ide of The Guardian wrote that "Thomas Azier violence-heralding musical motif on the score sounds like an electric guitar being butchered". Renuka Vyahare of The Times of India called the score as "unnerving" and "sets the mood for a taut action thriller that isn't devoid of a heart". Clarisse Loughrey of The Independent wrote "while composer Marcelo Zarvos's screaming chords hint at an edgier, modern update, it's still largely a retrograde affair". Kyle Smith of The Wall Street Journal called the score as "eerie" and "frightening". Filmtracks.com wrote "Zarvos' largely organic take on The Equalizer 3 is more dynamic and emotionally varied than Gregson-Williams' scores, and it contains ten minutes of very compelling highlights. But the loss of the explicit franchise theme, the terrible Azier cues, and an album that is frustratingly out of chronological order are significant detriments."

== Track listing ==
No.	Title	Artist(s)	Length
1.	"Prelude"		1:35
2.	"Nine Seconds"	Marcelo Zarvos; Thomas Azier	2:50
3.	"Vincent's Demise"		4:21
4.	"First Walk"		1:18
5.	"Marco Threatens Gio"		2:26
6.	"Angelo's Shop Burned"		1:43
7.	"Aminah"		2:41
8.	"Drive to Vineyard"		1:59
9.	"They Should Have Let Him In"		2:46
10.	"Bottom Up"		1:45
11.	"Collins Makes Contact"		2:54
12.	"That's Who You Are"		2:34
13.	"Did He Save a Good Man?"		2:01
14.	"Synthetic Amphetamine"		2:58
15.	"Robert Phones Collins"		2:11
16.	"Good Man Bad Man"		2:04
17.	"Robert Gives Himself Up"		4:11
18.	"Altamonte's Victory"		4:14
19.	"Fireside Chat"		1:53
20.	"Interpol Raid"		1:02
21.	"Barbarian at the Gate"		1:25
22.	"Robert Reconsiders"		1:33
23.	"Love, Disorderly (The Equalizer 3 Edit)"	Thomas Azier	2:28
24.	"A Storm Is Brewing"		3:08
Total length:			58:00
