= Spacewoman (2024 film) =

Documentary film about astronaut Eileen Collins

- Directed by: Hannah Berryman
- Written by: Hannah Berryman
- Based on: Through the Glass Ceiling to the Stars by Eileen Collins and Jonathan H. Ward
- Produced by: Keith Haviland; Natasha Dack Ojumu
- Cinematography: Ian Salvage
- Edited by: James Gold
- Music by: Marcelo Zarvos
- Production companies: Haviland Digital; TigerLily Films
- Release date: 2024
- Running time: 101 minutes
- Country: United Kingdom
- Language: English

Spacewoman is a documentary film written and directed by Hannah Berryman about American astronaut Eileen Collins, the first woman to pilot and command a Space Shuttle.

It had its world premiere at DOC NYC and its European premiere at CPH:DOX in March 2025. The movie was released in UK cinemas in October 2025 and in US cinemas from March 2026. It was released on US digital platforms in June 2026.

== Premise ==
Spacewoman explores the life and career of Eileen Collins, who became the first woman to pilot a Space Shuttle and later the first woman to command one. Using archival footage and interviews, the documentary explores Collins's career at NASA, her experiences as a woman in aviation and spaceflight, and the impact of her career on her family.

== Production ==
Spacewoman was written and directed by Hannah Berryman and is based on Eileen Collins's memoir, Through the Glass Ceiling to the Stars, written by Collins and Jonathan H. Ward. The film was produced by Keith Haviland and Natasha Dack Ojumu of Haviland Digital and Tigerlily Productions respectively.

According to Berryman, producer Haviland, who had previously worked on films about space, optioned Collins's memoir and approached her, alongside Natasha Dack, about making a film on Collins. Berryman expressed that she immediately wanted to make the documentary after reading the book. She further said that what interested her about Collins was her difficult background, particularly how the fear she had to overcome as a child helped her develop the ability to confront fear, which was important in her work as a pilot, although it also had impact for her family life and motherhood.

Speaking on the score, Berryman stated that she and producer Natasha Dack considered composers early in the production and approached Marcelo Zarvos, who joined the project and spent months crafting the music with editor James Gold, after which it was recorded in Budapest and Prague.

== Release ==
Spacewoman had its world premiere at DOC NYC. It subsequently screened at the Athena Film Festival and the Boulder International Film Festival, before making its European premiere in the Science strand of CPH:DOX on 22 March 2025. It also screened in the Sydney Science Fiction Film Festival in October 2025.

In October 2025, the film had received a theatrical release in selected UK cinemas. It subsequently had its theatrical release across various locations in the United States in 2026.

== Reception ==
Lisa Kennedy of The New York Times designated Spacewoman a Critic's Pick, describing the documentary as "engrossing". Kennedy also highlighted Marcelo Zarvos's score around Collins's 2005 mission aboard Discovery.

Monica Castillo of RogerEbert.com described Spacewoman as a "heartwarming and inspiring story of a woman defying the odds, sexism, and workplace danger to make history". Castillo praised the documentary's combination of home movies, NASA footage and interviews with Collins's family and former colleagues, which she said created a fuller account of Collins's professional and personal achievements.

Mark Adams of Business Doc Europe described Spacewoman as "highly watchable". Adams praised the film for being "as well-balanced as its subject" in exploring "the dangers of her chosen profession as well as the pressures it had on her family life".

Louisa Moore, writing for Screen Zealots, notes that "the storytelling is fantastic, as Berryman weaves together history, personal narrative, and broader questions about risk and human endeavor."
