= The Words (film) =

- Theatrical release poster
- Directed by: Brian Klugman; Lee Sternthal
- Written by: Brian Klugman; Lee Sternthal
- Produced by: Michael Benaroya; Cassian Elwes; Tatiana Kelly; Laura Rister; Jim Young
- Starring: Bradley Cooper; Jeremy Irons; Dennis Quaid; Olivia Wilde; Zoe Saldaña; Ben Barnes; Nora Arnezeder
- Cinematography: Antonio Calvache
- Edited by: Leslie Jones
- Music by: Marcelo Zarvos
- Production companies: CBS Films; Animus Films; Benaroya Pictures; Serena Films; Waterfall Media
- Distributed by: CBS Films
- Release dates: January 27, 2012 (Sundance); September 7, 2012 (United States)
- Running time: 97 minutes
- Country: United States
- Language: English
- Budget: $6 million
- Box office: $16.4 million

The Words is a 2012 American mystery romantic drama film, written and directed by Brian Klugman and Lee Sternthal in their directorial debut. It stars Bradley Cooper, Zoe Saldaña, Olivia Wilde, Jeremy Irons, Ben Barnes, Dennis Quaid, and Nora Arnezeder. Cooper, a childhood friend of Klugman and Sternthal from Philadelphia, was also the executive producer.

Revered fiction writer Clayton Hammond, on a book tour with his latest novel, meets aspiring writer Daniella while at the peak of his literary success, who soon inadvertently discovers he may have stolen another man's work.

The film premiered at the Sundance Film Festival and was theatrically released on September 7, 2012.

== Plot ==
Clayton Hammond is doing a reading of his new book, The Words. He begins reading the book, which centers on the fictional character Rory Jansen, an aspiring writer who lives in NYC with his girlfriend, Dora. He borrows some money from his father, gets a job as a mail supervisor at a literary agency, and attempts to sell his first novel, which is repeatedly rejected by publishers.

After living together for some time, Rory and Dora marry and, during their honeymoon in Paris, she buys him an old briefcase he was admiring in an antiques store. Returning to America and having his book rejected again, Rory finds an old but masterfully written manuscript in the briefcase with a central character named Jack.

Rory types the manuscript into his laptop to know what it feels like to write something truly great, even if it is only pretend. Later, while using the laptop, Dora happens upon the novel and reads it. She mistakenly assumes that Rory wrote it and convinces him to give it to a publisher at work, Joseph Cutler. After a few months, Cutler finally reads it and offers him a contract, which he accepts. The book is a hit, and Rory becomes famous.

At this point, Hammond takes a break from the reading and goes backstage, where he is introduced by his agent to Daniella, a student and amateur writer who wants to interview him. She notes that he is separated from his wife, although he still wears a wedding ring. Hammond agrees to meet her after the ceremony and returns to the stage, where he continues the reading.

The second part details Rory's encounter with an old man in Central Park, who reveals himself as the true author of the manuscript, based on his life in Paris. When he was a young man and stationed in France with the U.S. Army in the final days of World War II, he fell in love with Celia, a French waitress. They eventually married and had a daughter, who died in infancy shortly after.

Unable to cope with the loss, Celia left him and moved to her parents' home in the country. He then used his pain as inspiration to write the manuscript, which he took to her during his visit. She found the story so moving, she returned to him. However, Celia unintentionally left the manuscript in a briefcase on the train after her trip back to Paris, losing it. Because of this, their reconciliation was short-lived, and they divorced soon afterwards.

The public reading ends, and Hammond tells his fans they must buy the book to learn how it ends. Daniella then accompanies him back to his apartment, where she pressures him into telling her the ending. Hammond explains that Rory tells the truth about the story's creation, first to his wife and then to Cutler. He also tells him he wants to credit the old man as the true author. Cutler angrily advises against this, as it would severely damage both their reputations, and instead recommends giving the old man a share of the book's profits.

Rory then seeks out the old man to pay him, only to find him working in a plant nursery. He refuses the money, then tells about seeing Celia once more. Years after his divorce, while riding the train to work, he spotted her with a new husband and a young son at a train station. The old man points out that people always move on from their mistakes, and Rory will too.

Daniella continues to pressure Hammond for more details. He reveals that the old man died not long after Rory's second meeting with him, along with the secret of the manuscript's true author. Daniella deduces that The Words is actually an autobiographical book, with Rory as Hammond's surrogate.

Daniella kisses Hammond, reassuring him that people move on from their mistakes, but he pulls away, telling her that there is a fine line between life and fiction. The film flashes back to Rory and Dora in their kitchen, as he whispers "I'm sorry" in her ear.

== Cast ==
- Bradley Cooper as Rory Jansen
- Zoe Saldaña as Dora Jansen
- Olivia Wilde as Daniella
- Jeremy Irons as The Old Man
- Ben Barnes as the Young Man
- Dennis Quaid as Clay Hammond
- J. K. Simmons as Mr. Jansen
- John Hannah as Richard Ford
- Nora Arnezeder as Celia
- Željko Ivanek as Joseph Cutler
- Michael McKean as Nelson Wyllie
- Ron Rifkin as Timothy Epstein
- Brian Klugman as Jason Rosen
- Liz Stauber as Camy Rosen
- Lee Sternthal as Brett Copsey

== Themes ==
The script includes several references to writer Ernest Hemingway. Rory and Dora view a commemorative plaque to Hemingway during their Paris honeymoon. The plot device of Celia leaving her husband's manuscript in a leather satchel on a train is reminiscent of a similar episode in Hemingway's life, when his first wife Hadley left a briefcase containing all of his writings up to 1922 on a train; the manuscripts were never recovered. Roger Ebert points out the similarity between the name of the character "The Old Man" and Hemingway's novel The Old Man and the Sea, and the commonality of the name Dora among the wives of novelists.

== Allegations of similarity to Swiss novel ==
According to some Swiss newspapers, the plot of The Words is similar to that of the 2004 novel Lila Lila by Martin Suter (made into the German film Lila, Lila released in 2009), which is also about a young unsuccessful author who discovers an old manuscript, is pushed by his girlfriend into publishing it, becomes enormously successful, is later confronted by an old man who is (or in that case, knows) the original author, and then publishes a second book about how this all happened.

Brian Klugman and Lee Sternthal say that they knew nothing of Suter, his work, or Lila Lila. They had the idea and began writing The Words in 1999, years before Lila Lila was published. Together they attended the 2000 Sundance Screenwriter's Lab with their original screenplay.

== Production ==
=== Filming ===
Filming began in Montreal, Quebec, Canada, on June 7, 2011 for a period of 25 days. The Montreal location was used because it could pass as both Paris and New York.

== Release ==
The Words had its world premiere at the 2012 Sundance Film Festival. Prior to its official premiere and following a press and industry screening at Sundance, the film was purchased by CBS Films for $2 million with a $1.5 million print and advertising commitment.

The Words grossed $11.5 million in North America and $4.9 million in other territories, for a worldwide total of $16.4 million, against a production budget of $6 million. The film made $4.5 million in its opening weekend, finishing in fourth.

== Reception ==
On Rotten Tomatoes the film has an approval rating of 24% based on 127 reviews, with an average rating of 4.6/10. The website's critics consensus reads: "Neither as clever nor as interesting as it appears to think it is, The Words maroons its talented stars in an overly complex, dramatically inert literary thriller that's ultimately a poor substitute for a good book." At Metacritic, the film received a weighted average score of 37 out of 100 based on 30 critics, indicating "generally unfavorable reviews". Audiences polled by CinemaScore gave the film an average grade of "B" on an A+ to F scale.

Roger Ebert gave the film 2 stars out of 4. Jen Chaney from The Washington Post gave the film 1.5 out of 5 stars, saying it "is a well-acted but narratively limp indie that’s undermined by a failure to connect emotionally with its audience". Chris Pandolfi from At A Theater Near You praised the film, saying that while its "ambiguity is unlikely to be appreciated by everyone," it "deserves to be structurally, emotionally, and thematically analyzed". Stephen Holden of The New York Times also praised the film as "a clever, entertaining yarn".
