= Brian Klugman =

American actor, screenwriter, and director (born 1975)

- Born: September 15, 1975 (age 51); Philadelphia, Pennsylvania, U.S.
- Occupations: Actor, writer, film director
- Years active: 1993–present
- Relatives: Jack Klugman (great-uncle); Adam Klugman (first cousin once removed)

Brian Klugman (born September 15, 1975) is an American actor, screenwriter and director. In 2012 he debuted as a co-director with Lee Sternthal on the film The Words, which they both co-wrote as well.

== Early life ==
Klugman was born and raised in Philadelphia, Pennsylvania. His father, Gerald, is a real estate broker, and his mother, Helen, is a school teacher. He has an older brother, Jeffrey, a younger sister, Laurie, and a younger brother, Michael. His paternal grandfather, Reuben, is actor Jack Klugman's brother.

== Career ==
His most recent role has been Dr. Oliver Wells in Bones. He appeared in Cloverfield, The Bogus Witch Project, Dreamland, Joan of Arcadia, Can't Hardly Wait, and National Lampoon's Adam & Eve. He also played Kirby Gardner, a student, in several episodes of Frasier and activist Macleod Sinclair in s5:E15 of Psych.

Klugman appeared in the 2009 horror/thriller Vacancy 2: The First Cut in the role of "Reece."

Klugman is also credited with the story for 2010's Tron: Legacy with Lee Sternthal, and Edward Kitsis and Adam Horowitz, the duo who wrote the screenplay.

== Filmography ==
=== Film ===
Year	Title	Role	Notes
1992	Fly by Night	Long Island teen #1	
1997	Wishmaster	Medical student	
1998	Can't Hardly Wait	Stoner guy	
1998	Suicide, the Comedy		
1999	Random Acts of Violence	Johnathan	
1999	Teaching Mrs. Tingle	Student	Uncredited
2000	The Bogus Witch Project	Joshua	Direct-to-video; Segment: "The Bel Air Witch Project"
2004	Burning Annie	Charles	
2004	The Princess Diaries 2: Royal Engagement	Military Guard	
2005	Adam and Eve	Munch	
2006	Griffin & Phoenix	Beach stud	
2006	Dreamland	Abraham	
2008	Cloverfield	Charlie	
2008	Damn You Stephen Hawking	The K Man	Direct-to-video
2008	Vacancy 2: The First Cut	Reece	Direct-to-video
2009	Jack the Reaper	Teddy	Short film
2010	Tron: Legacy	—N/a	Story by
2012	The Words	Jason Rosen	Also director and writer
2012	I'm Coming Over	Todd Trumball	Short film
2015	Baby, Baby, Baby	Sydney Greenbaum	Also director and writer
2023	Maestro	Aaron Copland	

=== Television ===
Year	Title	Role	Notes
1997	Baywatch Nights		Episode: "Zargtha"
1997	The Pretender	Tiimothy	Episode: "Over the Edge"
1997	Jenny	Jason	Episode: "A Girl's Gotta Deck the Halls"
1997–1998	The Parent 'Hood	Big Mo	3 episodes
1998	ER	Russell	Episode: "Of Past Regret and Future Fear"
1998	American Express – Virtual Reality	Store employee	Commercial
1998	Beyond Belief: Fact or Fiction	Engineer	Episode: "The Plane, The Gun, The Portrait, The Pass & The Caller"
1998–1999	Felicity	Guy	7 episodes
1999	The '60s	Wahoo	Television miniseries
1999	Good vs Evil	White Chocolate	Episode: "Choose Your Own Evil"
2000	Ladies Man	Noodle	Episode: "Jimmy Dot Com"
2000–2001	Frasier	Kirby Gardner	6 episodes
2002	NYPD Blue	Jerry Gaviola	2 episodes
2003	Monster Makers	Brent Corman	Television film
2004	Joan of Arcadia	Cashier God	Episode: "Requiem for a Third Grade Ashtray"
2004	The Dave Sheridan Show	Frank	Television film
2006	Misconceptions		Episode: "Got to Get You Out of My Life"
2007	CSI: Crime Scene Investigation	P.J. Turner	Episode: "Law of Gravity"
2007	Mad Men	Judd	Episode: "The Hobo Code"
2007	House	Stark	Episode: "97 Seconds"
2007	Life	Sean	Episode: "Dig a Hole"
2008–2009	Head Case	Hardwood floor guy	2 episodes Also writer of episode: "Live and Let Diet"
2009	Without a Trace	Josh Haber	Episode: "Hard Landing"
2010	Castle	Paul McCardle	Episode: "3XK"
2010	Psych	Macleod Sinclaire	Dead Bear Walking
2013–2016	Bones	Dr. Oliver Wells	8 episodes
