= List of horror films of the 1960s =

Horror films released in the 1960s are listed in the following articles:

- List of horror films of 1960
- List of horror films of 1961
- List of horror films of 1962
- List of horror films of 1963
- List of horror films of 1964
- List of horror films of 1965
- List of horror films of 1966
- List of horror films of 1967
- List of horror films of 1968
- List of horror films of 1969
