= The Bogus Witch Project =

2000 American comedy film

- Directed by: Victor Kargan
- Written by: Sam Jaffe
- Produced by: Mark Amin; Alex Zamm
- Starring: Pauly Shore
- Music by: Carvin Knowles
- Release date: October 10, 2000
- Running time: 85 minutes
- Country: United States
- Language: English

The Bogus Witch Project is a 2000 American parody film directed by Victor Kargan and starring Pauly Shore. It satirizes The Blair Witch Project. It uses different tellings of the Blair Witch, such as The Blair Underwood Project. The film was released direct-to-DVD through Trimark Pictures on October 10, 2000.

== Cast ==
- Pauly Shore - Host

The Griffith Witch Project

- Steve Agee
- Kelly Aluise (credited as Kelly Anne Conroy)

The Bel Air Witch Project

- Jenna Leigh Green

The Willy Witch Projects

- Susan Johnson

== Reception ==
On the review aggregator website Rotten Tomatoes, 0% of 5 critics' reviews are positive, with an average rating of 1.9/10.

Alex Sandell of Juicy Cerebellum commented: "How could Pauly Shore get worse?!? Seriously. How???" while Bobby Ludbrook called it "one of the worst spoofs i have ever seen", and Clint Morris of Moviehole suggested to "take this out to the woods, bury it and be done with it".
