= Marcelo Zarvos =

Brazilian pianist and composer

- Zarvos in 2026

Background information
- Born: Marcelo Uchoa Zarvos; São Paulo, Brazil
- Genres: Film score, soundtrack, jazz, ambient, new-age, electronic
- Occupations: Composer, pianist
- Instruments: Piano, keyboards
- Spouse: Janel Moloney (m. 2010)
- Website: zarvos.com

Marcelo Uchoa Zarvos is a Brazilian pianist and film composer.

== Early life ==
Zarvos was born in São Paulo. He began in classical music in his teens and studied at the Berklee College of Music. He later attended the California Institute of the Arts, and graduated with a BFA in Music in 1992.

== Career ==
He is known for his jazz compositions and had success with the album Dualism accompanied by saxophonist Peter Epstein. He has done several film scores including Kissing Jessica Stein, The Door in the Floor, Boynton Beach Club, The Air I Breathe, Sin Nombre, Beastly, The Beaver, Won't Back Down, The Words, American Ultra, The Choice, Wonder, A Journal for Jordan, Emancipation, Flamin' Hot, Big George Foreman, May December and KPop Demon Hunters. His music has been recorded a number of times by the string quartet Ethel.

== Personal life ==
He is married to Janel Moloney, and they have two children.

== Filmography ==
=== Theatrical films ===
Year	Title	Director	Notes
2000	Tully	Hilary Birmingham	—N/a
2001	Kissing Jessica Stein	Charles Herman-Wurmfeld	—N/a
2001	The Buffalo War	Matthew Testa	—N/a
2002	2wks, 1yr	Chris McKay	—N/a
2002	Xingu: Land of No Shame	Michael Engel	—N/a
2003	The Mudge Boy	Michael Burke	—N/a
2004	The Door in the Floor	Tod Williams	—N/a
2005	Strangers with Candy	Paul Dinello	—N/a
2005	Our Brand Is Crisis	Rachel Boynton	—N/a
2005	Four Lane Highway	Dylan McCormick	—N/a
2005	Escape Artists	Michael Laurence	—N/a
2005	Boynton Beach Club	Susan Seidelman	—N/a
2006	The Architect	Matt Tauber	—N/a
2006	Ira & Abby	Robert Cary	—N/a
2006	Hollywoodland	Allen Coulter	—N/a
2006	The Good Shepherd	Robert De Niro	Composed with Bruce Fowler
2007	You Kill Me	John Dahl	—N/a
2007	The Air I Breathe	Jieho Lee	—N/a
2007	Trainwreck: My Life as an Idiot	Tod Harrison Williams	—N/a
2008	What Just Happened	Barry Levinson	—N/a
2008	Winged Creatures	Rowan Woods	—N/a
2008	New York, I Love You	Joshua Marston	Joshua Marston segment
2008	Last Stop 174	Bruno Barreto	—N/a
2009	Brooklyn's Finest	Antoine Fuqua	—N/a
2009	Sin Nombre	Cary Joji Fukunaga	—N/a
2010	Please Give	Nicole Holofcener	—N/a
2010	Remember Me	Allen Coulter	—N/a
2011	Beastly	Daniel Barnz	—N/a
2011	The Beaver	Jodie Foster	—N/a
2011	Friends with Kids	Jennifer Westfeldt	—N/a
2012	The Words	Brian Klugman	—N/a
2012	The Bay	Barry Levinson	—N/a
2012	Won't Back Down	Daniel Barnz	—N/a
2013	Reaching for the Moon	Bruno Barreto	—N/a
2013	The Hot Flashes	Susan Seidelman	—N/a
2013	Enough Said	Nicole Holofcener	—N/a
2013	The Face of Love	Arie Posin	—N/a
2014	Little Accidents	Sara Colangelo	—N/a
2014	The Humbling	Barry Levinson	—N/a
2014	Adult Beginners	Ross Katz	—N/a
2015	American Ultra	Nima Nourizadeh	—N/a
2015	Rock the Kasbah	Barry Levinson	—N/a
2016	Our Kind of Traitor	Susanna White	—N/a
2016	Cell	Tod Williams	—N/a
2016	The Choice	Ross Katz	—N/a
2016	Fences	Denzel Washington	—N/a
2017	Wonder	Stephen Chbosky	—N/a
2018	The Land of Steady Habits	Nicole Holofcener	—N/a
2018	Mapplethorpe	Ondi Timoner	—N/a
2019	The Best of Enemies	Robin Bissell	—N/a
2019	Breakthrough	Roxann Dawson	—N/a
2019	Otherhood	Cindy Chupack	—N/a
2019	Human Capital	Marc Meyers	—N/a
2019	Dark Waters	Todd Haynes	—N/a
2020	Penguin Bloom	Glendyn Ivin	—N/a
2021	The Guilty	Antoine Fuqua	—N/a
2021	A Journal for Jordan	Denzel Washington	—N/a
2022	Deep Water	Adrian Lyne	—N/a
2022	Emancipation	Antoine Fuqua	—N/a
2023	Flamin' Hot	Eva Longoria	—N/a
2023	Big George Foreman	George Tillman Jr.	—N/a
2023	May December	Todd Haynes	Adaptation and re-orchestration of Michel Legrand's score for The Go-Between
2023	The Equalizer 3	Antoine Fuqua	—N/a
2024	The Front Room	Max Eggers; Sam Eggers	—N/a
2024	Spacewoman	Hannah Berryman	—N/a
2025	Nonnas	Stephen Chbosky	—N/a
2025	KPop Demon Hunters	Chris Appelhans, Maggie Kang	Original songs by Danny Chung, Ido, Vince, Kush, Ejae, Jenna Andrews, Stephen Kirk, Lindgren, Mark Sonnenblick, and Daniel Rojas
2026	Madden	David O. Russell	—N/a

=== Television films ===
Year	Title	Director	Notes
2009	Taking Chance	Ross Katz	—N/a
2010	You Don't Know Jack	Barry Levinson	—N/a
2011	Too Big to Fail	Curtis Hanson	—N/a
2013	Phil Spector	David Mamet	—N/a
2019	What's My Name: Muhammad Ali	Antoine Fuqua	—N/a
2022	Ray Donovan: The Movie	David Hollander	—N/a

=== Short films ===
Year	Title	Director	Notes
1998	Uma História de Futebol	Paulo Machline	—N/a
2000	The Happy Prince	Garcia Rivas Alba; Alba Enid Garcia	—N/a
2002	Abbie Down East	Ellen-Alinda Verhoeff	—N/a
2002	Baseado em Estórias Reais	Gustavo Moraes	—N/a
2003	La sexta sección	Alex Rivera	—N/a
2005	The Foster Son	Ellen-Alinda Verhoeff	—N/a
2006	Cosmic Collisions	Carter Emmart	—N/a
2008	The Receiver	Anne Devereux	—N/a
2013	Presque pareil	Élisabeth Desbiens	—N/a

=== Television series ===
Year	Title	Notes
2009	30 for 30	Episode: The Band That Wouldn't Die
2010–2013	The Big C	39 episodes
2013–2020	Ray Donovan	82 episodes
2014	Extant	13 episodes
2014	The Affair	53 episodes
2015–2017	Z: The Beginning of Everything	10 episodes
2015–2017	One Mississippi	12 episodes
2019	The Loudest Voice	7 episodes
2020	FreeRayshawn	15 episodes
