= List of Mexican films of 1968 =

A list of the films produced in Mexico in 1968 (see 1968 in film):

== 1968 ==
Title	Director	Cast	Genre	Notes
5 de chocolate y 1 de fresa	Carlos Velo	Angélica María, Fernando Luján, Enrique Rambal		
El grito	Leobardo López Aretche			made with documentary material from UNAM students
La puerta y la mujer del carnicero	Luis Alcoriza, Ismael Rodríguez, Chano Urueta	Armando Silvestre, Katy Jurado, Ana Luisa Peluffo		
Hasta el viento tiene miedo	Carlos Enrique Taboada	Marga López, Maricruz Olivier		
México de Noche	Arturo Martínez	Valentín Trujillo, Juan Orol, Rosa Carmina		
María Isabel	Federico Curiel	Silvia Pinal, José Suárez, Norma Lazareno		
Estafa de amor	Miguel Zacarías	Jorge Rivero, Lorena Velázquez, Maricruz Olivier		
Corona de lagrimas	Alejandro Galindo	Marga López, Enrique Lizalde, Juan Ferrara, Ana Martín, Javier Ruán		
Pax?	Wolf Rilla	Jorge Russek, Ofelia Medina		
La cámara del terror	Jack Hill	Boris Karloff, Julissa		
Las sicodélicas	Gilberto Martínez Solares	Isela Vega, Elizabeth Campbell, Amadee Chabot, Maura Monti		
Operación carambola	Alfredo Zacarías	Capulina, Chespirito, Alfonso Arau, Alicia Bonet		
El zángano	Agustín P. Delgado	Capulina, Chespirito, Jacqueline Andere, Nora Larraga "Karla", Carlos Lico		
Romeo contra Julieta	Julián Soler	Angélica María, Alberto Vázquez		
La cama	Emilio Gómez Muriel	Mauricio Garcés, Isela Vega, Zulma Faiad, Enrique Rocha, Lupita Ferrer		Co-production with Argentina.
Esclava del deseo	Emilio Gómez Muriel	Libertad Leblanc, Manuel López Ochoa, Carlos East, Juan Ferrara		
House of Evil	Jack Hill	Boris Karloff, Julissa		
El Tesoro de Moctezuma	René Cardona Jr.	El Santo, Amadee Chabot		
The Batwoman	René Cardona	Maura Monti, Roberto Cañedo		
No hay cruces en el mar	Julián Soler	Meche Carreño, Jaime Fernández		
Fando y Lis	Alejandro Jodorowsky	Sergio Klainer, Diana Mariscal		
La endemoniada		Libertad Leblanc, Enrique Rocha	Horror	A vampire film with nudity
El despertar del lobo	René Cardona Jr.	Silvia Pinal, Enrique Rambal, Maura Monti		
Las visitaciones del diablo	Alberto Isaac	Ignacio López Tarso, Enrique Lizalde, Gloria Marín, Pilar Pellicer		
Sor ye-ye	Tito Fernández	Hilda Aguirre, Enrique Guzmán, Sara García, Carmen Montejo	Musical	Co-production with Spain
Arruza	Budd Boetticher		Documentary	Co-production with the United States
Corazón salvaje	Tito Davison	Angélica María, Julio Alemán, Teresa Velázquez		
Cuatro contra el crimen	Sergio Véjar	Libertad Leblanc, Pedro Armendáriz Jr., Guillermo Murray, Blanca Sánchez		
Dos gemelas estupendas	Miguel Morayta	Pili and Mili, Alberto Vázquez		
Farewell to Marriage	Juan de Orduña			
Por mis pistolas	Miguel M. Delgado	Cantinflas, Isela Vega		
Santo en el tesoro de Drácula	René Cardona	El Santo, Aldo Monti, Noelia Noel		
The Adolescents	Abel Salazar	Luis Aragón		
