= Thálassa (2017 film) =

Thálassa: A Self-Portrait of Jorge Acha
- Thálassa, un autorretrato de Jorge Acha
- Directed by: Gustavo Bernstein; Carlos O. García; Alfredo Slavutzky
- Written by: Gustavo Bernstein
- Produced by: Asociación Civil Para La Difusión De La Obra De Jorge Luis Acha
- Narrated by: Gustavo Bernstein
- Cinematography: Alfredo Slavutzky
- Edited by: Gustavo Bernstein
- Music by: Guillermo Silveira
- Release date: 2017
- Running time: 105 minutes
- Country: Argentina
- Language: Spanish

Thálassa: A Self-Portrait of Jorge Acha (Spanish: Thálassa, un autorretrato de Jorge Acha) is a 2017 Argentine documentary film directed by Gustavo Bernstein, Carlos O. García, and Alfredo Slavutzky. The film portrays the artistic work and philosophy of Argentine painter, writer, and filmmaker Jorge Luis Acha (1946–1996), using a self-portrait approach where the subject narrates his own life and ideas.

The title references the Ancient Greek word Thálassa (the sea), a central mythic theme throughout Acha's artistic work.

== Synopsis ==
The documentary is structured around an intimate interview conducted with Acha in 1988 by film critics Rodrigo Tarruella and Carlos O. García. Moving away from a linear or pedagogical format, the director's testimony—delivered in a playful and reflective tone—explores his childhood moviegoing experiences, philosophical reflections, and views on art and cinema.

The narrative combines excerpts from Acha's feature films, paintings, poetic writings, and archival footage of his travels. The audiovisual survey includes his early short film Impasse (starring Leonor Manso) and his trilogy of feature films: Habeas Corpus, Standard (featuring Libertad Leblanc), and Mburucuyá, featuring actor Jorge Diez.

Film critics have noted that the documentary relies on the essay film format and found footage techniques instead of traditional expository methods. Instead of using film excerpts merely to illustrate Acha's words, the narrative sets up a counterpoint between his philosophical interview and autonomous visual excerpts addressing history, social memory, and identity.

In addition to screenings at Argentine festivals and cultural venues, the documentary has been presented internationally at institutions such as the Centro de Cultura Digital in Mexico.

== See also ==
- Habeas Corpus
- Standard
- Mburucuyá
- Jorge Luis Acha
