= S.O.S. Conspiración Bikini =

1967 film by René Cardona Jr.

- Directed by: René Cardona Jr.
- Screenplay by: René Cardona Jr.
- Story by: René Cardona Jr.
- Produced by: Carlos Espinoza; Alberto López; Pablo Ulloa
- Starring: Julio Alemán; Sonia Furió; Sonia Infante; Roberto Cañedo; Maura Monti; Noé Murayama; Carlos Agostí; Isela Vega
- Cinematography: Carl Carvahal (as J. Carlos Carbajal)
- Edited by: Alfredo Rosas Priego
- Music by: Ernesto Cortázar II
- Production company: Filmadora Panamericana
- Release date: 3 August 1967 (Mexico)
- Running time: 84 minutes
- Country: Mexico
- Language: Spanish

S.O.S. Conspiración Bikini (English: "S.O.S. Bikini Conspiracy") is a 1967 Mexican action and adventure film written and directed by René Cardona Jr., and starring Julio Alemán, Sonia Furió and Sonia Infante.This is the first part in a duology of films centered on the character of Alex Dinamo, the "Mexican James Bond", followed by Peligro... Mujeres en acción (1969).

== Plot ==
The Secret Organizational Service (S.O.S.) is an international crime syndicate that has been successful with their all-female agents operating under the guise of a fashion model agency led by Madame Bristol (Sonia Infante). Meanwhile, the International Service is the governmental secret service dedicated to put an end to SOS's actions. An agent has infiltrated SOS, but she is in danger after sending a coded message to her supervising inspector. As a result, the International Service sends their top agent, Alex Dinamo (Julio Alemán), alongside agent Adriana (Sonia Furió), to give the undercover agent a hand.

== Cast ==
- Julio Alemán as Alex Dinamo
- Sonia Furió as Adriana
- Sonia Infante as Madame Bristol
- Roberto Cañedo as Chief of the International Service
- Maura Monti as Lucrecia
- Noé Murayama as Uli, Bristol's assistant
- Grace Polit as SOS Undercover Agent
- Carlos Agostí as Luigi, Bristol's assistant
- Isela Vega as SOS Stage Director
- Lorraine Chanel as Madame Rapière
- Liza Castro as Bristol's assistant
- Juan Garza
- Lucho Gálvez
- Jorge Fegan

== Production and release ==
The film was shot in Ecuador, one of several Mexican film productions that were filmed in the country in the 1960s.

The film was released in Mexico on 3 August 1967, on the Roble and Carrusel cinemas, for two weeks.

== Reception ==
Héctor Trejo Sánchez Pinceladas de cine mexicano. La cultura popular mexicana retratada por el séptimo arte wrote positively about S.O.S. Conspiración Bikini and Peligro... Mujeres en acción, in particular about the latter, saying that Alex Dinamo was the most relevant character of the Mexican spy cinema, and that it was successful in giving James Bond "a Latin face" and "a Latin American spirit." In Breve historia del cine mexicano: primer siglo, 1897–1997, Emilio García Riera was less enthusiastic, however, when citing the film as an example, alongside El asesino se embarca (1967) and Cuatro contra el crimen (1968), of Mexican films made in the 1960s to cash in on the success of the James Bond films, referring to them as examples of "underdeveloped James Bond-ism."
