= Cuatro contra el crimen =

1968 film by Sergio Véjar

- Directed by: Sergio Véjar
- Screenplay by: Gabriel García Márquez; Alfredo Ruanova
- Story by: Fernando Galiana
- Produced by: Heberto Dávila Guajardo (executive producer); Jesús Sotomayor Martínez (producer)
- Starring: Libertad Leblanc; Pedro Armendáriz Jr. Guillermo Murray; Blanca Sánchez; Héctor Godoy; Víctor Junco; Fernando Luján
- Cinematography: Rosalío Solano
- Edited by: José W. Bustos
- Music by: Gustavo César Carrión (as Gustavo C. Carrion)
- Production company: Producciones Sotomayor
- Release date: 25 April 1968 (Mexico)
- Running time: 90 minutes
- Country: Mexico
- Language: Spanish

Cuatro contra el crimen (English: "Four Against Crime") is a 1968 Mexican action crime film directed by Sergio Véjar and starring Libertad Leblanc, Pedro Armendáriz Jr., Guillermo Murray, and Blanca Sánchez. Gabriel García Márquez contributed to the script.

== Plot ==
After the death of two heads of a criminal organization, four secret agents are commissioned to protect a third boss.

== Cast ==
- Libertad Leblanc as Nora
- Pedro Armendáriz Jr. as Gustavo
- Guillermo Murray as Enrique Ferrer
- Blanca Sánchez as Elena
- Héctor Godoy as Pablo
- Víctor Junco as Iván
- Fernando Luján as Peter
- Cynthia Mandan as Virginia Lascuráin
- Rubén Calderón as Chief
- Carlos Nieto as Luigi
- Roberto Y. Palacios as Chang
- Carlos León as Enrique Williams
- Julián de Meriche as Mr. Cortés (uncredited)
- Felipe del Castillo as Monk (uncredited)
- Jesús Gómez as Villain in Helicopter (uncredited)
- Ramiro Orci as Gas Station Attendant (uncredited)
- Ivan J. Rado as Smith (uncredited)
- Manuel Trejo Morales as Fake Monk (uncredited)
- Marcelo Villamil as Mr. Lascuráin (uncredited)

== Reception ==
In Breve historia del cine mexicano: primer siglo, 1897–1997, Emilio García Riera cited the film as an example, alongside S.O.S. Conspiración Bikini (1967) and El asesino se embarca (1967), of Mexican films made in the 1960s to cash in on the success of the James Bond films, referring to them as examples of "underdeveloped James Bond-ism."
