= Rosángela Balbó =

Argentinian actor

- Born: Rosa Angela Giovanna Balbó Rosso; April 16, 1941; Turin, Piedmont, Italy
- Died: November 3, 2011 (aged 70); Mexico City, Mexico
- Occupation: Actress
- Years active: 1961–2011

Rosángela Balbó (April 16, 1941 – November 3, 2011, born Rosa Angela Giovanna Balbó Rosso) was a Mexican-Italian born actress. She was better known for the Mexican films Entre Pobretones y Ricachones, Como Gallos de Pelea, Los que verán a Dios and Los hipócritas.

== Biography ==
Balbó was born April 16, 1941 Turin, Piedmont, Italy, the daughter of Félix Balbó and María Ana Rosso. She had a brother who died in an accident. As a consequence of the Second World War, in 1946, when she was 5 years old, with her family left Italy and settled in Argentina. As a child she dressed with her little friends and staged plays. She won a beauty contest that was performed on television as the "Reina de Villa del Parque". In this country she studied acting and made her debut in the Argentine film Amorina in 1961. This was followed by titles such as Buscando a Mónica, Los que verán a Dios and Los hipócritas. In 1967, she left Argentina and traveled to Mexico, where she finally settled, making her debut in the country in the film La perra, where she shared the scene with Julio Alemán and Carlos López Moctezuma.

She had many interests in telenovelas Pobre Clara, Juegos del destino, Alcanzar una estrella II, Acapulco, cuerpo y alma, Ángela, Tres mujeres, Siempre te amaré, Heridas de amor, and Las tontas no van al cielo. The last telenovelas in which she participated were Rafaela and La fuerza del destino.

== Death ==
In 2010 Balbó was diagnosed with lung cancer, because of this she left her smoking habit which consisted of two daily packs of cigarettes. Balbó recovered and continued working, although in 2011 the cancer resurfaced aggressively and lodged in her left lung. Although Balbó fought against her illness, she finally lost the battle, on November 3, 2011.

At the time of her death, Balbó served as president of the children nursery and kindergarten of ANDA, through the patronage of "Rosa Mexicano", where Rosángela had like friends to the actresses Yolanda Mérida and Marta Zamora.

She was veiled at a funeral parlor in Colonia San Rafael, and her remains were cremated and deposited inside an urn in a crypt near the ANDA building.

== Filmography ==
Films, Telenovelas, Television
Year	Title	Role	Notes
1961	Amorina		Film
1962	Buscando a Mónica		Film
1962	Dr. Cándido Pérez, señoras		Film
1962	Dar la cara		Film
1963	Los que verán a Dios		Film
1965	Los hipócritas		Film
1965	La industria del matrimonio		Film
1966	Villa Delicia: playa de estacionamiento, música ambiental		Film
1966	Hotel alojamiento		Film
1966	La gorda		Film
1966	Lucía		Film
1966	Las locas del conventillo		Film
1966	Ritmo, amor y juventud		Film
1967	La perra	Violeta	Film
1968	Crimen sin olvido		Film
1968	Matrimonio a la argentina		Film
1968	La cama	Mucama	Film
1969	La muñeca perversa		Film
1969	El bulín	Leticia	Film
1970	Tres amigos	Carmen	Film
1970	El hermano Capulina	Beatriz Morales	Film
1971	The Incredible Invasion	Martha - mayor's wife	Film
1971	La hora desnuda		Film
1971	Cristo negro		
1973	Entre pobretones y ricachones		Film
1974	Pistolero del diablo	Bertha	Film
1975	Pobre Clara	Lourdes	Special appearance
1978	El patrullero 777		Film
1981/82	Juegos del destino	Leticia	Supporting role
1985	Mi querida vecindad		Film
1988	El gran relajo mexicano		Film
1989	Pánico en el bosque		Film
1989	Bandas guerreras		Film
1989	Pobres ricos		Film
1989	Mi compadre Capulina		Film
1990	Mi vecina me fascina		Film
1990	Traficantes del vicio		Film
1990	El jardín de la paz		Film
1990	Dando y dando		Film
	Pacto de sinvergüenzas		Film
	Federal de narcóticos (División Cobra)		Film
	Alcanzar una estrella II	Mariana Castellar	Supporting role
1992	Carrusel de las Américas	Bertha	Supporting role
1993	Sueño de amor	Marcela	Special appearance
1993	Hoy no circula		Film
1994	Marimar	Eugenia	Special appearance
1994/06	Mujer, casos de la vida real	Herself	Various episodes
1995	María José		Special appearance
1995/96	Acapulco, cuerpo y alma	Claudia de San Román	Supporting role
1997	Jóvenes amantes	Juliana's mother	Film
1998	Aunque seas ajena		Film
1998	¿Qué nos pasa?	Herself	TV show
1998/99	Ángela	Esther Miranda Parra de Lizárraga	Supporting role
1999	Reclusorio 3		Film
1999/00	Tres mujeres	Rosa María Sánchez	Supporting role
2000	Siempre te amaré	Constanza de la Parra	Supporting role
2000	El precio de tu amor	Giovanna	Special appearance
2000	Por un beso	Dr. Guzmán	Special appearance
2001	Amigas y rivales	Magdalena de Morell	Supporting role
2002	La Otra	Socorrito	Recurring role
2002	Así son ellas	Martha de Corso	Recurring role
2002/03	Clase 406	Bertha Ponce	Recurring role
2004	Amy, la niña de la mochila azul	Doña Perpetua de Betancourt	Recurring role
2005	Sueños y caramelos	Magda	Recurring role
2005	Piel de otoño	Elvira Castañeda	Recurring role
2005/06	Barrera de amor	Cayetana Linares	Supporting role
2006	Heridas de amor	Rebeca Campuzano Vda. de Beltrán	Supporting role
2006	La fea más bella	Herself	Special appearance
2007	Destilando Amor	Josephine	Special appearance
2007/08	Al diablo con los guapos	Mrs. Corcuera	Special appearance
2008	Las tontas no van al cielo	Margarita Lizárraga de Molina	Supporting role
2008	Mujeres Asesinas	Giovanna	Season:1, Episode:2, "Mónica, acorralada"
2009	Camaleones	Marcela de Castillo	Recurring role
2009	Mar de amor	Estefanía Peralta	Recurring role
2009/10	Corazón salvaje	Inés de Villarreal	Recurring role
2011	Rafaela	Sara	Recurring role
2011	La fuerza del destino	Olga de los Santos	Special appearance

== Theatre ==
- Los árboles mueren de pie
- Monólogos de la vagina
- Mujeres juntas... ni difuntas
