= María Luisa Elío =

Spanish writer and actress

- Born: María Luisa Elío Bernal; 17 August 1926; Pamplona, Spain
- Died: 17 July 2009 (aged 82); Mexico City, Mexico
- Occupations: writer, actress
- Notable work: En el balcón vacío (The Empty Balcony) (Film)

María Luisa Elío Bernal (17 August 1926 – 17 July 2009) was a Spanish writer and actress exiled in Mexico. She wrote two books and the script of the award-winning autobiographical film El balcón vacío (The Empty Balcony), which was the first film to depict the lives of Spanish exiles during the Spanish Civil War. She also performed on Mexican television and Mexican films. Elío was involved in several cultural and literary circles. She was also an inspiration for Gabriel García Márquez. His masterwork One Hundred Years of Solitude was dedicated to Elío and her husband.

== Biography ==
Born in Pamplona on 17 August 1926, María Luisa was the third and last daughter of Luis Elío Torres and Carmen Bernal López de Lago, who had married in 1920.

Her father, a lawyer and judge, suffered for his left-wing tendencies during the Spanish Civil War in Pamplona and was imprisoned, but managed to escape. In late 1939 he was smuggled to the border, and after a brief time in the Gurs concentration camp, he made his way to Paris and was reunited with his family.

On February 16, 1940, they departed for Mexico. After arriving in Mexico, María Luisa studied drama with Magda Donato, Margarita Nelken's sister, at the Instituto Nacional de Bellas Artes. Months later, she attended the academy of Seki Sano, a Japanese exile living in Mexico. Octavio Paz, then director of the theater group Poesía en Voz Alta (Poetry Out Loud), invited her to join the troup. During that time, she worked closely with Juan José Arreola, Leonora Carrington, Carlos Fuentes, Juan García Ponce, Elena Garro, Luis Felipe Vivanco, Alfonso Reyes and Juan Soriano. In 1952, married Jomí García Ascot, also the child of exiles. Those who came to Mexico as children from Spain as exiles, are sometimes called The Nepantla Generation, a Nahuatl word which describes the state of belonging to two places at the same time. Neither of one, nor the other. Elío described herself as being caught between past and present.

In 1960, her husband was invited to go to Cuba and participate in a film, Cuba 58 being filmed there. Originally five segments were planned for the film, but the final composition contains only three, two of which were created by García Ascot. García planned a new project, a musical comedy in the style of West Side Story, but had to abandon the project as the political situation in Cuba deteriorated. The couple returned to Mexico. Based on a Elío's microfiction, she wrote the script of the first film about Spanish exiles recorded from the exile. The couple began working in a collaboration with Emilio García Riera to produce it.

In 1968, Elío and García Ascot divorced. In 1970, she took their son Diego (born 1963) with her and made her first return trip to Spain, where she stayed at García Márquez's house in Barcelona. As a result she would publish Tiempo de llorar in 1988. Her second book came out in 1995. Elío died in Coyoacán, Mexico City, on 17 July 2009.

== Creative work ==
Elío started writing her short-stories during her stay in Cuba. In Havana, she met the literary group Orígenes. In several interviews she noted that she started writing because of the explosive atmosphere of the Cuban Revolution and the supporting friends she found there, among others Eliseo Diego, Fina García Marruz, and Alejo Carpentier. Her literary work first appeared in Mexican newspapers and cultural magazines after her return from Cuba, when she was writing the screenplay for the autobiographical film The Empty Balcony. These publications are short stories and microfictions.

Her first book, Tiempo de llorar (Time to Weep), is an autobiographical narrative she began writing during her first trip back to Spain. In 1988, she published her experiences during this bittersweet return and the breakdown she suffered as a result.

Her second book, Cuaderno de apuntes en carne viva (Notebook in Living Flesh) published in 1995, attempted to explore the journey of putting her broken pieces back together.

The film, El balcón vacío (The Empty Balcony) is Elío's autobiographical story. She wrote the script of the film. She also acted in the film. Shooting only on weekends because the Elío, García Ascot, and García Riera all had regular jobs, the cult film took a year to be produced. Although it was not a commercial success, it did win international awards.

== Creative network ==
Elío was involved in various cultural and literary circles. As an active participant in a transnational creative network, Elío maintained a relationship with Spanish exiles, like José Bergamín, Luis Buñuel, José Gaos and especially Emilio Prados, who was a pivotal figure for her. She also made connections with the second generation of exiles, such as Carlos Blanco Aguinaga, José de la Colina, Vicente Gandía, Jomí García Ascot (her husband for 16 years), Emilio García Riera, Tomás Segovia and Ramón Xirau.

While in Havana, she established ties with Eliseo Diego, Fina García Marruz, Alejo Carpentier, Cintio Vitier, and most of the members of the literary group Orígenes.

Nonetheless, many of her cultural alliances originated in Mexico City, a diverse hub of nationals and displaced individuals who played a significant role in shaping post-revolutionary Mexico. Among the most relevant writers and artists, her circle included Leonora Carrington, Salvador Elizondo, Carlos Fuentes, Gabriel García Márquez, Álvaro Mutis, Octavio Paz, and Juan Soriano, among others.

Elío and her husband were personal friends of the writer Gabriel García Márquez. His masterwork, One Hundred Years of Solitude was dedicated to them with the inscription “para (to) jomí garcía ascot y maría luisa elío” (all in lowercase letters). In the eighteen months that the Colombian author took to write the book, they went to his house every night and critiqued the versions of the story as it developed. Elio's friendship with García Márquez continued over the years. When he moved to Spain in 1967, Gabriel and Mercedes hosted her at their home in Barcelona. Elio was also among those invited to the Nobel Prize ceremony in Stockholm in 1982.

== Awards ==
In 2007, the Spanish Government decorated María Luisa Elio Bernal with the Officer's Cross of the Order of Isabella the Catholic for her services to Spain.

== Selected works ==
- Tiempo de llorar, México, El Equilibrista, 1988.
- Cuaderno de apuntes en carne viva, México, El Equilibrista, 1995.
- Tiempo de llorar y otros relatos, Madrid, Turner, 2002.

== Filmography ==
- No matarás (1943)
- Girls Boarding School (1943)
- La guerra de los pasteles (1944)
- El jagüey de las ruinas (1945)
- En el balcón vacío (1961)
- Remedios Varo (1967) Narrator (voice)

== Literature ==
- Gambarte, Eduardo Mateo (2009). María Luisa Elío Bernal: la vida como nostalgia y exilio. Universidad de La Rioja, Servicio de Publicaciones. ISBN 978-84-96487-42-0.
