= Jorge Luis Acha =

Jorge Luis Acha (10 November 1946 – 12 October 1996) was an Argentine painter, writer, screenwriter, and film director. He directed the independent feature films Habeas Corpus (1986), Standard (1989), and Mburucuyá: Pictures of Nature (1996).

== Biography ==
Acha studied at the Escuela de Bellas Artes Beato Angélico and graduated in painting from the Escuela Nacional de Bellas Artes Prilidiano Pueyrredón in Buenos Aires. Influenced by 19th-century Romanticism, he defined himself as a "traveling painter." His landscapes—predominantly marine scenes—emphasized atmosphere and spiritual contemplation over realistic detail. While working across various media, he was particularly known for his watercolor technique.

During the 1970s and 1980s, Acha exhibited his artwork across Latin America and Europe, including shows at the Museo de Bellas Artes de La Plata, the Museu de Arte Moderna de São Paulo, the Museo de Arte Hispanoamericano in Quito, and Galería Praxis in Buenos Aires, as well as the International Biennial of Humour and Satire in Gabrovo and the International Graphic Art Exhibition in Bilbao. He received grants from the Fondo Nacional de las Artes and the Rockefeller Foundation. His paintings are held in public collections including the Museo Castagnino+macro in Rosario and the Museo de Arte Moderno de Buenos Aires (MAMBA).

== Filmography ==
Acha made his films outside commercial production channels and classical narrative structures. Critics view his features as allegorical essays that prioritize visual framing, symbolic montage, and audio counterpoint over plot development. Film researcher Jorge Sala notes that Acha adapted his background as a painter into cinema, creating visual sequences that move between individual and collective dreamlike states.

Central to Acha's work is what critic Gustavo Bernstein terms a "sudaca aesthetic"—a critical framing of Latin American identity that echoes Glauber Rocha's "aesthetics of hunger" and contrasts Indigenous, colonial, and Eurocentric worldviews. His trilogy explores the intersection of Catholic iconography and homoerotic desire, presenting the body as a site of both political repression and passion.

Sound acts as a core structural element in his films rather than background accompaniment. Dialogue remains sparse, while archival audio, ambient tracks, and musical themes contrast with the visuals to convey irony or political critique.

=== Feature films ===
==== Habeas Corpus (1987) ====
Released in 1986, Habeas Corpus was Acha's feature directorial debut. Set during the last Argentine military dictatorship, the film takes place almost entirely within a clandestine detention center, focusing on the interaction between a solitary guard and a political prisoner. The narrative contains no spoken dialogue, relying instead on a soundscape that overlays archival audio from Pope John Paul II's 1982 visit to Argentina against the silence of the cell.

Critic Gustavo Bernstein notes the film's homoerotic tension and its parallels with Jean Genet's short film Un chant d'amour, alongside literary echoes of Jorge Luis Borges's short story "The Writing of the God" ("La escritura del dios"). Festival retrospectives at the Viennale and the Festival des 3 Continents have highlighted how the film turns the prison cell into a ritual space merging Christian sacrificial iconography, political martyrdom, and sensory focus on the male form.

==== Standard (1989) ====
Standard (1989) is an allegorical film addressing Argentine political mythologies and the ideological aftermath of Juan Perón's death. The plot follows a group of construction workers attempting to build the Altar de la Patria, a monumental national mausoleum project proposed in 1974 by minister José López Rega.

Film critic Roger Koza describes the movie as a satirical look at national history, casting sex symbol Libertad Leblanc in an allegorical role as the nation. Visual elements include illustrations from the children's magazine Billiken, neoclassical statuary, and recurring close-ups of ant colonies representing organized labor.

==== Mburucuyá: Pictures of Nature (1996) ====
Completed shortly before Acha's death in 1996, Mburucuyá: Pictures of Nature is a visual essay inspired by the 1799–1804 South American expeditions of Prussian naturalist Alexander von Humboldt and French botanist Aimé Bonpland. The film juxtaposes European scientific rationalism and botanical taxonomy with Indigenous pre-Columbian worldviews and animism.

The central motif is the *mburucuyá* (passion flower), renamed by Spanish missionaries as a teaching tool for the Passion of Jesus. Through this symbol, Acha examines European language, religious colonization, and native culture. European festival retrospectives, including Seminci and the Viennale, have framed the work as a reflection on colonial history and Latin American cultural identity.

== Literary work ==
After Acha's death, his collected writings and screenplays were published in two volumes titled Escritos póstumos, expanding critical interest in his work beyond film.

=== Escritos póstumos, Vol. I (2012) ===
The first volume compiles three screenplays focused on European colonization, state violence, and Latin American identity. Homo-Humus deals with Alexander von Humboldt's South American travels and served as the conceptual foundation for his film Mburucuyá: Pictures of Nature; Blancos covers 19th-century military expansion and Indigenous displacement during the Conquest of the Desert; and San Michelín blends religious iconography with urban folklore in the neighborhood of La Boca.

=== Escritos póstumos, Vol. II (2014) ===
The second volume brings together three prose texts centered on homoeroticism, classical mythology, and the male body. In Amapola, Acha reimagines the legend of Saint George and the dragon in a dreamlike setting where antagonism turns into mutual homoerotic desire. Bocabajo explores bodily submission and institutional power dynamics, while Versus draws on Greek myth, athletic wrestling, and C. P. Cavafy's poem "Ithaca" to present physical combat as a prelude to intimacy.

== Legacy ==
Since the 2000s, Acha's work has been reassessed through international retrospectives. His films were featured at the Buenos Aires International Festival of Independent Cinema (BAFICI) in 2006, and screened at the Viennale, the Cinémathèque Française, the Festival des 3 Continents, the Filmoteca de Galicia, and Seminci.

In 2017, the collective critical volume Jorge Acha: una eztetyka sudaka was published, compiling analytical essays on his films, paintings, and writings. That same year saw the release of Thálassa: A Self-Portrait of Jorge Acha, un autorretrato de Jorge Acha, an essayistic documentary co-directed by Gustavo Bernstein, Carlos O. García, and Alfredo Slavutzky. Built from interviews and archival material, the film offers a retrospective look at Acha's career.
