= Jomí García Ascot =

- Born: José Miguel García Ascot; 24 March 1927; Tunis, Tunisia
- Died: 14 August 1986 (aged 59); Mexico City, Mexico
- Occupations: Writer, educator, filmmaker

Jomí García Ascot (24 March 1927 – 14 August 1986) was a poet, essayist, filmmaker, director and educator. Born in Tunisia, he was a Spanish exile who lived in Mexico.

== Biography ==
José Miguel García Ascot was born on 24 March 1927 in Tunis, Tunisia. The son of a Spanish diplomat, he spent his childhood traveling from Portugal to France to Belgium and Morocco.

Fleeing the Spanish Civil War with his parents, he arrived in Mexico in 1939 as an exile. García studied philosophy at the National Autonomous University of Mexico (UNAM), where in 1949, he founded the University Film Club and earned a Master's in 1951. He also co-founded La Revista Presencia (Presence Magazine), where he began publishing poetry and film critiques. He taught at UNAM as well as at the Mexico City College and the French Institute of Latin America (IFAL). In 1952, he married María Luisa Elío, another Spanish exile living in Mexico.

García collaborated with many publications, including Las Españas (The Spanish), a publication of exiles; the Boletín de la Unión de Intelectuales Españoles/México (Bulletin of the Union of Intellectuals Spanish / Mexico); México en la Cultura (Culture in Mexico); La Gaceta del Fondo de Cultura Economica (The Gazette of the Foundation of Economic Culture); Revista de la Universidad de México (Journal of the University of Mexico); and Prometeo (Prometheus). He was the director of the film magazine Cine Verdad, Telerevista y Cámara.

== Film career ==
Between 1953 and 1957, he was director of several documentaries collaborating on works significant to the history of Spanish-language film, including Raíces (Roots) by Benito Alazraki, which won an award at the 1953 Cannes Film Festival; Torero (1956), by Carlos Velo; Nazarín (1958), by Luis Buñuel; and Sonatas (1959) Juan Antonio Bardem. In 1958 he created, with his friends Jean-François Revel and José Luis González, the Mexican Cinema Club at the French Institute for Latin America (IFAL), which was highly regarded at the time. In 1956, he was invited to work on the production of Cine-Verdad (Cinema of Truth) with Manuel Barbachano Ponce.

In the early 1960s, a group of leftist scholars who were aspiring filmmakers formed what they dubbed Nuevo Cine (New Film). Members of the group included García Ascot, José de la Colina, Salvador Elizondo, Emilio García Riera, and Carlos Monsiváis, who served on the executive board. They were later joined by Jorge Ayala Blanco, Rafael Corkidi, Manuel González Casanova, Salomón Laiter, Paul Leduc, Manuel Michel, José Maria Sbert, and Tomás Pérez Turrent. The goal of the group was to revive and rejuvenate the stagnant Mexican film industry, which had no training facilities for young film aspirants, no archive, and no real interest in developing new talent.

In 1960, he was invited to go to Cuba and participate in a film, Cuba 58 being filmed there. He created two short films, Un Día de Trabajo (A Day of Work, 17 minutes), Los Novios (The Betrothed, 32 minutes) in 1961 which in 1962 were combined with a short, Año Nuevo (The New Year, 29 minutes) by Jorge Fraga to create Cuba 58. Originally five segments were planned for the film, but the final composition contains only these three. García began working on a new project, a musical comedy in the style of West Side Story, but had to abandon the project as the political situation in Cuba deteriorated. Returning to Mexico with his wife, García began working in a collaboration with her and Emilio García Riera to produce one of the first films about Spanish exiles. The film, El bacón vacío (The Empty Balcony) is the autobiographical story of García's wife, María Luisa Elío, who wrote the script of the film. Shooting only on weekends because the trio all had regular jobs, the film took a year to produce and was not a commercial success, though it did win awards.

He directed the short film Remedios Varo in 1967 (about the painter of the same name, Remedios Varo), which won a Golden Sombrero Award at the Second International Festival The film was narrated by his wife, but it was their last joint project, as they divorced in 1968. He wrote and directed the short El viaje (The Trip) in 1977, which was his only commercial film.

== Writing career ==
After his failure to make a commercial success of his film making, García returned to writing. Initially, he wrote poetry, publishing Un otoño en el aire (An Autumn in the Air) (1964), Estar aquí (Being Here) (1966), Seis poemas al margen (Six Poems at the Margin) (1972) and others. García wrote several non-fiction works, including essays on the story of the life of painter Roger von Gunten (1978) and another on the life of the poet, Baudelaire (1951). He also authored a book about music, Con la música por dentro (With the Music Inside) (1982). He also began working on a novel, La muerte empieza en Polanco (Death Begins in Polanco), which was published posthumously.

In 1965–66, García Ascot was a neighbor of the writer, Gabriel García Márquez. During the eighteen months that García Márquez worked on his book One Hundred Years of Solitude, García Ascot and his wife visited García Márquez's house each night and critiqued the story as it developed. García Márquez dedicated the book to the couple with the inscription "Para (to) Jomí García Ascot y María Luisa Elío".

García Ascot died in Mexico City on 14 August 1986.

== Selected works ==
García wrote both fiction and scholarly works, as well as poetry. His film, En el balcón vacío (In the Empty Balcony) won the Critics Award at the Locarno International Film Festival (1962) and Giano d'Oro in the Festival of Latin American Cinema of Sestri Levante (1963), though it was never shown commercially.

=== Books and articles ===
- Baudelaire, poeta existencial, thesis, Mexico (1951) (in Spanish)
- Haber estado allí, Monterey, México, (1970) (in Spanish)
- Roger von Gunten, biography, Mexico (1978) (in Spanish)
- Con la música por dentro, Mexico (1982) (in Spanish)
- Del tiempo y unas gentes, Mexico (1986) (in Spanish)
- La muerte empieza en Polanco, novel, Mexico (1987) (in Spanish)
- Tres pintores : Pablo Amor, Oscar Gutman, Gabriel Macotela, biography, Mexico (1987) (in Spanish)

=== Poetry ===
- Un otoño en el aire (1963) (in Spanish)
- Estar aquí (1967) (in Spanish)
- Seis poemas al margen (1972) (in Spanish)
- Un modo de decir (1975) (in Spanish)
- Poemas de amor perdido y encontrado y otros poemas (1977) (in Spanish)
- Antología personal (1984) (in Spanish)

=== Film ===
- Un Día de Trabajo, Cuba (1961) (in Spanish)
- Los Novios, Cuba (1961) (in Spanish)
- En el balcón vacío, Mexico (1961) (in Spanish)
- Remedios Varo, Mexico (1967) (in Spanish)
- El viaje, Mexico (1977) (in Spanish)
- El grupo nuevo cine, Mexico (1984) (in Spanish)

== Bibliography ==
- Bell-Villada, Gene H. (1 January 2010). García Márquez: The Man and His Work. Univ of North Carolina Press. ISBN 978-0-8078-9538-2.
- Cortés, Eladio (1992). Dictionary of Mexican Literature. Greenwood Publishing Group. p. 251. ISBN 978-0-313-26271-5.
