= Harassed =

Harassed may refer to:

- Harassment
- Harassed (1964 film) (Acosada), a 1964 Argentine film
- Harassed (1985 film) (Acosada), a 1985 Spanish film
- Harassed (2002 film) (Acosada), a 2002 Mexican film
