= Juegos del destino =

Mexican telenovela

- Genre: Telenovela; Drama
- Created by: Marissa Garrido; Arturo Moya Grau
- Written by: Valeria Phillips
- Directed by: Jorge Ortiz de Pinedo
- Starring: Lucy Gallardo; Guillermo Murray; Mónica Sánchez-Navarro; Otto Sirgo; Rocío Banquells; Enrique Novi
- Country of origin: Mexico
- Original language: Spanish
- No. of episodes: 160

Production
- Executive producer: Patricia Lozano
- Production locations: Mexico City, Mexico
- Running time: 30 minutes
- Production company: Televisa

Original release
- Network: Canal de las Estrellas
- Release: 1981 – 1982

Related
- Una limosna de amor; Al final del arco iris

Juegos del destino (English title: Games of Destiny) is a Mexican telenovela produced by Patricia Lozano for Televisa in 1981. It is an original story by Marissa Garrido and Arturo Moya Grau and adapted by Valeria Phillips.

In the first part of the telenovela Mónica Sánchez-Navarro and Otto Sirgo starred as the protagonists, while Lucy Gallardo starred as the main antagonist. In the second part, Rocío Banquells and Enrique Novi starred as the protagonists, while Macaria starred as the main antagonist.

== Cast ==
- Lucy Gallardo as Doña Rosario de Morantes
- Guillermo Murray as Don José Luis Morantes
- Mónica Sánchez-Navarro as Vanessa
- Otto Sirgo as José Luis Morantes Jr.
- Rocío Banquells as Sofía
- Enrique Novi as José Antonio
- Macaria as Hilda
- Guillermo Zarur as Don Guille
- Pedro Damián as Javier
- Rosángela Balbó as Leticia
- Lupita Pallás as Josefina
- Martha Ofelia Galindo as Carmen
- Rosa María Moreno as Cristina
- Alejandra Peniche as Laura
- Alejandro Camacho as Álvaro
- Yolanda Vidal as María
- Lucía Guilmáin as Gabriela
- Carlos Petrel as Dr. Quiroz
- Ana Patricia Rojo as Vanessa (child)
- Mario Sauret as Fidencio
- Pamela Méndez as Antonieta
- Edgardo Gazcón as José Antonio (child)
- Karla Petrel as Sofía (child)
- Raúl Meraz as Bernardo
- Maricarmen Martinez as Catalina
- Raquel Pankowsky as Teresa
- Héctor Kiev as Marcos
- José Alberto Rodríguez as Rodrigo
- César Arias as Benito
- Enrique Beraza as Armando
