= La venus maldita =

- Directed by: Alfredo B. Crevenna; Adolfo García Videla
- Produced by: Alfonso Rosas Priego
- Starring: Libertad Leblanc; Héctor Godoy; Guillermo Murray
- Distributed by: Instituto Nacional de Cinematografia Argentína
- Release date: 11 May 1967
- Running time: 84 minute
- Country: Argentina
- Language: Spanish

La venus maldita (The Damned Venus) is a 1967 Argentine and Mexican erotic drama film directed by Alfredo B. Crevenna. The film was entirely shot in Peru, mostly in Lima but with location shots in Ancón, Cuzco, and Machu Picchu. La venus maldita was one of thirteen coproductions filmed and shown in Peru between 1962 and 1970.

== Plot ==
Gustavo Fernández (Héctor Godoy) suffers from an illness which he seeks to keep secret. While he is being treated, he falls in love with Ana (Libertad Leblanc), his nurse, and the pair eventually marry. Following the honeymoon, Gustavo is again bedridden and insists that his best friend, Rafael (Guillermo Murray), and Ana go out and have fun together. His domineering mother (Bertha Moss), and the feelings that develop between Ana and Rafael, threaten Gustavo's long-sought happiness.

== Cast ==
- Libertad Leblanc as Ana
- Guillermo Murray as Rafael Carral
- Héctor Godoy as Gustavo Fernandez
- Bertha Moss as Beatriz
- Luis Álvarez as Presentador
- Edwin Mayer as Inspector Mayer
- Alicia Maguiña
