= Seis días para morir =

- Starring: David Reynoso, José Elías Moreno, Joaquín Cordero, Libertad Leblanc, José Gálvez, Germán Valdés "Tin-Tan", Lucha Villa, Fernando Soler, Sara García, Adriana Roel
- Release date: 1967
- Running time: 90 minutes
- Country: Mexico
- Language: Spanish

Seis días para morir ("Six Days to Die") is a 1967 Mexican suspense and mystery film directed by Emilio Gómez Muriel and starring David Reynoso, José Elías Moreno, Joaquín Cordero, Libertad Leblanc and José Gálvez. This film also features special appearances of Germán Valdés "Tin-Tan", Lucha Villa, Fernando Soler, Sara García and Adriana Roel.
