= La flor de Irupé =

1962 film

La Flor de Irupé
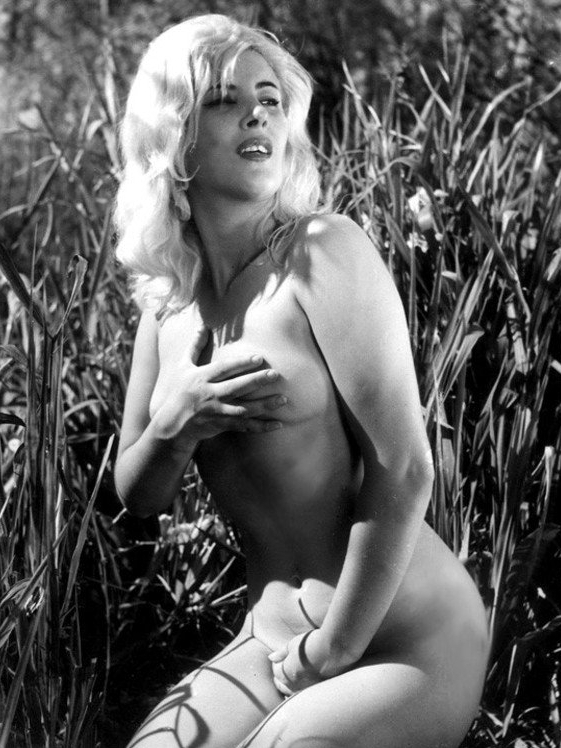
- Libertad Leblanc in a scene from the film
- Directed by: Alberto Du Bois
- Written by: Alberto Diego; Alberto Du Bois
- Produced by: Emilio Spitz
- Starring: Libertad Leblanc; Luis Alarcón; Héctor Pellegrini
- Cinematography: Juan Levaggi
- Edited by: Rosalino Caterbetti
- Music by: Amadeo Monges
- Release date: 1962
- Running time: 65 minutes
- Country: Argentina
- Language: Spanish

La flor de Irupé ("The Irupé Flower"), also known as La flor desnuda ("The Naked Flower") and Love Hunger, is a 1962 black-and-white Argentine erotic crime drama film directed by Alberto Dubois and starring Libertad Leblanc, Luis Alarcón and Héctor Pellegrini. The title is inspired by a Guarani legend about the maiden associated with the Irupé flower. This was Leblanc's first leading role, and the film helped her to achieve international stardom. It was originally released in Argentina's cinemas on October 4, 1962.

La flor de Irupé gained attention for its daring inclusion of nudity, unusual for its time, and the undeniable physical allure of the lead character. This bold approach contributed to its success at the box office, propelling 24-year-old Libertad Leblanc to become a prominent sex symbol of the era, particularly in Argentina and Mexico.

== Synopsis ==
Three bank robbers, on the run after a heist, stumble upon a secluded hut in the Iberá wetlands. The cabin is already inhabited by an old trapper, a hermit, and an eccentric man. Seeking refuge, the fugitives decide to lie low there. As days pass, boredom and a lack of female company make them uneasy. One evening, Roberto, one of the criminals, discovers a beautiful blonde girl bathing naked in the river. Intrigued, he shares the encounter with his partners. The old trapper then narrates the local legend of "La flor de Irupé/The Irupé Flower", a ghostly maiden who appears in the river during full moons, seeking to reunite with her dead husband. Despite the unsettling story, the criminals remain skeptical. However, days later, Roberto encounters the girl again, revealing her name as Marta, a real and living person. The two form a romantic connection, but soon complications arise for both of them.

== Cast ==
- Libertad Leblanc ... Marta
- Luis Alarcón ... Roberto
- Héctor Pellegrini ... El ladrón (The Thief)
- Mario Amaya ... Indio (The Indian)
- Héctor Carrión ... El Sapo (The Toad)
- Alberto Barcel ... Don Lucas
- Mario Casado
- Amelia Folcini
- Jorge L. Fossati
- Carlos García

== Alternative color version ==
The reissued video of the film by Something Weird Video —released in the Twisted Sex series, Vol. 18 (1998)— features a 12-minute color sequence narrating the old man's story. As the original film was entirely shot in black and white, Something Weird Video added this recent color sequence for the trailer and promotional poster only. La flor de Irupé is now cataloged by Something Weird Video under the international title Love Hunger. The website notes its U.S. release in 1965, three years after its actual debut in Argentina.
