= Deliciously Amoral =

1969 film by Julio Porter

- Directed by: Julio Porter
- Written by: Abilio Pereira de Almeida (story), Julio Porter, César Tiempo
- Cinematography: Mario Pagés
- Music by: Lucio Milena
- Release date: 27 February 1969
- Running time: 104 minutes
- Country: Argentina
- Language: Spanish

Deliciously Amoral (Spanish: Deliciosamente amoral) is a 1969 Argentine sex comedy film directed by Julio Porter, starring Libertad Leblanc, Guillermo Bredeston, and Rodolfo Onetto.

== Cast ==
- Libertad Leblanc
- Guillermo Bredeston
- Myriam de Urquijo
- Rodolfo Onetto
- Roberto Airaldi
- Guillermo Battaglia
- Héctor Méndez
- Maurice Jouvet
- Horace Lannes
- Osvaldo Brandi
