= Fuego en la sangre (1966 film) =

- Release date: 1966
- Running time: 75 minute
- Country: Argentina
- Language: Spanish

Fuego en la sangre is a 1966 Argentine film directed by René Cardona Jr. and starring Libertad Leblanc, Julio Aldama, Guillermo Battaglia, and Raúl del Valle. It premiered on March 11, 1965.

== Plot summary ==
In a rural setting, the story of a woman juggling numerous romantic pursuits.

== Cast ==
- Libertad Leblanc
- Julio Aldama
- Guillermo Battaglia
- Raúl del Valle
- Carmen Jimenez
- Eduardo Bener
- José Orange
