= Adriana Roel =

Mexican actress (1934–2022)

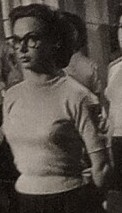
- Roel in Escuela de Verano (1959)
- Born: 5 July 1934; Monterrey, Nuevo León, Mexico
- Died: 4 August 2022 (aged 88)
- Occupation: Actress
- Spouse: José Antonio López de Gyves

Adriana Roel (5 July 1934 – 4 August 2022) was a Mexican actress from the Golden Age of Mexican cinema. Her roles included the Mexican telenovela Huracán.

== Partial filmography ==
- Mi esposa me comprende (1959)
- Gutierritos (1959) - Elena
- Escuela de verano (1959) - Matilde Moreno
- Verano violento (1960) - Irene Linares
- El misterio de la cobra (Carlos Lacroix en la India) (1960) - Betty MacAlpine
- La cigüeña dijo sí (1960)
- Chucho el Roto (1960)
- Los jóvenes (1961) - Alicia
- Aventuras de Chucho el Roto (1961)
- La captura de Chucho el Roto (1961)
- La entrega de Chucho el Roto (1962)
- Me dicen el consentido (1962)
- Autumn Days (Dias de Otono) (1963) - Alicia
- Cri Cri el grillito cantor (1963) - Chacha Adulta
- Furia en el Edén (1964) - Alma
- Me llaman el cantaclaro (1964) - Marta
- El asesino invisible (1965) - Adriana Green
- Un hombre en la trampa (1965) - Cristina
- The She-Wolf (1965) - Alicia Fernandez
- Viva Maria! (1965) - Janine
- El alazán y el rosillo (1966) - Juliana
- Gigantes planetarios (1966) - Silvia
- El planeta de las mujeres invasoras (Planet of the Female Invaders) (1966) - Silvia
- El derecho de nacer (1966) - Mujer embarazada
- Serenata en noche de luna (1967) - Julia
- El silencioso (1967) - Amparo
- Seis Días para Morir (La Rabia) (1967) - Marta
- Sor Ye Ye (1968) - Sor Inocente
- La endemoniada (1968) - Berta
- El caudillo (1968) - Margarita
- 24 Horas de Vida (1968) - Licha
- El Hijo Prodigo (1968) - Rosalva
- Gregorio and His Angel (1970) - (uncredited)
- Rubí (1970) - Eloísa
- La chamuscada (1971) - Laurita
- Fin de fiesta (1972) - Marta
- Kaliman - El Hombre Increible (1972) - Alice
- Diamantes, oro, y amor (1973) - Elsa
- Renuncia por motivos de salud (1976) - Silvia
- Alucarda (Sisters of Satan) (Innocents from Hell) (Mark of the Devil 3) (1977)) - Sister Germana
- Flores de papel (1978) - Esposa de Trejo
- Anacrusa (1979) - Victoria
- Corrupción oficial (1980)
- La seducción (1981)
- El diablo y la dama (1984)
- Las asesinas del panadero (1989)
- De muerte natural (1996) - Esperanza
- Crónica de un desayuno (2000) - Doña Lupe
- Amor letra por letra (2008)
- No quiero dormir sola (She Doesn't Want to Sleep Alone) (2012) - Dolores
