= Roger von Gunten =

Swiss-born Mexican artist (1933–2026)

- Von Gunten in a 2022 social media photo
- Born: 29 March 1933; Zurich, Switzerland
- Died: 18 February 2026 (aged 92); Tepoztlán, Morelos, Mexico
- Occupation: Artist
- Years active: 1956–2026

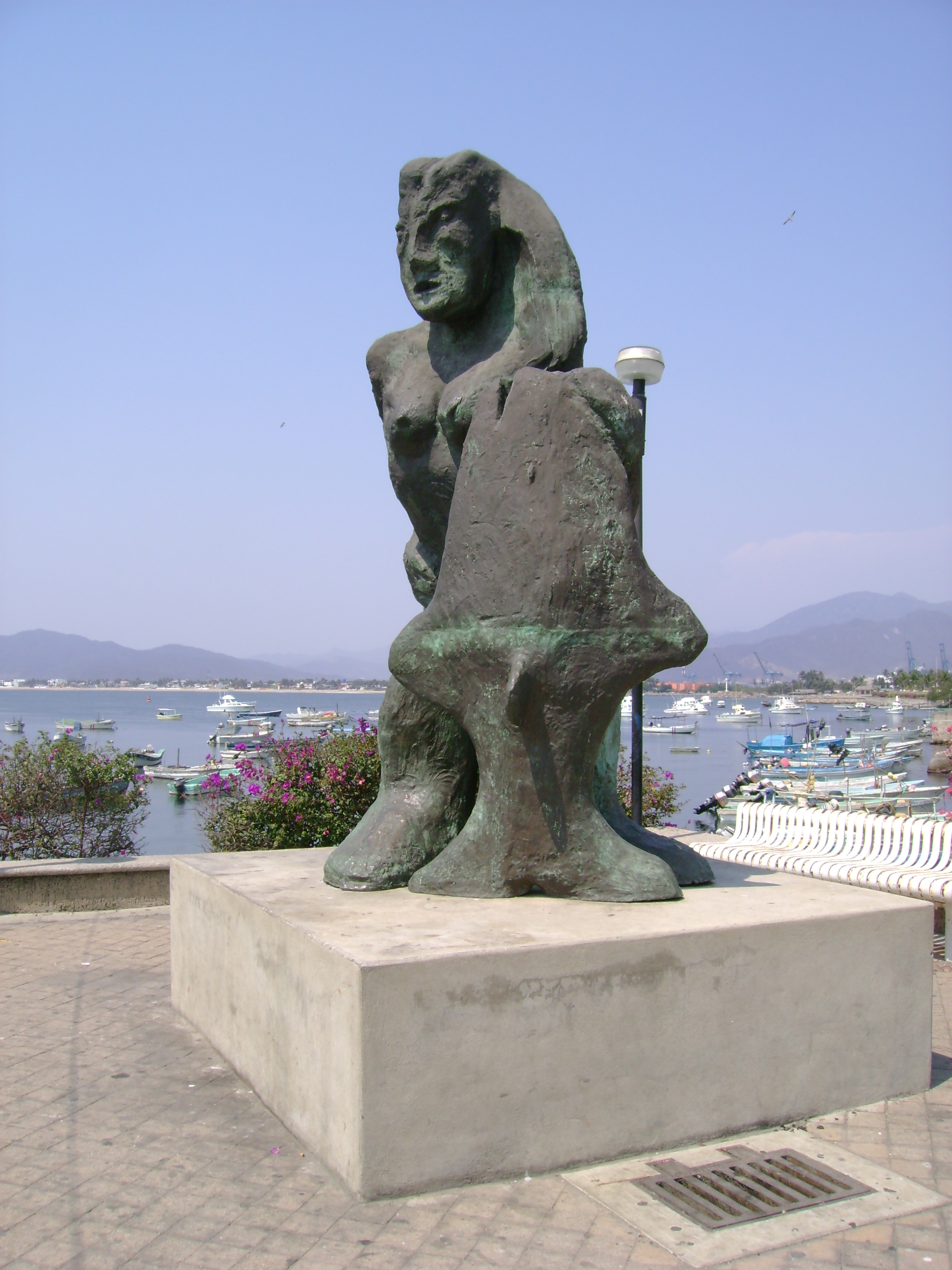
La pescadora, sculpture by Roger Von Gunten located in Manzanillo, Colima, Mexico

Roger von Gunten (29 March 1933 – 18 February 2026) was a Swiss-born Mexican artist and sculptor. He was the subject of a 1978 essay by Jomí García Ascot and was part of the Breakaway Generation which emerged after World War II ending the Mexican Muralist era. For over a decade, he was involved in a legal battle over who defines what is art. He participated in over 200 national and international art exhibitions and won the 2014 Fine Art Medal from Mexico.

== Life and career ==
Roger von Gunten was born in Zurich, Switzerland, on 29 March 1933. He was a student at the Kunstgewerbeschule (School of Arts and Crafts) in Zurich studying under Johannes Itten, a color theorist of the Bauhaus school. He held his first solo show in Switzerland in 1956. In 1957, he came to Mexico with a plan to travel on south along the newly opened Pan-American Highway, but he ran out of money and stayed in Mexico. He initially studied etching at the Universidad Iberoamericana with Guillermo Silva Santamaria in Mexico City, but having little love for city life, soon moved to Tacámbaro in the state of Michoacán. Later, he moved to a home on the slopes of Tepozteco Mountain near the village of Tepoztlán, in Morelos.

He was a part of the movement known as Generación de la Ruptura (Breakaway Generation) who turned their back on the Mexican muralism of the previous storied group of painters. It was a move away from formulaic social expression toward more personal abstract expression of forms. Von Gunten's artwork is generally divided into three periods. The early period, which lasted through the 1970s was more painterly, impressionistic and playful, transforming the landscape with a blue-green palette of joyful expression. His middle period in the mid-1980s was dark with smudges of color. A palette of black, blue and crimson tones merged with text in collages aimed to depict the anger of a volcano or disgust with war. From the 1990s on, his work became a representation of imaginary forms of nature depicted in whimsical, imaginative ways. Von Gunten used yoga to assist in his creative process and his latter works evoke Hindu thought and spirituality.

Von Gunten became a naturalized Mexican citizen in 1980. In 1982, he signed a contract with Serapión Fernández Stark, who was to promote von Gunten's work through Impulsora Art-Lat which later became Promotora de Arte Pictórico (Pictorial Art Promoters). In 1986, Art-Lat began to break its promises and unfulfill the terms signed in the contracts, so von Gunten became dissatisfied with the distribution of his work and refused to deliver any more paintings. Stark demanded fulfillment of the contractual terms and a legal battle ensued.

Initially von Gunten was ordered to pay Stark in paintings and not cash, so he painted 19 paintings to satisfy the judgment. Stark refused to accept the paintings, claiming that the style was not typical of von Gunten's work. The ensuing litigation dragged out for more than a decade. In 1994, 90 artists and intellectuals backed von Gunten's art and arranged an exhibit to display his works hanging alongside their own. At issue was whether artists have the right to free expression or whether critics, art dealers, or the courts determine the definition of art. On 10 November 1998, a district judge revoked the federal recognition that had accepted that the 19 paintings, known as Espejo (the Mirror), were satisfactory to settle the judgment. Von Gunten, who had left Mexico for a year of study in Indonesia when the paintings were accepted, called for another review on 9 April 1999. In 2001, von Gunten lost the 9th appeal and was ordered to sell his home in settlement of the debt.

A retrospective of his works was presented at the Palacio de Bellas Artes in 1989, containing over 200 of his works. In 1991, he created the scenery for the opera by Daniel Catán La hija de Rapaccini ("The Daughter of Rapaccini") which was performed at the Bellas Artes. In 1993, von Gunten became a member of the National System of Art Creators, Conaculta-Fonca. His work has been the subject of numerous solo and group exhibitions both nationally and internationally and lectured throughout the Mexican Republic.

Von Gunten was the subject of several literary works. In 1978, he was the subject of an essay written by Jomí García Ascot. In 1999, Santiago Espinosa de los Monteros published Roger Von Gunten: La Inocente Precision del Caos and in 2004, Silvia Cherem included him in her book Trazos y revelaciones: entrevistas a diez artistas mexicanos. He received the Fine Arts Medal 2014 in a ceremony at the Palacio de Bellas Artes in Mexico City.

Von Gunten died in Tepoztlán, Morelos, on 18 February 2026, at the age of 92.
