= Habeas Corpus (1987 film) =

- Directed by: Jorge Luis Acha
- Written by: Jorge Luis Acha
- Starring: Jorge Diez; Luis Nieto; Oscar Vernales
- Cinematography: José Luis Celeiro
- Edited by: Jorge Luis Acha
- Music by: Guillermo Silveira
- Production company: El Jaguar Cooperativa de Trabajo Cinematográfico ARENA
- Release date: 1987
- Running time: 67 minutes
- Country: Argentina
- Language: Spanish

Habeas Corpus is a 1987 Argentine experimental feature film written, directed, and edited by Jorge Luis Acha. Produced independently in 1987, the film never received a traditional commercial theatrical release. It won the Best Director award (shared with Víctor Dinenzon) at the Bariloche First Feature Film Festival in 1988.

== Critical analysis and reception ==
Set during the last Argentine military dictatorship, the film takes place almost entirely inside a clandestine detention center, focusing on the interaction between a solitary prison guard and a bound political prisoner. The narrative features no spoken dialogue, relying instead on a soundscape that overlays archival audio from Pope John Paul II's 1982 visit to Argentina against the silence of the cell.

In his analysis of the film's political and semiotic dimensions, critic Juan Pablo Bertazza highlights two central recurring symbols: the fish—an early Christian emblem—and the highway, representing urban infrastructure during the military regime. He suggests that juxtaposing these elements points to complicity between sectors of the Catholic Church and the repressive government, set against a society indifferent to the clandestine torture occurring below ground level.

The film also draws a parallel between the prisoner's captivity during Holy Week and the Passion of Christ. This theological-political framing relies on liturgical and intertextual motifs, including the Sator Square palindrome inscribed on the cell walls as a hermetic symbol of liberation, alongside references to Jack London's novel The Star Rover, where physical confinement yields to metaphysical escape.

Critic Gustavo Bernstein notes the film's homoerotic tension and its dialogue with Jean Genet's short film Un chant d'amour, as well as literary echoes of Jorge Luis Borges's short story "The Writing of the God" ("La escritura del dios").

Retrospectives at international festivals, including the Viennale and the Festival des 3 Continents, have emphasized how the work turns the prison cell into a ritual space where Christian sacrificial iconography, political martyrdom, and sensory focus on the male form intersect.

== Cast ==
- Jorge Diez
- Luis Nieto
- Oscar Vernales

== Bibliography ==
- Bernstein, Gustavo (2017). Jorge Acha: una eztetyka sudaka (in Spanish). Buenos Aires: Ítaca Ediciones. ISBN 978-987-45493-5-8.
- Manrupe, Raúl; Portela, María Alejandra (2001). Un diccionario de films argentinos (1930-1995) (in Spanish). Buenos Aires: Editorial Corregidor. p. 265. ISBN 950-05-0896-6.
