= Rodolfo Onetto =

Argentine actor

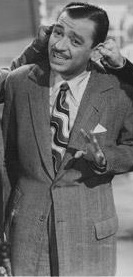

Rodolfo Onetto (19 May 1913 – 30 April 1983) was an Argentine actor. He was born in Santiago, Chile in 1913 but he emigrated to Argentina. He died in April 1983 (complications from Parkinson) in Buenos Aires. He starred in the 1962 film Una Jaula no tiene secretos.

== Films ==
Year	Title
1946	El tercer huésped
1948	Hoy cumple años mamá
1950	Juan Mondiola
1950	Piantadino
1952	Marido de ocasión
1953	Honour Your Mother
1954	Sábado del pecado
1959	Angustia de un secreto
1961	La sed (Hijo de hombre)
1961	Rebelde con causa
1962	Bajo un mismo rostro
1962	El televisor
1962	Mañana puede ser verdad (TV series)
1962	Una jaula no tiene secretos
1962	Los viciosos
1963	Pesadilla
1964	Extraña ternura
1964	Sombras en el cielo
1964	The Escaped
1965	La pérgola de las flores
1965	Los hipócritas
1965	Ritmo nuevo y vieja ola
1965	Santiago querido!
1969	Ciclo Myriam de Urquijo (TV series)
1969	Deliciously Amoral
1971	El ángel de la muerte (TV movie)
1971	El vendedor de ilusiones (TV movie)
1972	Basuras humanas
1972	Había una vez un circo
1972	Olga, la hija de aquella princesa rusa
1972	La bastarda
1973	¡Quiero besarlo señor!
1973	Los padrinos
1973	Vení conmigo
1974	Yo tengo fe
1975	Las procesadas
1976	The Kids Grow Up
1977	Crazy Women
1977	Such Is Life
1978	La mamá de la novia
1979	Cantaniño cuenta un cuento
1979	Las Locuras del profesor
1979	Los drogadictos
1979	Vivir con alegría
1980	My Family's Beautiful!
1981	Ritmo, amor y primavera
1981	Sucedió en el fantástico circo Tihany
