= Victoria (1972 film) =

- Directed by: José Luis Ibáñez
- Written by: Henry James (novel); Jorge Fons; José Luis Ibáñez
- Produced by: Fanny Cano; Julissa; Jaime Valdés
- Starring: Julissa; Guillermo Murray; Enrique Álvarez Félix
- Cinematography: Raúl Domínguez
- Edited by: Sergio Soto
- Music by: Benito Raúl Ibarra
- Production companies: Estudios América; Producciones Cinematográficas Trío
- Release date: 8 June 1972
- Running time: 89 minutes
- Country: Mexico
- Language: Spanish

Victoria is a 1972 Mexican drama film produced by Fanny Cano and Julissa, co-written and directed by José Luis Ibáñez, and starring Julissa, Guillermo Murray and Enrique Álvarez Félix. It is an adaptation of Henry James' 1880 novel Washington Square.

== Cast ==
- Julissa
- Guillermo Murray
- Enrique Álvarez Félix
- Rita Macedo
- Gilberto Román
- Beatriz Sheridan
- Helena Rojo
- Rebeca Iturbide
- Armando Sáenz
- Silvia Mariscal
- Octavio Ocampo
- Arsenio Campos
- Gloria Leticia Ortiz
- Athenea Baker
- Cecilia Leger
- Rocío Palacios
- Ana Martín

== Bibliography ==
- Annick Duperray. The reception of Henry James in Europe. Continuum, 2006.
