= Hoy cumple años mamá =

- Directed by: Ignacio Domínguez Riera
- Written by: Roberto A. Tálice; Eliseo Montaine
- Produced by: Irupé Films
- Starring: Susana Freyre; Alberto Bello; Ignacio de Soroa; Nelly Duggan; Luis Rodrigo
- Edited by: Oscar Carchano
- Music by: George Andreani
- Release date: 14 July 1948
- Running time: 85 minutes
- Country: Argentina
- Language: Spanish

Hoy cumple años mamá (transl. Today it's mom's birthday) is a 1948 Argentine comedy film of the classical era of Argentine cinema, directed by Ignacio domínguez Riera and written by Roberto A. Tálice and Eliseo Montaine. It was premiered on July 14, 1948.

The film is about a widow who will wed with one of her daughter's pretenders.

== Cast ==
- Olinda Bozán
- Fernando Cortés
- Rodolfo Onetto
- Inda Ledesma
- Carlos Enríquez
- Antonia Volpe
- Jacinto Aicardi
- Dedé Contestábile
- Agustín Barrios
- Gaby Guerrico
- Julio Durand
- Claudio Rodríguez Leiva
