= La endemoniada =

La Endemoniada
- Directed by: Emilio Gómez Muriel
- Written by: Alfredo Ruanova
- Starring: Libertad Leblanc
- Release date: 20 June 1968
- Running time: 83 minutes
- Country: Mexico
- Language: Spanish

La Endemoniada (aka A Woman Possessed) is a 1968 Mexican horror film directed by Emilio Gómez Muriel and starring Libertad Leblanc.

== Cast ==
- Libertad Leblanc as female vampire
- Enrique Rocha
- Juan Miranda
- Agustín Martínez Solares
- Adriana Roel as Berta
- María del Carmen Rodríguez Morquecho
- Carlos Cortés as Ricardo
- Rogelio Guerra
- Norma Lazareno as the first victim
- Arturo Martínez
- Guillermo Rivas
- José Baviera
- Bertha Moss
- Nora Larraga 'Karla'
- Eduardo MacGregor

== See also ==
- The Female Vampire (Spanish horror film)
