= Standard (1989 film) =

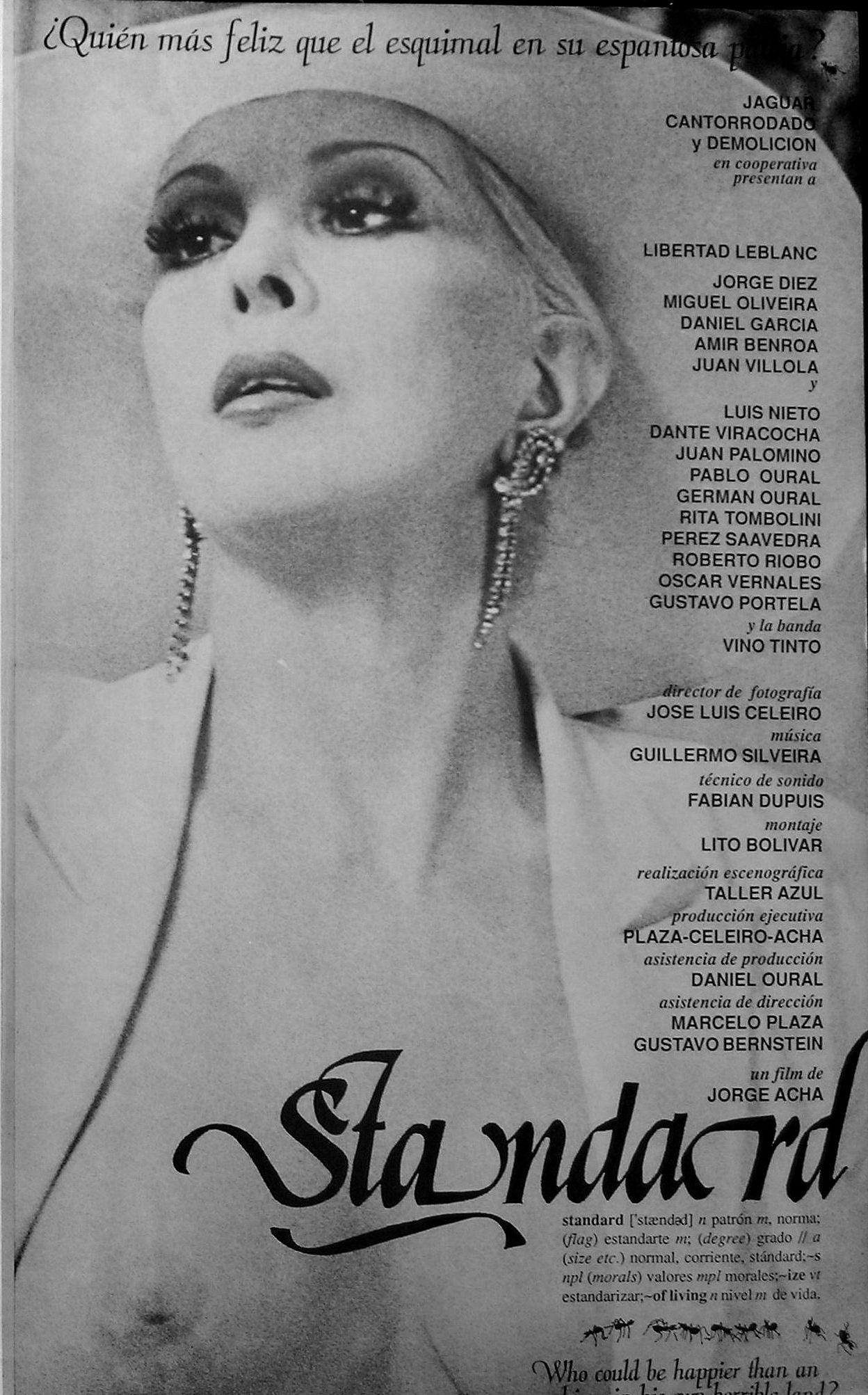
- Directed by: Jorge Luis Acha
- Written by: Jorge Luis Acha
- Starring: Libertad Leblanc; Juan Palomino; Jorge Diez; Miguel Oliveira; Amir Benroa
- Cinematography: José Luis Celeiro
- Edited by: Jorge Luis Acha
- Music by: Guillermo Silveira
- Production companies: El Jaguar Cooperativa de Trabajo Cinematográfico; Cantorrodado Cooperativa Demolición
- Release date: 1989
- Running time: 85 minutes
- Country: Argentina
- Language: Spanish

Standard is a 1989 Argentine experimental feature film written, directed, and edited by Jorge Luis Acha. Produced independently in 1989, the film starring Libertad Leblanc, Juan Palomino, Jorge Diez, Miguel Oliveira, and Amir Benroa never received a traditional commercial theatrical release.

== Plot and conceptual analysis ==
Standard is an allegorical film addressing Argentine political mythologies and the ideological crisis following the death of Juan Perón in 1974. The premise centers on the monumental mausoleum project conceived by Minister of Social Welfare José López Rega: the Altar de la Patria (Altar of the Fatherland), designed to house iconic national figures and promote an official "metaphysics" of Argentine identity.

Acha deconstructs this myth through a group of construction workers building—and ultimately ruining—the monument in a vacant lot. The narrative creates tension between the laborers' daily routines and the authoritarian design of the project. While allegorically framed as ants destined to build the nation's greatness anonymously, the workers' actions break down this architectural mission, pointing to the historical impossibility of an authoritarian national project that leaves no room for dissent.

Film critic Roger Koza describes the movie as a satire of official national history, casting mainstream cinema star Libertad Leblanc as a kitsch allegory of the fatherland. The visual montage incorporates illustrations from the children's magazine Billiken, neoclassical statuary, and recurring close-ups of ant colonies as a metaphor for collective labor.

Researcher Magalí Mariano interprets Leblanc's character as an anima or archetype of collective seduction, moving between iconographic roles ranging from Marianne to Eugène Delacroix's Liberty Leading the People—a visual device similar to Werner Schroeter's use of her in his 1986 documentary De l'Argentine. This analysis contrasts that archetypal framework with Maurice Maeterlinck's essay The Life of the Ant, drawing an analogy in which the working-class community acts like an ant colony that adopts a "surrogate queen"—a fair-skinned, blonde divinity—leading to cultural disorientation and ultimate ruin.

== Cast ==
- Libertad Leblanc
- Juan Palomino
- Jorge Diez
- Miguel Oliveira
- Amir Benroa
- Daniel García
- Juan Villola
- Luis Nieto
- Alberto Pérez Saavedra
- Gustavo Portela
- Oscar Vernales
- Roberto Riobo
- Dante Viracocha
- Pablo Oural
- Germán Oural

== Bibliography ==
- Bernstein, Gustavo (2017). Jorge Acha: una eztetyka sudaka (in Spanish). Buenos Aires: Ítaca Ediciones. ISBN 978-987-45493-5-8.
- Manrupe, Raúl; Portela, María Alejandra (2001). Un diccionario de films argentinos (1930-1995) (in Spanish). Buenos Aires: Editorial Corregidor. p. 548. ISBN 950-05-0896-6.
