= El asesino se embarca =

1967 film by Miguel M. Delgado

- Directed by: Miguel M. Delgado
- Written by: Alfredo Ruanova
- Produced by: Felipe Subervielle
- Starring: Enrique Lizalde; Regina Torné; Armando Silvestre; Tito Junco; Jorge Russek
- Cinematography: Gabriel Figueroa
- Production company: Clasa Films Mundiales
- Release date: 31 August 1967 (Mexico)
- Running time: 85 minutes
- Country: Mexico
- Language: Spanish

El asesino se embarca (English: "The Assassin Goes on Board") is a 1967 Mexican action thriller film directed by Miguel M. Delgado and starring Enrique Lizalde, Regina Torné, Armando Silvestre, Tito Junco and Jorge Russek.

The film's sets were designed by art director Manuel Fontanals.

== Plot ==
A police officer unlucky with women is on a ferry from La Paz to Mazatlán where a criminal wants to take possession of some plates to forge dollars.

== Cast ==
- Enrique Lizalde as Víctor Medina
- Regina Torné as Paula
- Armando Silvestre as Tony
- Tito Junco as Iván
- Jorge Russek as Villagrán
- Barbara Angely as Lidia
- Jessica Munguía as Vicky
- Eduardo Noriega as Captain Valdés
- Julián de Meriche as The cripple
- Joaquín Martínez as Pedro
- Eduardo MacGregor as Fake Husband (as Eduardo Mac Gregor)
- Elizabeth San Román as Child's Mom
- Federico Falcón as Saldívar (as Federico del Castillo)
- John Kelly as Gringo
- Victor Eberg as Ivan's Bodyguard (as Victor Eckberg)
- Fernando Yapur as Ivan's Bodyguard
- Pepito Velázquez as Child (as niño José Velázquez)
- Martha Navarro as Rosita
- Horacio Salinas as Serafín

== Release ==
The film was released on 31 August 1967 in the Variedades cinema, for two weeks.

== Reception ==
In Breve historia del cine mexicano: primer siglo, 1897–1997, Emilio García Riera cited the film as an example, alongside S.O.S. Conspiración Bikini (1967) and Cuatro contra el crimen (1968), of Mexican films made in the 1960s to cash in on the success of the James Bond films, referring to them as examples of "underdeveloped James Bond-ism."
