= Harassed (1964 film) =

Acosada
- Directed by: Alberto Dubois
- Written by: Alberto Dubois
- Produced by: Emilio Spitz
- Starring: Libertad Leblanc; Néstor Zavarce; June Roberts
- Cinematography: Ignacio Souto
- Edited by: Rosalino Caterbeti
- Music by: Amadeo Monjes
- Distributed by: Gloria Films
- Release date: 10 September 1964
- Running time: 70 minutes
- Country: Argentina
- Language: Spanish

Harassed, also known as The Exploiteers or The Pink Pussy: Where Sin Lives, (Spanish: Acosada), is a 1964 Argentine sexploitation film directed and written by Alberto Dubois. The film starred Libertad Leblanc and Néstor Zavarce.

== Plot ==
While in New York, a blonde Argentinean exotic dancer, Mara Luján, gets a contract to perform in a nightclub in Caracas, Venezuela, called The Pink Pussy.

When she arrives at the hotel in Caracas, she discovers that no one has made reservations for her. Mara goes to The Pink Pussy, but the manager informs her that no one in New York was authorized to make contracts. Confused, she returns to her hotel and discovers that her room has been ransacked. Valuables and personal documents have been taken. The hotel owner agrees to give her accommodation in exchange for an expensive bracelet which she gives him. She finds herself stranded in a strange city. She starts looking for a job, but only gets negative responses.

As she is returning to the hotel one day, two men force her in a car, take her to a lonely place and rape her. A man named Alex appears, comforts her and takes her back to her hotel. Little by little, Alex gains Mara's trust and gets her a contract at The Pink Pussy.

Mara doesn't know that Alex is a criminal from Caracas and is responsible for everything that has been happening to her. Alex uses this stratagem to lure helpless girls from all over the globe, and then to turn them into sex slaves. The Pink Pussy is the showcase Alex uses to display the "goods" to potential customers.

At The Pink Pussy, Mara meets Ernesto, who works at the club as an entertainer. He takes her to see the city, and they fall in love. When Alex finds out about Ernesto and Mara's relationship, he gets angry and fires Ernesto. Ernesto, believing that Mara had something to do with it, bitterly accuses her of becoming Alex's new "girl".

Meanwhile, Alex's actual girl Elvira, a woman destroyed by drug use, is jealous of Alex's attention to Mara. Elvira contacts Mara, reveals who Alex really is, and informs her that all her belongings are in Alex's possession. Mara goes to Alex's lair. But Alex and his henchmen catch her. Knowing that it is Elvira who has given him away, Alex tries to have her killed, but one of the men lets her escape. Ernesto, who has been following Mara's footsteps, realises that she is in danger and comes to her rescue.

== Release ==
Harassed premiered on 10 September 1964 in Buenos Aires, Argentina. The film was produced and distributed by Gloria Films. It was not until 1 June 1966 that the film premiered in the US in Champaign, Illinois. In the US, the film was dubbed in the English language and distributed by Cambist Films.

== Cast ==
- Libertad Leblanc
- Néstor Zavarce
- Eva Moreno
- June Roberts
- Francisco Ferrari
- José Borda
- Adolfo Martínez Alcalá
- Alberto Álvarez
