= Mburucuyá (1996 film) =

Mburucuyá: Pictures of Nature
- Mburucuyá, cuadros de la naturaleza
- Directed by: Jorge Luis Acha
- Written by: Jorge Luis Acha
- Produced by: Jorge Luis Acha; José Luis Celeiro
- Starring: Ariel Kupfer; Patrick Liotta; Jorge Diez
- Cinematography: José Luis Celeiro
- Edited by: Jorge Luis Acha
- Release date: April 13, 2006 (Argentina)
- Running time: 90 minutes
- Country: Argentina
- Language: Spanish

Mburucuyá: Pictures of Nature (Spanish: Mburucuyá, cuadros de la naturaleza) is a 2006 Argentine experimental essay film written and directed by Jorge Luis Acha. Shot in 1991, the film remained unreleased for years following Acha's death in 1996 prior to optical sound mixing, before receiving its formal premiere in Argentina on 13 April 2006.

== Plot and conceptual analysis ==
Mburucuyá is a film essay inspired by the South American scientific expeditions (1799–1804) led by Prussian naturalist Alexander von Humboldt and French botanist Aimé Bonpland. The narrative contrasts European scientific rationalism, taxonomy, and botanical classification with the animist worldviews and cosmologies of Indigenous peoples.

Set along a river journey into the jungle, the film depicts an epistemic clash between Enlightenment scientific prose and Indigenous mythic narratives. Acha explores the colonial structures underlying European knowledge systems, illustrating how the encyclopedic lens attempts to map and appropriate a natural environment and culture that actively resist categorization.

The primary symbol of the film is the mburucuyá (passionflower), renamed by Spanish missionaries to serve as an educational tool for teaching the Passion of Christ. Through this motif, the film examines the intersection of European language, religious colonization, and Indigenous memory.

Art scholars Marta Penhos and María Alba Bovisio argue that the film parodies the Enlightenment's claims to scientific objectivity, framing European representational frameworks as an "encyclopedic fiction" built on nineteenth-century biases. This tension is dramatized through a dreamlike conceit: the Yaruro character, Salcaghua, is symbolically trapped inside "Alexander's dream"—confined within the conceptual categories through which Europe codified the Americas.

Film critic Ezequiel Iván Duarte classifies the work as an "essayistic fiction" that reflects on the nature of the cinematic apparatus itself, drawing a parallel between the scientist inspecting nature through a magnifying glass and the filmmaker recording through a camera lens—a stylistic connection echoing Werner Herzog's documentary tradition. Critic Eduardo A. Russo has characterized the film as an example of American Baroque, highlighting its playful tone and the synthesis of Acha's background as a painter, writer, and film critic.

Retrospectives at festivals such as the Viennale, Seminci, and Filmoteca de Galicia have highlighted the film as a meditation on colonial history, Indigenous rights, and Latin American cultural identity.

== Cast ==
- Ariel Kupfer as Alexander von Humboldt
- Patrick Liotta as Aimé Bonpland
- Jorge Diez as Salcaghua

== Bibliography ==
- Bernstein, Gustavo (2017). Jorge Acha: una eztetyka sudaka (in Spanish). Buenos Aires: Ítaca Ediciones. ISBN 978-987-45493-5-8.
- Manrupe, Raúl; Portela, María Alejandra (2004). Un diccionario de films argentinos II (1996-2002) (in Spanish). Buenos Aires: Editorial Corregidor. p. 155. ISBN 950-05-1525-3.
