= The Hypocrites (1965 film) =

Los Hipócritas
- Directed by: Enrique Carreras
- Written by: Sixto Pondal Ríos
- Release date: 1965
- Running time: 79 minute
- Country: Argentina
- Language: Spanish

The Hypocrites (Los hipócritas) is a 1965 Argentine crime film directed by Enrique Carreras to a script by Sixto Pondal Ríos.

== Cast ==
- Tita Merello as Marga Albanese
- Jorge Salcedo as Dr. Eugenio Laborda
- Sergio Renán as Bubby
- Walter Vidarte as Toño
- Marcela López Rey as Elena Albanese
- Guillermo Battaglia as Comisario
- Darío Víttori as Dr. Massini
- Jacques Arndt
- Estela Molly as Haydée Borello
- Paula Galés as Cantante
- Patricia Shaw as Sandra
- Elcira Olivera Garcés as Violeta
- Fernando Vegal as Dr. Macetti
- Humberto de la Rosa
- Rodolfo Onetto as Cabo de policía
- Fernando Siro as Fiscal
- Rodolfo Puga
- Rosángela Balbo as Alicia
- Carlos Víctor Andris as Médico
- Rafael Diserio as Sr. Borello
- Josefa Goldar as Sra. Borello
- Hugo Dargó as Silvio
- Fabiana Gavel as Adriana
- Marta Cipriano
- Carlos A. Dussó
- Carlos Bianquet as Diputado
- Roberto Bordoni
- Rafael Chumbita as Policía
- Mónica Linares
- Claudio Lucero as Bachicha
- Aldo Mayo as Periodista
- Susana Beltrán
