= Maura Monti =

Italian-Mexican actress (born 1942)

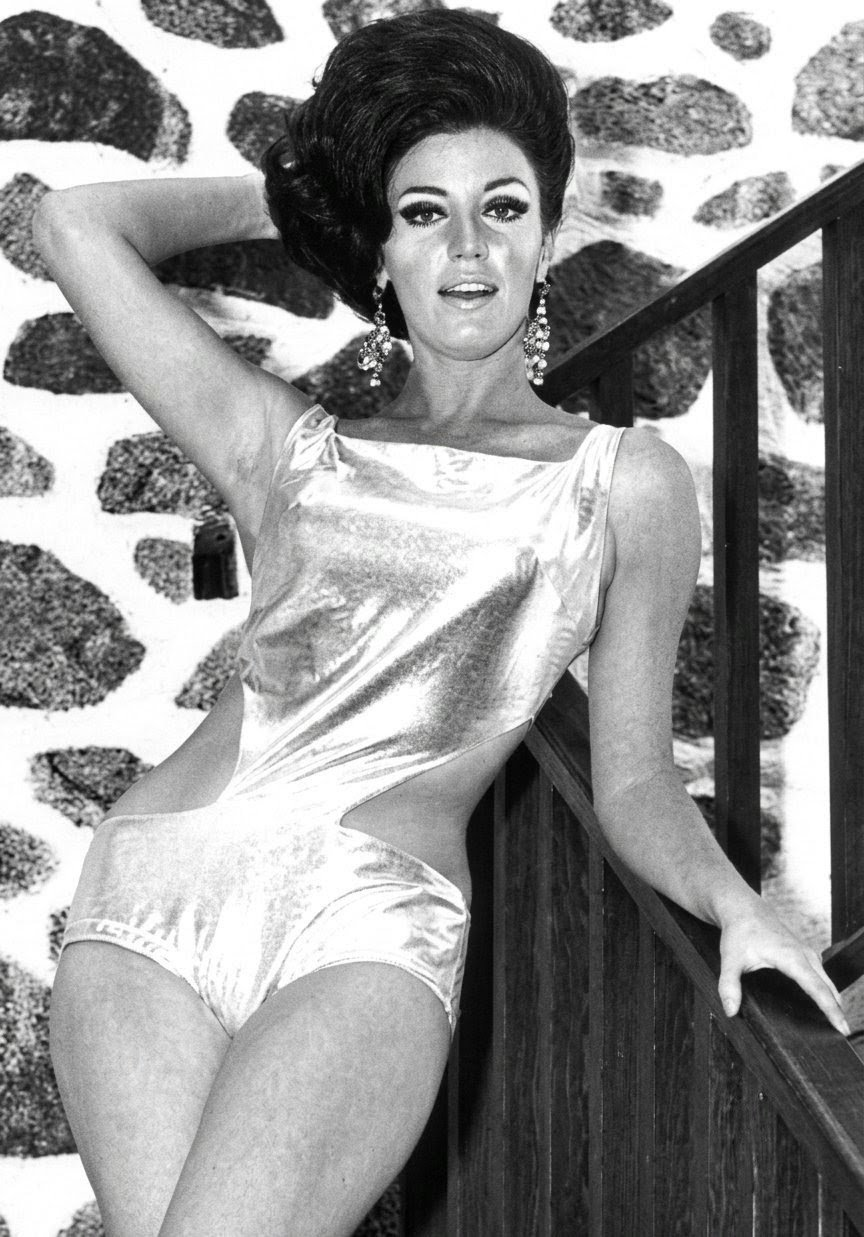
- Monti in Un Latín lover en Acapulco (1968)
- Born: Maura Fazi Pastorino; August 11, 1942 (age 84); Genoa, Italy
- Citizenship: Italy; Mexico
- Occupations: Actress; Model
- Children: 2

Maura Fazi Pastorino (born 11 August 1942), better known as Maura Monti, is an Italian-Mexican actress and model.

== Life and work ==
Monti was born in Genoa (Italy), but moved with her mother to Mexico, where she started to work as a model. She was however quickly discovered for the movies and appeared in string of Mexican films during the second half of the 1960s. Among them were the neo noir thriller Rage starring Glenn Ford and the superhero movie The Bat Woman (La mujer murciélago). In the latter she played the lead character, a masked female superhero similar to the Batwoman character of DC Comics.

In the early 1970s she ended her career as an actress and began to work as moderator and journalist. In the 1990s she settled with her second husband the writer José Antonio Reyes Matamoros in San Cristóbal de las Casas. There she started to work as a teacher at a local school while pursuing painting and writing as well.

== Filmography ==
- 1965: Cucurrucucú Paloma
- 1965: El pecador
- 1966: El proceso de Cristo
- 1966: El planeta de las mujeres invasoras
- 1966: Rage
- 1966: Hombres de roca
- 1967: SOS Conspiración Bikini
- 1967: Su excelencia
- 1967: La muerte en bikini
- 1967: Santo, el Enmascarado de Plata vs. la invasión de los marcianos
- 1967: Don Juan 67
- 1968: Báñame mi amor
- 1968: Un Latín lover en Acapulco
- 1968: The Batwoman (original: La mujer murciélago)
- 1968: Despedida de casada
- 1968: María Isabel
- 1968: El tesoro de Moctezuma
- 1968: Blue Demon destructor de espías
- 1968: Los amores de Juan Charrasqueado
- 1968: Las sicodélicas
- 1968: El día de la boda
- 1968: Me casé con un cura
- 1968: El misterio de los hongos alucinantes
- 1968: Pasaporte a la muerte
- 1969: El matrimonio es como el demonio
- 1969: Veinticuatro horas de vida
- 1969: Muñecas peligrosas
- 1969: Minifaldas con espuelas
- 1969: Las vampiras
- 1969: Con licencia para matar
- 1969: La casa de las muchachas
- 1969: Cazadores de espías
- 1970: El despertar del lobo
- 1970: Las tres magníficas
- 1971: The Incredible Invasion
- 1978–1989 En vivo (culture magazine, moderation)
