= Gustavo Bernstein =

Argentine writer and director

Gustavo Bernstein (born 5 October 1966 in Buenos Aires) is an Argentine architect, writer, filmmaker, and cultural critic.

== Career ==
Bernstein graduated as an architect from the University of Buenos Aires. Parallel to his architectural practice, he developed a career in literature, cultural journalism, and filmmaking.

=== Literature ===
Bernstein's early publications include Maradona, Iconography of the Motherland (1997), an essay which presents Diego Maradona as a national myth and a symbol of Argentine identity; Ten Cinema Stories (1998); and Sarrasani, Between the Fable and the Epic (2000), a novel centered on the history of the Sarrasani Circus and the Stosch-Sarrasani family. He subsequently published The Pilgrim Homeland (2001); Exercises of Faith (2003); and Mutatis Mutandis (2015).

In 2019 he published The Face of Christ in Cinema. A Cinematic Reading of the Gospel, an essay examining representations of Jesus in film history. That same year he published the novel De Ronde. Portrait of a Stateless Person, a literary reconstruction of the life of Dutch chess player Chris de Ronde. He also published Prompt Proses (2021), a compilation of journalistic writings.

=== Film ===
As a film critic and researcher, Bernstein has written extensively on the legacy of Argentine filmmaker and writer Jorge Luis Acha. He compiled and edited Posthumous Writings, volumes I and II (2012–2014), and the collective volume Jorge Acha: una eztetyka sudaka (2017). In filmmaking, he wrote and directed the feature film Sudacas (1997) and co-directed the essayistic documentary Thálassa, a Self-Portrait of Jorge Acha (2017).

=== Journalism and teaching ===
Bernstein has contributed essays and cultural criticism to newspapers, magazines and cultural publications, writing on architecture, cinema, literature, politics and cultural affairs.

Since 2013, he has taught public courses on William Shakespeare, literature and cinema, and film history at the Ricardo Rojas Cultural Center of the University of Buenos Aires.
