= Libertad Leblanc =

Argentine actress (1938–2021)

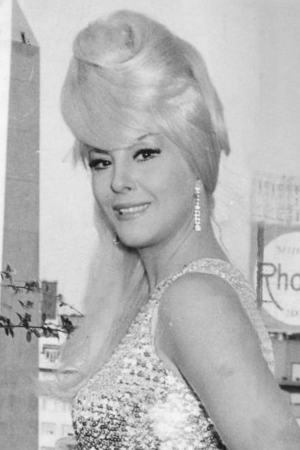
- Leblanc in 1969
- Born: Libertad María de los Ángeles Vichich; 24 February 1938; Guardia Mitre, Río Negro Province, Argentina
- Died: 29 April 2021 (aged 83); Buenos Aires, Argentina
- Occupation: Actress
- Years active: 1960-1978
- Spouse(s): Leonardo Barujel (1957-1959) (divorced, 1 child)
- Children: Leonor Barujel-Vichich

Libertad María de los Ángeles Vichich Blanco (Spanish pronunciation: [liβeɾˈtað ˈleβlaŋk]; 24 February 1938 – 29 April 2021) was an Argentine film actress, famous for starring in multiple 1960s erotic films.

Leblanc was one of Argentina's platinum blonde sex symbols in the 1960s and 1970s, the buxom blonde appeared in a number of adult-oriented films often with nudity or sexual content such as Harassed (Acosada)(1964). Many of her films were controversial; the 1968 film La Endemoniada was also known in English as A Woman Possessed, a vampirish horror film with explicit nudity. In 1967 she appeared in the lustful La Venus maldita. In 1969 she appeared in Deliciosamente amoral, again lined with controversy.

Leblanc also appeared in TV versions of Nana (the novel of Émile Zola), Lola Montès and Lady Hamilton.

She was offered a contract from Columbia Pictures, but her ex-husband refused to let her leave with her daughter to another country, so she declined the offer. Also, she was considered a "rival" of Isabel Sarli, who made the same style of films. Mirtha Legrand reunited both stars in 1994, when Libertad admitted that their "rivalry" was only a LeBlanc publicity stunt, so both film stars remained friends until their death. Leblanc jokingly suggested Sarli get rid of her pets. Isabel, for her part, showed Libertad up every time she brazenly took years off of the blonde diva's actual age. In the same manner, she told that she was a nineteen-year-old divorcée in the early sixties.

== Biography ==
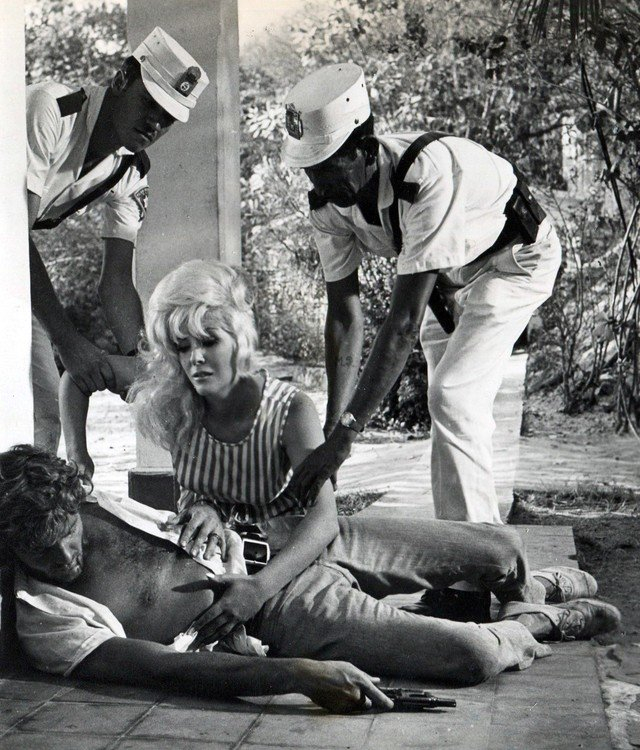
Leblanc with Guillermo Murray in a still from The Damned Venus (1967)

Libertad Leblanc's paternal grandfather was a Slovenian landowner, who settled in Río Negro. She was named by her father Libertad, which means "Freedom" in the Spanish Language. Her father was a handy businessman who was murdered, and whose skill for business and negotiation she inherited and would later use frequently as an actress. Libertad was considered "naughty" and playful in her childhood and so, after her widow mother found a second husband, she entrusted the girl's education to a Catholic school ruled by nuns. Leblanc was expelled from the school four times, and every time that happened her grandmother bribed the nuns with big donations, so young Libertad was always readmitted. Passionate about acting since childhood, she used to take part in school plays as María de los Remedios de Escalada and the Virgin Mary. In those years, she threw an inkwell against a nun's neck and the latter had to be hospitalized due to intense bleeding.

She married movie producer Leonardo Barujel; her father-in-law adored her and had a lovely family home set up in Córdoba. The latter insisted that while was sweet enough to be Leonardo's wife, his son was not the best choice for a spouse, also telling her: "You should give that crazy one up". In fact, he was so glad with Leblanc as a daughter-in-law that he proposed Libertad the idea of replacing her husband Leonardo with another son of him, hence Leblanc's brother-in-law. Eventually the couple divorced.

Libertad was strongly resolute to become an artist against the familiar opposition and her former spouse's wishes, who expected that she would renew their married life after starving and practicing penance in a convent. However, her popularity aborted that idea: with few money but with brilliant ideas for publicity, she unexpectedly posed in a bikini on a trampoline at a Venezuelan hotel while famous movie star Graciela Borges answered journalists' questions regarding the Cannes Film Festival; photographers started to capture her and press workers approached to the then unknown starlet, suddenly attracting all the attention.

Another publicity stunt created by Leblanc was probably her most successful in Argentina and abroad: for one of her first movies, Libertad had special posters made for every local cinema, stating: "Libertad Leblanc, Isabel Sarli's rival". "I admired Isabel's career because when the sixties started she had become a living goddess in American countries and even in Great Britain", Leblanc would confess decades later. Consequently, film directors and producers contacted and started bankrolling Libertad Leblanc's films, and soon her initial leading roles on screen turned out to be profitable enough to begin her independent life. And, most important of all: Libertad deliberately made it without a manager, and she would always manage her own career. Thus, in her late twenties, the newly acclaimed actress took a stance as a «self-made woman» who did not want to remain subjected to anyone else.

Following her marital failure and subsequent divorce with Barujel, and although she kept herself "marriageable", she preferred to have torrid and fleeting affairs with fancy men than a stable marital union. Big-bottomed men were repulsive to her and she always felt attracted by brawny males. In her adult decades, she acquired an apartment in Madrid as well as another in Catalonia.

Her mental inquisitiveness was one of her distinctive traits. She described herself as an agnostic and an amateur gardener, and stated that having a clear conscience was paramount for her.

Libertad was shown in a photo with two lines of artificial eyelashes and two wigs off simultaneously, with the result that she appeared on screen as a transvestite, of which she was deeply proud.

She would occasionally get "carried away" by what would be described as a very strong eleutheromania that made her travel over Asia and Europe in her leisure time. She would claim that she lived in accordance with what her first name means (Libertad meaning "freedom" in Spanish).

== Personal life ==
She was married and later divorced to producer Leonardo Barujel.

== Filmography ==
- Standard (1989)
- Furia en la isla (1976) with Lily
- Olga, la hija de aquella princesa rusa (1972)
- Cerco de terror (1972)
- Mujeres de medianoche (1969)
- Cautiva de la selva (1969)
- La culpa (1969) with Márgara
- Deliciosamente amoral (1969)
- La endemoniada (1968)
- Psexoanálisis (1968)
- La casa de Madame Lulú (1968)
- El satánico (1968)
- 4 contra el crimen (1968)
- Noches prohibidas (1968)
- Esclava del deseo (1968)
- El derecho de gozar (1968)
- Seis Días para Morir (La Rabia) (1967)
- Cuando los hombres hablan de mujeres (1967)
- La Perra (1967)
- La Venus maldita (1967)
- La piel desnuda (1966)
- Fuego en la sangre (1965)
- La cómplice (1965)
- Una mujer sin precio (1964)
- María M. (1964)
- Acosada (1964)
- Testigo para un crimen (1963)
- La Flor de Irupé (1962)
- La procesión (1960)
- El bote, el río y la gente (1960)
- El primer beso (1958)
