= Guillermo Murray =

Argentine actor (1927–2021)

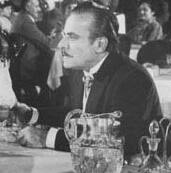
- Born: 15 June 1927; Colón, Buenos Aires, Argentina
- Died: 6 May 2021 (aged 93)
- Other name: Guillermo Murray Muttis Bird Sayi
- Occupation: Actor
- Years active: 1954-2021
- Children: (5) - including Rodrigo Murray

Guillermo Murray (15 June 1927 – 6 May 2021) was an Argentine actor. He also directed three films.

== Selected filmography ==
- Alfonsina (1957)
- Planet of the Female Invaders (1966)
- La venus maldita (1967)
- The Chinese Room (1968)
- Flor marchita (1969)
- The Rebellious Novice (1971)
- Victoria (1972)
- The Truce (2003)
- My Mexican Shivah (2007)

== Bibliography ==
- Goble, Alan. The Complete Index to Literary Sources in Film. Walter de Gruyter, 1999.
