= Emilio García Riera =

Spanish-Mexican actor, writer and critic

Emilio García Riera (17 November 1931 – 11 October 2002) was a Spanish-born Mexican actor, writer and cinema critic. He has written exhaustively on Mexican cinema of 1929 and 1976, leaving behind an anthology in eighteen volumes, Historia documental del cine mexicano.

After the Spanish Civil War he moved first to France, then to the Dominican Republic, where his father died, and in 1944 arrived in Mexico, which became his adopted country. He worked in the Economics faculty of the National Autonomous University of Mexico, as a researcher in the Centre of Communication, as a professor of the sociology of cinema in the faculty of Social and political sciences, and as a professor in his alma mater's University Centre for Cinematography Studies. He later moved to the city of Guadalajara, where he was the founder and director of the Centre of Cinematography Research and Teaching at the University of Guadalajara, which posthumously awarded him an honorary doctorate.

On the "Golden Age of Mexican Cinema," he wrote, "It's usual to talk of a Golden Age of Mexican cinema with greater nostalgia than chronological accuracy. If that Age actually existed, it was... 1941 to 1945."
