= Scream queen =

Actress known for her work in horror films

Jamie Lee Curtis as Laurie Strode in Halloween (1978). She became known as the "ultimate scream queen" for this role, which she reprised in later sequels

A scream queen (a wordplay on screen queen) is an actress who is prominent and influential in horror films, either through a notable appearance or recurring roles. The title is a buzzword used by critics and has gained positive and negative responses. Scream king is the male version of the title. Notable scream queen examples include Fay Wray, Janet Leigh, Lorena Velázquez, Norma Lazareno, Marilyn Burns, Edith González, Jamie Lee Curtis, Sarah Michelle Gellar, Neve Campbell, Vera Farmiga, Melissa Barrera, and Mia Goth.

== Definition ==
The term "scream queen" is more specifically used to refer to the attractive young damsel-in-distress characters that have appeared in a number of films in the horror genre. Lloyd Kaufman, co-founder of Troma Entertainment, noted that being a scream queen is "more than just crying and having ketchup thrown on you. You not only have to be attractive, but you also have to have a big brain. You have to be frightened, you have to be sad, you have to be romantic."

Debbie Rochon, often described as a scream queen herself, wrote in an article originally published in GC Magazine that "a true Scream Queen isn't The Perfect Woman. She's sexy, seductive, but most importantly attainable to the average guy, or so it would seem." Although the earlier scream queens might be women that "just had to look pretty and shriek a lot until the hero of the film got around to save them." The later scream queens "showcase women worrying about something other than a guy...unless said guy is the one trying to kill them," with some of them wreaking vengeance by defeating the villain.

== History ==
=== Beginnings (1910s–60s) ===
The first-ever titled scream queen was Paula Maxa, who was a stage-actress at the Paris theater Grand Guignol in 1916. She is known as "The Most Murdered Woman In The World".

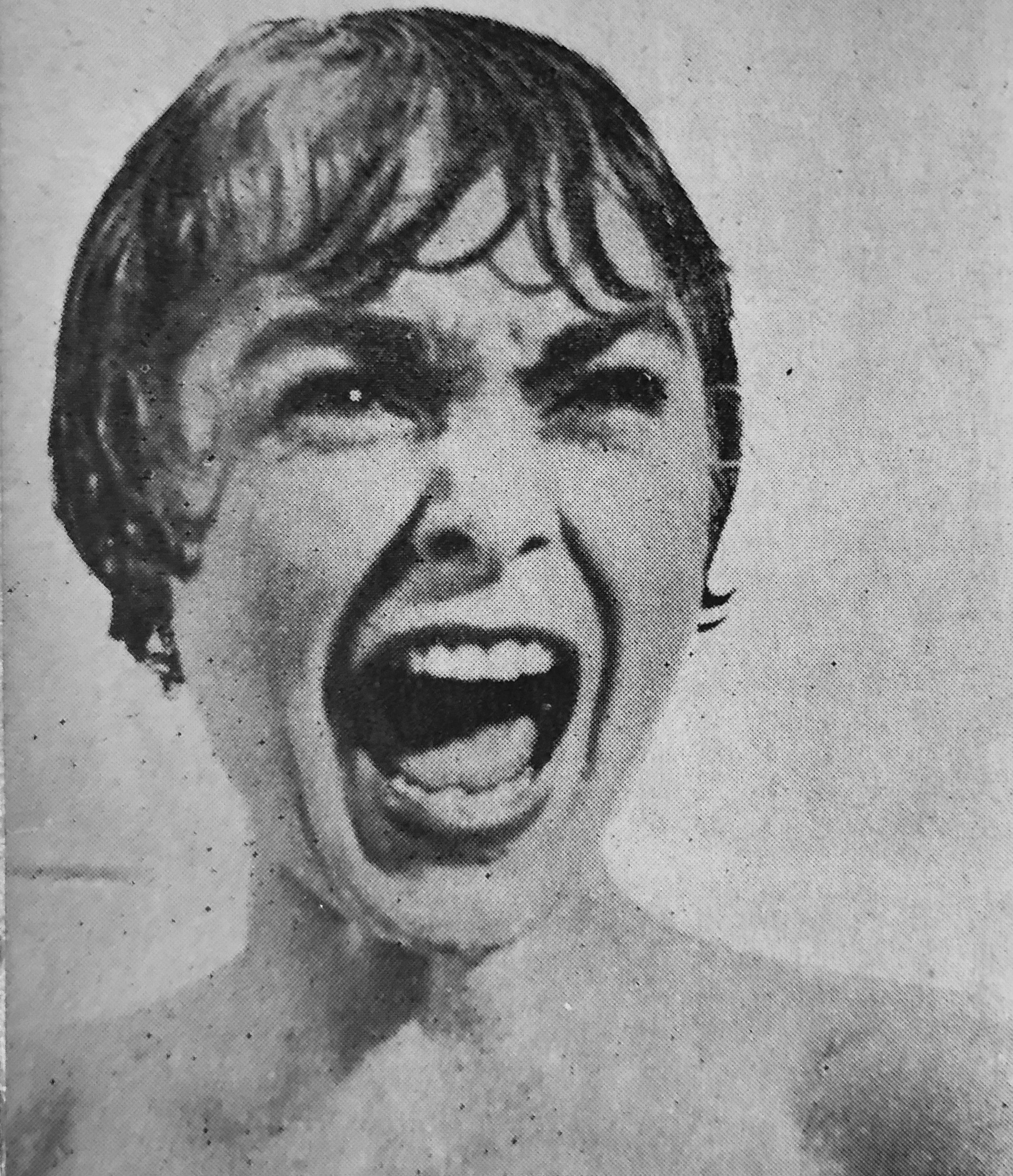
Janet Leigh as Marion Crane in Psycho (1960). Her screaming scene in the film has been deemed "iconic" and recreated in other cinematographic projects

American actresses rose to fame, in the 1920s during the prominence of the silent movie era. The prominence of women in horror films dates back to the with notable examples including the productions The Cabinet of Dr. Caligari (1920) and Nosferatu (1922). George Feltenstein, film historian and senior vice president of theatrical catalog marketing at Warner Home Video, states, "Women screaming in terror has been a Hollywood mainstay – even when films were silent". Fay Wray, an actress starring in King Kong (1933), is sometimes referred to as the "very first scream queen". Anne Gwynne is known for scream queen roles in the 1930s and 1940s.

Janet Leigh, playing Marion in Alfred Hitchcock's Psycho (1960), is regarded as "one of the most iconic" scream queens in horror film history. Veronica Cartwright appeared in the horror scene with Alfred Hitchcock's The Birds in 1963. She would later rise as a prominent scream queen in the 1970s, thanks to her appearances in the 1978 remake of Invasion of the Body Snatchers and Alien in 1979.

In 1968, Norma Lazareno set a precedent in regards of the Mexican scream queens after co-starring in Hasta el viento tiene miedo, where she had a memorable screaming scene that placed her as an early use of the term in Mexico, which was complemented by other of her appearances in horror films such as La endemoniada (1968), Night of the Bloody Apes (1969), El Libro de piedra (1969). Other relevant Mexican scream queens of her time included Lorena Velázquez, who before her had already appeared in horror films such as The Ship of Monsters (1960) and Santo vs. las Mujeres Vampiro (1962), and Rosita Arenas, who also appeared in films related to the genre, such as La Momia Azteca film series (1957–1958), The Witches Mirror (1960) and The Curse of the Crying Woman (1963).

=== 1970s ===
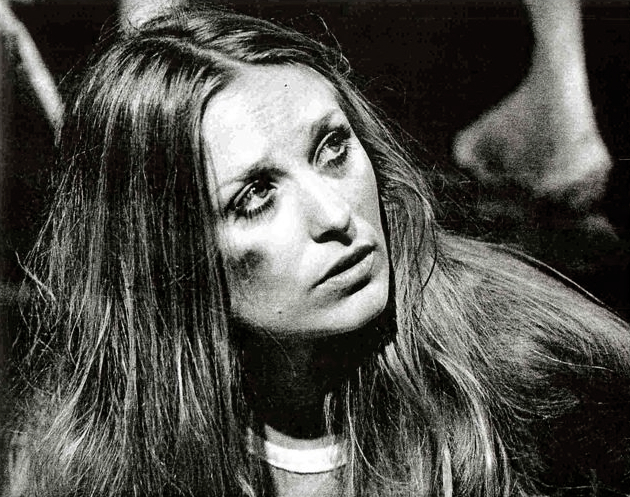
Marilyn Burns as Sally Hardesty in The Texas Chain Saw Massacre (1974)

The 1970s became seminal examples of a "scream queen" for the decade. Marilyn Burns, who portrayed Sally Hardesty in The Texas Chain Saw Massacre (1974) would go onto appearing in Helter Skelter (1976) and Eaten Alive (1977). Jamie Lee Curtis, daughter of Psycho actress Janet Leigh, portrayed Laurie Strode in Halloween (1978). Curtis has been called the "ultimate Scream Queen".

Dee Wallace appeared in the thriller The Stepford Wives (1975) before appearing in Wes Craven's 1977 horror film The Hills Have Eyes. Daria Nicolodi played the role of the scream queen in most of her films directed by Dario Argento including Deep Red (1975) and Shock (1977) directed by Mario Bava.

In 1977, Mexican child actress Edith González made her first horror film appearance in Alucarda, la hija de las tinieblas, where she only had an small role as a village girl. One year later, she was cast in Cyclone, a 1978 survival horror that gave her more exposure for being an international production between Italy and Mexico. Later on, she had a more prominent role in Trampa Infernal from 1989, which was one of the first slasher films of Mexico.

=== 1980s ===
The success of Halloween revived slasher films in the 1980s. Adrienne Barbeau is known for her roles a scream queen in The Fog (1980) and Escape from New York (1981). Linnea Quigley played a significant role as a scream queen during the rise of B Movie in The Return of the Living Dead (1985) and Silent Night, Deadly Night (1984). Betsy Palmer had been praised for her role as a scream queen in the Friday the 13th franchise as Pamela Voorhees. Barbara Crampton is known as a scream queen for her roles in the Body Double (1984) and Re-Animator (1985).

=== 1990s ===
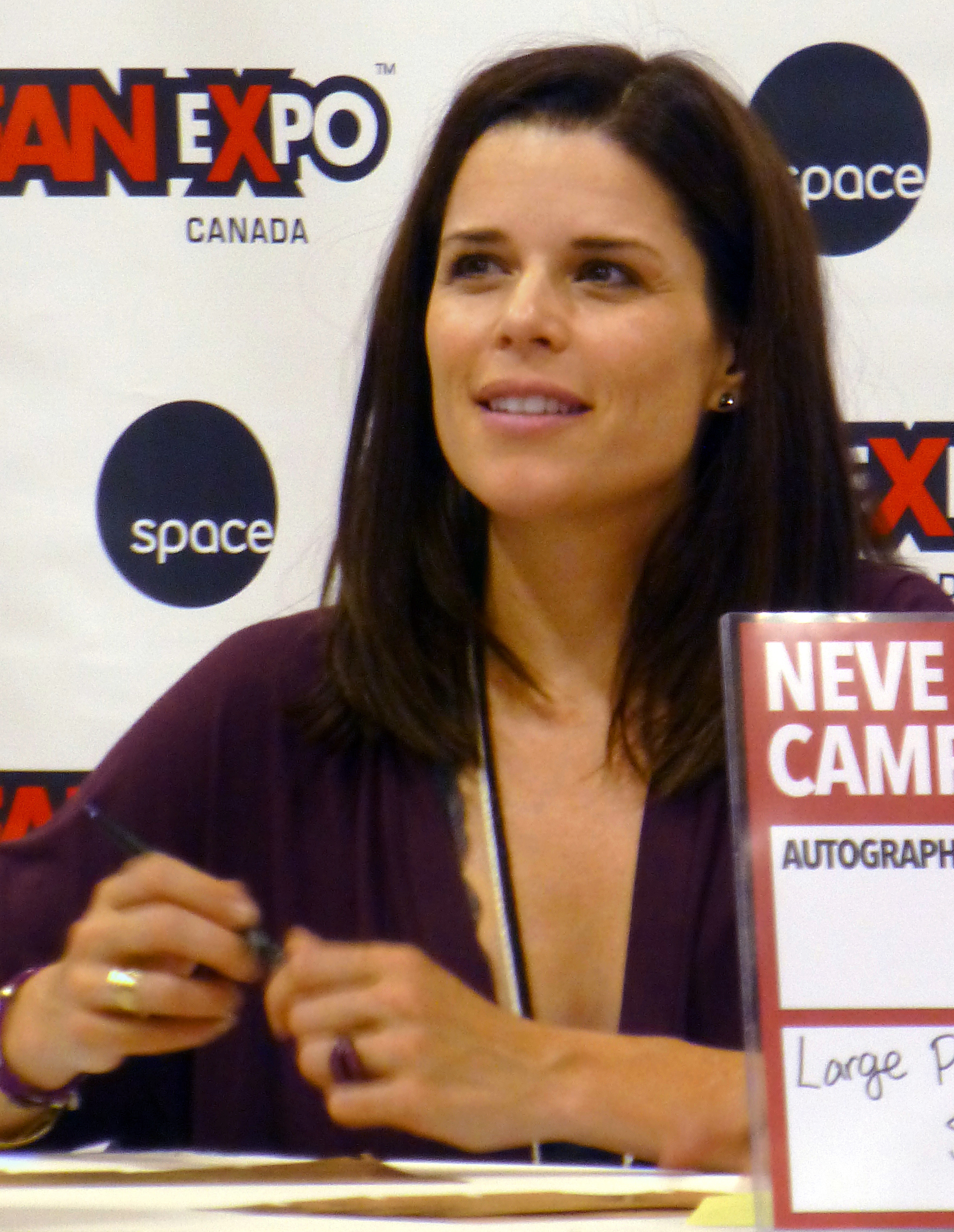
Neve Campbell gained fame for her lead role as Sidney Prescott in the Scream franchise

During the 1990s, Debbie Rochon starred in dozens of Troma Production horror films and was voted by Draculina magazine as its "Scream Queen of the Decade". Sheryl Lee played murder victims Laura Palmer and Maddy Ferguson in the TV series Twin Peaks (1990–91) and spin-off film Twin Peaks: Fire Walk with Me (1992) and has been described as a "scream queen", in particular for scenes in the otherworldly Black Lodge.

Neve Campbell's first American feature film was the cult horror classic The Craft (1996). She later starred as Sidney Prescott in the Scream film series. Jennifer Love Hewitt was labeled a scream queen after starring as Julie James in the I Know What You Did Last Summer films. The first film of that trilogy also had a starring role for Sarah Michelle Gellar as Helen Shivers, who went on to appear in other horror films made during the 1990s and new millennium, including Scream 2 and The Grudge film series.

=== 2000s ===
In 2005, Shauna Macdonald starred in The Descent, which established her as a scream queen and for which she was nominated for the Saturn Award for Best Actress. Elisha Cuthbert starred in the horror film House of Wax (2005) and Captivity (2007), gaining the status by from films. Erica Leerhsen has been called a scream queen because of her roles in films like Book of Shadows: Blair Witch 2 (2000), The Texas Chainsaw Massacre (2003), and Wrong Turn 2: Dead End (2007).

In 2007, USA Today published an article listing on modern scream queens interviewing actresses Sheri Moon Zombie, Jaimie Alexander, Andrea Bogart, Mercedes McNab, Tiffany Shepis and Cerina Vincent. Since 2007 and her appearance in Halloween, Danielle Harris has increased her genre work, being subsequently called "horror's reigning scream queen" by the NY Daily News.

=== 2010s ===
Bipasha Basu has been referred as "Bollywood's Scream Queen" due to her contributions to horror in India with her blockbuster horror movie franchise Raaz as well as the films Aatma (2013) and Creature 3D (2014). Maika Monroe achieved a career breakthrough with her leading role as Jay Height in the horror film It Follows (2014), she had solidified her growth as a scream queen through her appearances in The Guest (2014) and Villains (2019) and throughout the 2020s. Indonesian actress Tara Basro has been described as a "scream queen" for her roles in Joko Anwar's films Satan's Slaves (2017) and Impetigore (2019). Australian actress Samara Weaving solidified her status as a scream queen with her performance in the commercially and critically successful Ready or Not (2019) and its sequel.

=== 2020s ===
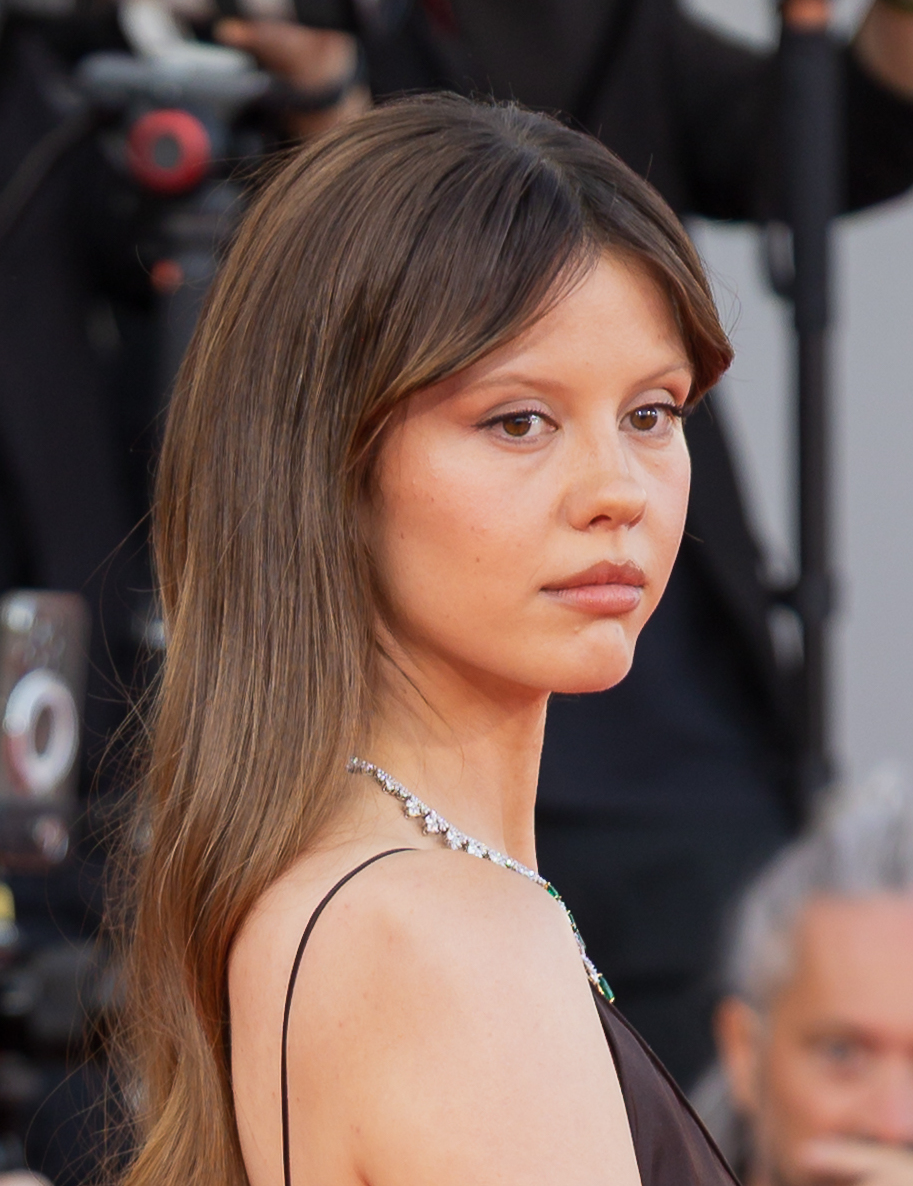
Mia Goth became known for playing Pearl and Maxine Minx in the X film series

Georgina Campbell has been dubbed a scream queen after starring in the horror films Barbarian (2022), and The Watchers (2024). Jenna Ortega starred in the slasher films X and Scream (both 2022), and is also known as a scream queen. Melissa Barrera has starred in the slasher franchise Scream, the horror comedy Abigail (2024), and the romantic comedy-horror Your Monster (2024), establishing herself as a scream queen. With Kathryn Newton's roles in Abigail and Lisa Frankenstein (2024) both being praised, she has been highlighted as a modern scream queen.

Mia Goth had starred in several horror movies previously before her breakout roles in the X trilogy (2022–2024), which cemented her as a scream queen to a wider audience. Sophie Thatcher of cannibalistic TV series Yellowjackets (2021–) fame gained traction as a scream queen after her performances in The Boogeyman (2023) and Heretic (2024).

== List ==
Years active	Actor	First horror film (or series)	Notes
1916–1930	Paula Maxa	Le Laboratoire des Hallucinations (1916)	Known as the "The Most Murdered Woman In The World"
1920–1980	Fay Wray	King Kong (1933)	Referred to as the "very first scream queen"
1939–1970	Anne Gwynne	Black Friday (1940)	Her last known horror film: House of Frankenstein (1944)
1946–2004	Janet Leigh	Psycho (1960)	Also known from The Fog (1980), mother of Jamie Lee Curtis
1950–present	Rosita Arenas	The Aztec Mummy (1957)	Also known for The Witch's Mirror (1960) and The Curse of the Crying Woman (1963)
1951–2007	Betsy Palmer	Friday the 13th (1980)	Best known for Friday the 13th
1951–present	Cassandra Peterson	Elvira's Movie Macabre (1981–1986)	Best known as a horror hostess and from Elvira: Mistress of the Dark (1988)
1954–present	Norma Lazareno	Hasta el viento tiene miedo (1968)	Also known for Night of the Bloody Apes (1969) and El Libro de piedra (1969)
1956–2024	Lorena Velázquez	The Ship of Monsters (1960)	Best known for Santo vs. las Mujeres Vampiro (1962)
1958–present	Veronica Cartwright	The Birds (1963)	Best known for the Invasion of the Body Snatchers (1978)
1958–present	Barbara Steele	Black Sunday (1960)	Best known for Dark Shadows (1991)
1964–2018	Olivia Hussey	Black Christmas (1974)	Also known for It (1990)
1965–present	Jodie Foster	The Silence of the Lambs (1991)	Best known for The Silence of the Lambs
1968–present	Sissy Spacek	Carrie (1976)	Best known for Carrie
1968–present	Adrienne Barbeau	The Fog (1980)	Best known for Argo (2012)
1970–2014	Marilyn Burns	Texas Chainsaw Massacre (1974)	Best known for Texas Chainsaw Massacre franchise
1970–2019	Edith González	Alucarda (1977)	Best known for Cyclone (1978) and Trampa Infernal (1989)
1970–2020	Daria Nicolodi	Deep Red (1975)	Best known for her work directed by Dario Argento
1970–2002, 2022–2024	Shelley Duvall	The Shining (1980)	Best known for The Shining
1971–present	Sigourney Weaver	Alien (1979)	Best known for the Alien franchise
1974–present	Dee Wallace	The Hills Have Eyes (1977)	Best known for Cujo (1983)
1976–present	Jessica Lange	King Kong (1976)	Best known for Cape Fear and several roles in the American Horror Story franchise
1977–present	Jamie Lee Curtis	Halloween (1978)	Best known for the Halloween franchise; daughter of Janet Leigh
1978–present	Linnea Quigley	Psycho from Texas (1975)	Best known for Return of the Living Dead (1985)
1979-present	Eileen Daly	The Babysitter (1993)	Best known for Razor Blade Smile (1998)
1981–present	Sarah Michelle Gellar	I Know What You Did Last Summer (1997)	Best known for the Buffy The Vampire Slayer television series (1997–2003) and the Scooby Doo film series (2002–2004)
1981–present	Michelle Bauer	The Tomb (1986)	Best known for Sorority Babes in the Slimeball Bowl-O-Rama (1988)
1982–present	Debbie Rochon	Lurkers (1987)	Best known for Vampire's Kiss (1989) and several roles in Troma Entertainment films
1983–present	Heather Langenkamp	A Nightmare on Elm Street (1984)	Best known for A Nightmare On Elm Street franchise
1983–present	Virginia Madsen	Zombie High (1987)	Best known for Candyman (1992)
1983–present	Felissa Rose	Sleepaway Camp (1983)	Best known for the Sleepaway Camp series
1984–present	Ashley Laurence	Hellraiser (1987)	Best known for the Hellraiser franchise
1984–present	Barbara Crampton	Body Double (1984)	Best known for Re-Animator (1985)
1984–present	Courteney Cox	Scream (1996)	Best known from the Scream franchise
1984–present	Jennifer Tilly	Bride of Chucky (1998)	Best known for the Child's Play franchise
1985–present	Danielle Harris	Halloween 4: The Return of Michael Myers (1988)	Best known for the Halloween franchise
1986–present	Sheryl Lee	Twin Peaks television series (1990)	Best known for the Twins Peaks television series
1986–present	Naomi Watts	Children of the Corn IV: The Gathering (1996)	Best known for The Ring (2002)
1988–present	Milla Jovovich	Resident Evil (2002)	Best known for Resident Evil film series
1989–present	Jennifer Love Hewitt	I Know What You Did Last Summer (1997)	Best known for the I Know What You Did Last Summer franchise
1989–present	Katharine Isabelle	Disturbing Behavior (1998)	Best known for Ginger Snaps (2000)
1989–2019	Emily Perkins	It (1990)	Best known for Ginger Snaps (2000)
1990–present	Toni Collette	The Sixth Sense (1999)	Best known for Hereditary (2018)
1990–present	Christina Ricci	The Addams Family (1991)	Best known for Sleepy Hollow (1999) and the Yellowjackets television series (2021–present)
1991–2014	Kris Aquino	Shake, Rattle & Roll III (1991)	Best known for Feng Shui (2004) and Sequel (2014)
1991–present	Meagan Good	Venom (2005)	Best known for Saw V (2008)
1991–present	Neve Campbell	The Dark (1993)	Best known for the Scream franchise
1994–present	Sarah Paulson	American Horror Story Murder House (2011)	Best known for several roles in the American Horror Story series and Run (2020)
1995–2008	Rei Hance	The Blair Witch Project (1999)	Best known for The Blair Witch Project film series
1996–present	Bipasha Basu	Raaz (2002)	Best known for Raaz franchise
1996–present	Elisha Cuthbert	Are You Afraid of the Dark? (1999–2000)	Best known for House of Wax (2005)
1996–present	Vera Farmiga	Joshua (2007)	Best known for The Conjuring Universe franchise
1996–present	Crystal Lowe	Sanctimony (2000)	Best known for Final Destination 3 (2006)
1996–present	Tiffany Shepis	Terror Firmer (1998)	Best known for Tromeo and Juliet (1996)
1997–present	Mary Elizabeth Winstead	Wolf Lake (2001–2002)	Best known for The Ring Two (2005), Final Destination 3 (2006), and 10 Cloverfield Lane (2016)
1999–present	Ali Larter	House on Haunted Hill (1999)	Best known for Final Destination franchise (2000) and Resident Evil franchise
1999–present	Erica Leerhsen	Book of Shadows: Blair Witch 2 (2000)	Best known for The Texas Chainsaw Massacre (2003)
1999–present	Brandy Norwood	I Still Know What You Did Last Summer (1998)	Best known for The Front Room (2024)
2001–present	Kathryn Newton	Paranormal Activity 4 (2012)	Best known for Abigail (2024) and Lisa Frankenstein (2024)
2001–present	Emma Roberts	Scream 4 (2011)	Best known for several roles in the American Horror Story franchise and Scream Queens (2015)
2002–present	Jodelle Ferland	Carrie (2002)	Best known for Silent Hill (2006) and Case 39 (2009)
2003–present	Teresa Palmer	Wolf Creek (2005)	Best known for A Discovery of Witches (2011)
2004–present	Riley Keough	Kiss of the Damned (2012)	Best known for The Lodge (2019)
2004–present	Chloë Grace Moretz	The Amityville Horror (2005)	Best known for Dark Shadows (2012) and Carrie (2013)
2004–present	Samara Weaving	Ash vs Evil Dead series (2015)	Best known for the Ready or Not film series
2004–present	Allison Williams	Get Out (2017)	Also known for the M3GAN film series
2006–present	Kiernan Shipka	Carriers (2009)	Best known for the Chilling Adventures of Sabrina television series (2018–2020) and Totally Killer (2023)
2006–present	Kate Siegel	Oculus (2013)	Best known for Gerald's Game (2017) and The Haunting of Hill House television miniseries (2018)
2006–present	Wunmi Moskau	Citadel (2012)	Best known for His House (2020) and Sinners (2025)
2007–present	Katie Douglas	Compulsion (2013)	Best known for Clown in a Cornfield (2025)
2009–present	Georgina Campbell	All My Friends Hate Me (2021)	Best known for Barbarian (2022)
2009–present	Olivia Holt	Totally Killer (2023)	Best known for Heart Eyes (2025)
2010–present	Carla Abellana	Third Eye (2014)	Best known for the Shake, Rattle & Roll film series
2010–present	Jessica Rothe	Happy Death Day (2017)	Best known for the Happy Death Day film series
2011–present	Jane Levy	Evil Dead (2013)	Best known for Don't Breathe (2016)
2011–present	Melissa Barrera	Scream (2022)	Best known for the Scream franchise
2011–present	Taissa Farmiga	American Horror Story Murder House (2011)	Best known for several roles in the American Horror Story franchise and The Nun (2018)
2011–present	Julia Garner	The Last Exorcism Part II (2013)	Best known for Weapons (2025)
2011–present	Tara Basro	Satan's Slaves (2017)	Best known for Impetigore (2019)
2012–present	Nell Tiger Free	The First Omen (2024)	Best known for the Servant television series (2019–2023)
2012–present	Sadie Sink	Stranger Things (2017–2025)	Also known for Fear Street Part Two: 1978 (2021)
2012–present	Mckenna Grace	Suburban Gothic (2014)	Best known for Annabelle Comes Home (2019)
2012–present	Olivia Cooke	The Secret of Crickley Hall television series (2012)	Best known for the Bates Motel television series (2013–2017)
2012–present	Maika Monroe	It Follows (2014)	Also known for Longlegs (2024)
2012–present	Jenna Ortega	Insidious: Chapter 2 (2013)	Best known for the Wednesday (2022–present) television series and the Scream franchise
2012–present	Lulu Wilson	Ouija: Origin of Evil (2016)	Best known for Annabelle: Creation (2017)
2013–present	Jasmin Savoy Brown	Yellowjackets television series (2021–present)	Also known for the Scream franchise
2013–present	Mia Goth	A Cure For Wellness (2016)	Best known for the X film series
2013–present	Lupita Nyong'o	Us (2019)	Also known for A Quiet Place: Day One (2024)
2014–present	Victoria Pedretti	The Haunting of Hill House (2018)	Best known for the You television series (2019–2021)
2014–present	Cailee Spaeny	The Craft: Legacy (2020)	Best known for Alien: Romulus (2024)
2014–present	Madeleine McGraw	Mandela Effect (2019)	Best known for The Black Phone (2021)
2016–present	Violet McGraw	Doctor Sleep (2019)	Best known for the M3GAN film series
2016–present	Lauren LaVera	Terrifier 2 (2022)	Best known for the Terrifier film series
2018–present	Inde Navarrette	Obsession (2025)	Best known for Obsession (2025)

== See also ==
- Final girl
- Scream king
- History of horror movies
- Invasion of the Scream Queens, a 1992 documentary
- Scream, Queen! My Nightmare on Elm Street, a 2019 documentary
