= Scream king =

Name for prominent horror film actors

Bruce Campbell as Ash Williams in Evil Dead II. (1987) He is known for playing such character in the Evil Dead franchise, which gained him the fame to be referred to as "the definitive scream king"

A scream king is an actor who is prominent and influential in horror films through either a notable appearance or recurring roles. Scream queen is the equivalent for women. Notable scream king examples include Vincent Price, Bruce Campbell, Justin Long, Patrick Wilson, Bill Skarsgard, and Matthew Lillard.

== Definition ==
The term "scream king" has been used to refer to male leading actors who have made their name through taking on leading roles in horror movies as a "final guy" (male equivalent of "final girl") character. Rachel Roth defines the rise of the "scream kings" as a result of moving away from formulas where men are typically cast as monsters for a female character to fight off and female actresses being cast less as victims and sometimes as the monster or villain themselves. Roth cites Bruce Campbell as an early example of a scream king for his role in the Evil Dead franchise (where Bruce Campbell screamed like a girl). Campbell has also been referred to as "the definitive scream king."

Ryan Heffernan from Dread Central states "A scream king is an actor that doesn’t merely work in genre cinema on occasion or by chance but a fella that does so deliberately and proudly embraces his horror credentials." Scream kings may branch out and work in other areas but always find their way back to the horror space when the right project comes along.

== History ==
=== Beginnings (1960s–1970s) ===
Donald Sutherland earned the title of scream king for his appearances in Castle of the Living Dead, Don't Look Now and Invasion of the Body Snatchers (1978).

Reggie Bannister has been given the title for starring in every Phantasm film, Bloody Bloody Bible Camp, Wishmaster, Silent Night, Deadly Night 4: Initiation, and The Mangler Reborn. Tom Atkins earnt the title for Tarantulas: The Deadly Cargo, Night of the Creeps, Halloween III, Trick, Maniac Cop, The Fog, My Bloody Valentine 3D, Drive Angry, and Creepshow.

=== 1980s ===
Bill Moseley earned the title for The Texas Chainsaw Massacre 2 and as Otis Driftwood in Rob Zombie’s Firefly trilogy, Silent Night, Deadly Night 3: Better Watch Out, Tom Savini’s Night of the Living Dead remake, and Army of Darkness among others. Jeffrey Combs has also earned the title for starring in Re-Animator, Dark House, Would You Rather, andThe Frighteners. Kane Hodder has been called a scream king for several of the Friday the 13th films, Wishmaster, the Hatchet franchise, Behind the Mask: The Rise of Leslie Vernon, and Chillerama. Kurt Russell has earned the title for appearing in Escape from New York, Escape from L.A., The Thing, Death Proof, Bone Tomahawk, and The Hateful Eight. Sam Neill has also been called a scream king for Omen III: The Final Conflict (1981), Possession (1981), Dead Calm (1989), In The Mouth Of Madness (1994), and Event Horizon (1997).

Actor Mark Patton, star of A Nightmare on Elm Street 2: Freddy's Revenge, has been touted at various conventions as mainstream horror's first "male scream queen" and as somebody with a satirical public image having homoerotic elements. He's also notable for being one of the first openly LGBT performers within that particular movie genre.

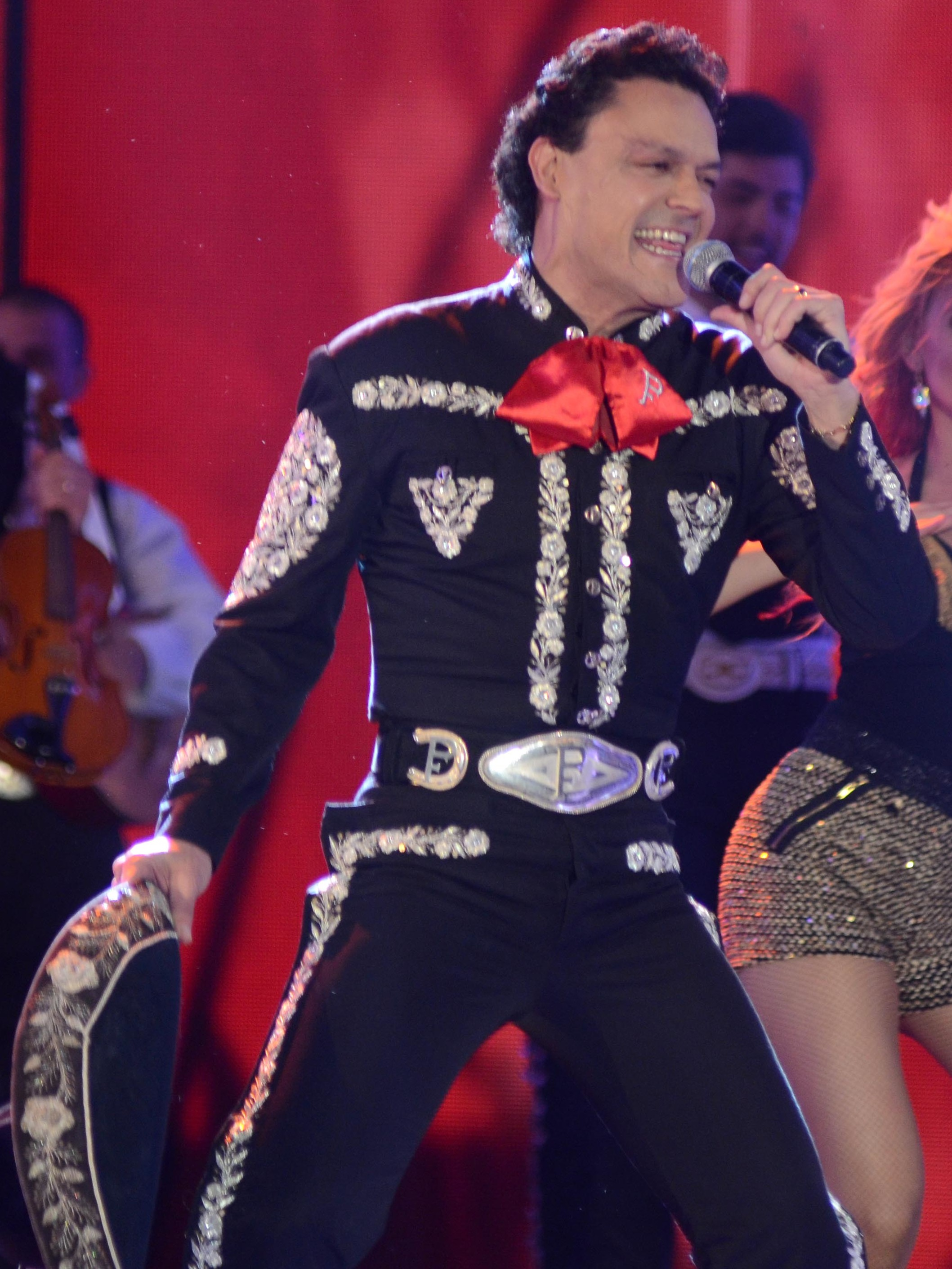
Singer and actor Pedro Fernández came to be known as the first Mexican scream king for his starring roles in 1980s horror films, specially for Vacaciones de terror (1989)

In 1989, the term was first introduced to Mexico by actor and singer Pedro Fernández, who had already raised to fame in the 1970s as a child actor. He became the horror movie hero of the cult supernatural horror Vacaciones de terror, which was followed by a 1991 sequel, Vacaciones de terror 2. He also established himself as a scream king through his starring roles in Pánico en la montaña (1989) and the slasher Trampa Infernal (1989).

=== 1990s ===
Josh Hartnett has been called a scream king for his roles in Halloween H20: 20 Years Later (1998), The Faculty (1998) and 30 Days of Night (2007). Elijah Wood has earned the title for The Faculty, Maniac (2012) and Come to Daddy (2019). Lochlyn Munro has been called a scream king for appearances in Freddy vs. Jason, Margaux, Dracula 2000, Needful Things, Trancers 4: Jack of Swords, seven episodes of the original Charmed series, a guest appearance on the USA Network’s The Dead Zone, and two guest spots on The Outer Limits. Thomas Jane has earned the title for appearances in She-Wolf of London, Buffy the Vampire Slayer, Deep Blue Sea, Dreamcatcher, The Mist, 1922, Into the Grizzly Maze, The Predator, Before I Wake, and Slayers. David Arquette has been called a scream king for the Scream franchise, Buffy the Vampire Slayer (1992), Eight Legged Freaks (2002), Riding the Bullet (2004), The Tripper, Ravenous (1999), and Bone Tomahawk.

=== 2000s ===
Ethan Hawke has earnt the title for his roles in Daybreakers, Sinister, The Purge, and The Black Phone. Justin Long has been called a scream king for Jeepers Creepers (2001), Drag Me to Hell (2009), Tusk (2014), and Barbarian (2022). Rory Culkin has been called a scream king for appearing in The Good Son, Signs, Scream 4, Intruders, Mean Creek, and The Last Thing Mary Saw.

=== 2010s ===
Jaeden Martell has also been called a scream king for his roles in It (2017), It Chapter Two (2019), The Lodge (2019), and Mr. Harrigan's Phone (2022). Anton Yelchin earnt the title for appearing in Fright Night (2011), Odd Thomas (2013), Burying the Ex (2014), and Green Room (2015). Evan Peters for his multiple roles in American Horror Story and Dahmer – Monster: The Jeffrey Dahmer Story (2022).

=== 2020s ===
Bill Skarsgard become an icon in the Horror genre thanks to his roles in It (2017), It Chapter Two (2019), Barbarian (2022), The Crow (2024), and Nosferatu (2024), as well as It: Welcome to Derry and Hemlock Grove. Austin Abrams recurring horror movie roles in Scary Stories to Tell in the Dark (2019), Weapons (2025), and Resident Evil (2026), have given him the status of scream king.

== List of scream kings ==
Years active	Actor	First horror film (or series)	Notes
1902–1956	Bela Lugosi	Dracula (1931)	Also known for White Zombie (1932), The Wolf Man (1941) and Island of Lost Souls (1932)
1902–1930	Lon Chaney	The Monster (1925)	Best known for The Hunchback of Notre Dame (1923) and The Phantom of the Opera (1925). He was nicknamed "the man of a thousand faces"
1916–1950	Edward Van Sloan	Dracula (1931)	Also known for The Mummy (1932) and Frankenstein (1931)
1919–1968	Boris Karloff	Frankenstein (1931)	Also known for The Mummy (1932)
1921–1976	Richard Arlen	The Ghost Breaker (1922)	Best known for Island of Lost Souls (1932)
1924–1953	David Manners	Dracula (1931)	Also known for The Mummy (1932)
1931–1971	Lon Chaney Jr.	Man-Made Monster (1941)	Best known for The Wolf Man (1941)
1935–1994	Peter Cushing	The Curse of Frankenstein (1957)	Also known for Dracula (1958) and The Mummy (1959)
1939–1995	Donald Pleasence	The Flesh and the Fiends (1960)	Best known for the Halloween franchise
1948–2015	Christopher Lee	The Curse of Frankenstein (1957)	ALSO known for The Mummy (1959) and Dracula (1958)
1953–1992	Anthony Perkins	Psycho (1960)	Best known for the Psycho franchise
1960–2023	Donald Sutherland	Castle of the Living Dead (1964)	Best known for Invasion of the Body Snatchers (1978)
1961–present	Lance Henriksen	Mansion of the Doomed (1976)	Best known for the Alien franchise and the Pumpkinhead film series
1962–present	Kurt Russell	The Thing (1982)	Best known for Escape from New York film series
1963–present	Tom Atkins	Tarantulas: The Deadly Cargo (1977)	Best known for The Fog (1980) and Halloween III: Season of the Witch (1982)
1970–present	Sam Neill	The Final Conflict (1981)	Best known for the Jurassic Park franchise
1971–present	Jeffrey Combs	Frightmare (1981)	Best known for the Re-Animator film series and The Frighteners (1996)
1973–present	Doug Bradley	Hellraiser (1987)	Best known for the Hellraiser franchise
1973–present	Kane Hodder	Alligator (1980)	Best known for the Hatchet film series and the Friday the 13th franchise
1973–present	Brad Dourif	Eyes of Laura Mars (1978)	Best known for the Child's Play franchise and Urban Legend (1998)
1975–2017	Bill Paxton	Butcher, Baker, Nightmare Maker (1981)	Best known for Weird Science (1985) and Near Dark (1987)
1976–present	Bruce Campbell	The Evil Dead (1981)	Best known for the Evil Dead franchise
1976–present	Pedro Fernández	Vacaciones de terror (1989)	Also known for Trampa Infernal (1989)
1976–present	Reggie Bannister	Phantasm (1979)	Best known for the Phantasm franchise
1979–present	Cary Elwes	Bram Stoker's Dracula (1992)	Best known for the Saw franchise
1980–present	Bill Moseley	Endangered Species (1982)	Best known for the Firefly trilogy and The Texas Chainsaw Massacre 2 (1986)
1981–present	Nicolas Cage	Vampire's Kiss (1989)	Best known for Mandy (2018), Color Out of Space (2019) and Longlegs (2024)
1982–present	Mark Patton	A Nightmare on Elm Street 2: Freddy's Revenge (1985)	Best known for the A Nightmare on Elm Street franchise
1985–present	Ethan Hawke	Daybreakers (2009)	Best known for Sinister (2012) and The Purge (2013)
1987–present	Lochlyn Munro	Needful Things (1993)	Also known for Dracula 2000 (2000) and Freddy vs. Jason (2003)
1988–present	Thomas Jane	Deep Blue Sea (1999)	Also known for The Mist (2007)
1989–present	Skeet Ulrich	The Craft (1996)	Best known for the Scream franchise
1990–present	David Arquette	Ghost Brigade (1993)	Best known for the Scream franchise and Eight Legged Freaks (2002)
1990–present	Matthew Lillard	Ghoulies III: Ghoulies Go to College (1991)	Best known for Scream (1996) and Five Nights at Freddys (2023)
1993–present	Rory Culkin	Signs (2002)	Best known for Scream 4 (2011) and Lords of Chaos (2018)
1994–present	Devon Sawa	Idle Hands (1999)	Best known for Final Destination (2000) and several roles in the Chucky television series (2021–2024)
1995–present	Patrick Wilson	Insidious (2010)	Best known for The Conjuring Universe franchise
1996–present	Jensen Ackles	Supernatural television series (2005–2020)	Also known for My Bloody Valentine 3D (2009)
1997–present	Josh Hartnett	Halloween H20: 20 Years Later (1998)	Best known for The Faculty (1998)
1999–present	Justin Long	Jeepers Creepers (2001)	Also known for Drag Me to Hell (2009), Tusk (2014) and Barbarian (2022)
1999–present	Jared Padalecki	Supernatural television series (2005–2020)	Also known for Cry Wolf (2005) and Friday the 13th (2009)
1999–present	Bill Skarsgård	It (2017)	Best known for It film series and Nosferatu (2024)
2000–present	Kyle Gallner	Sublime (2007)	Best known for A Nightmare on Elm Street (2010), Red State (2011) and Smile (2022)
2001–2025	James Ransone	Prom Night (2008)	Best known for Sinister film series (2012–2015) and It Chapter Two (2019)
2002–present	Oliver Jackson-Cohen	Dracula television series (2013–2014)	Best known for The Haunting of Hill House television series (2018) and The Invisible Man (2020)
2004–present	Evan Peters	An American Crime (2007)	Best known for several roles in the American Horror Story television series
2005–present	Alex Wolff	Hereditary (2018)	Also known for Old (2021) and A Quiet Place: Day One (2024)
2005–present	Jack O'Connell	Eden Lake (2008)	Best known for Sinners (2025) and 28 Years Later: The Bone Temple (2026)
2006–present	Daniel Kaluuya	Get Out (2017)	Also known for Nope (2022)
2008–present	LaKeith Stanfield	The Purge: Anarchy (2014)	Best known for Get Out (2017)
2013–present	Jaeden Martell	It (2017)	Best known for the It film series and Mr. Harrigan's Phone (2022)
2016–present	Mason Gooding	Scream (2022)	Also known for Scream VI (2023), Heart Eyes (2025) and Scream 7 (2026)
2019–present	Austin Abrams	Scary Stories to Tell in the Dark	Best known for Weapons and Resident Evil (2026)
2021–present	Tyriq Withers	I Know What You Did Last Summer (2025)	Also known for Him (2025)
