= Los chiflados del rock and roll =

- Directed by: José Díaz Morales
- Written by: Alfredo Salazar; Pedro de Urdimalas
- Produced by: Guillermo Calderón
- Starring: Luis Aguilar; Agustín Lara; Pedro Vargas; Eulalio González «Piporro» Lina Salomé; Delia Magaña; Rosita Arenas; Gloria Ríos
- Cinematography: Enrique Wallace
- Edited by: Jorge Bustos
- Music by: Antonio Díaz Conde
- Production company: Clasa Films
- Distributed by: Cinematográfica Calderón
- Release date: February 27, 1957
- Running time: 80 minutes
- Country: Mexico
- Language: Spanish

Los chiflados del rock and roll (English: The Stooges of Rock and Roll) is a 1957 Mexican musical comedy film, directed by José Díaz Morales and starring Luis Aguilar, Agustín Lara and Pedro Vargas. The supporting cast includes Eulalio González «Piporro», Lina Salomé, Delia Magaña, Rosita Arenas and Gloria Ríos. It is a sequel to the film of the same year, Los tres bohemios, in which Magaña and Salomé also acted alongside Lorena Velázquez.

== Plot ==
Luis, Agustín, Pedro, Ana, and Clara, the five owners of the Los Bohemios cabaret, eventually fall into debt after Agustín spends most of their money on a costly inauguration. Without the funds to repay the debt, Luis and his business partners decide to seek monetary help from his uncle Apolonio Aguilar, an eccentric millionaire rancher, who lives in San Miguel el Alto. When they travel to ask Apolonio to lend them the money, he refuses and lies, saying that his millions were swindled from him. Though Apolonio is reluctant to lend money to Luis, he sees his nephew as a potential husband for his tough, orphaned goddaughter Paloma who, in fact, falls in love with Luis. Luis, already in a relationship with Ana, decides to obtain the money from Paloma by inviting her to become a partner of the cabaret, which she misinterprets, believing that he is proposing marriage to her. Paloma accepts and becomes one of the principal performers of the cabaret, showcased as a ranchera singer. Once she discovers that Luis is already romantically involved with Ana (though actually they had broken their relationship shortly before), Paloma becomes disillusioned with Luis and decides to leave the cabaret and travel back to San Miguel el Alto, where she finds Luis, who eventually recognizes his love for her.

== Cast ==
Film cast, from left to right: Magaña, Salomé, Vargas, Lara, and Aguilar.

- Luis Aguilar as Luis
- Agustín Lara as Agustín
- Pedro Vargas as Pedro
- Rosita Arenas as Paloma Domínguez
- Eulalio González as Don Apolonio Aguilar
- Lina Salomé as Ana
- Delia Magaña as Clara
- Richard as Macario
- Roberto G. Rivera as Stagehand
- Arturo "Bigotón" Castro as Peasant
- Francisco Reiguera as Don Secundino

== Release ==
The film was premiered on February 27, 1957 in the Orfeón theater in Mexico City for three weeks.

== Songs ==
- "Flor de lis", written and performed by Agustín Lara.
- "Se me hizo fácil", written by Agustín Lara and performed by Rosita Arenas.
- "Rosa de Francia", written and performed by Agustín Lara.
- "El cascarazo", written and performed by Eulalio González.
- "Serenata huasteca", written by José Alfredo Jiménez and performed by Rosita Arenas.
- "Que manera de perder", written by Cuco Sánchez and performed by Rosita Arenas.
- "Fallaste corazón", public domain, performed by Luis Aguilar.
