= Carrusel de las Américas =

Mexican television series

- Genre: Children's telenovela Comedy; Drama
- Created by: Abel Santa Cruz
- Written by: Carlos Romero; Jorge Núñez; Valeria Phillips; Dolores Ortega; María de Jesús Arellano
- Directed by: Raquel Parot; Dina de Marco
- Starring: Gabriela Rivero; Ricardo Blume; Saby Kamalich; Irán Eory; Luis Guillermo Martell; Marisol Centeno; Marisol Santacruz
- Opening theme: Carrusel de las Américas by Children of cast
- Country of origin: Mexico
- Original language: Spanish
- No. of episodes: 120

Production
- Executive producer: Valentín Pimstein
- Producer: Verónica Pimstein
- Cinematography: Gabriel Vázquez Bulmán; Noé Alcántara
- Running time: 21-22 minutes
- Production company: Televisa

Original release
- Network: Canal 4 Canal de las Estrellas
- Release: 20 April – 12 October 1992

Related
- Carrusel (1989); La Pícara Soñadora (1991) ¡Vivan los niños! (2002)

Carrusel de las Américas (English title: Carousel of the Americas) is a Mexican Children's telenovela produced by Valentín Pimstein for Televisa in 1992. It is both a sequel and remake of 1989 telenovela Carrusel. Chain member of the memorial project Americas 500 years since the discovery of America. It was shown via satellite to Latin America as part of that program block.

Gabriela Rivero starred as protagonist, while Irán Eory, Ricardo Blume, Saby Kamalich and Marisol Santacruz starred as stellar performances.

== Cast ==
The children

- Luis Guillermo Martell as Julio "Pollito" Rochild
- Marisol Centeno as Agustina "Nena" Martínez
- Daniel Edid Bracamontes as Jacobo Bernstein
- Giuliana Rivero as Ana Lucrecia de las Casas y Palacios
- Romina Prieto as Flor Alegría
- Kalimba Marichal as Martín Parra
- Rafael Bazán as Felipe Travieso
- Francis Recinas as Ernestina Travieso
- Juan Cid as Enrique Fideo
- Janet Pineda as Dulce Castillo
- Toshi Hazama as Murakami Hikaru
- Alejandra Ley as Carola Rueda
- Erik Sánchez as Jesús "Chucho" Pérez
- Fernando Lavín as Reynaldo Rico
- Tamara Shanath as "Sam" Niña Gringa
- Valentina Garibay
- Francisco Huerdo
- Frangueny

The adults

- Gabriela Rivero as Teacher Ximena Fernández
- Ricardo Blume as Don Pedro Huamán
- Saby Kamalich as Rosa de Huamán
- Jacqueline Moguel as Carmen
- Irán Eory as Doña Marcelina de Rochild
- Alma Delfina as Teacher Lupita
- Marisol Santacruz as Alejandra Palacios de de las Casas
- Wolf Ruvinskis as Don Mariano
- Alejandro Aragón as Federico
- Rosángela Balbó as Bertha
- Rafael del Villar as Gustavo Rico
- Edgardo Gazcón as Félix
- Elvira Monsell as Bernarda
- René Muñoz as Álvaro Parra
- Carlos Bonavides as Anselmo
- Armando Palomo as José Zamora
- Renata Flores as Mrs. Directora Martirio Solís
- Mariana Garza as Consuelo
- Janet Ruiz as Teacher Susana
- Erika Buenfil
- Socorro Bonilla
- Carlos Espejel
- Leticia Perdigón
- Diana Golden
- Raquel Pankowsky
- Mauricio Islas
- Stephanie Salas
- Gloria Izaguirre
- Roberto Mateos
- José María Torre
- Sara Montes
- Frances Ondiviela
- Claudio Báez
- Margarita Gralia
- Aurora Molina
- Ana María Aguirre
- Germán Bernal
- Guadalupe Bolaños
- Juan Carlos Bonet
- Shanik Berman
- Óscar Bonfiglio
- Octavio Galindo
- Margarita Isabel
- Gilda Méndez
- Jorge Pascual Rubio
- Laura Sotelo
- Jorge Miyamoto
- María Marcucci
- Brenda María
- Patricia Eguía
- Elías Rubio
- Raúl Askenazi
- Juan Carlos Serrán
- María Luisa Kimura
- Jonathan Axel Ruiz Peña

== Awards ==
Year	Award	Category	Nominee	Result
1993	11th TVyNovelas Awards	Best Child Performance	Luis Guillermo Martell	Nominated

== International Broadcasters of Carrusel ==
North & South American

- Mexico
- El Salvador
- Colombia
- United States
- Venezuela
- Brazil
- Paraguay
- Peru
- Chile

Europe & Asia

- Greece
- South Korea
