= Your Memory and Me =

- Directed by: Miguel M. Delgado
- Written by: Eduardo Galindo; Ramón Pérez Peláez
- Produced by: Eduardo Galindo; Jesús Galindo
- Starring: Rosita Arenas, Domingo Soler
- Cinematography: Ignacio Torres
- Edited by: José W. Bustos
- Music by: José de la Vega
- Production company: Producciones Galindo Hermanos
- Release date: 25 June 1953
- Country: Mexico
- Language: Spanish

Your Memory and Me (Spanish: Tu recuerdo y yo) is a 1953 Mexican comedy drama film directed by Miguel M. Delgado and starring Rosita Arenas and Domingo Soler.

== Cast ==
- Rosita Arenas
- Lupe Carriles
- Agustín Isunza
- Raúl Martínez
- Diana Ochoa
- Chula Prieto
- Carlota Solares
- Domingo Soler
- Fernando Soto "Mantequilla"
- Pedro Vargas

== Bibliography ==
- María Luisa Amador. Cartelera cinematográfica, 1950-1959. UNAM, 1985.
