= Rosita Arenas =

Mexican actress (born 1933)

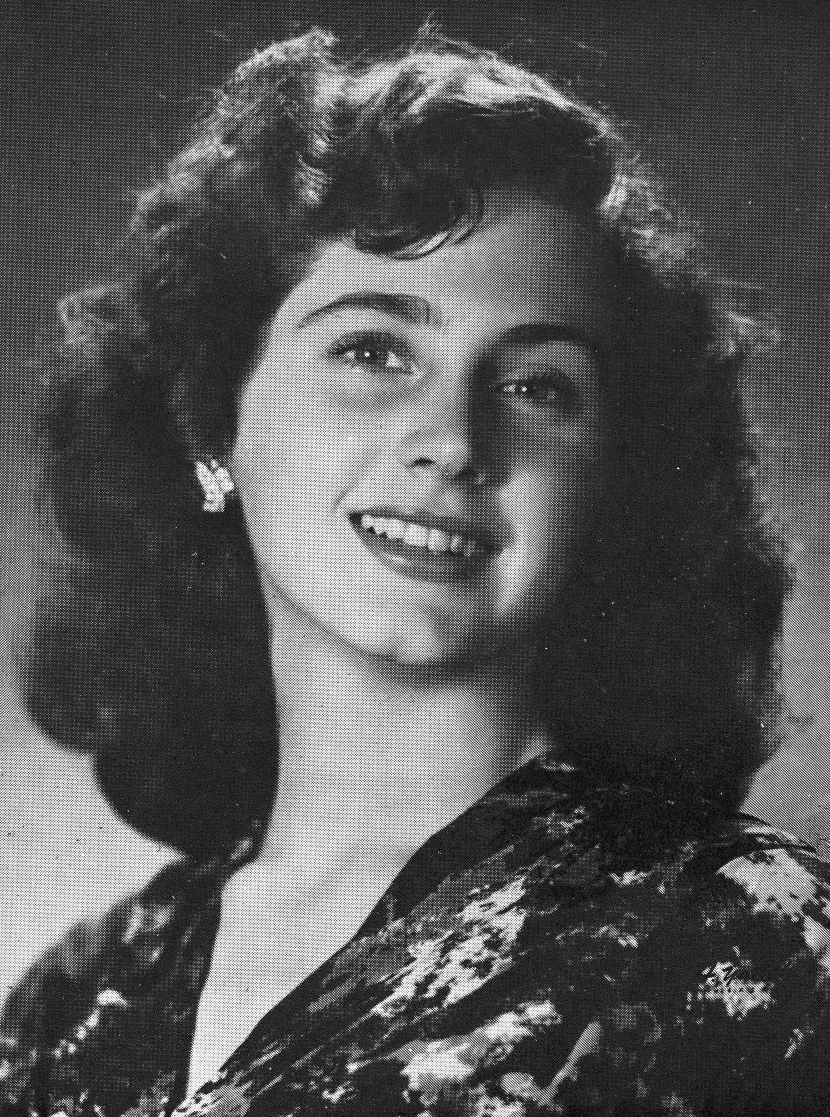
- Arenas in 1954
- Born: Rosa Arenas; 19 August 1933 (age 93); Caracas, Venezuela
- Other name: Rosa Arenas
- Occupation: Actress
- Years active: 1950–1963; 1987–1994; 2020, 2022
- Spouse: Abel Salazar (m. 1960; div. 1980)
- Children: 2, including Rosa Salazar Arenas

Rosa Arenas (born 19 August 1933) is a Mexican actress. She became a Mexican scream queen through her appearances in horror films, such as in La Momia Azteca film series and in her starring roles in El espejo de la bruja (1962) and La maldición de la Llorona (1963).

== Life and career ==
She was born in Caracas, Venezuela, but was registered in Mexico as the daughter of Spanish actor Miguel Arenas. After settling in Mexico City, she enrolled at the Motolinía School—a private Catholic institution—where she pursued her academic studies while simultaneously developing an interest in acting, thanks to her father's influence.

At age 16, she was named Reina de la Primavera (Queen of the Spring), and subsequently made her film debut in Anacleto se divorcia (1950). She received more important roles in ¡¿Qué te ha dado esa mujer?! (1951), with Pedro Infante and Luis Aguilar, and El señor fotógrafo (1953), with Cantinflas. She also tried her hand at singing; in Los chiflados del rock and roll (1957), she sang the songs "Se me hizo fácil", "Serenata huasteca", and "Qué manera de perder".

On 1 August 1960, she married actor, director, and film producer Abel Salazar, with whom she had two daughters: Rosa Salazar Arenas, who followed in their footsteps to become an actress and writer, and Claudia Salazar Arenas, who grow up to be a chef. Following the release of Attack of the Mayan Mummy (1964)—an unsuccessful Mexican-American TV movie (a U.S. version of La momia azteca) in which she appeared uncredited—she retired from the entertainment industry to care for her daughters. Around 1980, she divorced Abel Salazar.

== Selected filmography ==
- Anacleto se divorcia (1950)
- Fierecilla (1951)
- ¿Qué te ha dado esa mujer? (1951)
- La hija del ministro (1952)
- El Bruto (1953)
- El plebeyo (1953)
- Tu recuerdo y yo (1953)
- El señor fotógrafo (1953)
- Los chiflados del rock and roll (1957)
- La momia azteca (1957)
- La maldición de la momia azteca (1957)
- Escuela de rateros (1958)
- La momia azteca contra el robot humano (1958)
- La noche y el alba (1958)
- El espejo de la bruja (1962)
- La maldición de la Llorona (1963)
- Attack of the Mayan Mummy (1964)
