= ¿Qué te ha dado esa mujer? =

1951 Mexican comedy film directed by Ismael Rodríguez

What Has That Woman Done to You?
- Directed by: Ismael Rodríguez
- Written by: Ismael Rodríguez; Pedro de Urdimalas
- Produced by: Luis Leal Solares
- Starring: Pedro Infante; Luis Aguilar; Rosa Arenas; Gloria Mange; Carmen Montejo
- Cinematography: Jack Draper
- Edited by: Rafael Portillo
- Music by: Sergio Guerrero; Raúl Lavista
- Production company: Películas Rodríguez
- Release date: 20 December 1951
- Running time: 100 minutes
- Country: Mexico
- Language: Spanish

¿Qué te ha dado esa mujer? (transl. What Has That Woman Given You?) is a 1951 Mexican comedy film directed by Ismael Rodríguez and starring Pedro Infante, Luis Aguilar, Rosa Arenas, Gloria Mange and Carmen Montejo. It is the sequel to the film of the same year, A.T.M. ¡A toda máquina!.

== Cast ==
- Pedro Infante as Pedro Chávez Pérez
- Luis Aguilar as Luis Macías Valadez
- Rosa Arenas as Marianela
- Gloria Mange as Ruth
- Emma Rodríguez as Doña Angustias
- Manuel Arvide as Don Antonio
- Ángel Infante as the commander
- Manuel Noriega as the priest
- Carmen Montejo as Yolanda
- Ricardo Camacho as the male nurse
- Jorge Casanova as rival lover to Marianela
- Rogelio Fernández as kidnapper
- Elodia Hernández as Ruth's mother
- Mario Humberto Jiménez Pons as Angustias’ son
- Luis Leal Solares as commander
- Chel López as doctor
- Concepción Martínez as the little old lady visiting the apartment
- Bruno Márquez as the delegate
- José Pardavé as the ticketed motorist
- Salvador Quiroz as General
- Carlos Rincón Gallardo as Angustias’ husband
- Aurora Ruiz as Ruth's mother's servant
- María Luisa Smith as the old lady outside the church
- María Valdealde as the restaurant proprietress
- Alfredo Varela padre as the hotel manager
- Manuel Vergara 'Manver' as the drunk driver
- Acela Vidaurri as Chonita the vendor

== Bibliography ==
- Juanita Heredia. Transnational Latina Narratives in the Twenty-first Century. Palgrave Macmillan, 2009.
