= Lina Salomé =

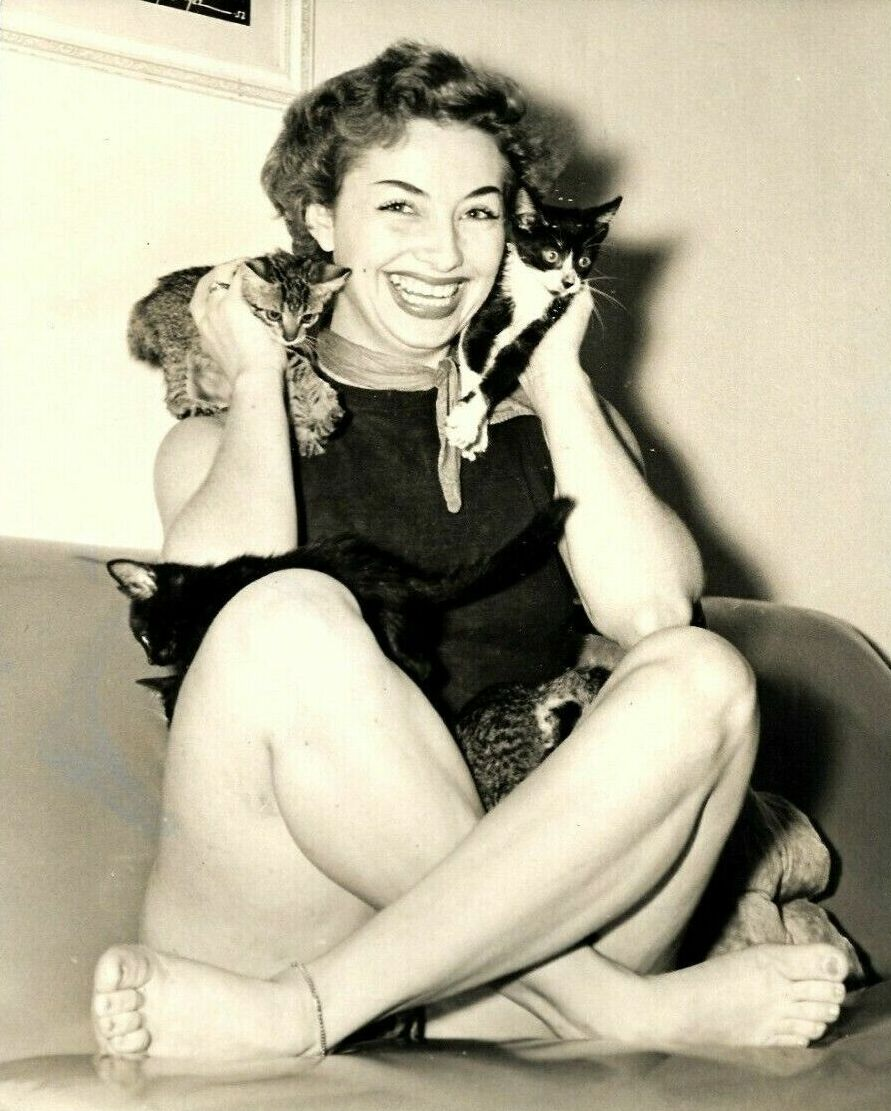
Lina Salomé, 1950

Luz de Peña Matos Estévez (October 30, 1930 — February 25, 2001) known by her stage name Lina Salomé, was a Cuban-born Mexican dancer and actress.

== Filmography ==
Year	Title	Role	Notes
1952	es:Mi campeón	Dancer	Film debut
1952	The Lie	Dancer	
1956	El vividor		
1956	Bodas de oro	Genoveva	
1957	Los chiflados del rock and roll	Ana Prado	
1957	Alma de acero	Rosa	First female lead role
1957	Los tres bohemios	Ana Prado	
