= Marisol Santacruz =

Mexican actress, comedian

- Born: Marisol Santacruz Banuelos; 16 February 1970 (age 56); Mexico City
- Occupation: Actor
- Years active: 1982-2013
- Known for: Rostro de El Heraldo

Marisol Santacruz Bañuelos (born 16 February 1970 in Mexico City, Federal District) is an actress, comedian, hostess, model, and a former winner of Rostro de El Heraldo, a beauty contest for the Mexican newspaper El Heraldo.

== Biography ==
Marisol Santacruz started her artistic career after being named the Face of El Heraldoro: this served as a window to start work on public campaigns like "La Rubia superior," or "Top Blonde," and a time after came her first opportunity inside the world of telenovelas.

She has been educated at many places, such as Instituto Nacional de Bellas Artes Mexico, Centro de Estudios Artisticos (CEA) de Televisa Mexico, and Escuela Cinomatografica Rusa.

Alcanzar una estrella II was her first melodrama, followed by Atrapada, a production by Ernesto Alonso in which she played the character Margarita Gralia y Frank Moro. At the same time that she made her first appearances on television, she studied at the INBA and later joined the CEA de Televisa.

Carrusel de las Américas was her first opportunity to play an antagonist. She gave life to the ambitious character Alejandra, and earned an award in Brazil, where her telenovela was a success. Years later, Emilio Larrosa invited her to play the main juvenile villain in the telenovela Mágica juventud, in which she played the envious Patricia Grimaldi. In the telenovela Marimar she had a small part playing Monica, the villain's best friend. In Lazos de amor her character was Patricia, but her great return to villainous characters was in Cañaveral de pasiones, where she gave life to the sexy villain Gina Elizondo: the movie had good reviews and celebrated her as a villain. In 1999 Juan Osorio offered her the part of Leticia in Nunca te olvidaré, a character different than those she had played in the past. This character is not a villain but a good, simple, young woman. In 2000 she participated in the telenovela Carita de ángel giving life to "Angélica." This serious part was her most remembered and notable role at this point in her career. She was also in telenovelas like Niña amada mía, Rebelde, Querida enemiga, Camaleones, and Soy tu dueña. One of her most popular roles was in the melodrama Dos hogares in which she played "Mara".

Santacruz admires actors like Helena Rojo, Ignacio López Tarso, Ofelia Gilmain, Iran Eory, Silvia Derbez y Carmen Montejo. She has participated in La marca del Zorro, Carita de ángel, El Tenorio Clásico and Yo miento, tú mientes, todos mentimos, and others.

In the area of cinematography, Corazón de tequila, El corrido de Santa Amalia, Jóvenes amantes y Trampa infernal are examples of her dramatic capacities.

Since 2003 it has been possible to see a new side to her talent as a host in the program Buenos días, transmitted from a local channel called Televisa Toluca. In addition, she was also in La casa de la risa with Jorge Ortiz de Pinedo, a comedy.

2011 marked her return to telenovelas with Dos hogares, a story starring Anahí, Sergio Goyri and Carlos Ponce. In November 2012, Santacruz posed for a cover of Playboy. In 2013 she started a special role in the telenovela de Emilio Larrosa Libre para amarte.

== Family ==
She is married and has one son.

== Filmography ==
=== Telenovelas ===
- Libre para amarte (2013) - Alicia Palacio Robles
- Dos hogares (2011–2012) - Mara Acevedo Sandoval de Lagos
- Soy tu dueña (2010) - Cecilia Rangel de Villalba
- Camaleones (2009–2010) - Magdalena Orozco
- Querida enemiga (2008) - Candelaria
- Rebelde (2004–2006) - Lourdes de la Riva / Sonia
- Nina amada mía (2003) - Isabela Rivera de Uriarte / de Soriano
- Carita de ángel (2000–2001) - Angélica Valle de Larios
- Alma rebelde (1999) - Laiza Montemayor
- Nunca te olvidaré (1999) - Leticia Magaña Polanco
- Cañaveral de pasiones (1996) - Gina Elizondo
- Lazos de amor (1995–1996) - Patricia
- Marimar (1994) - Mónica de la Colina
- Mágica juventud (1992–1993) - Patricia Grimaldi "La Güera"
- Carrusel de las Américas (1992) - Alejandra Palacios de De las Casas
- Atrapada (1991–1992) - Sonia Montero Baeza
- Alcanzar una estrella II (1991) - Stacy Loveli Norton

=== Programs ===
- Estrella2 (2014) - Invitada
- Como dice el dicho (2012–2016) - Mayra / Maite / Alma
- La rosa de Guadalupe (2011) - Ingrid
- Mujer, casos de la vida real (2002–2005) - Cecilia
- Big Brother (2004) - Participante
- La casa de la risa (2003–2005) - Varios
- Al derecho y al derbez (1994)

=== Movies ===
- El sacristán (2013) - Gema
- Mujeres de hierro (2009) - Amanda Rey
- Amores y pasiones (2007) - Marisa
- Coyote, el lamento de un mojado (2005) - Eva
- Más allá del vacío (2004)
- La banda del Antrax (2002) - Jimena
- Corazón de tequila (2000) - Fernanda
- El Corrido de Santa Amalia (1998) - Perla
- Aunque seas ajena (1998) - Dulce / Elisa
- Jóvenes amantes (1997) - Juliana Fontait
- Amor de diamante (1995) - Fatzy Cardenal
- Trampa infernal (1990) - Carlota Valencia
- Solamente solos (1982) - Sahily

== Awards and nominations ==
=== Premios TVyNovelas ===
Year	Category	Telenovela	Result
1993	Best Villain	Mágica juventud	Nominated
