= Kalimba (singer) =

Mexican singer and actor

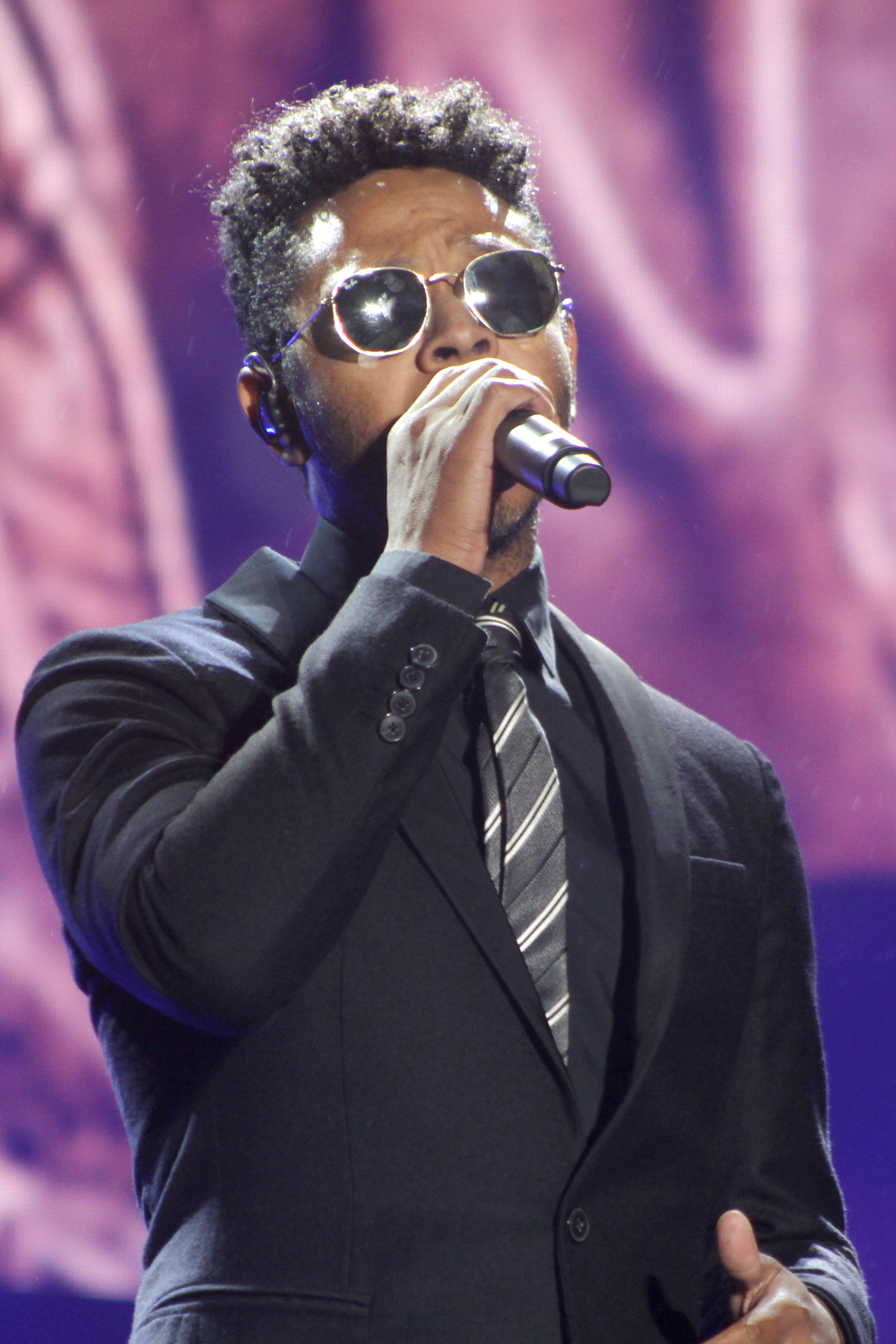
- Kalimba in 2019
- Born: Kalimba Kadjaly Marichal Ibar; 26 July 1982 (age 43); Mexico City, Mexico
- Occupations: Singer; actor
- Years active: 1984–present
- Relatives: M'balia Marichal (sister), Julia Marichal (aunt)

Kalimba Kadjaly Marichal Ibar (born 26 July 1982), known mononymously as Kalimba, is a Mexican singer and actor.

== Career ==
Kalimba was born in Mexico City to Afro-Cuban parents. He and his sister M'balia were both given traditional African names. His parents, especially his father, were involved in music and theatre.

Kalimba began his career at the age of three. He and his sister M'balia Marichal began performing in theatre and on television. Kalimba appeared on shows such as Chiquilladas and Chispas de chocolate (in which he shared credit with his sister and his father). At the same time he participated in the telenovela Carrusel de las Américas.

In 1993, Kalimba joined La Onda Vaselina as part of the Mexican pop group OV7, participating in the album La Banda Rock. After leaving the group in 1996, he returned to dubbing with work in films such as Disney's The Lion King where he sang as the voice of Simba for the song I Just Can't Wait to Be King (Yo Quisiera Ya Ser El Rey), and James and the Giant Peach. He voiced in the Latin Spanish dub of Akira, as well as the eponymous character in Chicken Little and Kitarō in GeGeGe no Kitarō. Other works include the voice of Kit Cloudkicker in TaleSpin, the voice of Arnold in Hey Arnold!, the voice of Lucky in 101 Dalmatians: The Series, Alan Parrish (kid) in the Original latin american dub of Jumanji, and the telenovela "Carrusel de las Américas".

Kalimba is also known for his acting, appearing in Héroes verdaderos (2010), Broken Sky (2006) and Chispas de chocolate (1986).

== Criminal complaint and dismissal ==
In January 2011, an arrest warrant was issued for Kalimba in Mexico after an allegation that he raped a 17-year-old girl in a hotel room after a concert in Chetumal, Quintana Roo, on 18 December 2010. Traveling to the USA, Kalimba was arrested on 20 January 2011 on immigration charges in El Paso, Texas and turned in to PGR back in Mexico. He was released on 27 January 2011 due to lack of evidence.

== Discography ==
=== Studio albums ===
- Aerosoul (2004)
- NegroKlaro (2007)
- Mi otro Yo (2008)
- Amar Y Querer: Homenaje A Las Grandes Canciones (2009)
- Homenaje A Las Grandes Canciones, Vol. II (2011)
- Cena para Desayunar (2014)
- Somos Muchos Y Venimos Todos (2019)

== See also ==
- List of Afro-Latinos
