= Nunca te olvidaré (TV series) =

- Genre: Telenovela
- Written by: Marcia del Río; Alberto Gómez
- Story by: Caridad Bravo Adams
- Directed by: Adriana Barraza; Sergio Jiménez
- Starring: Edith González; Fernando Colunga; Alma Muriel
- Theme music composer: Enrique Iglesias
- Opening theme: "Nunca Te Olvidaré" by Enrique Iglesias
- Country of origin: Mexico
- Original language: Spanish
- No. of episodes: 94

Production
- Executive producer: Juan Osorio
- Producer: Carlos Moreno
- Cinematography: Luis Toledo; Alejandro Álvarez Ceniceros
- Editor: Ricardo Rodrígue
- Camera setup: Multi-camera

Original release
- Network: Canal de las Estrellas
- Release: January 18 – May 28, 1999

Related
- Jamais Te Esquecerei

Nunca te olvidaré (English: Never forget you) is a Mexican telenovela produced by Juan Osorio and Carlos Moreno Laguillo for Televisa in 1999. It is based on a novel by Caridad Bravo Adams. It aired on Canal de Las Estrellas from January 18, 1999 to May 28, 1999.

Edith González and Fernando Colunga starred as protagonists, while Alma Muriel, Humberto Elizondo, Eugenia Cauduro and Alejandra Procuna starred as antagonists.

== Plot ==
Don Antonio Uribe lives with his family on his ranch, near the city of Guanajuato. One day, he receives a message from Clara Isabel Martel, his young love, calling him to her deathbed. Clara Isabel begs him as a last will to take care of her daughter, Esperanza, and he promises to be a second father to the girl. Consuelo, Antonio's wife, resents Esperanza's presence and treats her very badly, while her son, Luis Gustavo, is immediately attracted to Esperanza. Consuelo is enraged by her son's feelings and decides to separate the children by sending Luis Gustavo to study abroad and putting Esperanza in a school run by nuns.

On the other hand, Fermín Requena, Antonio's neighbor and friend, is a widower and has a daughter, Silvia, who is spoiled and self-centered. Silvia is jealous of the affection that Luis Gustavo feels for Esperanza and pressures her father to also send her to study abroad so that she can be close to Luis Gustavo. However, Luis Gustavo is unable to forget Esperanza and sees Silvia only as a friend.

Ten years later, Esperanza, turned into a beautiful young woman, returns to the ranch to take care of Don Antonio, who is mortally ill. There he meets the Moraima brothers, who now own almost all of Don Antonio's land, won by a legal dispute that Fermín lost. One of the brothers, Juan Moraima, falls in love with Esperanza.

Before dying, Don Antonio gives Fermín a letter for his son in which he gives him the blessing if he decides to marry Esperanza. Luis Gustavo returns home for the funeral and when he sees Esperanza, he falls madly in love with her. However, Esperanza's beauty also awakens love in Fermín's heart; Determined to possess her, he hides the letter and hatches a sinister plan with the help of Consuelo to permanently separate the couple.

Consuelo makes Luis Gustavo believe that Esperanza is her father's illegitimate daughter, and therefore her half-sister. Horrified, Luis Gustavo decides to commit himself to Silvia and immediately leaves the country, abandoning the woman he loves, without having the courage to reveal the truth of his abandonment. Esperanza remains disappointed, believing that Luis Gustavo has stopped loving her, while he suffers in silence for that love.

== Cast ==
=== Main ===
- Edith González as Esperanza Gamboa Martel / Isabel Clara Martel
- Fernando Colunga as Luis Gustavo Uribe Del Valle
- Alma Muriel as Consuelo Del Valle de Uribe

==== Secondary ====
- Eugenia Cauduro as Silvia Requena Ortiz
- Delia Casanova as Doña Carmen
- Humberto Elizondo as Fermín Requena
- Leticia Perdigón as Gudelia
- Zully Keith as Irene
- Marisol Santacruz as Leticia
- Sergio Catalán as Juan Moraima
- Juan Carlos Bonet as Eduardo "Lalo" Moraima
- Pablo Montero as Álvaro Cordero
- Niurka Marcos as Alcatraz Cordero
- Wendy González as Child Esperanza Gamboa Martel
- Daniel Habif as Child Luis Gustavo Uribe Del Valle
- Dulce María as Child Silvia Requena Ortiz
- Gaby Garza as Child Leticia
- Diego Sieres as Child Adrián
- Édgar Ponce as Adrián
- Liliana Arriaga as La Chupitos
- Silvia Caos as Serafina Pérez
- Roberto Miquel as Robert
- Julián Pastor as Don Antonio Uribe
- Macaria as Berenice Cordero
- Miguel de León as Dr. Leonel Valderrama

=== Recurring ===
- Eric del Castillo as Licenciado Mendez
- Julio Alemán as Juez Mancebo

=== Special performances ===
- Josefina Echánove as Sor Margarita
- Octavio Galindo as Dr. Carlos Bárcenas
- Amparo Garrido as Madre Superiora
- Jaime Lozano as Higinio Sánchez
- Carlos Rotzinger as Arcadio
- Gustavo Negrete as Justo

=== Guest starts ===
- Johnny Laboriel as Johnny
- Tony Flores as Unknown character
- Toño Infante as Braulio
- Bárbara Ferré as Bárbara
