= The Lie (1952 film) =

1952 film

- Directed by: Juan José Ortega
- Written by: Juan José Ortega
- Based on: The Lie by Caridad Bravo Adams
- Produced by: Juan José Ortega
- Starring: Marga López; Jorge Mistral; Gina Cabrera
- Cinematography: Agustín Martínez Solares
- Edited by: Rafael Ceballos
- Music by: Rosalío Ramírez
- Production company: Compañía Cinematográfica Mexicana
- Release date: 9 October 1952
- Running time: 97 minutes
- Country: Mexico
- Language: Spanish

The Lie (Spanish: La Mentira) is a 1952 Mexican romantic drama film directed by Juan José Ortega and starring Marga López, Jorge Mistral and Gina Cabrera. It was shot at the Televisa San Ángel in Mexico City and on location in Cuba. The film's sets were designed by the art director Jorge Fernández.

== Cast ==
- Marga López as Verónica Castillo Blanco
- Jorge Mistral as Demetrio Robles
- Gina Cabrera as Virginia Castillo Blanco
- Alberto González Rubio as Alberto
- Andrea Palma as Adela Botel
- Domingo Soler as Dr. Jaime Botel
- Arturo Soto Rangel as Padre Gregorio
- Liliana Durán as Rosita
- Mimí Derba as Tía Sara
- Manuel Dondé as Indio
- Bruno Márquez as Francois Dupont
- Salvador Quiroz as Don Ramiro Castillo Blanco
- Alberto Mariscal as Ricardo Silva
- Ana Gloria as Bailarina
- Rolando as Bailarín
- Lina Salomé as Bailarina
- Miguel Aceves Mejía as Cantante

== Bibliography ==
- Amador, María Luisa. Cartelera cinematográfica, 1950-1959. UNAM, 1985.
- Berumen, Frank Javier Garcia. Brown Celluloid: 1894-1959. Vantage Press, 2003.
- Riera, Emilio García. Historia documental del cine mexicano: 1951-1952. Universidad de Guadalajara, 1992
