= The Witch's Mirror =

1962 film by Chano Urueta

- Theatrical release poster
- Directed by: Chano Urueta
- Written by: Alfredo Ruanova; Carlos Enrique Taboada
- Produced by: Abel Salazar
- Starring: Rosita Arenas; Armando Calvo; Isabela Corona; Dina de Marco
- Distributed by: Alameda Films
- Release date: 1960
- Running time: 75 minutes
- Country: Mexico
- Language: Spanish

The Witch's Mirror (Spanish: El espejo de la bruja) is a 1960 (Note: Attributed to multiple sources:) Mexican supernatural horror film directed by Chano Urueta, written by Alfredo Ruanova and Carlos Enrique Taboada, and produced by Abel Salazar. The film's plot follows the murder of a wife, Elena (Dina de Marco), by her husband Eduardo (Armando Calvo); Elena's godmother Sara (Isabela Corona) seeks revenge on Eduardo and Eduardo's new wife Deborah (Rosita Arenas) by using a mirror to summon Elena's ghost.

== Plot ==
Sara is a witch who works as a housekeeper for her goddaughter Elena and Elena's husband, a doctor named Eduardo. Sara and Elena learn from a magic mirror that someone seeks to murder Elena. Sara calls upon otherworldly spirits to reveal the identity of the person who is to kill Elena, and the mirror shows that it is Eduardo. The mirror also shows the face of a woman whose identity neither Sara nor Elena know, but whom Sara deems to be Elena's "rival".

As Elena prepares to go to bed, Eduardo poisons a drink and brings it to her bedroom. Sara implores the spirits to protect Elena from harm, but a figure tells Sara that Elena must die and that Sara must not interfere. Elena consumes the drink before falling to the floor dead. Her body is laid in a coffin in a cemetery. Using her magic mirror, Sara is able to communicate with Elena's spirit, and promises to avenge her death.

Some time later, Eduardo has remarried, and introduces Sara to his new wife, Deborah. Eduardo shows Deborah around the house, and Deborah feels an icy draft in Elena's former room, despite the window being closed. The next day, Eduardo becomes upset when he hears Deborah playing a tune that Elena used to play on their piano. When Deborah attempts to replace tuberoses—Elena's favorite flower—with daisies in Elena's room, the daisies immediately wilt. Deborah demands of Sara that they remodel Elena's room and burn her possessions.

Inspecting a bookshelf, Deborah finds a diary that Elena kept without Eduardo's knowledge. She tries to show it to Eduardo, but it inexplicably vanishes before she can. More mysterious activity occurs: the fireplace suddenly dies, and the piano appears to play Deborah's favorite tune all by itself. Becoming increasingly frightened, Eduardo and Deborah deduce that Elena's vengeful spirit is haunting them. Deborah enters Elena's room and sees Elena in the mirror, which causes her to faint. Eduardo follows and, upon seeing Elena in the mirror, throws a lantern that shatters the mirror and starts a fire that severely burns Deborah's face and body.

Deborah's head and hands are wrapped in bandages. With the help of an assistant, Gustavo, Eduardo attempts to reconstruct Deborah's face through skin grafting, using the skin of three stolen cadavers: two taken from a morgue, and one from a funeral parlor. When a local female pianist apparently dies of a heart attack, Eduardo resolves to replace Deborah's burned hands with those of the recently deceased pianist. He and Gustavo dig up the pianist's coffin, only to discover that she has been prematurely buried. In his laboratory, Eduardo sedates the pianist and amputates her hands. Elsewhere in the house, Sara tells Gustavo to turn himself in to the police and report Eduardo's crimes.

While Eduardo is out of the lab, Sara throws the severed hands of the pianist into a furnace, and the disembodied hands of Elena's spirit take their place. Eduardo transplants the hands onto Deborah, after which Deborah involuntarily attempts to strangle Eduardo and play Elena's favorite tune on the piano. After coming across Sara chanting to spirits, Deborah runs into Eduardo's lab and discovers the bodies he had used in her procedures. Disgusted, Deborah denounces Eduardo as a murderer, until he removes the bandages on her head to reveal that he has perfectly reconstructed her face.

The authorities, alerted to the scene by Gustavo, break into the house. While embracing Eduardo, Deborah's hands again become possessed, and fatally stab Eduardo in the back with a pair of scissors. The lawmen and Gustavo burst into the room. Deborah's face and hands return to their disfigured states, while her transplanted hands drop to the ground, grab the scissors, and kill Gustavo before disappearing. In another room, with vengeance having been enacted, Sara vanishes into the air.

== Cast ==
- Rosita Arenas as Deborah
- Armando Calvo as Eduardo Ramos
- Isabela Corona as Sara
- Dina de Marco as Elena
- Carlos Nieto as Gustavo
- Alfredo Wally Barrón as Inspector

== Home media ==
In 2023, The Witch's Mirror was released on Blu-ray by Powerhouse Films, as part of a four-film box set titled Mexico Macabre: Four Sinister Tales from the Alameda Films Vault. Powerhouse Films also issued The Witch's Mirror on 31 October 2023 as a standalone Blu-ray release.
