= Vacaciones de terror =

- Directed by: René Cardona III
- Written by: René Cardona III, Santiago Galindo
- Starring: Julio Alemán; Pedro Fernández; Gabriela Hassel; Nuria Bages; Carlos East; Gianella Hassel Kus; Carlos East jr.; Ernesto East; Andaluz Russel
- Release date: 12 June 1989
- Running time: 92 minutes
- Country: Mexico
- Language: Spanish

Vacaciones de terror (English: 'Vacations of Terror') is a 1989 cult Mexican supernatural horror film starring Julio Alemán, Pedro Fernández and Gabriela Hassel. It was directed by Rene Cardona III, and the film's main plot follows a wealthy family during a weekend trip to a vacation house, only to be haunted by the spirit of an evil witch who was executed there many years ago.

The film became a cult classic in Mexican horror film history, mainly for its lead actor, Pedro Fernandez and its villain, the haunted doll. It was succeeded by a sequel: Vacations of Terror 2. A remake of the film is planned.

== Plot ==
In 1889, a mob led by an inquisitor ambushed and set ablaze a powerful witch whose powers are nullified by a sacred amulet; however, she swore revenge for her trial and subsequent execution. One hundred years later, in 1989, a young man named Julio trades his music player for the same amulet with a peasant. He is an aficionado of occultism, and when he tells his wealthy girlfriend Paulina, she convinces him to join her family trip to a recently inherited vacation house by her uncle in Valle de Bravo, Mexico.

They arrive at the vacation house. Paulina's family – her uncle Fernando, his pregnant wife Lorena, and their children Gaby and twins Jaime and Pedro – try to spend the weekend at the house, even though all of them, except for Paulina and Fernando, feel the house is ugly and unnerving. After Julio arrives, some strange phenomena occur, like eggs exploding, the electrical system suddenly improves, and Gaby has hallucinations and nightmares of the witch trial. The next day, while the children play around the house, Gaby falls into a pit where the witch's belongings were hidden. There, she finds and is drawn to a disturbing doll she keeps as a new toy.

During an argument with Gaby about her new doll, Lorena suffers pregnancy complications, forcing Fernando to take her to the closest hospital and leaving Paulina and Julio in charge of the children. Gaby then acts menacingly and strangely, claiming the doll talks to her and can somehow create paranormal phenomena, like hallucinations and object manipulations. As Fernando and Lorena have been gone longer than expected, Paulina and Julio do their best to keep the children safe. However, the doll takes over Gaby's body and attacks both teenagers, exposing its true nature. Meanwhile, at the hospital, Lorena warns her husband that their children are in danger and begs him to rescue them.

Julio tries to use the amulet against the doll, but is trapped inside a mirror. Gaby, under the doll's influence, tries to kill her cousin and her father. However, Paulina uses the amulet on the doll and throws it into a fireplace, which causes a fire and breaks Julio free, who helps one of the twins escape the house and narrowly escapes. Sometime later, the house is put up for sale, and while an interested family visit it, the family's eldest daughter finds the haunted doll intact, implying that what happened to Gaby and her family could be repeated.

== Cast ==
Character	Actor
Julio	Pedro Fernández
Fernando	Julio Alemán
Paulina	Gabriela Hassel
Lorena	Nuria Bages
Inquisidor	Carlos East
Callejear	Gianella Hassel Kus
Jaimito	Carlos East jr.
Pedrito	Ernesto East
Bruja	Andaluz Russel
Vendedor	José Manuel Fregoso
Comprador	René Cardona
Mujer 1	Regina de Seeman
Niña 1	Regina Seeman A.
Niña 2	Jumila Cardona
Doctor	Roberto Schlosser
Nicacio	Ernesto Casillas

== Reception ==
Vacaciones de terror received acclaim from the public for its plot and effects; it later became a cult film in Mexican cinema, mainly for being a pioneer in the genres of supernatural horror and possessions of inanimate objects. On the other hand, its premiere received a lukewarm reception from specialized critics, which has gradually changed: it is now considered a classic element of Mexican cinema.
