= The Curse of the Crying Woman =

- Original movie poster
- Directed by: Rafael Baledón
- Written by: Rafael Baledón; Fernando Galiana
- Produced by: Abel Salazar
- Starring: Rosa Arenas; Abel Salazar; Rita Macedo; Carlos López Moctezuma; Enrique Lucero
- Cinematography: José Ortiz Ramos
- Edited by: Ramón Aupart; Alfredo Rosas Priego
- Music by: Gustavo César Carrión
- Release date: August 1961
- Running time: 74 minutes
- Country: Mexico
- Language: Spanish

The Curse of the Crying Woman (Spanish: La maldición de la llorona) is a 1961 Mexican horror film (released in 1963), directed by Rafael Baledón. In the film, married couple Amelia and Jaime travel to an old country house owned by Amelia's aunt Selma, who practices black magic. Selma tries to use her niece in order to resurrect "la llorona" (the crying woman), an ancient specter.

== See also ==
- La Llorona
- List of ghost films
