= Trampa Infernal =

- Directed by: Pedro Galindo III
- Written by: Pedro Galindo III; Santiago Galindo
- Produced by: Eduardo Galindo; Santiago Galindo
- Starring: Pedro Fernández; Edith González; Toño Mauri; Charly Valentino; Marisol Santacruz; Adriana Vega; Alfredo Gutiérrez
- Cinematography: Antonio de Anda
- Edited by: Carlos Savage
- Music by: Pedro Plascencia
- Production companies: Galmex Films; Grupo Galindo
- Distributed by: Televicine
- Release date: October 1989 (Mexico)
- Running time: 77 minutes
- Country: Mexico
- Language: Spanish

Trampa Infernal (Hell's Trap) is a 1989 Mexican slasher film written and directed by Pedro Galindo III, and co-written by Santiago Galindo.

== Plot ==
A group of teenagers intend to hunt a bear and are stalked by a masked madman Vietnam veteran.

== Cast ==
- Pedro Fernández as Nacho
- Edith González as Alejandra
- Toño Mauri as Mauricio
- Charly Valentino as Charly
- Marisol Santacruz as Carlota Valencia
- Adriana Vega as Viviana
- Alfredo Gutiérrez as Mr. Jeremías
- Alberto Mejia Baron as Jesse
- Armando Galván as Javier

== Reception ==
Dread Central's Steve Barton had a positive response to the film, calling it "pure unadulterated grade-B entertainment" with deaths that "pack an interesting punch." Brett Gallman of Oh, the Horror! found that while the film was "not particularly great" it was still "a goofy bit of fun" with nice photography and "fairly decent bloodletting."
